= USA-42 =

American navigation satellite used for GPS

- Names: Navstar 2-03; GPS II-3; GPS SVN-16
- Mission type: Navigation
- Operator: U.S. Air Force
- COSPAR ID: 1989-064A
- SATCAT no.: 20185
- Mission duration: 7.5 years (planned); 11 years (achieved)

Spacecraft properties
- Spacecraft: GPS II
- Spacecraft type: GPS Block II
- Manufacturer: Rockwell International
- Launch mass: 840 kg (1,850 lb)
- Dimensions: 5.3 m (17 ft) of long
- Power: 710 watts

Start of mission
- Launch date: 18 August 1989, 05:57:59 UTC
- Rocket: Delta II 6925-9.5 (Delta D186)
- Launch site: Cape Canaveral, LC-17A
- Contractor: McDonnell Douglas
- Entered service: September 1989

End of mission
- Deactivated: 13 October 2000

Orbital parameters
- Reference system: Geocentric orbit
- Regime: Medium Earth orbit (Semi-synchronous)
- Slot: ?
- Perigee altitude: 20,113 km (12,498 mi)
- Apogee altitude: 20,246 km (12,580 mi)
- Inclination: 54.9°
- Period: 717.86 minutes

USA-42, also known as GPS II-3 and GPS SVN-16, was an American navigation satellite which formed part of the Global Positioning System. It was the third of nine Block II GPS satellites to be launched, which were the first operational GPS satellites to be placed into orbit.

== Background ==
It was part of the 21-satellite Global Positioning System (GPS) Block II series that provides precise position data (accurate to within 16 m) to military and civilian users worldwide. Its signals could be received on devices as small as a telephone. The GPS II satellites, built by Rockwell International for the Air Force Space Systems Division, each have a 7.5-year design life. The Air Force intends to launch a GPS II every 2 to 3 months until the constellation of 21 operational satellite and 3 spares is aloft. The GPS Block II join 7 operational Block 1 satellites.

== Launch ==
USA-42 was launched at 05:57:59 UTC on 18 August 1989, atop a Delta II launch vehicle, flight number D186, flying in the 6925 configuration. The launch took place from Launch Complex 17A (LC-17A) at the Cape Canaveral Air Force Station (CCAFS), and placed USA-42 into a transfer orbit. The satellite raised itself into medium Earth orbit using a Star-37XFP apogee motor.

== Mission ==
On 19 September 1989, USA-42 was in an orbit with a perigee of 20,113 km (12,498 mi), an apogee of 20,246 km (12,580 mi), a period of 717.86 minutes, and 54.9° of inclination to the equator. The satellite had a mass of 840 kg (1,850 lb), and generated 710 watts of power. It had a design life of 7.5 years, and ceased operations on 13 October 2000.
