= USA-168 =

American navigation satellite used for GPS

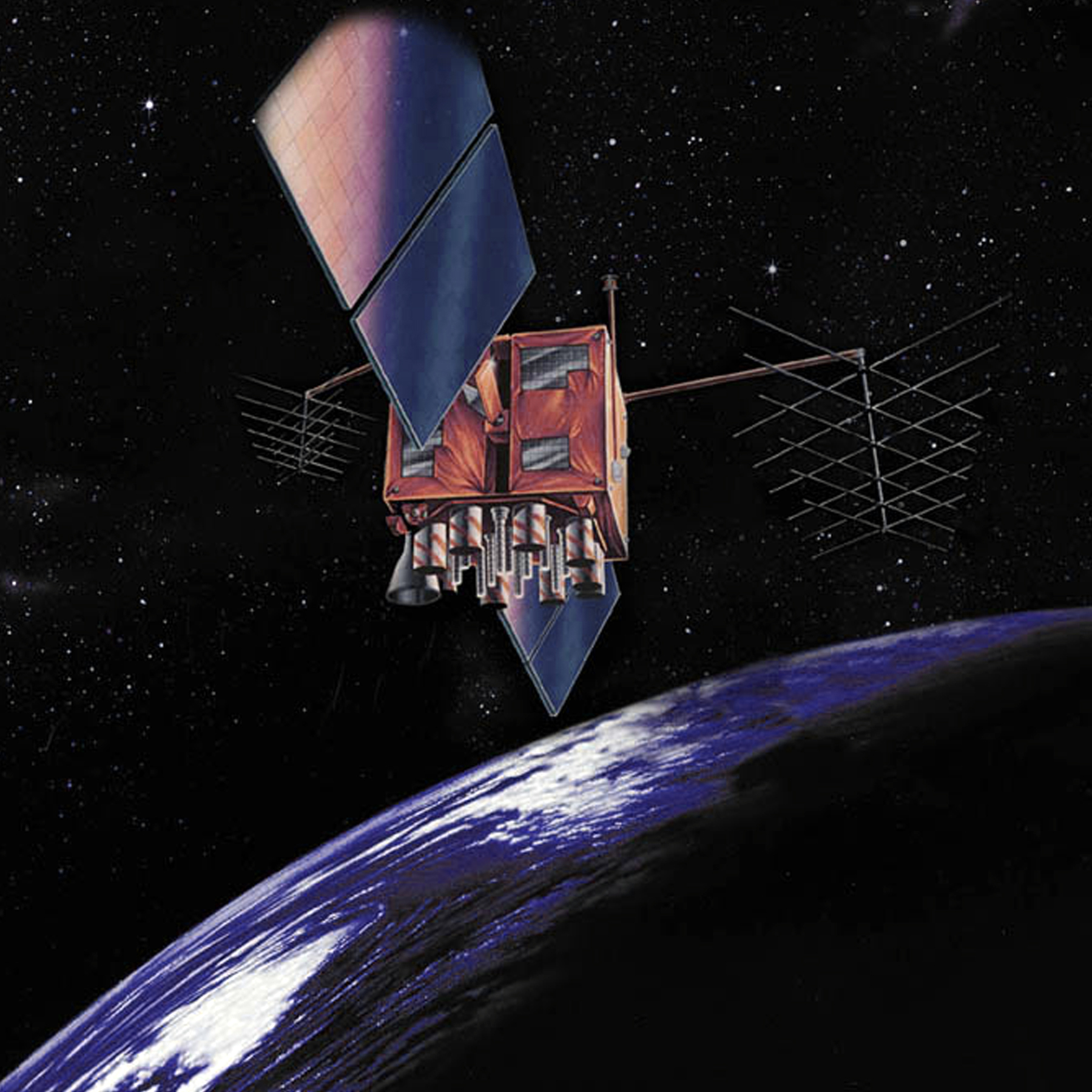
- A Block IIR GPS satellite
- Mission type: Navigation
- Operator: US Air Force
- COSPAR ID: 2003-010A
- SATCAT no.: 27704
- Mission duration: 10 years (planned)

Spacecraft properties
- Spacecraft type: GPS Block IIR
- Bus: AS-4000
- Manufacturer: Lockheed Martin
- Launch mass: 2,032 kilograms (4,480 lb)

Start of mission
- Launch date: 31 March 2003, 22:09:01 UTC
- Rocket: Delta II 7925-9.5, D297
- Launch site: Cape Canaveral SLC-17A

Orbital parameters
- Reference system: Geocentric
- Regime: Medium Earth (Semi-synchronous)
- Perigee altitude: 20,063 kilometres (12,467 mi)
- Apogee altitude: 20,433 kilometres (12,696 mi)
- Inclination: 54.9 degrees
- Period: 720.64 minutes

USA-168, also known as GPS IIR-9 and GPS SVN-45, is an American navigation satellite which forms part of the Global Positioning System. It was the ninth Block IIR GPS satellite to be launched, out of thirteen in the original configuration, and twenty one overall. It was built by Lockheed Martin, using the AS-4000 satellite bus.

USA-168 was launched at 22:09:01 UTC on 31 March 2003, atop a Delta II carrier rocket, flight number D297, flying in the 7925-9.5 configuration. The launch took place from Space Launch Complex 17A at the Cape Canaveral Air Force Station, and placed USA-168 into a transfer orbit. The satellite raised itself into medium Earth orbit using a Star-37FM apogee motor.

By 3 April 2003, USA-168 was in an orbit with a perigee of 20,063 kilometres (12,467 mi), an apogee of 20,433 kilometres (12,696 mi), a period of 720.64 minutes, and 54.9 degrees of inclination to the equator. It is used to broadcast the PRN 21 signal, and operates in slot 3 of plane D of the GPS constellation. The satellite has a mass of 2,032 kilograms (4,480 lb), and a design life of 10 years. USA-168 was decommissioned and removed from the GPS constellation on 27 January 2025.
