= USA-54 =

American navigation satellite used for GPS

- Names: Navstar 2-07; GPS II-7; GPS SVN-20
- Mission type: Navigation
- Operator: U.S. Air Force
- COSPAR ID: 1990-025A
- SATCAT no.: 20533
- Mission duration: 7.5 years (planned); 6.5 years (achieved)

Spacecraft properties
- Spacecraft: GPS II
- Spacecraft type: GPS Block II
- Manufacturer: Rockwell International
- Launch mass: 840 kg (1,850 lb)
- Dimensions: 5.3 m (17 ft) of long
- Power: 710 watts

Start of mission
- Launch date: 26 March 1990, 02:45:01 UTC
- Rocket: Delta II 6925-9.5 (Delta D193)
- Launch site: Cape Canaveral, LC-17A
- Contractor: McDonnell Douglas
- Entered service: April 1990

End of mission
- Deactivated: 21 May 1996

Orbital parameters
- Reference system: Geocentric orbit
- Regime: Medium Earth orbit (Semi-synchronous)
- Slot: ?
- Perigee altitude: 20,089 km (12,483 mi)
- Apogee altitude: 20,268 km (12,594 mi)
- Inclination: 55.0°
- Period: 717.84 minutes

USA-54, also known as GPS II-7 and GPS SVN-20, was an American navigation satellite which formed part of the Global Positioning System. It was the seventh of nine Block II GPS satellites to be launched, which were the first operational GPS satellites to fly.

== Background ==
Global Positioning System (GPS) was developed by the U.S. Department of Defense to provide all-weather round-the-clock navigation capabilities for military ground, sea, and air forces. Since its implementation, GPS has also become an integral asset in numerous civilian applications and industries around the globe, including recreational used (e.g., boating, aircraft, hiking), corporate vehicle fleet tracking, and surveying. GPS employs 24 spacecraft in 20,200 km circular orbits inclined at 55.0°. These vehicles are placed in 6 orbit planes with four operational satellites in each plane.

GPS Block 2 was the operational system, following the demonstration system composed of Block 1 (Navstar 1 - 11) spacecraft. These spacecraft were 3-axis stabilized, nadir pointing using reaction wheels. Dual solar arrays supplied 710 watts of power. They used S-band (SGLS) communications for control and telemetry and Ultra high frequency (UHF) cross-link between spacecraft. The payload consisted of two L-band navigation signals at 1575.42 MHz (L1) and 1227.60 MHz (L2). Each spacecraft carried 2 rubidium and 2 Cesium clocks and nuclear detonation detection sensors. Built by Rockwell Space Systems for the U.S. Air force, the spacecraft measured 5.3 m across with solar panels deployed and had a design life of 7.5 years.

== Launch ==
USA-54 was launched at 02:45:01 UTC on 26 March 1990, atop a Delta II launch vehicle, flight number D193, flying in the 6925-9.5 configuration. The launch took place from Launch Complex 17A (LC-17A) at the Cape Canaveral Air Force Station (CCAFS), and placed USA-54 into a transfer orbit. The satellite raised itself into medium Earth orbit using a Star-37XFP apogee motor.

== Mission ==
On 30 April 1990, USA-54 was in an orbit with a perigee of 20,089 km (12,483 mi), an apogee of 20,268 km (12,594 mi), a period of 717.84 minutes, and 55.0° of inclination to the equator. The satellite had a mass of 840 kg (1,850 lb), and generated 710 watts of power. It had a design life of 7.5 years, however following problems with the satellite switching between timing standards, the satellite was declared unusable on 21 May 1996.
