= USA-178 =

American navigation satellite used for GPS

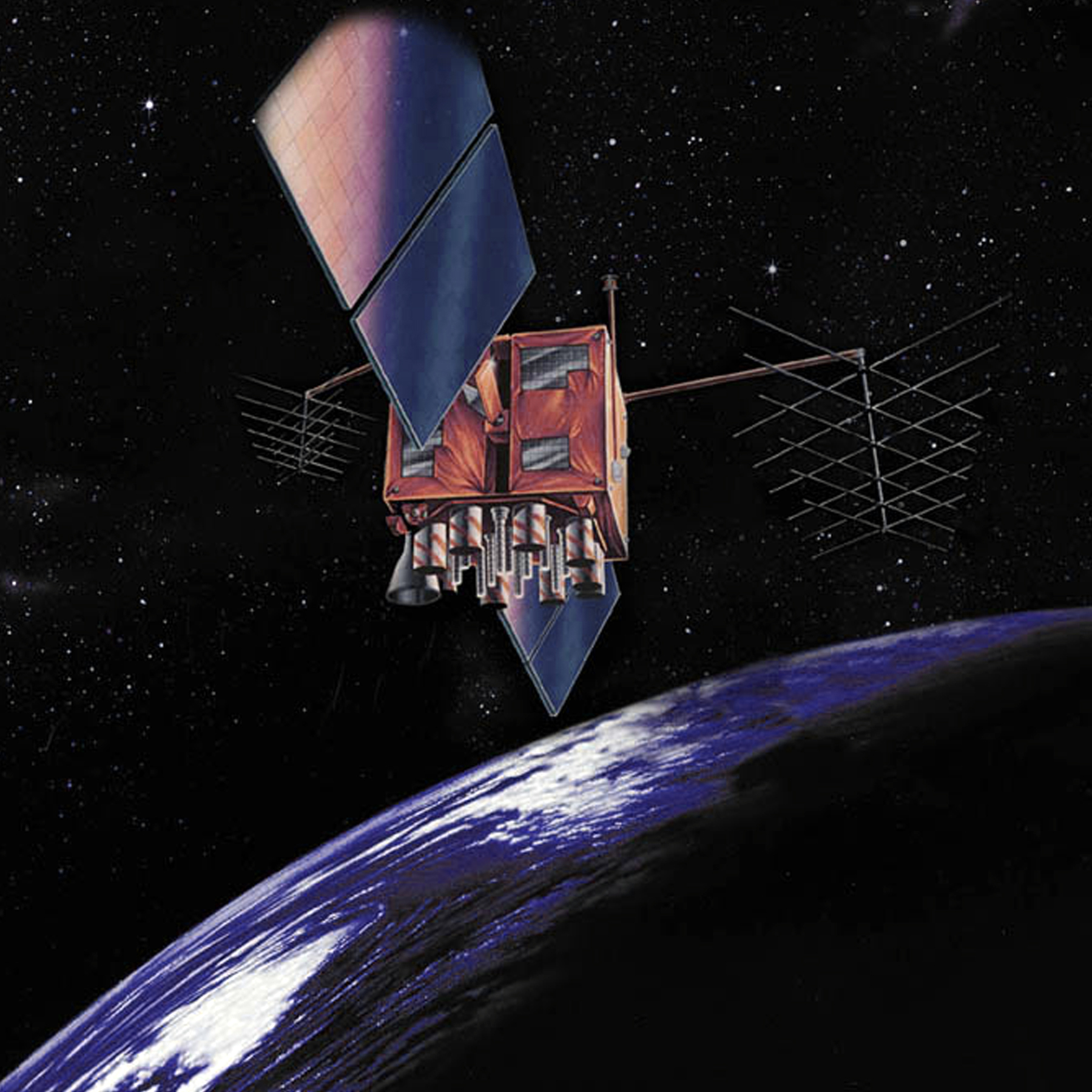
- A Block IIR GPS satellite
- Mission type: Navigation
- Operator: US Air Force
- COSPAR ID: 2004-023A
- SATCAT no.: 28361
- Mission duration: 10 years (planned); 15 years 8 months (achieved)

Spacecraft properties
- Spacecraft type: GPS Block IIR
- Bus: AS-4000
- Manufacturer: Lockheed Martin
- Launch mass: 2,032 kilograms (4,480 lb)

Start of mission
- Launch date: 23 June 2004, 22:54:00 UTC
- Rocket: Delta II 7925-9.5, D305
- Launch site: Cape Canaveral SLC-17B

End of mission
- Deactivated: 2 March 2020

Orbital parameters
- Reference system: Geocentric
- Regime: Medium Earth (Semi-synchronous)
- Perigee altitude: 20,089 kilometres (12,483 mi)
- Apogee altitude: 20,277 kilometres (12,600 mi)
- Inclination: 55 degrees
- Period: 718 minutes

USA-178, also known as GPS IIR-12 and GPS SVN-60, is an American navigation satellite which forms part of the Global Positioning System. It was the twelfth Block IIR GPS satellite to be launched, out of thirteen in the original configuration, and twenty one overall. It was built by Lockheed Martin, using the AS-4000 satellite bus.

USA-178 was launched at 22:54:00 UTC on 23 June 2004, atop a Delta II carrier rocket, flight number D305, flying in the 7925–9.5 configuration. The launch took place from Space Launch Complex 17B at the Cape Canaveral Air Force Station, and placed USA-178 into a transfer orbit. The satellite raised itself into medium Earth orbit using a Star-37FM apogee motor.

By 23 August 2004, USA-178 was in an orbit with a perigee of 20,089 kilometres (12,483 mi), an apogee of 20,277 kilometres (12,600 mi), a period of 718 minutes, and 55 degrees of inclination to the equator. It is used to broadcast the PRN 23 signal, and operates in slot 4 of plane F of the GPS constellation. The satellite has a mass of 2,032 kilograms (4,480 lb), and a design life of 10 years. As of March 2020 it is no longer in service.
