= USA-85 =

American navigation satellite used for GPS

- Names: Navstar 2A-07; GPS IIA-7; GPS II-16; GPS SVN-32
- Mission type: Navigation
- Operator: U.S. Air Force
- COSPAR ID: 1992-079A
- SATCAT no.: 22231
- Mission duration: 7.5 years (planned); 15.25 years (achieved)

Spacecraft properties
- Spacecraft: GPS IIA
- Spacecraft type: GPS Block IIA
- Manufacturer: Rockwell International
- Launch mass: 840 kg (1,850 lb)
- Dimensions: 5.3 m (17 ft) of long
- Power: 710 watts

Start of mission
- Launch date: 22 November 1992, 23:54:00 UTC
- Rocket: Delta II 7925-9.5 (Delta D216)
- Launch site: Cape Canaveral, LC-17A
- Contractor: McDonnell Douglas
- Entered service: 23 December 1992

End of mission
- Disposal: Graveyard orbit
- Deactivated: 17 March 2008

Orbital parameters
- Reference system: Geocentric orbit
- Regime: Medium Earth orbit (Semi-synchronous)
- Slot: F4 (slot 4 plane F)
- Perigee altitude: 20,074 km (12,473 mi)
- Apogee altitude: 20,251 km (12,583 mi)
- Inclination: 54.8°
- Period: 717.96 minutes

USA-85, also known as GPS IIA-7, GPS II-16 and GPS SVN-32, was an American navigation satellite which formed part of the Global Positioning System. It was the seventh of nineteen Block IIA GPS satellites to be launched.

== Background ==
Global Positioning System (GPS) was developed by the U.S. Department of Defense to provide all-weather round-the-clock navigation capabilities for military ground, sea, and air forces. Since its implementation, GPS has also become an integral asset in numerous civilian applications and industries around the globe, including recreational use (e.g., boating, aircraft, hiking), corporate vehicle fleet tracking, and surveying. GPS employs 24 spacecraft in 20,200 km circular orbits inclined at 55.0°. These vehicles are placed in 6 orbit planes with four operational satellites in each plane.

GPS Block 2 was the operational system, following the demonstration system composed of Block 1 (Navstar 1 - 11) spacecraft. These spacecraft were 3-axis stabilized, nadir pointing using reaction wheels. Dual solar arrays supplied 710 watts of power. They used S-band (SGLS) communications for control and telemetry and Ultra high frequency (UHF) cross-link between spacecraft. The payload consisted of two L-band navigation signals at 1575.42 MHz (L1) and 1227.60 MHz (L2). Each spacecraft carried 2 rubidium and 2 Cesium clocks and nuclear detonation detection sensors. Built by Rockwell Space Systems for the U.S. Air force, the spacecraft measured 5.3 m across with solar panels deployed and had a design life of 7.5 years.

== Launch ==
USA-85 was launched at 23:54:00 UTC on 22 November 1992, atop a Delta II launch vehicle, flight number D216, flying in the 7925-9.5 configuration. The launch took place from Launch Complex 17A (LC-17A) at the Cape Canaveral Air Force Station (CCAFS), and placed USA-85 into a transfer orbit. The satellite raised itself into medium Earth orbit using a Star-37XFP apogee motor.

== Mission ==
On 23 December 1992, USA-85 was in an orbit with a perigee of 20,074 km (12,473 mi), an apogee of 20,251 km (12,583 mi), a period of 717.96 minutes, and 54.8° of inclination to the equator. It was intended to broadcast signal PRN 32, but this was changed to PRN 01 on 28 January 1993 after it was discovered that receivers could not track the PRN 32 signal. The spacecraft was operated in slot 4 of plane F of the GPS constellation, and had a mass of 840 kg (1,850 lb). It had a design life of 7.5 years, and was retired from service on 17 March 2008. It is unclear whether it has been retained as a backup satellite.
