= USA-175 =

American navigation satellite used for GPS

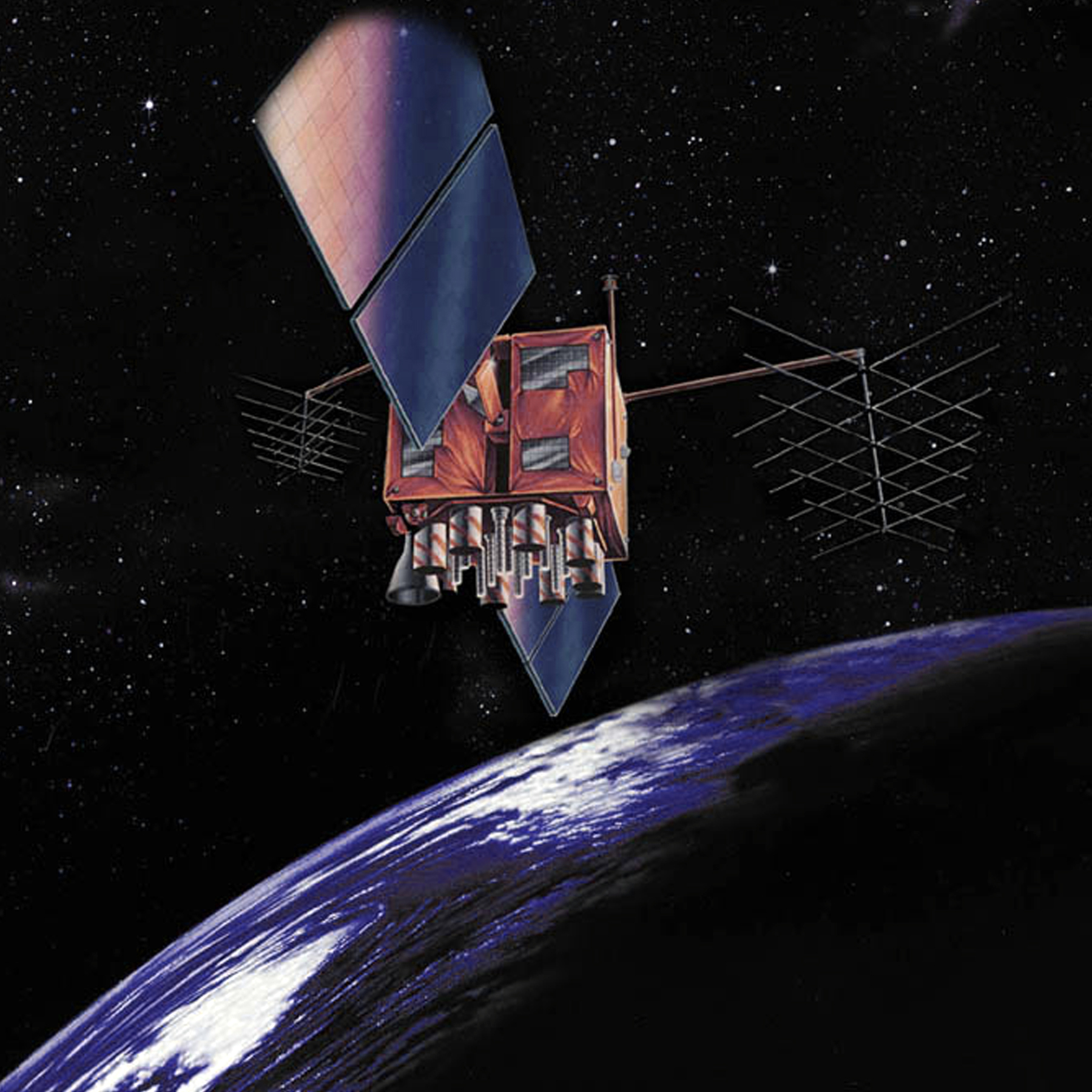
- A Block IIR GPS satellite
- Mission type: Navigation
- Operator: US Air Force
- COSPAR ID: 2003-058A
- SATCAT no.: 28129
- Mission duration: 10 years (planned); 18 years (achieved)

Spacecraft properties
- Spacecraft type: GPS Block IIR
- Bus: AS-4000
- Manufacturer: Lockheed Martin
- Launch mass: 2,032 kilograms (4,480 lb)

Start of mission
- Launch date: 21 December 2003, 08:05:00 UTC
- Rocket: Delta II 7925-9.5, D302
- Launch site: Cape Canaveral SLC-17A

End of mission
- Deactivated: 18 January 2022

Orbital parameters
- Reference system: Geocentric
- Regime: Medium Earth (Semi-synchronous)
- Perigee altitude: 20,043 kilometres (12,454 mi)
- Apogee altitude: 20,319 kilometres (12,626 mi)
- Inclination: 55.1 degrees
- Period: 717.92 minutes

USA-175, also known as GPS IIR-10 and GPS SVN-47, is an American navigation satellite which forms part of the Global Positioning System. It was the tenth Block IIR GPS satellite to be launched, out of thirteen in the original configuration, and twenty one overall. It was built by Lockheed Martin, using the AS-4000 satellite bus.

USA-175 was launched at 08:05:00 UTC on 21 December 2003, atop a Delta II carrier rocket, flight number D302, flying in the 7925-9.5 configuration. The launch took place from Space Launch Complex 17A at the Cape Canaveral Air Force Station, and placed USA-175 into a transfer orbit. The satellite raised itself into medium Earth orbit using a Star-48 apogee motor.

By 22 February 2004, USA-175 was in an orbit with a perigee of 20,043 kilometres (12,454 mi), an apogee of 20,319 kilometres (12,626 mi), a period of 717.92 minutes, and 55.1 degrees of inclination to the equator. It is used to broadcast the PRN 22 signal, and operates in slot 2 of plane E of the GPS constellation. The satellite has a mass of 2,032 kilograms (4,480 lb), and a design life of 10 years. It was decommissioned in January 2022, per the USCG Nanu 2022001.
