= Cape Canaveral Space Launch Complex 17 =

American space launch site at Cape Canaveral Air Force Station in Florida, United States

Space Launch Complex 17
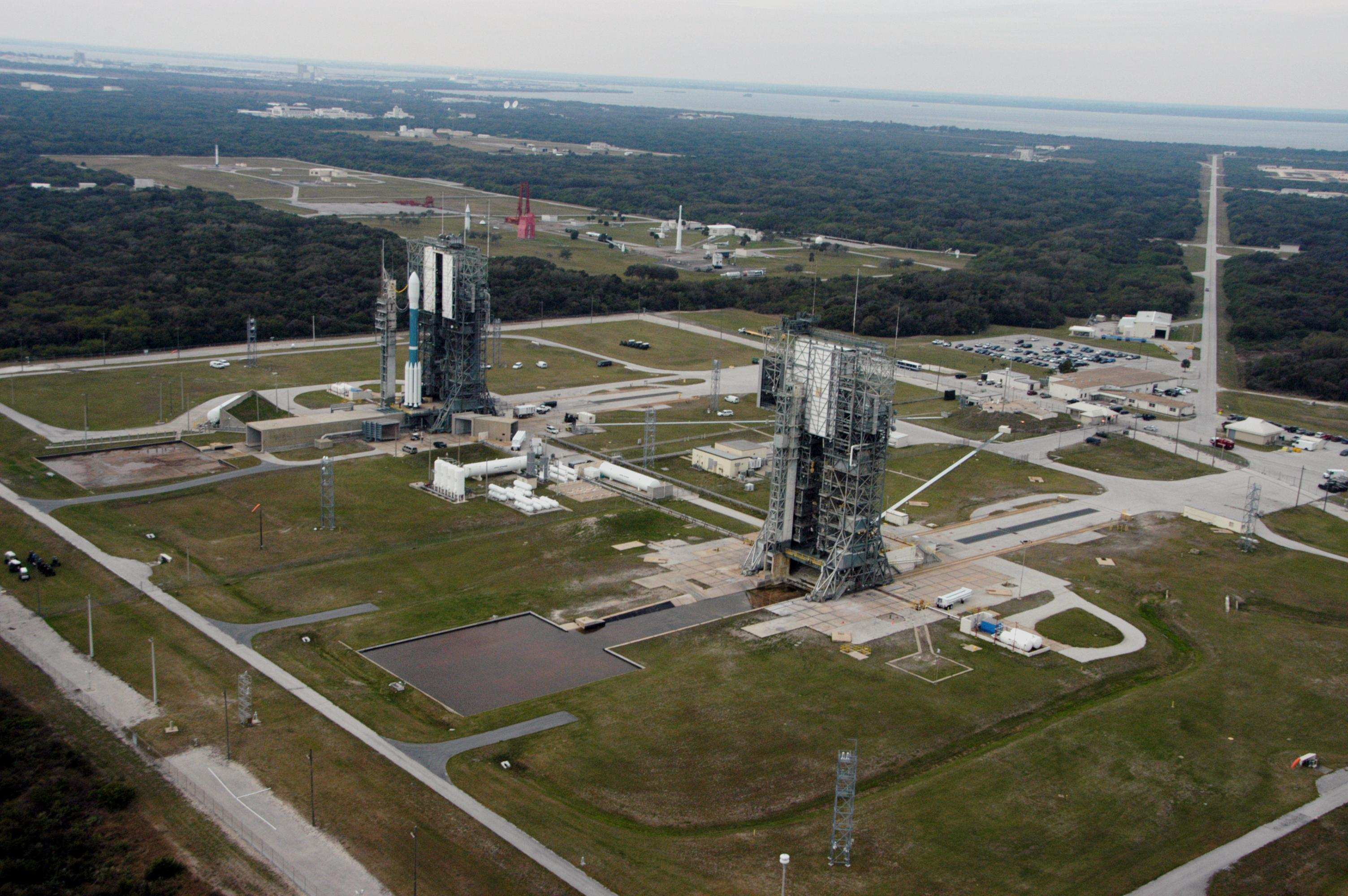
- SLC-17 in February 2007. On Pad 17B is a Delta II carrying THEMIS as its payload. In the background is the Cape Canaveral Space Force Museum.
- Interactive map of Space Launch Complex 17
- Launch site: Cape Canaveral Space Force Station
- Location: 28°26′48″N 80°33′58″W
- Time zone: UTC−05:00 (EST)
  - Summer (DST): UTC−04:00 (EDT)
- Short name: SLC-17
- Operator: United States Space Force; NASA
- Total launches: 321
- Launch pad: Two
- Orbital inclination range: 28°-57°
SLC-17A launch history
- Status: Demolished
- Launches: 159
- First launch: 30 August 1957; PGM-17 Thor
- Last launch: 17 August 2009; Delta II / GPS IIR-M8
- Associated rockets: Retired: PGM-17 Thor, Thor-Able, Thor-Ablestar, Thor-Delta, Thor DSV-2, Delta I, Delta II
SLC-17B launch history
- Status: Demolished
- Launches: 162
- First launch: 25 January 1957; PGM-17 Thor
- Last launch: 10 September 2011; Delta II / GRAIL
- Associated rockets: Retired: PGM-17 Thor, Thor-Ablestar, Thor DSV-2, Delta I, Delta II, Delta III

Launch sites at Cape Canaveral Space Force Station and Kennedy Space Center
Active pads
Inactive leased pads
Inactive unleased pads
Repurposed pads, not used for launches
1 LC-39B
2 LC-39A
3 LC-48
4 SLC-41
5 SLC-40
6 LC-47
7 SLC-37
8 LC-34
9 SLC-20
10 LC-19
11 LC-16
12 LC-15
13 LC-14
14 LC-13 (LZ-2)
15 LC-12
16 LC-11
17 LC-36
18 LC-1, LC-2, LC-3, and LC-4
19 SLC-46
20 LC-21 and LC-22
21 LC-31 and LC-32
22 LC-18
23 SLC-17
24 LC-26
25 LC-5 and LC-6
26 LC-30
27 LC-25
28 LC-29

Space Launch Complex 17 (SLC-17), previously designated Launch Complex 17 (LC-17), was a launch site at Cape Canaveral Space Force Station, Florida, used for Thor and Delta launch vehicles launches between 1958 and 2011.

Originally built in 1956, SLC-17 features two expendable launch vehicle (ELV) launch pads, SLC-17A and SLC-17B. The pads were operated by the 45th Space Wing and have supported more than 300 Department of Defense, NASA and commercial missile and rocket launches.

== History ==
SLC-17 was built in 1956 by the United States Air Force for use with the PGM-17 Thor missile, the first operational ballistic missile in the arsenal of the United States. It was initially designed for testing suborbital launches of the Thor, in accordance to the IRBM's planned stationing in the United Kingdom as part of Project Emily. Pad 17A supported its first Thor missile launch on 3 August 1957, and Pad 17B supported its first Thor launch on 25 January 1957. As the Thor got wound down from missile use due to the advent of longer-range ICBMs, the site was upgraded in the early 1960s to support a variety of space-oriented launch vehicles derived from the basic Thor booster. Initially starting with the Thor-Able in 1958, these Thor-based rockets came to be called the Delta family of launch vehicles.

Thirty-five early Delta rocket missions were launched from Complex 17 between the beginning of 1960 and the end of 1965. The Air Force transferred Launch Complex 17A to NASA in 1965, but the site was returned to the military in 1988 to support McDonnell Douglas's Delta II program.

As Delta II launches continued over the next decades, Pad 17B was modified in 1997 to support a new, more powerful launch vehicle, the Delta III, which made its maiden flight from the complex on 26 August 1998. The launch ended in failure, as did a second launch the next year. After a third launch on 23 August 2000 placed a mass simulator into a lower than planned orbit, the program was abandoned.

Among the major NASA missions launched from the complex were the Explorer and Pioneer space probes, all of the Orbiting Solar Observatories, the Solar Maximum Mission, biological satellites (Biosatellite program), the International Cometary Explorer (ICE), the TIROS and GOES meteorology satellites, and the Mars Exploration Rovers Spirit and Opportunity.

Following the last military launch, in August 2009, SLC-17A was withdrawn from use, and LC-17B was transferred to NASA for two remaining launches. On 10 September 2011, a Delta II 7920H-10C made the final launch from SLC-17B, carrying NASA's GRAIL spacecraft. All remaining Delta II launches were made from SLC-2W at Vandenberg Air Force Base in California until its ultimate retirement in 2018.

At 11:00 UTC (7:00 a.m. EDT) on 12 July 2018, both launch towers had been demolished via controlled demolition to make way for Moon Express to build and test its lunar lander.

As of August 2024, the United States Space Force (having taken over the Air Force's jurisdiction) plans to fully demolish SLC-17 and the neighboring LC-18 in favor of extending Lighthouse Road and reconnecting its two separate sections back together.

== Launch statistics ==
=== SLC-17A ===
- Thor
- Thor-Able
- Thor-Ablestar
- Delta I
- Delta II

==== Thor and early Delta ====
Thor, Thor-Able, and Thor-Ablestar launches operated by the United States Air Force. Thor-Delta launches operated by NASA.

No.	Date	Time (UTC)	Launch vehicle	Configuration	Payload	Result	Remarks
1	30 August 1957	Unknown	PGM-17 Thor	Thor DM-18	Suborbital test	Failure	First launch from LC-17A. Control malfunction ultimately led to vehicle breakup 92 seconds after launch.
2	3 October 1957	17:14	PGM-17 Thor	Thor DM-18	Suborbital test	Failure	Gas generator failed to start because of stuck valve, leading to rocket falling back onto pad and exploding.
3	24 October 1957	16:32	PGM-17 Thor	Thor DM-18	Suborbital test	Success	First successful flight from LC-17A.
4	19 December 1957	20:12	PGM-17 Thor	Thor DM-18	Suborbital test	Success	
5	28 January 1958	20:16	PGM-17 Thor	Thor DM-18	Suborbital test	Failure	Electrical malfunction resulted in control failure, leading to range safety protocols being activated 152 seconds after launch.
6	24 April 1958	00:10	Thor-Able	Thor DM-18 / Able	Suborbital test	Failure	Maiden flight of the Thor-Able. Turbopump failure occurred 146 seconds after launch, leading to vehicle breakup.
7	10 July 1958	15:06	Thor-Able	Thor DM-18 / Able	Suborbital test	Success	
8	23 July 1958	22:13	Thor-Able	Thor DM-18 / Able	Suborbital test	Success	Nose cone contained a mouse as a biological experiment. Reentry vehicle was not recovered.
9	17 August 1958	12:18	Thor-Able	Thor DM-18 / Able-I	Pioneer 0	Failure	First mission of the Pioneer program, aiming to study the Moon from orbit. First orbital launch of a Thor rocket and first American attempt to send a spacecraft to another celestial body. Turbopump failure occurred 73 seconds after launch, leading to vehicle breakup.
10	11 October 1958	08:42	Thor-Able	Thor DM-18 / Able-I	Pioneer 1	Partial failure	Part of the Pioneer program, aiming to study the Moon from orbit. First ever payload operated by NASA. Third stage underperformed, leading to satellite being placed on very steep suborbital trajectory. Set distance record for an artificial object by time of launch.
11	8 November 1958	08:42	Thor-Able	Thor DM-18 / Able-I	Pioneer 2	Failure	Part of the Pioneer program, aiming to study the Moon from orbit. Third stage failed to ignite, placing payload on suborbital trajectory.
12	23 January 1959	Unknown	Thor-Able	Thor DM-18 / Able-II	Suborbital test	Failure	Electrical malfunction caused staging failure.
13	28 February 1959	07:58	Thor-Able	Thor DM-18 / Able-II	Suborbital test	Success	
14	21 March 1959	06:19	Thor-Able	Thor DM-18 / Able-II	Suborbital test	Success	
15	8 April 1959	06:35	Thor-Able	Thor DM-18 / Able-II	Suborbital test	Success	
16	21 May 1959	06:40	Thor-Able	Thor DM-18 / Able-II	Suborbital test	Success	
17	11 June 1959	06:44	Thor-Able	Thor DM-18 / Able-II	Suborbital test	Success	
18	7 August 1959	14:24	Thor-Able	Thor DM-18 / Able-III	Explorer 6	Success	Part of the Explorer program, aiming to study trapped radiation from space. First successful orbital launch from LC-17A. Captured first images of Earth from orbit.
19	17 September 1959	14:34	Thor-Able	Thor DM-18 / Able-II	Transit 1A	Failure	First launch of the Transit Satellite System.. Third stage malfunction, failing to place payload in orbit.
20	11 March 1960	13:00	Thor-Able	Thor DM-18 / Able-IV	Pioneer 5	Success	Part of the Pioneer program, aiming to study interplanetary space. Initially planned to perform a flyby of Venus, but development issues forced a delay and missing of transfer window.
21	1 April 1960	11:40	Thor-Able	Thor DM-18 / Able-II	TIROS-1	Success	Part of the TIROS series of weather satellites. First ever weather satellite, and final launch of the Thor-Able.
22	13 May 1960	09:16	Thor-Delta	Thor DM-19 / Delta	Echo 1	Failure	Part of Project Echo, aimed at experimenting with passive communication. Maiden flight of the Thor-Delta. Upper stage altitude control malfunction resulted in loss of mission.
23	12 August 1960	09:39	Thor-Delta	Thor DM-19 / Delta	Echo 1A	Success	Part of Project Echo, aimed at experimenting with passive communication. Reflight of Echo 1. Hardware built as part of the mission include the Holmdel Horn Antenna, which later was used to discover the cosmic microwave background.
24	23 November 1960	11:13	Thor-Delta	Thor DM-19 / Delta	TIROS-2	Success	Part of the TIROS series of weather satellites.
25	23 March 1961	15:17	Thor-Delta	Thor DM-19 / Delta	Explorer 10	Success	Part of the Explorer program, aiming to study earth's magnetosphere and plasma.
26	12 July 1961	10:25	Thor-Delta	Thor DM-19 / Delta	TIROS-3	Success	Part of the TIROS series of weather satellites.
27	16 August 1961	03:21	Thor-Delta	Thor DM-19 / Delta	Explorer 12	Success	Part of the Explorer program, aiming to study earth's magnetosphere and the solar wind.
28	15 January 1962	11:07	Thor DSV-2	Thor DSV-2D	Suborbital test	Success	
29	8 February 1962	12:43	Thor-Delta	Thor DM-19 / Delta	TIROS-4	Success	Part of the TIROS series of weather satellites.
30	7 March 1962	16:06	Thor-Delta	Thor DM-19 / Delta	OSO-1	Success	Part of the Orbiting Solar Observatory series of heliophysics satellites.
31	26 April 1962	18:00	Thor-Delta	Thor DM-19 / Delta	Ariel 1	Success	Satellite aimed at studying Earth's ionosphere. First British satellite, making them the third nation to have a spacecraft in orbit, after the Soviet Union and the United States.
32	19 June 1962	12:19	Thor-Delta	Thor DM-19 / Delta	TIROS-5	Success	Part of the TIROS series of weather satellites.
33	19 July 1962	09:30	Thor DSV-2	Thor DSV-2D	Suborbital test	Success	
34	18 September 1962	08:53	Thor-Delta	Thor DM-19 / Delta	TIROS-6	Success	Part of the TIROS series of weather satellites. Final flight of the baseline Thor-Delta.
35	31 October 1962	08:08	Thor-Ablestar	Thor DM-21 / Ablestar	ANNA 1B	Success	Only flight of the Thor-Ablestar from LC-17A.
36	13 December 1962	23:30	Delta B	Thor DM-21 / Delta-B	Relay 1	Success	
37	3 April 1963	02:00	Delta B	Thor DM-21 / Delta-B	Explorer 17	Success	Part of the Explorer program, aiming to study earth's upper atmosphere.
38	26 July 1963	14:33	Delta B	Thor DM-21 / Delta-B	Syncom 2	Success	Part of the Syncom series of experimental communication satellites. First satellite to be placed in geosynchronous orbit.
39	19 March 1964	11:13	Delta B	Thor DM-21 / Delta-B	Explorer S-66	Failure	Part of the Explorer program, aiming to study Earth's ionosphere. Underperforming of third stage caused failure to reach orbit.
40	19 August 1964	12:15	Delta D	Thor DSV-2A / Delta-D / Altair-2	Syncom 3	Success	Part of the Syncom series of experimental communication satellites. First satellite to be placed in geostationary orbit.
41	4 October 1964	03:45	Delta C	Thor DSV-2A / Delta-D / Altair-2	Explorer 21	Partial failure	Part of the Explorer program, aiming to study cosmic rays and other electromagnetic activity. Payload deployed in lower than expected orbit.
42	21 December 1964	09:00	Delta C	Thor DSV-2A / Delta-D / Altair-2	Explorer 26	Success	Part of the Explorer program, aiming to study earth's magnetosphere.
43	22 January 1965	07:55	Delta C	Thor DSV-2A / Delta-D / Altair-2	TIROS-9	Success	Part of the TIROS series of weather satellites.
44	6 April 1965	23:45	Delta D	Thor DSV-2A / Delta-D / Altair-2	Intelsat I	Success	Commercial communications satellite, also known as "Early Bird". Performed first transoceanic television broadcast. First commercial launch from LC-17.
45	6 November 1965	18:43	Delta E	Thor DSV-2C / Delta-E / Altair-2	Explorer 29	Success	Part of the Explorer program, aiming to study geodesy from orbit.
46	16 December 1965	07:31	Delta E	Thor DSV-2C / Delta-E / Altair-2	Pioneer 6	Success	Part of the Pioneer program, aiming to study interplanetary space from great distance to Earth. Launched as Pioneer A. First of five heliocentric orbit-centered Pioneer satellites. First Delta launch going beyond geostationary orbit.
47	3 February 1966	07:41	Delta C	Thor DSV-2A / Delta-D / Altair-2	ESSA-1	Success	Part of the TOS series of weather satellites for the ESSA.
48	1 July 1966	16:04	Delta E1	Thor DSV-2C / Delta-E / FW-4D	Explorer 33	Success	Part of the Explorer program, aiming to study earth's magnetosphere.
49	17 August 1966	15:20	Delta E1	Thor DSV-2C / Delta-E / FW-4D	Pioneer 7	Success	Part of the Pioneer program, aiming to study interplanetary space from great distance to Earth. Launched as Pioneer B. Second of five heliocentric orbit-centered Pioneer satellites.
50	14 December 1966	19:26	Delta G	Thor DSV-2C / Delta-E	Biosatellite 1	Success	First of three launches of the Biosatellite program, studying how various lifeforms operate in space.
51	8 March 1967	16:19	Delta C	Thor DSV-2A / Delta-D / Altair-2	OSO-3	Success	Part of the Orbiting Solar Observatory series of heliophysics satellites.
52	19 September 1968	00:09	Delta M	Thor LTT / Delta-E / Star 37D	Intelsat 3-1	Failure	Gyroscope failure lead to loss of control 20 seconds after launch, shortly after activating RSO protocols 110 seconds after launch.
53	19 December 1968	00:32	Delta M	Thor LTT / Delta-E / Star 37D	Intelsat 3-2	Success	
54	6 February 1969	00:39	Delta M	Thor LTT / Delta-E / Star 37D	Intelsat 3-3	Success	
55	22 May 1969	02:00	Delta M	Thor LTT / Delta-E / Star 37D	Intelsat 3-4	Success	
56	29 June 1969	13:26	Delta N	Thor LTT / Delta-E	Biosatellite 3	Success	Third of three launches of the Biosatellite program, studying how various lifeforms operate in space.
57	26 July 1969	02:06	Delta M	Thor LTT / Delta-E / Star 37D	Intelsat 3-5	Partial failure	Third stage ruptured, leaving payload in unusable orbit.
58	27 August 1969	21:59	Delta L	Thor LTT / Delta-E / FW-1D	Pioneer E	Failure	Part of the Pioneer program, aiming to study interplanetary space from great distance to Earth. Fifth of five heliocentric orbit-centered Pioneer satellites. Hydraulic fluid leak led to loss of gimbaling in first stage, preventing second stage from reaching orbit. RSO protocols activated 480 seconds after launch.
59	22 November 1969	00:37	Delta M	Thor LTT / Delta-E / Star 37D	Skynet 1A	Success	
60	15 January 1970	00:16	Delta M	Thor LTT / Delta-E / Star 37D	Intelsat 3-6	Success	
61	23 March 1970	23:46	Delta M	Thor LTT / Delta-E / Star 37D	NATO 1	Success	
62	23 April 1970	00:46	Delta M	Thor LTT / Delta-E / Star 37D	Intelsat 3-7	Success	
63	23 July 1970	23:23	Delta M	Thor LTT / Delta-E / Star 37D	Intelsat 3-8	Success	
64	19 August 1970	12:11	Delta M	Thor LTT / Delta-E / Star 37D	Skynet 1B	Success	
65	3 February 1971	01:41	Delta M	Thor LTT / Delta-E / Star 37D	NATO 2	Success	
66	13 March 1971	16:15	Delta M6	Thor LTT / Delta-E / Star 37D	Explorer 43	Success	Part of the Explorer program, aiming to study earth's magnetosphere.
67	29 September 1971	09:50	Delta N	Thor LTT / Delta-E	OSO-7	Success	Part of the Orbiting Solar Observatory series of heliophysics satellites. Second stage encountered altitude control system failure, but satellite reached orbit and flight path was corrected. Final Delta launch from LC-17 using lettered designations.

==== Later Delta I ====
All launches operated by NASA.

No.	Date	Time (UTC)	Launch vehicle	Configuration	Payload	Result	Remarks
68	27 August 1975	01:42	Delta 2000	Thor-Delta 2914	Symphonie-2	Success	First Delta launch from LC-17A using a numerical designation.
69	13 December 1975	01:56	Delta 3000	Thor-Delta 3914	Satcom-1	Success	
70	26 March 1976	22:42	Delta 3000	Thor-Delta 3914	Satcom-2	Success	
71	10 June 1976	00:09	Delta 2000	Thor-Delta 2914	Marisat-2	Success	
72	8 July 1976	23:31	Delta 2000	Thor-Delta 2914	Palapa-A1	Success	
73	14 October 1976	22:44	Delta 2000	Thor-Delta 2914	Marisat-3	Success	
74	10 March 1977	23:16	Delta 2000	Thor-Delta 2914	NATO 3B	Success	
75	13 September 1977	23:21	Delta 3000	Thor-Delta 3914	OTS-1	Failure	Rupture in casing of a solid rocket booster lead to loss of launch vehicle 52 seconds after launch.
76	23 November 1977	01:35	Delta 2000	Thor-Delta 2914	Meteosat-1	Success	
77	26 January 1978	17:36	Delta 2000	Thor-Delta 2914	International Ultraviolet Explorer	Success	Part of the Explorer program, a space telescope designed to conduct ultraviolet astronomy. Collaboration between NASA, ESA, and SERC.
78	11 May 1978	22:59	Delta 3000	Thor-Delta 3914	OTS-2	Success	
79	14 July 1978	10:43	Delta 2000	Thor-Delta 2914	ESA-GEOS-2	Success	
80	16 December 1978	00:21	Delta 3000	Thor-Delta 3914	Anik-B1	Success	
81	10 August 1979	00:20	Delta 2000	Thor-Delta 2914	Westar-3	Success	
82	7 December 1979	01:35	Delta 3000	Thor-Delta 3914	Satcom-3	Success	
83	14 February 1980	15:57	Delta 3000	Thor-Delta 3910	Solar Maximum Mission	Success	Heliophysics satellite designed to investigate solar phenomena such as solar flares. Was later visited by Space Shuttle Challenger during STS-41-C in order to have its altitude control system repaired.
84	9 September 1980	22:27	Delta 3000	Thor-Delta 3914	GOES-4	Success	Launched as GOES-D. Part of the Geostationary Operational Environmental Satellites system of satellites.
85	15 November 1980	22:49	Delta 3000	Thor-Delta 3910	SBS-1	Success	
86	22 May 1981	22:29	Delta 3000	Thor-Delta 3914	GOES-5	Success	Launched as GOES-E. Part of the Geostationary Operational Environmental Satellites system of satellites.
87	24 September 1981	23:09	Delta 3000	Thor-Delta 3910	SBS-2	Success	
88	20 November 1981	01:37	Delta 3000	Thor-Delta 3910	Satcom 3R	Success	
89	16 January 1982	01:54	Delta 3000	Thor-Delta 3910	Satcom 4	Success	
90	26 February 1982	00:04	Delta 3000	Thor-Delta 3910	Westar 4	Success	
91	10 April 1982	06:47	Delta 3000	Thor-Delta 3910	Insat 1A	Success	
92	9 June 1982	00:24	Delta 3000	Thor-Delta 3910	Westar 5	Success	
93	28 April 1983	22:26	Delta 3000	Thor-Delta 3914	GOES-6	Success	Launched as GOES-F. Part of the Geostationary Operational Environmental Satellites system of satellites.
94	28 July 1983	22:49	Delta 3000	Thor-Delta 3920	Telstar-3A	Success	
95	22 September 1983	22:16	Delta 3000	Thor-Delta 3920	Galaxy 2	Success	
96	16 August 1984	14:30	Delta 3000	Thor-Delta 3924	AMPTE-CCE	Success	Part of the Explorer program, aiming to study earth's magnetosphere.
97	14 November 1984	00:34	Delta 3000	Thor-Delta 3914	NATO 3D	Success	
98	3 May 1986	22:18	Delta 3000	Thor-Delta 3914	GOES-G	Failure	Part of the Geostationary Operational Environmental Satellites system of satellites. First stage electric failure lead to loss of control and destruction of rocket 90 seconds after launch.
99	26 February 1987	23:05	Delta 3000	Thor-Delta 3914	GOES-7	Success	Launched as GOES-H. Part of the Geostationary Operational Environmental Satellites system of satellites. Final Delta I launch from LC-17A.

==== Delta II ====
Launches before August 1997 operated by McDonnell Douglas. Launches between then and 2007 operated by Boeing. Launches since 2007 operated by United Launch Alliance.

No.	Date	Time (UTC)	Launch vehicle	Configuration	Payload	Result	Remarks
100	14 February 1989	18:30	Delta II	Thor-Delta 6925	USA-35 (GPS II-1)	Success	Part of the Global Positioning System. Maiden flight of the Delta II. First GPS Block II launch. First GPS launch from a Delta rocket and first GPS launch from Cape Canaveral.
101	10 June 1989	22:30	Delta II	Thor-Delta 6925	USA-38 (GPS II-2)	Success	Part of the Global Positioning System.
102	18 August 1989	05:58	Delta II	Thor-Delta 6925	USA-42 (GPS II-3)	Success	Part of the Global Positioning System.
103	21 October 1989	09:31	Delta II	Thor-Delta 6925	USA-47 (GPS II-4)	Success	Part of the Global Positioning System.
104	24 January 1990	22:55	Delta II	Thor-Delta 6925	USA-50 (GPS II-6)	Success	Part of the Global Positioning System.
105	26 March 1990	02:45	Delta II	Thor-Delta 6925	USA-54 (GPS II-7)	Success	Part of the Global Positioning System.
106	1 June 1990	21:48	Delta II	Thor-Delta 6920-10	ROSAT	Success	Space telescope designed to conduct x-ray astronomy. Collaboration between NASA and DLR.
107	2 August 1990	05:39	Delta II	Thor-Delta 6925	USA-63 (GPS II-8)	Success	Part of the Global Positioning System.
108	1 October 1990	21:56	Delta II	Thor-Delta 6925	USA-64 (GPS II-9)	Success	Part of the Global Positioning System.
109	26 November 1990	21:39	Delta II	Thor-Delta 7925	USA-66 (GPS IIA-1)	Success	Part of the Global Positioning System. First Delta II 7000 launch.
110	4 July 1991	02:32	Delta II	Thor-Delta 7925	USA-71 (GPS IIA-2)	Success	Part of the Global Positioning System.
111	7 June 1992	16:40	Delta II	Thor-Delta 6920-10	Extreme Ultraviolet Explorer	Success	Part of the Explorer program, a space telescope designed at conducting ultraviolet astronomy.
112	24 July 1992	14:26	Delta II	Thor-Delta 6925	Geotail	Success	Satellite designed to study Earth's magnetosphere, a collaboration between NASA and ISAS. Final launch of the Delta II 6000.
113	9 September 1992	08:57	Delta II	Thor-Delta 7925-9.5	USA-84 (GPS IIA-6)	Success	Part of the Global Positioning System.
114	22 November 1992	23:54	Delta II	Thor-Delta 7925-9.5	USA-85 (GPS IIA-7)	Success	Part of the Global Positioning System.
115	3 February 1993	02:55	Delta II	Thor-Delta 7925	USA-88 (GPS IIA-9)	Success	Part of the Global Positioning System.
116	30 March 1993	03:09	Delta II	Thor-Delta 7925	USA-90 (GPS IIA-10)	Success	Part of the Global Positioning System.
117	13 May 1993	00:07	Delta II	Thor-Delta 7925	USA-91 (GPS IIA-11)	Success	Part of the Global Positioning System.
118	26 June 1993	13:27	Delta II	Thor-Delta 7925	USA-92 (GPS IIA-12)	Success	Part of the Global Positioning System.
119	8 December 1993	00:48	Delta II	Thor-Delta 7925	NATO 4B	Success	
120	10 March 1994	03:40	Delta II	Thor-Delta 7925	USA-100 (GPS IIA-15)	Success	Part of the Global Positioning System.
121	30 December 1995	13:48	Delta II	Thor-Delta 7920-10	Rossi X-ray Timing Explorer	Success	Part of the Explorer program, designed to conduct x-ray astronomy through tracking timing from sources.
122	16 July 1996	00:50	Delta II	Thor-Delta 7925	USA-126 (GPS IIA-17)	Success	Part of the Global Positioning System.
123	12 September 1996	08:49	Delta II	Thor-Delta 7925	USA-128 (GPS IIA-18)	Success	Part of the Global Positioning System.
124	7 November 1996	17:00	Delta II	Thor-Delta 7925	Mars Global Surveyor	Success	First launch of the Mars Exploration Program, designed to study the titular planet and characteristics like geology and climate from orbit. First Delta II launch to another planet, and first successful American mission to Mars since Viking 2 in 1975.
125	17 January 1997	16:28	Delta II	Thor-Delta 7925-9.5	GPS IIR-1	Failure	Part of the Global Positioning System. Burnthrough in one of the solid rocket boosters activated range safety protocols 13 seconds after launch, damaging and scattering debris across the pad, nearby cars, and the adjacent Air Force Space and Missile Museum.
126	20 May 1997	22:39	Delta II	Thor-Delta 7925-9.5	Thor II	Success	
127	23 July 1997	03:43	Delta II	Thor-Delta 7925-9.5	USA-132 (GPS IIR-2)	Success	Part of the Global Positioning System. Last Delta II flight operated by McDonnell Douglas prior to their merger with Boeing.
128	25 August 1997	14:39	Delta II	Thor-Delta 7920-8	Advanced Composition Explorer	Success	Part of the Explorer program, designed to study the solar wind and interplanetary medium from a Lissajous orbit.
129	6 November 1997	00:30	Delta II	Thor-Delta 7925	USA-134 (GPS IIA-19)	Success	Part of the Global Positioning System.
130	14 February 1998	14:34	Delta II	Thor-Delta 7420-10C	Globalstar-1	Success	
131	24 April 1998	22:38	Delta II	Thor-Delta 7420-10C	Globalstar-2	Success	
132	10 June 1998	00:35	Delta II	Thor-Delta 7925-9.5	Thor III	Success	
133	24 October 1998	12:08	Delta II	Thor-Delta 7326	Deep Space 1	Success	First launch of the New Millennium Program, designed to demonstrate new technologies through exploring 9969 Braille and 19P/Borrelly. First NASA spacecraft to use ion propulsion.
134	11 December 1998	18:45	Delta II	Thor-Delta 7425	Mars Climate Orbiter	Success	Part of the Mars Exploration Program, designed to study the titular planet and characteristics such as its climate and atmosphere from orbit. Launch was a success, but a measurement mismatch between NASA's SI units and manufacturer Lockheed Martin's US customary resulted in the spacecraft burning up in the atmosphere during orbit insertion.
135	7 February 1999	21:04	Delta II	Thor-Delta 7426	Stardust	Success	Part of the Discovery Program, designed to return samples from the coma of comet 81P/Wild. First unmanned sample-return mission from NASA.
136	24 June 1999	15:44	Delta II	Thor-Delta 7320-10	Far Ultraviolet Spectroscopic Explorer	Success	Part of the Explorer program, a space telescope designed to conduct ultraviolet astronomy, specifically with detecting deuterium in the early universe.
137	25 July 1999	07:46	Delta II	Thor-Delta 7420-10C	Globalstar-5	Success	
138	7 October 1999	12:51	Delta II	Thor-Delta 7925-9.5	USA-145 (GPS IIR-3)	Success	Part of the Global Positioning System.
139	11 May 2000	01:48	Delta II	Thor-Delta 7925-9.5	USA-150 (GPS IIR-4)	Success	Part of the Global Positioning System.
140	16 July 2000	09:17	Delta II	Thor-Delta 7925-9.5	USA-151 (GPS IIR-5)	Success	Part of the Global Positioning System.
141	10 November 2000	17:14	Delta II	Thor-Delta 7925-9.5	USA-154 (GPS IIR-6)	Success	Part of the Global Positioning System.
142	30 January 2001	07:55	Delta II	Thor-Delta 7925-9.5	USA-156 (GPS IIR-7)	Success	Part of the Global Positioning System.
143	7 April 2001	15:02	Delta II	Thor-Delta 7925-9.5	2001 Mars Odyssey	Success	Part of the Mars Exploration Program, designed to study the titular planet from orbit. Set record for longest operational spacecraft around another celestial body.
144	8 August 2001	16:13	Delta II	Thor-Delta 7326-9.5	Genesis	Success	Part of the Discovery Program, designed to return samples of the solar wind. Launch and mission was a success, but drogue parachute failure led to return capsule crashing onto surface, with most samples getting contaminated.
145	3 July 2002	06:47	Delta II	Thor-Delta 7425	CONTOUR	Success	Part of the Discovery Program, designed to explore comets such as 2P/Encke, 73P/Schwassmann–Wachmann, and 6P/d'Arrest. Launch was a success, but spacecraft contact was lost a month into mission.
146	31 March 2003	22:09	Delta II	Thor-Delta 7925-9.5	USA-168 (GPS IIR-9)	Success	Part of the Global Positioning System.
147	10 June 2003	15:58	Delta II	Thor-Delta 7925-9.5	Mars Exploration Rover-A Spirit	Success	First of two launches of the Mars Exploration Rover mission, two rovers designed to explore the titular planet's surface for extended periods of time.
148	21 December 2003	08:05	Delta II	Thor-Delta 7925-9.5	USA-175 (GPS IIR-10)	Success	Part of the Global Positioning System.
149	20 November 2004	17:16	Delta II	Thor-Delta 7320-10C	Neil Gehrels Swift Observatory	Success	Part of the Explorer program, a space telescope designed to conduct gamma-ray astronomy and to study gamma-ray bursts.
150	26 September 2005	03:37	Delta II	Thor-Delta 7925-9.5	USA-183 (GPS IIR-M-1)	Success	Part of the Global Positioning System.
151	21 June 2006	22:15	Delta II	Thor-Delta 7925-9.5	Microsatellite Technology Experiment	Success	Two spacecraft and an experimental upper stage, also known as USA-187, USA-188, and USA-189 respectively. Collaboration between the Navy, Air Force, and DARPA.
152	25 September 2006	18:50	Delta II	Thor-Delta 7925-9.5	USA-190 (GPS IIR-M-2)	Success	Part of the Global Positioning System.
153	17 November 2006	19:12	Delta II	Thor-Delta 7925-9.5	USA-192 (GPS IIR-M-3)	Success	Part of the Global Positioning System. Final Delta II launch conduction by Boeing before transfer to United Launch Alliance.
154	4 August 2007	09:26	Delta II	Thor-Delta 7925	Phoenix	Success	Part of the Mars Exploration Program, designed to explore the titular planet and the soil, climate, and potential water in its polar regions.
155	17 October 2007	12:23	Delta II	Thor-Delta 7925-9.5	USA-196 (GPS IIR-M-4)	Success	Part of the Global Positioning System.
156	20 December 2007	20:04	Delta II	Thor-Delta 7925-9.5	USA-199 (GPS IIR-M-5)	Success	Part of the Global Positioning System.
157	15 March 2008	06:10	Delta II	Thor-Delta 7925-9.5	USA-201 (GPS IIR-M-6)	Success	Part of the Global Positioning System.
158	24 March 2009	08:34	Delta II	Thor-Delta 7925-9.5	USA-203 (GPS IIR-M-7)	Success	Part of the Global Positioning System.
160	17 August 2009	10:35	Delta II	Thor-Delta 7925	USA-206 (GPS IIR-M-8)	Success	Part of the Global Positioning System. Final Delta and Thor launch from SLC-17A. Most recent launch from SLC-17A.

=== SLC-17B ===
- Thor
- Thor-Ablestar
- Delta I
- Delta II
- Delta III

==== Thor and early Delta ====
Thor and Thor-Ablestar launches operated by the United States Air Force. Thor-Delta launches operated by NASA.

No.	Date	Time (UTC)	Launch vehicle	Configuration	Payload	Result	Remarks
1	26 January 1957	Unknown	PGM-17 Thor	Thor DM-18	Suborbital test	Failure	Maiden flight of the PGM-17 Thor and of the Delta family. Contaminated liquid oxygen caused a loss of trust, resulting with vehicle falling back onto pad and exploding.
2	20 April 1957	04:33	PGM-17 Thor	Thor DM-18	Suborbital test	Failure	Erroneous console readout resulted in range safety protocols being mistakenly engaged 35 seconds after launch.
3	20 September 1957	Unknown	PGM-17 Thor	Thor DM-18	Suborbital test	Success	First successful Thor launch and from LC-17.
4	11 October 1957	16:33	PGM-17 Thor	Thor DM-18	Suborbital test	Failure	Turbopump failed 152 seconds after launch. Flight considered a partial success.
5	7 December 1957	22:11	PGM-17 Thor	Thor DM-18	Suborbital test	Success	
6	28 February 1958	13:08	PGM-17 Thor	Thor DM-18	Suborbital test	Failure	Engines prematurely shut down 109 seconds after launch.
7	19 April 1958	13:30	PGM-17 Thor	Thor DM-18	Suborbital test	Failure	Suspected fuel line obstruction led to loss of engine thrust, with vehicle falling back onto pad and exploding.
8	13 June 1958	15:06	PGM-17 Thor	Thor DM-18	Suborbital test	Success	
9	13 July 1958	06:36	PGM-17 Thor	Thor DM-18	Suborbital test	Success	BECO and warhead separation was never received. Flight considered success otherwise.
10	26 July 1958	06:40	PGM-17 Thor	Thor DM-18	Suborbital test	Failure	Valve malfunction led to loss of thrust and vehicle breakup 55 seconds after launch.
11	5 November 1958	08:53	PGM-17 Thor	Thor DM-18A	Suborbital test	Failure	Flight control failure led to RSO protocols being activated 58 seconds after launch.
12	26 November 1958	09:09	PGM-17 Thor	Thor DM-18A	Suborbital test	Partial failure	Guidance system power failure led to warhead overshooting target by 22 miles.
13	17 December 1958	04:00	PGM-17 Thor	Thor DM-18A	Suborbital test	Success	
14	30 January 1959	23:53	PGM-17 Thor	Thor DM-18A	Suborbital test	Success	
15	27 March 1959	04:02	PGM-17 Thor	Thor DM-18A	Suborbital test	Success	
16	23 April 1959	05:30	PGM-17 Thor	Thor DM-18A	Suborbital test	Success	
17	12 May 1959	17:35	PGM-17 Thor	Thor DM-18A	Suborbital test	Success	
18	30 June 1959	02:37	PGM-17 Thor	Thor DM-18A	Suborbital test	Success	
19	21 July 1959	07:33	PGM-17 Thor	Thor DM-18A	Suborbital test	Failure	Pitch and roll programs failed to initiate, leading to RSO protocols 40 seconds after launch.
20	6 August 1959	02:48	PGM-17 Thor	Thor DM-18A	Suborbital test	Success	
21	27 August 1959	12:30	PGM-17 Thor	Thor DM-18A	Suborbital test	Success	
22	22 September 1959	18:00	PGM-17 Thor	Thor DM-18A	Suborbital test	Success	
23	14 October 1959	04:15	PGM-17 Thor	Thor DM-18A	Suborbital test	Success	
24	3 November 1959	Unknown	PGM-17 Thor	Thor DM-18A	Suborbital test	Success	
25	19 November 1959	Unknown	PGM-17 Thor	Thor DM-18A	Suborbital test	Success	
26	17 December 1959	Unknown	PGM-17 Thor	Thor DM-18A	Suborbital test	Success	
27	13 April 1960	12:02	Thor-Ablestar	Thor DM-21 / Ablestar	Transit 1B	Success	First successful launch of the Transit Satellite System. Maiden flight of the Thor-Ablestar and first orbital launch from LC-17B.
28	22 June 1960	05:54	Thor-Ablestar	Thor DM-21 / Ablestar	Transit 2A and GRAB-1	Success	Part of the Transit Satellite System.
29	18 August 1960	19:58	Thor-Ablestar	Thor DM-21 / Ablestar	Courier 1A	Failure	Experimental communications satellite. Launch suffered premature first stage cutoff, leading to RSO protocols 150 seconds after launch.
30	4 October 1960	17:50	Thor-Ablestar	Thor DM-21 / Ablestar	Courier 1B	Success	Reflight of Courier 1 following 1A's failure. Became first active relay communications satellite.
31	30 November 1960	19:50	Thor-Ablestar	Thor DM-21 / Ablestar	Transit 3A and GRAB-2	Failure	Part of the Transit Satellite System. Premature first stage cutoff lead to RSO protocols. Debris fell onto post-revolutionary Cuba, helping lead to polar launches being moved to Vandenberg Air Force Base in California.
32	22 February 1961	03:45	Thor-Ablestar	Thor DM-21 / Ablestar	Transit 3B and Lofti 1	Success	Part of the Transit Satellite System.
33	29 June 1961	04:22	Thor-Ablestar	Thor DM-21 / Ablestar	Transit 4A and GRAB-3	Success	Part of the Transit Satellite System.
34	15 November 1961	22:26	Thor-Ablestar	Thor DM-21 / Ablestar	Transit 4B and TRAAC	Success	Part of the Transit Satellite System.
35	24 January 1961	09:30	Thor-Ablestar	Thor DM-21 / Ablestar	GRAB-4 and other payloads	Failure	Second stage suffered from limited thrust, leading to payloads failing to reach orbit.
36	10 May 1961	12:06	Thor-Ablestar	Thor DM-21 / Ablestar	ANNA 1A	Failure	Second stage failed to ignite, leading to payload failing to reach orbit.
37	10 July 1962	08:35	Thor-Delta	Thor DM-19 / Delta	Telstar 1	Success	First ever telecommunications satellite, broadcasting television signals across the Atlantic Ocean. First Delta launch from LC-17B, and first commercial launch from Cape Canaveral.
38	2 October 1962	22:11	Delta A	Thor DM-21 / Delta-A	Explorer 14	Success	Part of the Explorer program, aiming to study cosmic rays and other electromagnetic activity.
39	27 October 1962	23:15	Delta A	Thor DM-21 / Delta-A	Explorer 15	Success	Part of the Explorer program, aiming to study cosmic rays and other electromagnetic activity.
40	14 February 1963	05:35	Delta B	Thor DM-21 / Delta-B	Syncom 1	Success	Part of the Syncom series of experimental communication satellites. Launch was a success, but payload shortly failed.
41	7 May 1963	11:38	Delta B	Thor DM-21 / Delta-B	Telstar 2	Success	
42	19 June 1963	09:50	Delta B	Thor DM-21 / Delta-B	TIROS-7	Success	Part of the TIROS series of weather satellites.
43	18 September 1963	09:39	Thor DSV-2	Thor DSV-2F	ASSET-1	Success	Suborbital flight. Part of the ASSET program, testing uncrewed atmospheric reentry vehicles.
44	27 November 1963	02:30	Delta C	Thor DSV-2A / Delta-D / Altair-2	Explorer 18	Success	Part of the Explorer program, aiming to study cosmic rays and other electromagnetic activity.
45	21 December 1963	09:30	Delta B	Thor DM-21 / Delta-B	TIROS-8	Success	Part of the TIROS series of weather satellites.
46	21 January 1964	21:14	Delta B	Thor DM-21 / Delta-B	Relay 2	Success	
47	24 March 1964	12:15	Thor DSV-2	Thor DSV-2G	ASSET-2	Failure	Suborbital flight. Part of the ASSET program, testing uncrewed atmospheric reentry vehicles. Second stage fired intermittently, leading to RSO protocols.
48	22 July 1964	15:39	Thor DSV-2	Thor DSV-2G	ASSET-3	Success	Suborbital flight. Part of the ASSET program, testing uncrewed atmospheric reentry vehicles.
49	29 October 1964	03:35	Thor DSV-2	Thor DSV-2F	ASSET-4	Success	Suborbital flight. Part of the ASSET program, testing uncrewed atmospheric reentry vehicles.
50	9 December 1964	02:00	Thor DSV-2	Thor DSV-2F	ASSET-5	Success	Suborbital flight. Part of the ASSET program, testing uncrewed atmospheric reentry vehicles.
51	3 February 1965	16:33	Delta C	Thor DSV-2A / Delta-D / Altair-2	OSO-2	Success	Part of the Orbiting Solar Observatory series of heliophysics satellites.
52	23 February 1965	14:36	Thor DSV-2	Thor DSV-2G	ASSET-6	Success	Suborbital flight. Part of the ASSET program, testing uncrewed atmospheric reentry vehicles.
53	29 May 1965	12:00	Delta C	Thor DSV-2A / Delta-D / Altair-2	Explorer 28	Success	Part of the Explorer program, aiming to study cosmic rays and other electromagnetic activity.
54	2 July 1965	04:04	Delta C	Thor DSV-2A / Delta-D / Altair-2	TIROS-10	Success	Part of the TIROS series of weather satellites.
55	25 August 1965	15:17	Delta C	Thor DSV-2A / Delta-D / Altair-2	OSO-C	Failure	Part of the Orbiting Solar Observatory series of heliophysics satellites. Third stage ignited while still attached to second stage, leading to loss of vehicle.
56	28 February 1966	13:58	Delta E	Thor DSV-2C / Delta-E / Altair-2	ESSA-2	Success	Part of the TOS series of weather satellites for the ESSA.
57	25 May 1966	14:00	Delta C1	Thor DSV-2A / Delta-D / FW-4D	Explorer 32	Success	Part of the Explorer program, aiming to study earth's upper atmosphere.
58	26 October 1966	23:05	Delta E1	Thor DSV-2C / Delta-E / FW-4D	Intelsat 2-1	Success	
59	11 January 1967	10:55	Delta E1	Thor DSV-2C / Delta-E / FW-4D	Intelsat 2-2	Success	
60	23 March 1967	01:30	Delta E1	Thor DSV-2C / Delta-E / FW-4D	Intelsat 2-3	Success	
61	19 July 1967	14:19	Delta E1	Thor DSV-2C / Delta-E / FW-4D	Explorer 35	Success	Part of the Explorer program, aiming to study cosmic rays and other electromagnetic activity.
62	7 September 1967	22:04	Delta G	Thor DSV-2C / Delta-E	Biosatellite 2	Success	Second of three launches of the Biosatellite program, studying how various lifeforms operate in space.
63	28 September 1967	00:45	Delta E1	Thor DSV-2C / Delta-E / FW-4D	Intelsat 2-4	Success	
64	18 October 1967	16:04	Delta C	Thor DSV-2A / Delta-D / Altair-2	OSO-4	Success	Part of the Orbiting Solar Observatory series of heliophysics satellites.
65	13 December 1967	14:08	Delta E1	Thor DSV-2C / Delta-E / FW-4D	Pioneer 8	Success	Part of the Pioneer program, aiming to study interplanetary space from great distance to Earth. Launched as Pioneer C. Third of five heliocentric orbit-centered Pioneer satellites.
66	8 November 1968	09:46	Delta E1	Thor DSV-2C / Delta-E / FW-4D	Pioneer 9	Success	Part of the Pioneer program, aiming to study interplanetary space from great distance to Earth. Launched as Pioneer D. Fourth of five heliocentric orbit-centered Pioneer satellites.
67	5 December 1968	18:55	Delta E1	Thor DSV-2C / Delta-E / FW-4D	HEOS 1	Success	First launch for the ESRO from LC-17.
68	22 January 1969	16:48	Delta C1	Thor DSV-2A / Delta-D / FW-4D	OSO-5	Success	Part of the Orbiting Solar Observatory series of heliophysics satellites.
69	26 February 1969	07:47	Delta E1	Thor DSV-2C / Delta-E / FW-4D	ESSA-9	Success	Part of the TOS series of weather satellites for the ESSA.

==== Later Delta I ====
All launches operated by NASA.

No.	Date	Time (UTC)	Launch vehicle	Configuration	Payload	Result	Remarks
70	23 September 1972	13:20	Delta 1000	Thor-Delta 1604	Explorer 47	Success	Part of the Explorer program, aiming to study cosmic rays and other electromagnetic activity. First Delta launch from LC-17 using a numerical designation.
71	10 November 1972	01:14	Delta 1000	Thor-Delta 1914	Anik-A1	Success	
72	20 April 1973	23:47	Delta 1000	Thor-Delta 1914	Anik-A2	Success	
73	10 June 1973	14:13	Delta 1000	Thor-Delta 1913	Explorer 49	Success	Part of the Explorer program, aiming to conduct radio astronomy. First Delta launch going to another celestial body, as payload traveled to lunar orbit to minimize radio interference from Earth.
74	26 October 1973	02:26	Delta 1000	Thor-Delta 1604	Explorer 50	Success	Part of the Explorer program, aiming to study cosmic rays and other electromagnetic activity.
75	19 January 1974	01:38	Delta 2000	Thor-Delta 2313	Skynet-2A	Failure	Loose piece of insulation damaged onboard electronics during launch, leading to loss of control.
76	13 April 1974	21:33	Delta 2000	Thor-Delta 2914	Westar-1	Success	
77	17 May 1974	10:31	Delta 2000	Thor-Delta 2914	SMS-1	Success	Experimental weather satellite designed to demonstrate feasibility at geosynchronous orbit.
78	10 October 1974	22:53	Delta 2000	Thor-Delta 2914	Westar-2	Success	
79	23 November 1974	00:28	Delta 2000	Thor-Delta 2313	Skynet-2B	Success	
80	19 December 1974	02:39	Delta 2000	Thor-Delta 2914	Symphonie-1	Success	
81	6 February 1975	22:02	Delta 2000	Thor-Delta 2914	SMS-2	Success	Experimental weather satellite designed to demonstrate feasibility at geosynchronous orbit.
82	7 May 1975	23:35	Delta 2000	Thor-Delta 2914	Anik-A3	Success	
83	21 June 1975	11:43	Delta 1000	Thor-Delta 1910	OSO-8	Success	Part of the Orbiting Solar Observatory series of heliophysics satellites.
84	16 October 1975	22:40	Delta 2000	Thor-Delta 2914	GOES-1	Success	Launched as GOES-A. First launch of the Geostationary Operational Environmental Satellites system of satellites.
85	20 November 1975	02:06	Delta 2000	Thor-Delta 2910	Explorer 55	Success	Part of the Explorer program, aiming to study earth's upper atmosphere and ionosphere.
86	17 January 1976	23:28	Delta 2000	Thor-Delta 2914	CTS 1 Hermes	Success	
87	22 April 1976	20:46	Delta 2000	Thor-Delta 2914	NATO 3A	Success	
88	20 April 1977	10:15	Delta 2000	Thor-Delta 2914	ESA-GEOS-1	Partial failure	Third stage separated prematurely, leading to failure of spin stabilization.
89	16 June 1977	10:51	Delta 2000	Thor-Delta 2914	GOES-2	Success	Launched as GOES-B. Part of the Geostationary Operational Environmental Satellites system of satellites.
90	14 July 1977	14:56	Delta 2000	Thor-Delta 2914	GMS-1	Success	
91	22 October 1977	13:53	Delta 2000	Thor-Delta 2914	ISEE-1 and ISEE-2	Success	Part of the Explorer program, aiming to study the interplanetary magnetic field. First two of three satellites of the International Sun-Earth Explorer program between NASA and ESA.
92	15 December 1977	00:47	Delta 2000	Thor-Delta 2914	CS-1	Success	
93	7 April 1978	22:01	Delta 2000	Thor-Delta 2914	BSE-1	Success	
94	16 June 1978	10:49	Delta 2000	Thor-Delta 2914	GOES-3	Success	Launched as GOES-C. Part of the Geostationary Operational Environmental Satellites system of satellites.
95	12 August 1978	15:12	Delta 2000	Thor-Delta 2914	International Cometary Explorer	Success	Launched as ICEE-3. Part of the Explorer program, aiming to study the interplanetary magnetic field before studying comets like 1P/Halley and 21P/Giacobini–Zinner. First ever satellite to visit a Lagrange point. Third of three satellites of the International Sun-Earth Explorer program between NASA and ESA.
96	19 November 1978	00:46	Delta 2000	Thor-Delta 2914	NATO 3C	Success	
97	30 January 1979	21:42	Delta 2000	Thor-Delta 2914	SCATHA (P78-2)	Success	
98	26 August 1982	23:10	Delta 3000	Thor-Delta 3920	Anik D1	Success	
99	28 October 1982	01:27	Delta 3000	Thor-Delta 3924	Satcom 5	Success	
100	11 April 1983	22:39	Delta 3000	Thor-Delta 3924	Satcom 6	Success	
101	28 June 1983	23:08	Delta 3000	Thor-Delta 3920	Galaxy 1	Success	
102	8 September 1983	22:52	Delta 3000	Thor-Delta 3920	Satcom 7	Success	
103	21 September 1984	22:18	Delta 3000	Thor-Delta 3920	Galaxy-3	Success	
104	5 September 1986	15:08	Delta 3000	Thor-Delta 3920	USA-19 (Vector Sum Experiment)	Success	Experimental in-orbit ASAT satellite for the SDI.
105	20 March 1987	22:22	Delta 3000	Thor-Delta 3920	Palapa B2P	Success	
106	8 February 1988	22:07	Delta 3000	Thor-Delta 3910	USA-30 (Thrusted Vector Experiment)	Success	Experimental in-orbit ASAT satellite for the SDI.
107	24 March 1989	21:50	Delta 3000	Thor-Delta 3920-8	USA-36 (Delta Star)	Success	Experimental in-orbit ASAT satellite for the SDI.

==== Delta 4000, II, and III ====
Delta 4000 launches operated by NASA. Delta II launches before August 1997 operated by McDonnell Douglas. Launches between then and 2007 operated by Boeing. Launches since 2007 operated by United Launch Alliance.

No.	Date	Time (UTC)	Launch vehicle	Configuration	Payload	Result	Remarks
108	27 August 1989	22:59	Delta 4000	Thor-Delta 4925-8	BSB-R1	Success	
109	11 December 1989	18:10	Delta II	Thor-Delta 6925	USA-49 (GPS II-5)	Success	Part of the Global Positioning System. First Delta II launch from LC-17B.
110	14 February 1990	16:15	Delta II	Thor-Delta 6920-8	USA-51 (LACE) and USA-52 (RME)	Success	
111	13 April 1990	22:28	Delta II	Thor-Delta 6925-8	Palapa B2R	Success	
112	12 June 1990	05:52	Delta 4000	Thor-Delta 4925-8	INSAT 1D	Success	Final flight of the Delta I.
113	18 August 1990	00:42	Delta II	Thor-Delta 6925	Thor 1	Success	
114	30 October 1990	23:16	Delta II	Thor-Delta 6925	Inmarsat-2 F1	Success	
115	8 January 1991	00:53	Delta II	Thor-Delta 7925	NATO 4A	Success	
116	8 March 1991	23:03	Delta II	Thor-Delta 6925	Inmarsat-2 F2	Success	
117	13 April 1991	00:09	Delta II	Thor-Delta 7925	ASC-2 (Spacenet F4)	Success	
118	29 May 1991	22:55	Delta II	Thor-Delta 7925	Aurora 2	Success	
119	23 February 1992	22:29	Delta II	Thor-Delta 7925-9.5	USA-79 (GPS IIA-3)	Success	Part of the Global Positioning System.
120	10 April 1992	03:20	Delta II	Thor-Delta 7925-9.5	USA-80 (GPS IIA-4)	Success	Part of the Global Positioning System.
121	14 May 1992	00:40	Delta II	Thor-Delta 7925	Palapa B4	Success	
122	7 July 1992	09:20	Delta II	Thor-Delta 7925-9.5	USA-83 (GPS IIA-5)	Success	Part of the Global Positioning System.
123	31 August 1992	10:41	Delta II	Thor-Delta 7925	Satcom C4	Success	
124	12 October 1992	09:47	Delta II	Thor-Delta 7925	DFS Kopernikus-3	Success	
125	18 December 1992	22:16	Delta II	Thor-Delta 7925-9.5	USA-87 (GPS IIA-8)	Success	Part of the Global Positioning System.
126	30 August 1993	12:38	Delta II	Thor-Delta 7925	USA-94 (GPS IIA-13)	Success	Part of the Global Positioning System.
127	26 October 1993	17:04	Delta II	Thor-Delta 7925	USA-96 (GPS IIA-14)	Success	Part of the Global Positioning System.
128	19 February 1994	23:45	Delta II	Thor-Delta 7925-8	Galaxy 1R	Success	
129	1 November 1994	09:31	Delta II	Thor-Delta 7925-10	Wind	Success	Part of the International Solar-Terrestrial Physics Science Initiative, a heliophysics spacecraft designed to study the solar wind from the L_{1} Lagrange point. First Delta II launch into a heliocentric orbit.
130	5 August 1995	11:10	Delta II	Thor-Delta 7925-9.5	Koreasat 1	Partial failure	One solid rocket booster failed to separate, slowing vehicle and limiting orbital velocity. Spacecraft eventually entered correct orbit at the expense of a substantially reduced operational life.
131	14 January 1996	11:10	Delta II	Thor-Delta 7925	Koreasat-2	Success	
132	17 February 1996	20:43	Delta II	Thor-Delta 7925-8	NEAR Shoemaker	Success	First mission in the Discovery Program, aimed at exploring 433 Eros. First spacecraft to enter orbit of and land on an asteroid. First Delta II launch to another celestial body.
133	28 March 1996	00:21	Delta II	Thor-Delta 7925	USA-117 (GPS IIA-16)	Success	Part of the Global Positioning System.
134	24 May 1996	01:10	Delta II	Thor-Delta 7925	Galaxy 9	Success	
135	4 December 1996	06:58	Delta II	Thor-Delta 7925	Mars Pathfinder	Success	Part of the Discovery Program, aimed at exploring Mars and developing a spacecraft under administrator Daniel Goldin's "faster, better, cheaper" approach. First Mars landing mission since Viking 2 in 1975. Flew with Sojourner, the first operational Mars rover.
136	10 January 1998	00:32	Delta II	Thor-Delta 7925-9.5	Skynet 4D	Success	
137	27 August 1998	01:17	Delta III	Thor-Delta 8930	Galaxy 10	Failure	Maiden flight of the Delta III. Control problems and depletion of hydraulic fluid being used led to range safety protocols being activated during ascent.
138	22 November 1998	23:54	Delta II	Thor-Delta 7925-9.5	BONUM-1	Success	
139	3 January 1999	20:21	Delta II	Thor-Delta 7425	Mars Polar Lander	Success	Part of the Mars Exploration Program, designed to explore the titular planet and the soil and climate of its polar regions. Launch was a success, but lander crashed on the surface during entry, descent and landing.
140	5 May 1999	01:00	Delta III	Thor-Delta 8930	Orion 3	Failure	Delta III second stage suffered engine failure, stranding payload in low Earth orbit.
141	10 June 1999	13:48	Delta II	Thor-Delta 7420-10C	Globalstar-3	Success	
142	10 July 1999	08:45	Delta II	Thor-Delta 7420-10C	Globalstar-4	Success	
143	17 August 1999	04:37	Delta II	Thor-Delta 7420-10C	Globalstar-6	Success	
144	8 February 2000	21:24	Delta II	Thor-Delta 7420-10C	Globalstar-7	Success	
145	23 August 2000	11:05	Delta III	Thor-Delta 8930	DM-F3	Partial failure	Demonstration satellite. Payload was placed in lower than expected orbit. Final flight of the Delta III.
146	18 May 2001	17:45	Delta II	Thor-Delta 7925-9.5	NROL-17	Success	NRO launch. Technology demonstration satellite, also known as GeoLITE or USA-158. Was used as a test bed for laser and UHF communication.
147	30 June 2001	19:46	Delta II	Thor-Delta 7425-10	Wilkinson Microwave Anisotropy Probe	Success	Part of the Explorer program, a space telescope designed to create a survey of the cosmic microwave background radiation. First space telescope to be placed into a heliocentric orbit.
148	29 January 2003	18:06	Delta II	Thor-Delta 7925-9.5	USA-166 (GPS IIR-8)	Success	Part of the Global Positioning System.
149	8 July 2003	03:18	Delta II	Thor-Delta 7925H-9.5	Mars Exploration Rover-B Opportunity	Success	Second of two launches of the Mars Exploration Rover mission, two rovers designed to explore the titular planet's surface for extended periods of time. Maiden flight of the Delta II Heavy.
150	25 August 2003	05:35	Delta II	Thor-Delta 7920H-9.5	Spitzer Space Telescope	Success	Part of the Great Observatories program, a space telescope designed to conduct infrared astronomy.
151	20 March 2004	17:53	Delta II	Thor-Delta 7925-9.5	USA-177 (GPS IIR-11)	Success	Part of the Global Positioning System.
152	23 June 2004	22:54	Delta II	Thor-Delta 7925-9.5	USA-178 (GPS IIR-12)	Success	Part of the Global Positioning System.
153	3 August 2004	06:15	Delta II	Thor-Delta 7925H-9.5	MESSENGER	Success	Part of the Discovery Program, aimed at exploring Mercury such as mapping areas not covered by Mariner 10. First spacecraft to enter orbit of Mercury.
154	6 November 2004	05:39	Delta II	Thor-Delta 7925-9.5	USA-180 (GPS IIR-13)	Success	Part of the Global Positioning System.
155	12 January 2005	18:47	Delta II	Thor-Delta 7925-9.5	Deep Impact	Success	Part of the Discovery Program, aimed at studying the interior of comets via impacting one. First impactor of a celestial body besides the Moon, done with 9P/Tempel.
156	26 October 2006	00:52	Delta II	Thor-Delta 7925-10L	STEREO	Success	Part of the Solar Terrestrial Probes program, two spacecraft designed to observed the Sun and phenomena such as coronal mass ejections.
157	17 February 2007	23:01	Delta II	Thor-Delta 7925-10C	THEMIS	Success	Part of the Explorer program, five spacecraft designed to study Earth's magnetic field.
158	27 September 2007	11:34	Delta II	Thor-Delta 7925H-9.5	Dawn	Success	Part of the Discovery Program, designed to explore large asteroid belt objects like Ceres and Vesta. First spacecraft to enter orbit of two separate celestial objects, and first spacecraft to visit and enter orbit of a dwarf planet.
159	11 June 2008	16:05	Delta II	Thor-Delta 7920H-10C	Fermi Gamma-ray Space Telescope	Success	Space telescope designed to conduct gamma-ray astronomy. Collaboration between NASA, the DoE, and several international agencies.
160	7 March 2009	03:49	Delta II	Thor-Delta 7925-10L	Kepler Space Telescope	Success	Part of the Discovery Program, a space telescope designed to survey a small area of the sky to detect exoplanets through the transit method. Final Delta II flight to go into heliocentric orbit.
161	25 September 2009	12:20	Delta II	Thor-Delta 7920-10C	USA-208 (STSS Demo) and USA-209 (GMD Block 2006)	Success	Final military launch from a Delta II.
162	10 September 2011	13:08	Delta II	Thor-Delta 7920H-10C	GRAIL	Success	Part of the Discovery Program, two spacecraft designed to create a gravity map and study the composition of the Moon. Final flight of the Delta II Heavy and last Delta II launch beyond low Earth orbit. Final launch of a Thor-based rocket from Cape Canaveral. Most recent launch from SLC-17.

== Gallery ==
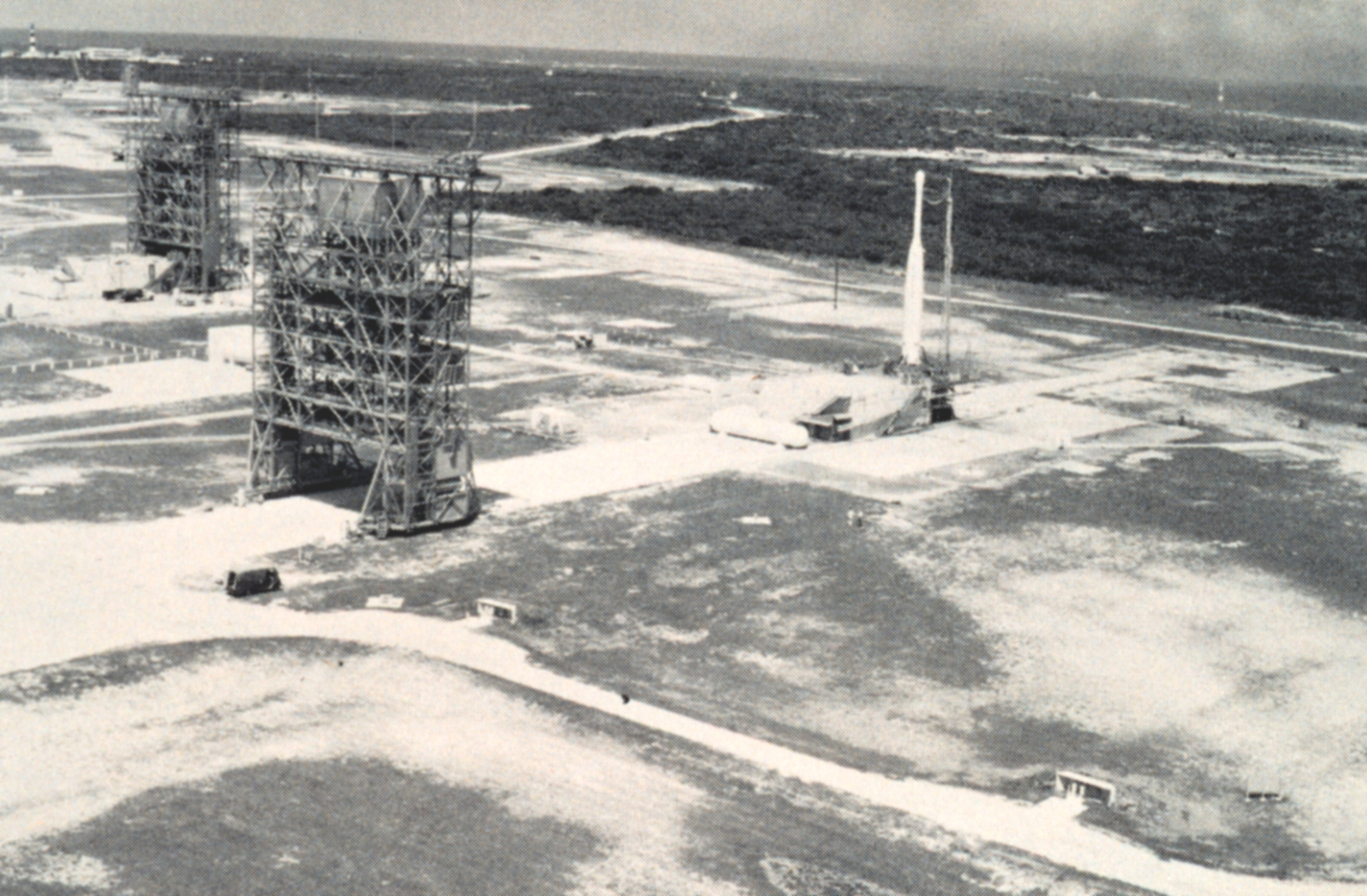
SLC-17 in the 1960s, holding a Thor-Delta carrying TIROS satellites

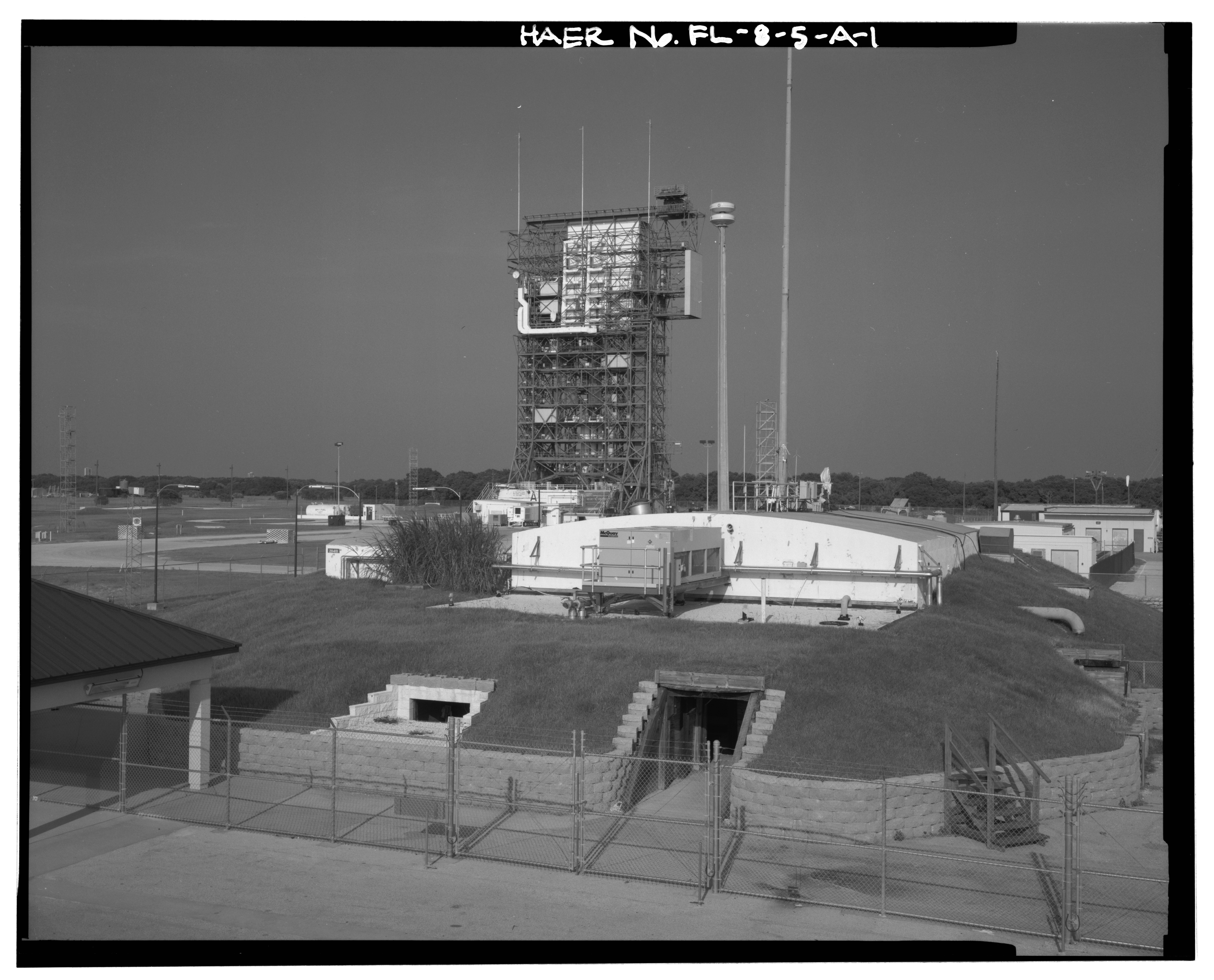
SLC-17 blockhouse with the Mobile Service Tower in the distance.

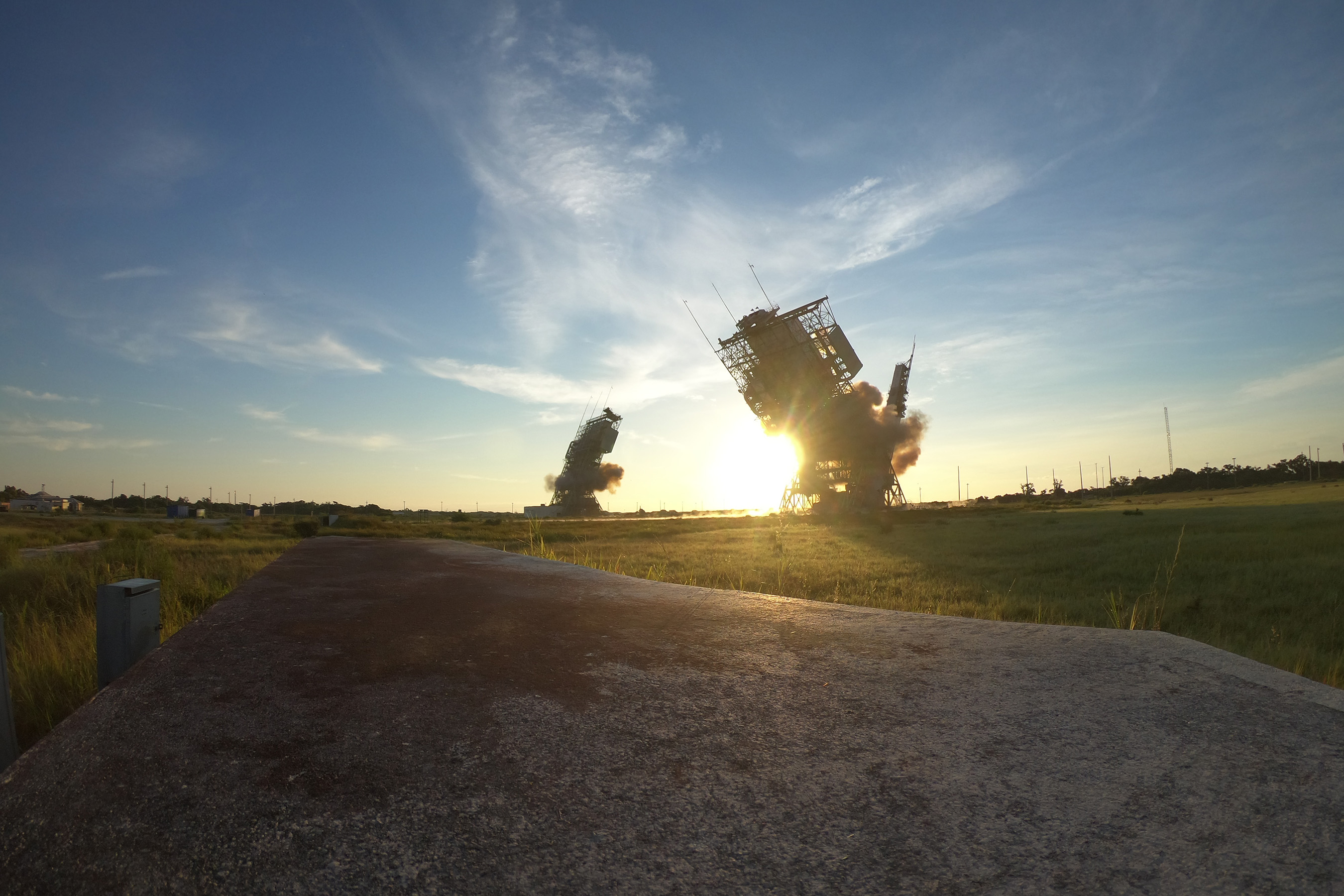
The two launch towers of SLC-17 getting demolished in 2018
