= USA-64 =

American navigation satellite used for GPS

- Names: Navstar 2-09; GPS II-9; GPS SVN-15
- Mission type: Navigation
- Operator: U.S. Air Force
- COSPAR ID: 1990-088A
- SATCAT no.: 20830
- Mission duration: 7.5 years (planned); 16.5 years (achieved)

Spacecraft properties
- Spacecraft: GPS II
- Spacecraft type: GPS Block II
- Manufacturer: Rockwell International
- Launch mass: 840 kg (1,850 lb)
- Dimensions: 5.3 m (17 ft) of long
- Power: 710 watts

Start of mission
- Launch date: 1 October 1990, 21:56:00 UTC
- Rocket: Delta II 6925-9.5 (Delta D199)
- Launch site: Cape Canaveral, LC-17A
- Contractor: McDonnell Douglas
- Entered service: 31 October 1990

End of mission
- Declared: 17 November 2006
- Deactivated: 14 March 2007

Orbital parameters
- Reference system: Geocentric orbit
- Regime: Medium Earth orbit (Semi-synchronous)
- Slot: D5 (slot 5 plane D)
- Perigee altitude: 19,972 km (12,410 mi)
- Apogee altitude: 20,390 km (12,670 mi)
- Inclination: 54.9°
- Period: 717.94 minutes

USA-64, also known as GPS II-9 and GPS SVN-15, was an American navigation satellite which formed part of the Global Positioning System. It was the last of nine Block II GPS satellites to be launched, which were the first operational GPS satellites to fly. It was also the last Block II satellite to be retired from service.

== Background ==
Global Positioning System (GPS) was developed by the U.S. Department of Defense to provide all-weather round-the-clock navigation capabilities for military ground, sea, and air forces. Since its implementation, GPS has also become an integral asset in numerous civilian applications and industries around the globe, including recreational used (e.g., boating, aircraft, hiking), corporate vehicle fleet tracking, and surveying. GPS employs 24 spacecraft in 20,200 km circular orbits inclined at 55.0°. These vehicles are placed in 6 orbit planes with four operational satellites in each plane.

GPS Block 2 was the operational system, following the demonstration system composed of Block 1 (Navstar 1 - 11) spacecraft. These spacecraft were 3-axis stabilized, nadir pointing using reaction wheels. Dual solar arrays supplied 710 watts of power. They used S-band (SGLS) communications for control and telemetry and Ultra high frequency (UHF) cross-link between spacecraft. The payload consisted of two L-band navigation signals at 1575.42 MHz (L1) and 1227.60 MHz (L2). Each spacecraft carried 2 rubidium and 2 Cesium clocks and nuclear detonation detection sensors. Built by Rockwell Space Systems for the U.S. Air force, the spacecraft measured 5.3 m across with solar panels deployed and had a design life of 7.5 years.

== Launch ==
USA-64 was launched at 21:56:00 UTC on 1 October 1990, atop a Delta II launch vehicle, flight number D199, flying in the 6925 configuration. The launch took place from Launch Complex 17A (LC-17A) at the Cape Canaveral Air Force Station (CCAFS), and placed USA-64 into a transfer orbit. The satellite raised itself into medium Earth orbit using a Star-37XFP apogee motor.

== Mission ==
On 31 October 1990, USA-64 was in an orbit with a perigee of 19,972 km (12,410 mi), an apogee of 20,390 km (12,670 mi), a period of 717.94 minutes, and 54.9° of inclination to the equator. It operated in slot 5 of plane D of the GPS constellation. The satellite had a mass of 840 kg (1,850 lb), and generated 710 watts of power. It had a design life of 7.5 years, having been added from active service on 17 November 2006 for testing, and ceased operations on 14 March 2007.
