= USA-84 =

American navigation satellite used for GPS

- Names: Navstar 2A-06; GPS IIA-6; GPS II-15; GPS SVN-27
- Mission type: Navigation
- Operator: U.S. Air Force
- COSPAR ID: 1992-058A
- SATCAT no.: 22108
- Mission duration: 7.5 years (planned); 24.5 years (achieved)

Spacecraft properties
- Spacecraft: GPS IIA
- Spacecraft type: GPS Block IIA
- Manufacturer: Rockwell International
- Launch mass: 840 kg (1,850 lb)
- Dimensions: 5.3 m (17 ft) of long
- Power: 710 watts

Start of mission
- Launch date: 9 September 1992, 08:57:00 UTC
- Rocket: Delta II 7925-9.5 (Delta D214)
- Launch site: Cape Canaveral, LC-17A
- Contractor: McDonnell Douglas
- Entered service: 11 October 1992

End of mission
- Disposal: Graveyard orbit
- Deactivated: 18 April 2017

Orbital parameters
- Reference system: Geocentric orbit
- Regime: Medium Earth orbit (Semi-synchronous)
- Slot: A4 (slot 4 plane A)
- Perigee altitude: 19,914 km (12,374 mi)
- Apogee altitude: 20,335 km (12,636 mi)
- Inclination: 54.7°
- Period: 717.98 minutes

USA-84, also known as GPS IIA-6, GPS II-15 and GPS SVN-27, is an American navigation satellite which forms part of the Global Positioning System. It was the sixth of nineteen Block IIA GPS satellites to be launched.

== Background ==
Global Positioning System (GPS) was developed by the U.S. Department of Defense to provide all-weather round-the-clock navigation capabilities for military ground, sea, and air forces. Since its implementation, GPS has also become an integral asset in numerous civilian applications and industries around the globe, including recreational used (e.g., boating, aircraft, hiking), corporate vehicle fleet tracking, and surveying. GPS employs 24 spacecraft in 20,200 km circular orbits inclined at 55.0°. These vehicles are placed in 6 orbit planes with four operational satellites in each plane.

GPS Block 2 was the operational system, following the demonstration system composed of Block 1 (Navstar 1 - 11) spacecraft. These spacecraft were 3-axis stabilized, nadir pointing using reaction wheels. Dual solar arrays supplied 710 watts of power. They used S-band (SGLS) communications for control and telemetry and Ultra high frequency (UHF) cross-link between spacecraft. The payload consisted of two L-band navigation signals at 1575.42 MHz (L1) and 1227.60 MHz (L2). Each spacecraft carried 2 rubidium and 2 Cesium clocks and nuclear detonation detection sensors. Built by Rockwell Space Systems for the U.S. Air force, the spacecraft measured 5.3 m across with solar panels deployed and had a design life of 7.5 years.

== Launch ==
USA-84 was launched at 08:57:00 UTC on 9 September 1992, atop a Delta II launch vehicle, flight number D214, flying in the 7925–9.5 configuration. The launch took place from Launch Complex 17A (LC-17A) at the Cape Canaveral Air Force Station (CCAFS), and placed USA-84 into a transfer orbit. The satellite raised itself into medium Earth orbit using a Star-37XFP apogee motor.

== Mission ==
On 11 October 1992, USA-84 was in an orbit with a perigee of 19,914 km (12,374 mi), an apogee of 20,335 km (12,636 mi), a period of 717.98 minutes, and 54.7° of inclination to the equator. It had PRN 27, and operated in slot 4 of plane A of the GPS constellation. The satellite has a mass of 840 kg (1,850 lb). It had a design life of 7.5 years, but was in service for twenty years, until its retirement in October 2012. It was then kept on orbit spare until its disposal in 2017, where it was placed in a disposal orbit approximately 1000 km above the operational constellation.
