= USA-156 =

American navigation satellite used for GPS

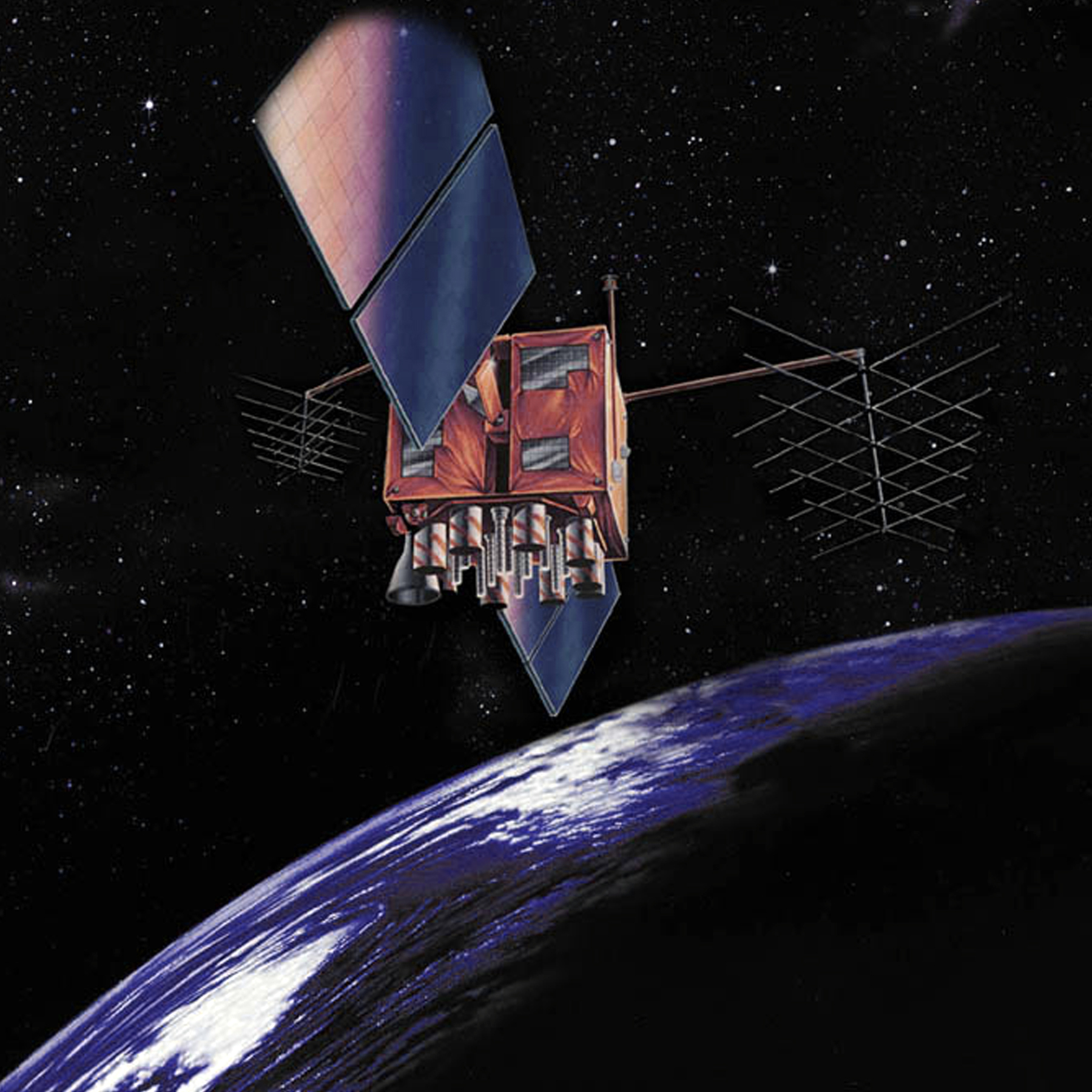
- A Block IIR GPS satellite
- Mission type: Navigation
- Operator: US Air Force
- COSPAR ID: 2001-004A
- SATCAT no.: 26690
- Mission duration: 10 years (planned)

Spacecraft properties
- Spacecraft type: GPS Block IIR
- Bus: AS-4000
- Manufacturer: Lockheed Martin
- Launch mass: 2,032 kilograms (4,480 lb)

Start of mission
- Launch date: 30 January 2001, 07:55:01 UTC
- Rocket: Delta II 7925-9.5, D283
- Launch site: Cape Canaveral SLC-17A

End of mission
- Disposal: Graveyard orbit
- Deactivated: 5 March 2018

Orbital parameters
- Reference system: Geocentric
- Regime: Medium Earth (Semi-synchronous)
- Perigee altitude: 20,104 kilometres (12,492 mi)
- Apogee altitude: 20,266 kilometres (12,593 mi)
- Inclination: 55 degrees
- Period: 718.08 minutes

USA-156, also known as GPS IIR-7 and GPS SVN-54, is an American navigation satellite which forms part of the Global Positioning System. It was the seventh Block IIR GPS satellite to be launched, out of thirteen in the original configuration, and twenty one overall. It was built by Lockheed Martin, using the AS-4000 satellite bus.

USA-156 was launched at 07:55:01 UTC on 30 January 2001, atop a Delta II carrier rocket, flight number D283, flying in the 7925–9.5 configuration. The launch took place from Space Launch Complex 17A at the Cape Canaveral Air Force Station, and placed USA-156 into a transfer orbit. The satellite raised itself into medium Earth orbit using a Star-37FM apogee motor.

By 2 February 2001, USA-156 was in an orbit with a perigee of 20,104 kilometres (12,492 mi), an apogee of 20,266 kilometres (12,593 mi), a period of 718.08 minutes, and 55 degrees of inclination to the equator. It is used to broadcast the PRN 18 signal, and operates in slot 4 of plane E of the GPS constellation. The satellite has a mass of 2,032 kilograms (4,480 lb), and a design life of 10 years. The satellite was retired in 2018.
