= List of GPS satellites =

Samples of three GPS satellites' orbits over a five-year period (2013 to 2018) USA-242 · USA-239 · USA-151 · Earth

As of 2 September 2026, 83 Global Positioning System navigation satellites have been built: 32 are launched and operational, 7 are in reserve or testing, 41 are retired, and 2 were lost during launch. One non-operational prototype satellite was never launched. The next launch is GPS IIIF SV11, with a targeted launch in 2028 on a Vulcan Centaur.

The constellation requires a minimum of 24 operational satellites, and allows for up to 32; typically, 31 are operational at any one time. A GPS receiver needs four satellites to work out its position in three dimensions.

SVNs are "space vehicle numbers" which are serial numbers assigned to each GPS satellite. PRNs are the "pseudo-random noise" sequences, or Gold codes, that each satellite transmits to differentiate itself from other satellites in the active constellation.

After being launched, GPS satellites enter a period of testing before their signals are set to "Healthy". During normal operations, certain signals may be set to "Unhealthy" to accommodate updates or testing. After decommissioning, most GPS satellites become on-orbit spares and may be recommissioned if needed. Permanently retired satellites are sent to a higher, less congested disposal orbit where their fuel is vented, batteries are intentionally depleted and communication is switched off.

== Satellites ==
=== Satellites by launch date ===
Satellite	Launch (UTC)	Carrier rocket	Launch site	Block	No.	SVN	PRN	Slot	LOS (Note: Length Of Service in days. Includes testing period(s).)	Status
	Remarks									
OPS 5111	22 February 1978; 23:44	Atlas E/F-SGS-1	VAFB, SLC-3E	I	1	01	04		2,703	Retired; 17 July 1985
OPS 5112	13 May 1978; 10:34	Atlas E/F-SGS-1	VAFB, SLC-3E	I	2	02	07		1,161	Retired; 16 July 1981
OPS 5113	7 October 1978; 00:28	Atlas E/F	VAFB, SLC-3E	I	3	03	06		4,973	Retired; 18 May 1992
OPS 5114	11 December 1978; 03:59	Atlas E/F	VAFB, SLC-3E	I	4	04	08		4,046	Retired; 14 October 1989
OPS 5114	Used for testing between February 1990 and May 1990.									
OPS 5117	9 February 1980; 23:08	Atlas E/F	VAFB, SLC-3E	I	5	05	05		1,389	Retired; 28 November 1983
OPS 5118	26 April 1980; 22:00	Atlas E/F	VAFB, SLC-3E	I	6	06	09		3,967	Retired; 6 March 1991
N/A (Navstar 7)	19 December 1981; 01:10	Atlas E/F	VAFB, SLC-3E	I	7	07	10		0	N/A
N/A (Navstar 7)	Failed to reach orbit.									
OPS 9794	14 July 1983; 10:21	Atlas E/F	VAFB, SLC-3W	I	8	08	11		3,583	Retired; 4 May 1993
USA-1	13 June 1984; 11:37	Atlas E/F	VAFB, SLC-3W	I	9	09	13		3,660	Retired; 20 June 1994
USA-1	Used for testing between February 1994 and June 1994.									
USA-5	8 September 1984; 21:41	Atlas E/F	VAFB, SLC-3W	I	10	10	12		4,207	Retired; 18 November 1995
USA-5	Used for testing between November 1995 and March 1996.									
USA-10	9 October 1985; 02:53	Atlas E/F	VAFB, SLC-3W	I	11	11	03		3,109	Retired; 13 April 1994
N/A (Prototype)				II	0	12			0	N/A
N/A (Prototype)	Qualification vehicle built by Rockwell International to secure Block II contract; never launched.									
USA-35	14 February 1989; 18:30	Delta II 6925-9.5	CCAFS, LC-17A	II	1	14	14		4,059	Retired; 26 March 2000
USA-38	10 June 1989; 22:30	Delta II 6925-9.5	CCAFS, LC-17A	II	2	13	02	B3	5,371	Retired; 22 February 2004
USA-42	18 August 1989; 05:58	Delta II 6925-9.5	CCAFS, LC-17A	II	3	16	16		4,075	Retired; 13 October 2000
USA-47	21 October 1989; 09:31	Delta II 6925-9.5	CCAFS, LC-17A	II	4	19	19	A5	4,165	Retired; 16 March 2001
USA-49	11 December 1989; 18:10	Delta II 6925-9.5	CCAFS, LC-17B	II	5	17	17	D3	5,554	Retired; 23 February 2005
USA-50	24 January 1990; 22:55	Delta II 6925-9.5	CCAFS, LC-17A	II	6	18	18		3,860	Retired; 18 August 2000
USA-54	26 March 1990; 02:45	Delta II 6925-9.5	CCAFS, LC-17A	II	7	20	20		2,249	Retired; 21 May 1996
USA-54	Decommissioned after twice changing frequency without being commanded to.									
USA-63	2 August 1990; 05:39	Delta II 6925-9.5	CCAFS, LC-17A	II	8	21	21	E2	4,438	Retired; 25 September 2002
USA-64	1 October 1990; 21:56	Delta II 6925-9.5	CCAFS, LC-17A	II	9	15	15	D5	6,009	Retired; 17 November 2006
USA-64	Used for testing from November 2006 until March 2007									
USA-66	26 November 1990; 21:39	Delta II 7925-9.5	CCAFS, LC-17A	IIA	1	23	23; 32	E5	7,720	Retired; 25 January 2016
USA-66	Decommissioned from active service using PRN23 on 13 February 2004. Set usable with PRN32 on 26 February 2008.									
USA-71	4 July 1991; 02:32	Delta II 7925-9.5	CCAFS, LC-17A	IIA	2	24	24	D1	7,394	Retired; 30 September 2011
USA-79	23 February 1992; 22:29	Delta II 7925-9.5	CCAFS, LC-17B	IIA	3	25	25	A2	6,509	Retired; 18 December 2009
USA-80	10 April 1992; 03:20	Delta II 7925-9.5	CCAFS, LC-17B	IIA	4	28	28	C2	1,954	Retired; 15 August 1997
USA-80	Retired early, replaced by USA-117.									
USA-83	7 July 1992; 09:20	Delta II 7925-9.5	CCAFS, LC-17B	IIA	5	26	26	F5	8,219	Retired; 6 January 2015
USA-84	9 September 1992; 08:57	Delta II 7925-9.5	CCAFS, LC-17A	IIA	6	27	27	A6	6,910	Retired; 10 August 2011
USA-85	22 November 1992; 23:54	Delta II 7925-9.5	CCAFS, LC-17A	IIA	7	32	31; 01; 30; NA	F4	5,595	Retired; 17 March 2008
USA-85	PRN changed from 32 to 01 in January 1993 due to receiver problems. Decommissioned 17 March 2008 and removed from slot F4. Briefly resumed L-band transmission in 2014 but signal unusable.									
USA-87	18 December 1992; 22:16	Delta II 7925-9.5	CCAFS, LC-17B	IIA	8	29	29	F5	5,423	Retired; 23 October 2007
USA-88	3 February 1993; 02:55	Delta II 7925-9.5	CCAFS, LC-17A	IIA	9	22	22	B1	3,591	Retired; 3 December 2002
USA-90	30 March 1993; 03:09	Delta II 7925-9.5	CCAFS, LC-17A	IIA	10	31	31	C3	4,592	Retired; 24 October 2005
USA-91	13 May 1993; 00:07	Delta II 7925-9.5	CCAFS, LC-17A	IIA	11	37	07; 01; 24	C4	8,346	Retired; 18 March 2016
USA-91	Switched to PRN01 in October 2008 but was unusable. Switched to PRN24 in April 2012 but was unusable.									
USA-92	26 June 1993; 13:27	Delta II 7925-9.5	CCAFS, LC-17A	IIA	12	39	09	A5	7,633	Retired; 19 May 2014
USA-92	First satellite to complete initial operational 24-satellite constellation.									
USA-94	30 August 1993; 12:38	Delta II 7925-9.5	CCAFS, LC-17B	IIA	13	35	05; 30	B5	6,313	Retired; 1 May 2013
USA-94	Decommissioned from active service using PRN05 in March 2009. Resumed activity using PRN30 in August 2011.									
USA-96	26 October 1993; 17:04	Delta II 7925-9.5	CCAFS, LC-17B	IIA	14	34	04; 18	D6	8,612	Retired; 9 October 2019
USA-96	Decommissioned from active service using PRN04 in November 2015. Reactivated in March 2018 using PRN18. Decommissioned from active service using PRN18 in October 2019.									
USA-100	10 March 1994; 03:40	Delta II 7925-9.5	CCAFS, LC-17A	IIA	15	36	06; 04	C6	7,289	Retired; 21 February 2014
USA-117	28 March 1996; 00:21	Delta II 7925-9.5	CCAFS, LC-17B	IIA	16	33	03	C5	6,702	Retired; 2 August 2014
USA-126	16 July 1996; 00:50	Delta II 7925-9.5	CCAFS, LC-17A	IIA	17	40	10	E6	7,179	Retired; 11 March 2016
USA-128	12 September 1996; 08:49	Delta II 7925-9.5	CCAFS, LC-17A	IIA	18	30	30	B2	5,425	Retired; 20 July 2011
GPS IIR-1	17 January 1997; 16:28	Delta II 7925-9.5	CCAFS, LC-17A	IIR	1	42	12		0	N/A
GPS IIR-1	Failed to reach orbit.									
USA-132	23 July 1997; 03:43	Delta II 7925-9.5	CCAFS, LC-17A	IIR	2	43	13	F6	10,503	On orbit spare 24 April 2026
USA-132	Longest-serving satellite in GPS history.									
USA-135	6 November 1997; 00:30	Delta II 7925-9.5	CCAFS, LC-17A	IIA	19	38	08	A3	8,008	Retired; 9 October 2019
USA-145	7 October 1999; 12:51	Delta II 7925-9.5	CCAFS, SLC-17A	IIR	3	46	11	D5	7,706	On orbit spare 10 November 2020
USA-150	11 May 2000; 01:48	Delta II 7925-9.5	CCAFS, SLC-17A	IIR	4	51	20	E4	9,318	On orbit spare 8 January 2026
USA-151	16 July 2000; 09:17	Delta II 7925-9.5	CCAFS, SLC-17A	IIR	5	44	28; 22	B3	9,586	Operational
USA-154	10 November 2000; 17:14	Delta II 7925-9.5	CCAFS, SLC-17A	IIR	6	41	14; 22	F5	7,553	On orbit spare 25 January 2023
USA-154	Retired 9 July 2020. Subsequently reactivated on 20 January 2022 and decommissioned again on 25 January 2023.									
USA-156	30 January 2001; 07:55	Delta II 7925-9.5	CCAFS, SLC-17A	IIR	7	54	18	E4	6,244	Retired; 5 March 2018
USA-166	29 January 2003; 18:06	Delta II 7925-9.5	CCAFS, SLC-17B	IIR	8	56	16	B1	8,659	Operational
USA-168	31 March 2003; 22:09	Delta II 7925-9.5	CCAFS, SLC-17A	IIR	9	45	21	D3	7,974	Retired; 27 January 2025
USA-175	21 December 2003; 08:05	Delta II 7925-9.5	CCAFS, SLC-17A	IIR	10	47	22	E6	6,604	Retired; 18 January 2022
USA-177	20 March 2004; 17:53	Delta II 7925-9.5	CCAFS, SLC-17B	IIR	11	59	19	C5	8,243	Operational
USA-178	23 June 2004; 22:54	Delta II 7925-9.5	CCAFS, SLC-17B	IIR	12	60	23	F4	5,732	On orbit spare 2 March 2020
USA-180	6 November 2004; 05:39	Delta II 7925-9.5	CCAFS, SLC-17B	IIR	13	61	02	D1	8,012	Operational
USA-183	26 September 2005; 03:37	Delta II 7925-9.5	CCAFS, SLC-17A	IIRM	1	53	17	C4	7,688	Operational
USA-183	Also known as IIR-14; first to broadcast L2C signal.									
USA-190	25 September 2006; 18:50	Delta II 7925-9.5	CCAFS, SLC-17A	IIRM	2	52	31	A2	7,324	Operational
USA-190	Also known as IIR-15.									
USA-192	17 November 2006; 19:12	Delta II 7925-9.5	CCAFS, SLC-17A	IIRM	3	58	12	B4	7,271	Operational
USA-192	Also known as IIR-16; first satellite to complete the full operational 31-satellite constellation.									
USA-196	17 October 2007; 12:23	Delta II 7925-9.5	CCAFS, SLC-17A	IIRM	4	55	15	F2	6,937	Operational
USA-196	Also known as IIR-17.									
USA-199	20 December 2007; 20:04	Delta II 7925-9.5	CCAFS, SLC-17A	IIRM	5	57	29	C1	6,873	Operational
USA-199	Also known as IIR-18.									
USA-201	15 March 2008; 06:10	Delta II 7925-9.5	CCAFS, SLC-17A	IIRM	6	48	07	A4	6,787	Operational
USA-201	Also known as IIR-19.									
USA-203	24 March 2009; 08:34	Delta II 7925-9.5	CCAFS, SLC-17A	IIRM	7	49	01; 27; 30; 06; NA	B6	814	In Reserve
USA-203	Also known as IIR-20; broadcasts demonstration L5 signal. Never entered service due to poor quality signal; decommissioned on 6 May 2011 but subsequently reactivated for testing. Broadcast PRN-01 before decommissioning, PRN-27 after reactivation. Shifted to PRN-30 as of 8 May 2013 and to PRN-06 as of 3 April 2014. Currently not assigned a PRN.									
USA-206	17 August 2009; 10:35	Delta II 7925-9.5	CCAFS, SLC-17A	IIRM	8	50	05	E3	6,267	Operational
USA-206	Originally scheduled for launch in 1999 as IIR-3 but damaged during processing. Also known as IIR-21; L5 services disconnected from J2 port before launch. Final Delta II launch with a United States Air Force payload, final launch from SLC-17A, and final Delta II 7925.									
USA-213	28 May 2010; 03:00	Delta IV M+ (4,2)	CCAFS, SLC-37B	IIF	1	62	25	B2	5,983	Operational
USA-213	First to broadcast operational L5 signal.									
USA-232	16 July 2011; 06:41	Delta IV M+(4,2)	CCAFS, SLC-37B	IIF	2	63	01	D2	4,409	On orbit spare 10 August 2023
USA-239	4 October 2012; 12:10	Delta IV M+(4,2)	CCAFS, SLC-37B	IIF	3	65	24	A1	5,123	Operational
USA-242	15 May 2013; 21:38	Atlas V 401	CCAFS, SLC-41	IIF	4	66	27	C2	4,900	Operational
USA-248	21 February 2014; 01:59	Delta IV M+ (4,2)	CCAFS, SLC-37B	IIF	5	64	30	A3	4,618	Operational
USA-251	17 May 2014; 00:03	Delta IV M+ (4,2)	CCAFS, SLC-37B	IIF	6	67	06	D4	4,533	Operational
USA-256	2 August 2014; 03:23	Atlas V 401	CCAFS, SLC-41	IIF	7	68	09	F3	4,456	Operational
USA-258	29 October 2014; 17:21	Atlas V 401	CCAFS, SLC-41	IIF	8	69	03	E1	4,368	Operational
USA-260	25 March 2015; 18:36	Delta IV M+ (4,2)	CCAFS, SLC-37B	IIF	9	71	26	B5	4,221	Operational
USA-262	15 July 2015; 15:36	Atlas V 401	CCAFS, SLC-41	IIF	10	72	08	C3	4,109	Operational
USA-265	31 October 2015; 16:13	Atlas V 401	CCAFS, SLC-41	IIF	11	73	10	E2	4,001	Operational
USA-266	5 February 2016; 13:38	Atlas V 401	CCAFS, SLC-41	IIF	12	70	32	F1	3,904	Operational
USA-289; Vespucci	23 December 2018; 13:51	Falcon 9 Block 5	CCAFS, SLC-40	III	1	74	04	F4	2,852	Operational
USA-293; Magellan	22 August 2019; 13:06	Delta IV M+ (4,2)	CCAFS, SLC-37B	III	2	75	18	D6	2,610	Operational
USA-304; Matthew Henson	30 June 2020; 20:10:46	Falcon 9 Block 5	CCAFS, SLC-40	III	3	76	23	E5	2,297	Operational
USA-304; Matthew Henson	Initially nicknamed Columbus.									
USA-309; Sacagawea	5 November 2020; 23:24:23	Falcon 9 Block 5	CCAFS, SLC-40	III	4	77	14	B6	2,169	Operational
USA-319; Neil Armstrong	17 June 2021 16:09	Falcon 9 Block 5	CCSFS, SLC-40	III	5	78	11	D5	1,945	Operational
USA-343; Amelia Earhart	18 January 2023 12:24	Falcon 9 Block 5	CCSFS, SLC-40	III	6	79	28	A6	1,365	Operational
USA-440; Sally Ride	17 December 2024 00:52	Falcon 9 Block 5	CCSFS, SLC-40	III	7	80	01	D2	666	Operational
USA-440; Sally Ride	Originally contracted for launch on United Launch Alliance's Vulcan rocket; re-assigned to a Falcon 9 launch under the name Rapid Response Trailblazer-1 (RRT-1) within 6 months of launch due to Vulcan's unavailability and to demonstrate United States Space Force's ability to undergo responsive satellite mission planning.									
USA-545; Katherine Johnson	30 May 2025; 17:37	Falcon 9 Block 5	CCSFS, SLC-40	III	8	81	21	E6	502	Operational
USA-581; Ellison Onizuka	28 January 2026 04:53	Falcon 9 Block 5	CCSFS, SLC-40	III	9	82	20	F5	259	Operational
USA-585; Hedy Lamarr	21 April 2026; 06:53	Falcon 9 Block 5	CCSFS, SLC-40	III	10	83	13	B7	176	Operational

=== Satellites by block ===
Block	Launched	Launch Failures	Testing/ Reserve	Operational	Retired	Manufacturer	Remarks
Block I	11	1	0	0	10	Rockwell International	
Block II	9	0	0	0	9	Rockwell International	One unlaunched prototype
Block IIA	19	0	0	0	19	Rockwell International	
Block IIR	13	1	5	4	3	Lockheed Martin	
Block IIRM	8	0	1	7	0	Lockheed Martin	
Block IIF	12	0	1	11	0	Boeing	
Block III	10	0	0	10	0	Lockheed Martin	
Block IIIF	0	0	0	0	0	Lockheed Martin	
Total	82	2	7	32	41		
As of 3 September 2026

=== Orbital slots (by SVN) ===
Refer to GPS Constellation Status for the most up-to-date information.

As of 24 April 2026
Slot	Plane					
Slot	A	B	C	D	E	F
1	65	56	57	61	69	70
2	52	62	66	80	73	55
3	64	44	72		50	68
4	48	58	53	67		74
5	83	71	59	78	76	82
6	79	77		75	81	

Block	IIR	IIRM	IIF	III

Numbers in parentheses refer to non-operational satellites.

Once launched, GPS satellites do not change their plane assignment but slot assignments are somewhat arbitrary and are subject to change.

=== PRN status by satellite block ===
As of 2 September 2026, 32 of 32 PRNs are in use. Seven additional satellites are designated as on-orbit spares.

PRN	01	02	03	04	05	06	07	08	09	10	11	12	13	14	15	16	17	18	19	20	21	22	23	24	25	26	27	28	29	30	31	32	--
IIR		O									S		S			O			O	S		O											
IIRM					O		O					O			O		O												O		O		S
IIF	S		O			O		O	O	O														O	O	O	O			O		O	
III	O			O							O		O	O				O		O	O		O					O					

Legend:
- O – Operational
- T – Testing in preparation for operation
- S – On orbit Spare
- U – Unhealthy and unusable
- R – Retired

=== PRN to SVN history ===
This section is for the purpose of making it possible to determine the PRN associated with a SVN at a particular epoch. For example, SVN 049 had been assigned PRNs 01, 24, 27, and 30 at different times of its lifespan, whereas PRN 01 had been assigned to SVNs 032, 037, 049, 035, and 063 at different epochs. This information can be found in the IGS ANTEX file, which uses the convention "GNN" and "GNNN" for PRNs and SVNs, respectively. For example, SVN 049 is described as:

BLOCK IIR-M         G01                 G049      2009-014A TYPE / SERIAL NO    
  2009     3    24     0     0    0.0000000                 VALID FROM          
  2011     5     6    23    59   59.9999999                 VALID UNTIL         
BLOCK IIR-M         G24                 G049      2009-014A TYPE / SERIAL NO    
  2012     2     2     0     0    0.0000000                 VALID FROM          
  2012     3    14    23    59   59.9999999                 VALID UNTIL         
BLOCK IIR-M         G24                 G049      2009-014A TYPE / SERIAL NO    
  2012     8     9     0     0    0.0000000                 VALID FROM          
  2012     8    22    23    59   59.9999999                 VALID UNTIL         
BLOCK IIR-M         G27                 G049      2009-014A TYPE / SERIAL NO    
  2012    10    18     0     0    0.0000000                 VALID FROM          
  2013     5     9    23    59   59.9999999                 VALID UNTIL         
BLOCK IIR-M         G30                 G049      2009-014A TYPE / SERIAL NO    
  2013     5    10     0     0    0.0000000                 VALID FROM          

whereas for PRN 01 the following excerpt is relevant:

BLOCK IIA           G01                 G032      1992-079A TYPE / SERIAL NO    
  1992    11    22     0     0    0.0000000                 VALID FROM          
  2008    10    16    23    59   59.9999999                 VALID UNTIL         
BLOCK IIA           G01                 G037      1993-032A TYPE / SERIAL NO    
  2008    10    23     0     0    0.0000000                 VALID FROM          
  2009     1     6    23    59   59.9999999                 VALID UNTIL         
BLOCK IIR-M         G01                 G049      2009-014A TYPE / SERIAL NO    
  2009     3    24     0     0    0.0000000                 VALID FROM          
  2011     5     6    23    59   59.9999999                 VALID UNTIL         
BLOCK IIA           G01                 G035      1993-054A TYPE / SERIAL NO    
  2011     6     2     0     0    0.0000000                 VALID FROM          
  2011     7    12    23    59   59.9999999                 VALID UNTIL         
BLOCK IIF           G01                 G063      2011-036A TYPE / SERIAL NO    
  2011     7    16     0     0    0.0000000                 VALID FROM          

A table extracted out of the ANTEX file is made available by the Bernese GNSS Software.

== Planned launches ==
=== Block IIIF ===
The first GPS Block IIIF satellite is planned to launch in Q3 2028. SV numbers are continued from GPS III SVs. SVNs are consistent with previous GPS satellites.

GPS Block IIIF satellites
Satellite	SVN	Launch Date (UTC)	Rocket	Launch site	Status	Remarks
GPS IIIF-1; SV11	84	Q3 2028	Vulcan Centaur VC2S	Cape Canaveral, SLC‑41	Production	Core mate Feb 2025.AFL target Q3 2027.
GPS IIIF-2; SV12 (USSF-49)	85	Q2 2029	Vulcan Centaur VC2S	Cape Canaveral, SLC‑41	Production	
GPS IIIF-3; SV13 (USSF-15)	86		Vulcan Centaur VC4S	Cape Canaveral, SLC‑41	Production	First to use LM2100 Combat Bus. Core mate April 2025
GPS IIIF-4; SV14 (USSF-88)	87		Vulcan Centaur VC4S	Cape Canaveral, SLC‑41	Production	
GPS IIIF-5; SV15	88				Production	
GPS IIIF-6; SV16	89				Production	
GPS IIIF-7; SV17	90				Production	
GPS IIIF-8; SV18	91				Production	
GPS IIIF-9; SV19	92				Production	
GPS IIIF-10; SV20	93				Production	
GPS IIIF-11; SV21	94				Ordered	
GPS IIIF-12; SV22	95				Ordered	
GPS IIIF-13; SV23	96				Ordered	
GPS IIIF‑14; SV24	97				Ordered	

== See also ==
- List of Wide Area Augmentation System (WAAS) satellites
- List of BeiDou satellites
- List of Galileo satellites
- List of GLONASS satellites
- List of NAVIC satellites
