= USA-145 =

American navigation satellite used for GPS

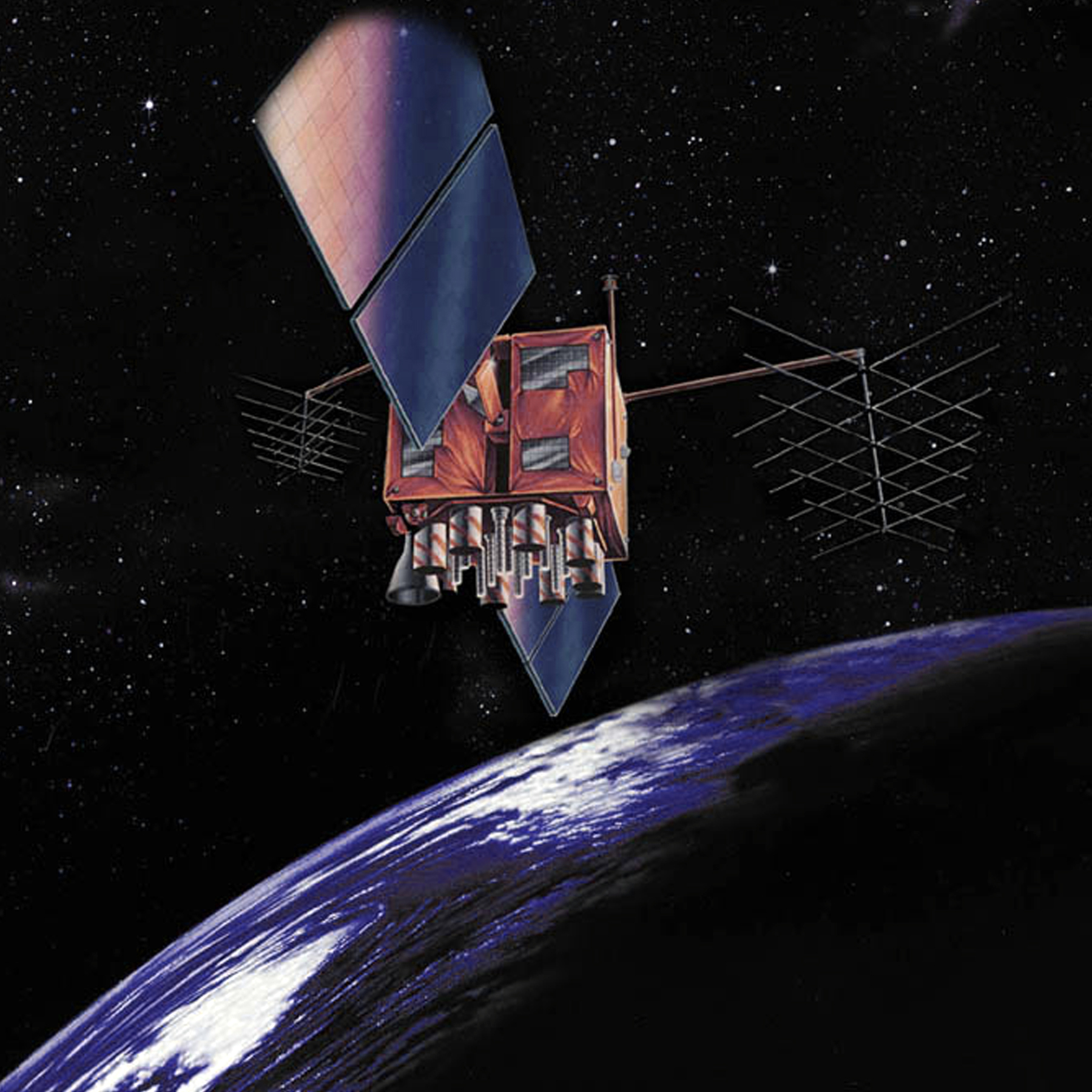
- A Block IIR GPS satellite
- Mission type: Navigation
- Operator: US Air Force
- COSPAR ID: 1999-055A
- SATCAT no.: 25933
- Mission duration: 10 years (planned)

Spacecraft properties
- Spacecraft type: GPS Block IIR
- Bus: AS-4000
- Manufacturer: Lockheed Martin
- Launch mass: 2,032 kilograms (4,480 lb)

Start of mission
- Launch date: 7 October 1999, 12:51:01 UTC
- Rocket: Delta II 7925-9.5, D275
- Launch site: Cape Canaveral SLC-17A

Orbital parameters
- Reference system: Geocentric
- Regime: Medium Earth (Semi-synchronous)
- Perigee altitude: 20,096 kilometers (12,487 mi)
- Apogee altitude: 20,267 kilometers (12,593 mi)
- Inclination: 53 degrees
- Period: 717.96 minutes

USA-145, also known as GPS IIR-3 and GPS SVN-46, is an American navigation satellite which forms part of the Global Positioning System. It was the third Block IIR GPS satellite to be launched, out of thirteen in the original configuration, and twenty one overall. It was built by Lockheed Martin, using the AS-4000 satellite bus.

USA-145 was launched at 12:51:01 UTC on 7 October 1999, atop a Delta II carrier rocket, flight number D275, flying in the 7925-9.5 configuration. The launch took place from Space Launch Complex 17A at the Cape Canaveral Air Force Station, and placed USA-145 into a transfer orbit. The satellite raised itself into medium Earth orbit using a Star-37FM apogee motor.

By 10 November 1999, USA-145 was in an orbit with a perigee of 20,096 kilometers (12,487 mi), an apogee of 20,267 kilometers (12,593 mi), a period of 717.96 minutes, and 53 degrees of inclination to the equator. It is used to broadcast the PRN 11 signal, and operated in slot 2 of plane D of the GPS constellation; however, it had been moved to slot 5 by 2011, with USA-71 covering slot 2. The satellite has a mass of 2,032 kilograms (4,480 lb), and a design life of 10 years. As of 2019 it remains in service.

GPS IIR-3 was originally intended to use satellite SVN-50; however, it was damaged during launch preparations in May 1999 after rainwater leaked into the cleanroom atop SLC-17A where the satellite was being attached to its rocket. SVN-50 was repaired and launched as GPS IIR-21, becoming the last IIR to fly.
