= USA-319 =

GPS III satellite

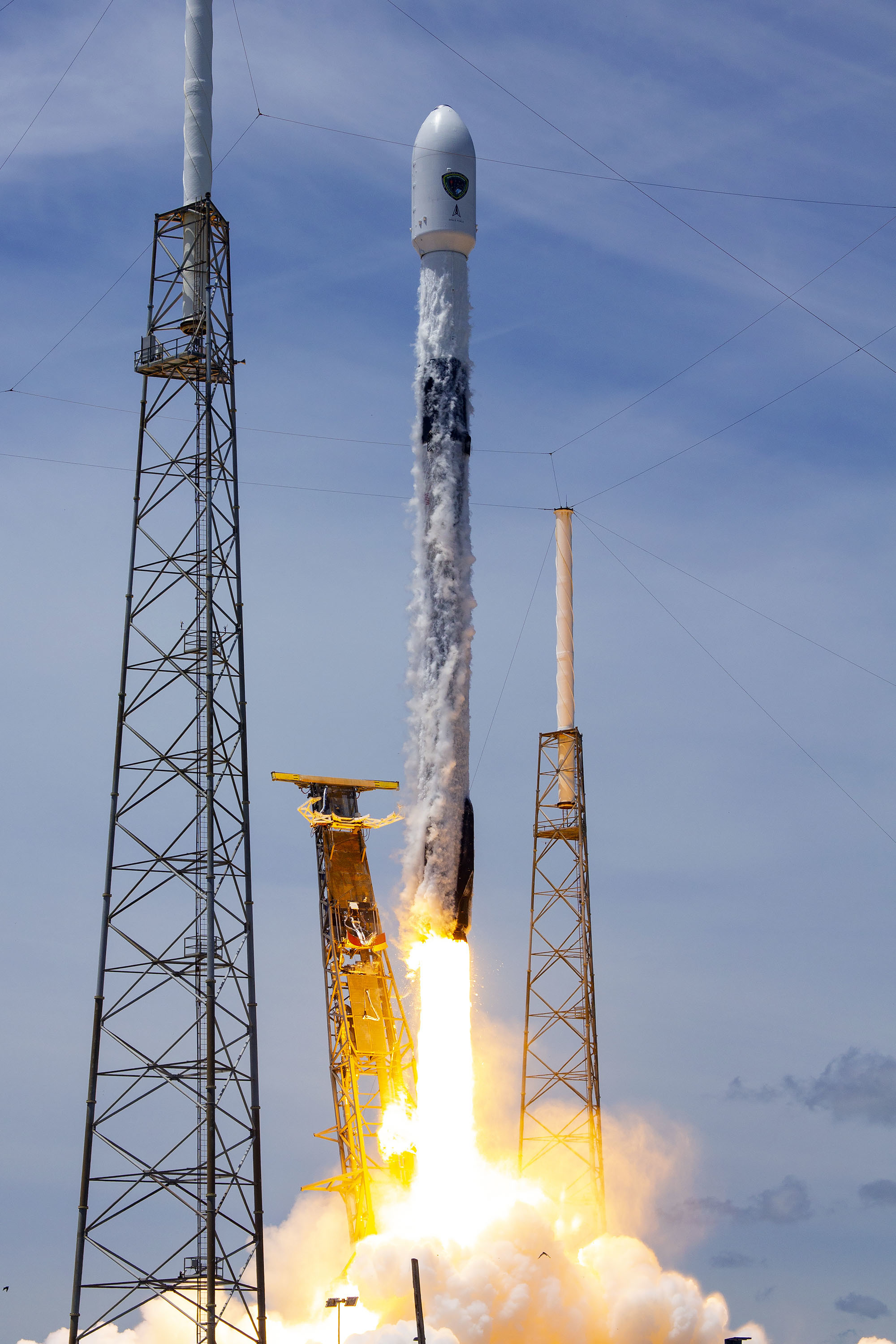
- Launch of GPS-III 05
- Names: Navstar 81; GPS-III SV05; Neil Armstrong
- Mission type: Navigation
- Operator: USSF
- COSPAR ID: 2021-054A
- SATCAT no.: 48859
- Mission duration: 15 years (planned)

Spacecraft properties
- Spacecraft: GPS-III SV05
- Spacecraft type: GPS Block III
- Bus: A2100M
- Manufacturer: Lockheed Martin
- Launch mass: 4331 kg
- Power: watts

Start of mission
- Launch date: 17 June 2021, 16:09 UTC
- Rocket: Falcon 9 Block 5 (F9-122)
- Launch site: Cape Canaveral, SLC-40
- Contractor: SpaceX

Orbital parameters
- Reference system: Geocentric orbit
- Regime: Medium Earth orbit (Semi-synchronous orbit)
- Perigee altitude: 20,163 km (12,529 mi)
- Apogee altitude: 20,216 km (12,562 mi)
- Inclination: 55.3°
- Period: 718.0 minutes

USA-319, also known as GPS-III SV05, NAVSTAR 81 or Neil Armstrong, is a United States navigation satellite which forms part of the Global Positioning System. It was the fifth GPS Block III satellite to be launched.

== Satellite ==
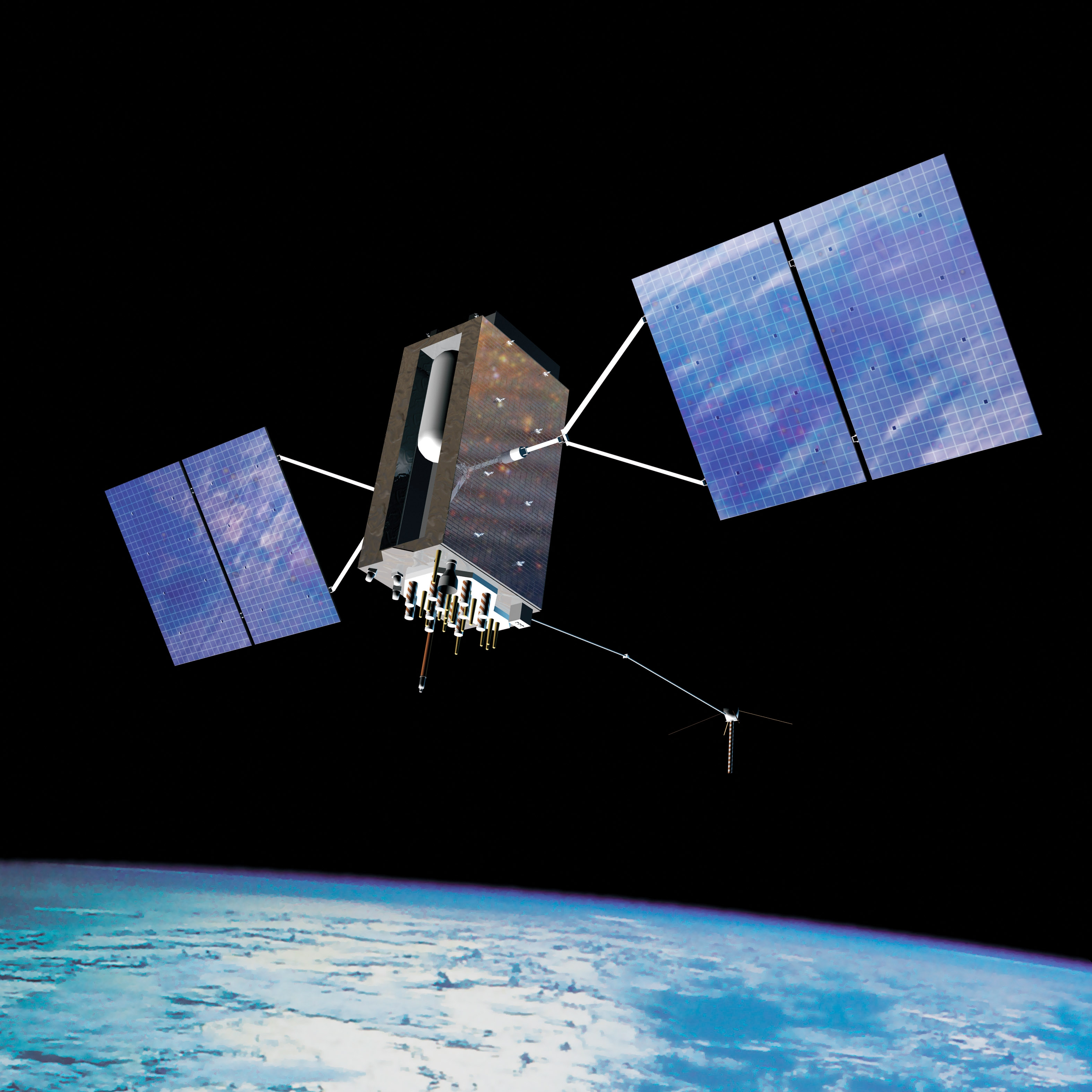
Artist's rendering of GPS-III satellite in orbit

SV05 is the fifth GPS Block III satellite. Satellite construction was completed in early 2021.

The spacecraft is built on the Lockheed Martin A2100 satellite bus, and weighs approximately 4,331 kg (9,548 lb).

SV05 is the 24th operational Military Code (M-Code) satellite to join the GPS constellation, the last required for M-Code Full Operational Capability.

== Launch ==
USA-319 was launched by SpaceX on 17 June 2021 at 16:09 UTC, atop Falcon 9 booster B1062. This booster had previously launched SV04 a year prior.

The launch took place from SLC-40 at Cape Canaveral Space Force Station, and placed USA-319 directly into semi-synchronous orbit. About eight minutes after launch, Falcon 9 successfully landed on the droneship Just Read the Instructions.

== Orbit ==
As of 2023, USA-319 was in a 55.3 degree inclination orbit with a perigee of 20,163 kilometers (12,529 mi) and an apogee of 20,216 km (12,562 mi).
