= Navstar 7 =

Failed American navigation satellite

- Names: GPS I-7; GPS SVN-7
- Mission type: Navigation; Technology
- Operator: U.S. Air Force
- Mission duration: 5 years (planned); Launch failure

Spacecraft properties
- Spacecraft: Navstar
- Spacecraft type: GPS Block I
- Manufacturer: Rockwell Space Systems
- Launch mass: 758 kg (1,671 lb)
- Dimensions: 5.3 meters of long
- Power: 400 watts

Start of mission
- Launch date: 19 December 1981, 01:10:00 UTC
- Rocket: Atlas E / SGS-1 (Atlas-76E)
- Launch site: Vandenberg, SLC-3E
- Contractor: Convair; General Dynamics
- Entered service: Launch failure

Orbital parameters
- Reference system: Geocentric orbit (planned)
- Regime: Medium Earth orbit (Semi-synchronous)
- Altitude: 20,200 km
- Inclination: 63.0°
- Period: 720 minutes

Navstar 7, also known as GPS I-7 and GPS SVN-7, was an American navigation satellite which was lost in a launch failure in 1981. It was intended to be used in the Global Positioning System development program. It was the seventh of eleven Block I GPS satellites to be launched, and the only one to fail to achieve orbit.

== Background ==
Global Positioning System (GPS) was developed by the U.S. Department of Defense to provide all-weather round-the-clock navigation capabilities for military ground, sea, and air forces. Since its implementation, GPS has also become an integral asset in numerous civilian applications and industries around the globe, including recreational used (e.g., boating, aircraft, hiking), corporate vehicle fleet tracking, and surveying. GPS employs 24 spacecraft in 20,200 km circular orbits inclined at 55°. These vehicles are placed in 6 orbit planes with four operational satellites in each plane.

== Spacecraft ==
The first eleven spacecraft (GPS Block 1) were used to demonstrate the feasibility of the GPS system. They were 3-axis stabilized, nadir pointing using reaction wheels. Dual solar arrays supplied over 400 watts. They had S-band communications for control and telemetry and Ultra high frequency (UHF) cross-link between spacecraft. They were manufactured by Rockwell Space Systems, were 5.3 meters across with solar panels deployed, and had a design life expectancy of 5 years. Unlike the later operational satellites, GPS Block 1 spacecraft were inclined at 63°.

== Launch ==
Navstar 7 was launched at 01:10 UTC on 19 December 1981, atop an Atlas E launch vehicle with an SGS-1 upper stage. The Atlas used had the serial number 76E, and was originally built as an Atlas E. The launch took place from Space Launch Complex 3E at Vandenberg Air Force Base.

During preparations for launch, a seal on the number B2 engine of the MA-3 booster section of the Atlas was replaced. Sealant from this seeped into three coolant holes, plugging them. Four seconds after liftoff, the engine overheated and burned through its gas generator, severing an oxidiser line. Within seven and a half seconds of launch, the engine lost thrust, causing the rocket to pitch out of control. It was destroyed by range safety officer, with debris landing within 150 m (490 ft) of the launch pad, less than twenty seconds after liftoff.

== Mission ==
If the launch had been successful, it would have placed Navstar 7 into a transfer orbit, from which the satellite would have raised itself into medium Earth orbit by means of a Star-27 apogee motor. The spacecraft had a design life of 5 years and a mass of 758 kg (1,671 lb).
