= USA-343 =

GPS III satellite

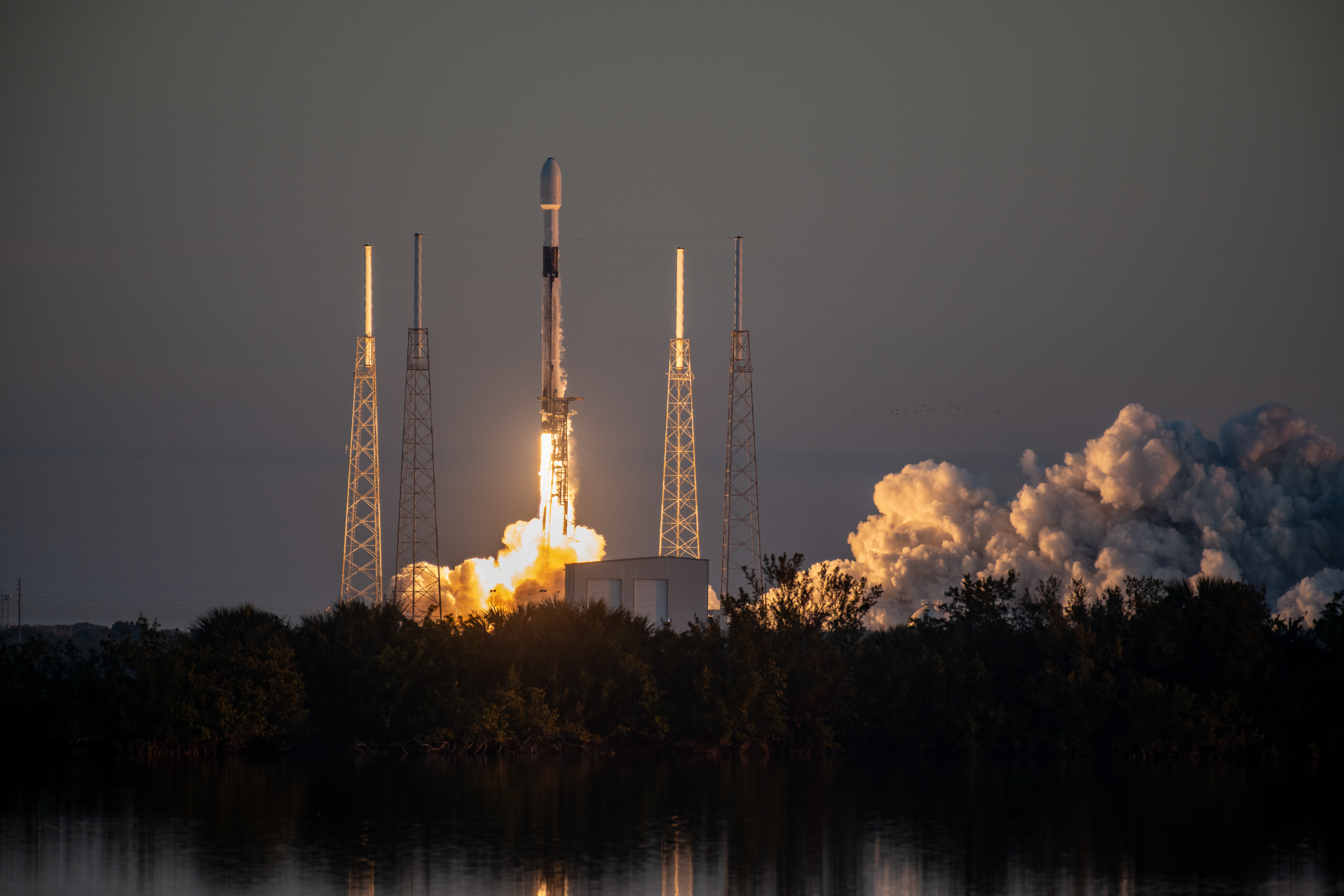
- Launch of GPS-III 06
- Names: Navstar 82; GPS-III SV06; Amelia Earhart
- Mission type: Navigation
- Operator: USSF
- COSPAR ID: 2023-009A
- SATCAT no.: 55268
- Mission duration: 15 years (planned)

Spacecraft properties
- Spacecraft: GPS-III SV06
- Spacecraft type: GPS Block III
- Bus: A2100M
- Manufacturer: Lockheed Martin
- Launch mass: 4352 kg
- Power: 70/28 Volts

Start of mission
- Launch date: 18 January 2023, 12:24 UTC
- Rocket: Falcon 9 Block 5 (F9-197)
- Launch site: Cape Canaveral, SLC-40
- Contractor: SpaceX

Orbital parameters
- Reference system: Geocentric orbit
- Regime: Medium Earth orbit (Semi-synchronous orbit)
- Perigee altitude: 20,178 km (12,538 mi)
- Apogee altitude: 20,200 km (12,600 mi)
- Inclination: 55.1°
- Period: 718.0 minutes

USA-343, also known as GPS-III SV06, NAVSTAR 82 or Amelia Earhart, is a United States navigation satellite which forms part of the Global Positioning System. It was the sixth GPS Block III satellite to be launched.

== Satellite ==
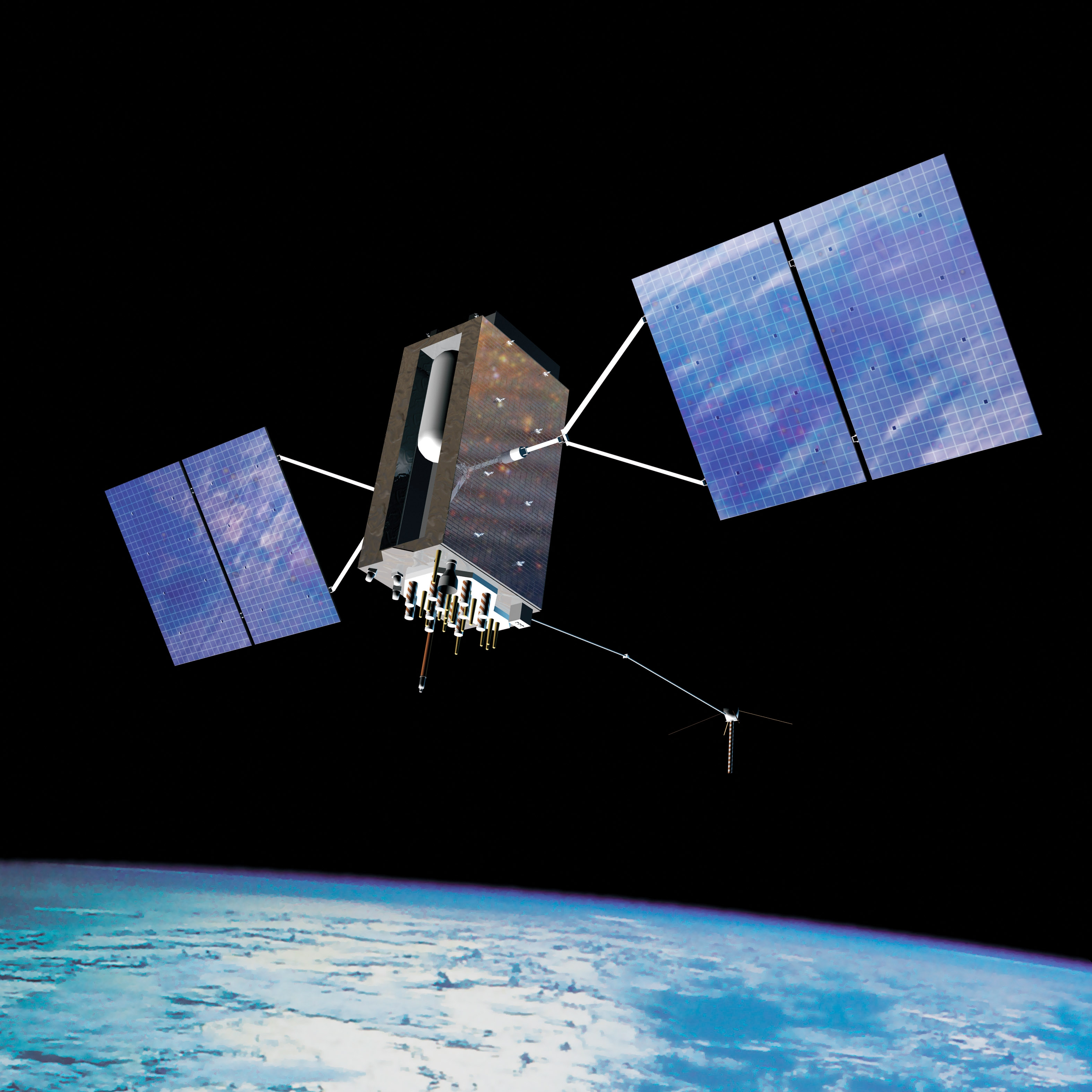
Artist's rendering of GPS-III satellite in orbit

SV06 is the sixth GPS Block III satellite. It was declared operational on 31 January 2023.

The spacecraft is built on the Lockheed Martin A2100 satellite bus, and weighs approximately 4,352 kg (9,595 lb).

== Launch ==
USA-343 was launched by SpaceX on 18 January 2023 at 12:24 UTC, atop Falcon 9 booster B1077.

The launch took place from SLC-40 at Cape Canaveral Space Force Station, and placed USA-343 directly into semi-synchronous orbit. About eight minutes after launch, Falcon 9 successfully landed on the droneship A Shortfall of Gravitas.

== Orbit ==
As of 2023, USA-343 was in a 55.1 degree inclination orbit with a perigee of 20,178 kilometers (12,538 mi) and an apogee of 20,200 km (12,600 mi).
