= USA-201 =

American navigation satellite used for GPS

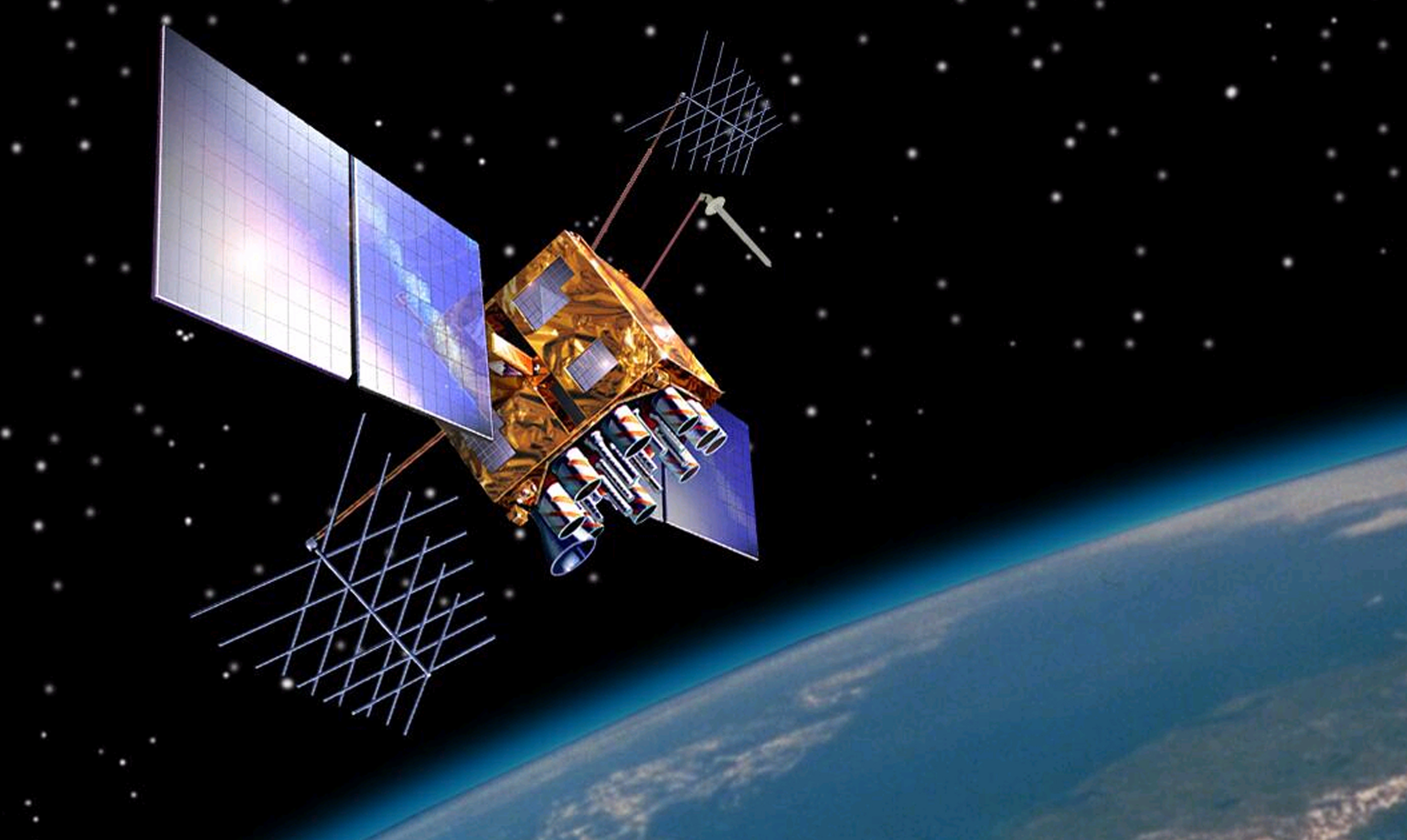
- A Block IIRM GPS satellite
- Mission type: Navigation
- Operator: US Air Force
- COSPAR ID: 2008-012A
- SATCAT no.: 32711
- Mission duration: 10 years (planned)

Spacecraft properties
- Spacecraft type: GPS Block IIRM
- Bus: AS-4000
- Manufacturer: Lockheed Martin
- Launch mass: 2,032 kilograms (4,480 lb)

Start of mission
- Launch date: 15 March 2008, 06:10 UTC
- Rocket: Delta II 7925-9.5, D332
- Launch site: Cape Canaveral SLC-17A

Orbital parameters
- Reference system: Geocentric
- Regime: Medium Earth (Semi-synchronous)
- Perigee altitude: 20,143 kilometers (12,516 mi)
- Apogee altitude: 20,222 kilometers (12,565 mi)
- Inclination: 55.1 degrees
- Period: 717.98 minutes

USA-201, also known as GPS IIR-19(M), GPS IIRM-6 and GPS SVN-48, is an American navigation satellite which forms part of the Global Positioning System. It was the sixth of eight Block IIRM satellites to be launched, and the nineteenth of twenty one Block IIR satellites overall. It was built by Lockheed Martin, using the AS-4000 satellite bus.

USA-201 was launched at 06:10 UTC on 15 March 2008, atop a Delta II carrier rocket, flight number D332, flying in the 7925–9.5 configuration. The launch took place from Space Launch Complex 17A at the Cape Canaveral Air Force Station, and placed USA-201 into a transfer orbit. The satellite raised itself into medium Earth orbit using a Star-37FM apogee motor.

By 18 May 2008, USA-201 was in an orbit with a perigee of 20,143 kilometers (12,516 mi), an apogee of 20,222 kilometers (12,565 mi), a period of 717.98 minutes, and 55.1 degrees of inclination to the equator. It is used to broadcast the PRN 07 signal, and operates in slot 4 of plane A of the GPS constellation. The satellite has a design life of 10 years and a mass of 2,032 kilograms (4,480 lb). As of 2012 it remains in service.
