= USA-199 =

American navigation satellite used for GPS

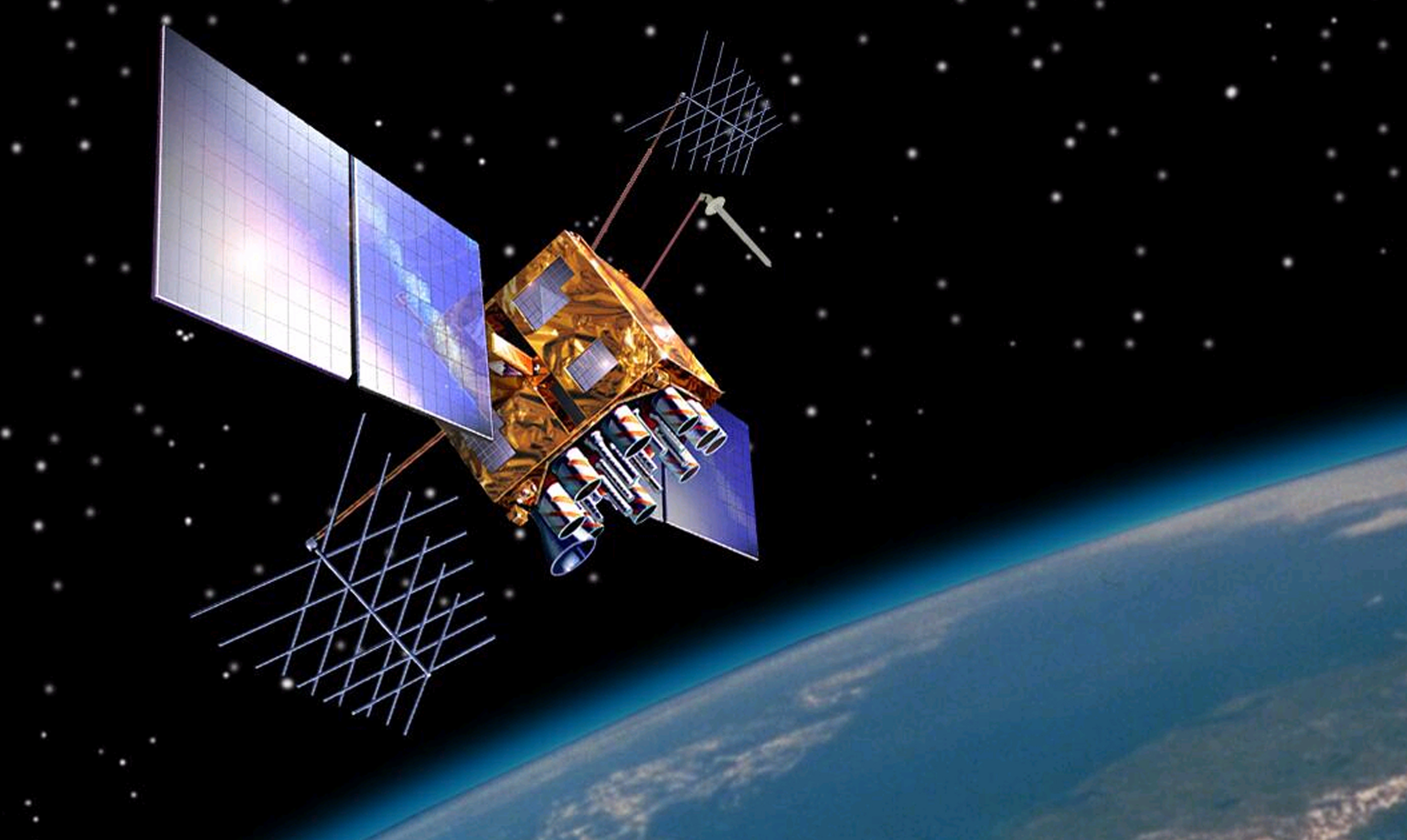
- A Block IIRM GPS satellite
- Mission type: Navigation
- Operator: US Air Force
- COSPAR ID: 2007-062A
- SATCAT no.: 32384
- Mission duration: 10 years (planned)

Spacecraft properties
- Spacecraft type: GPS Block IIRM
- Bus: AS-4000
- Manufacturer: Lockheed Martin
- Launch mass: 2,032 kilograms (4,480 lb)

Start of mission
- Launch date: 20 December 2007, 20:04:00 UTC
- Rocket: Delta II 7925-9.5, D331
- Launch site: Cape Canaveral SLC-17A

Orbital parameters
- Reference system: Geocentric
- Regime: Medium Earth (Semi-synchronous)
- Perigee altitude: 20,082 kilometers (12,478 mi)
- Apogee altitude: 20,283 kilometers (12,603 mi)
- Inclination: 54.9 degrees
- Period: 717.98 minutes

USA-199, also known as GPS IIR-18(M), GPS IIRM-5, and GPS SVN-57, is an American navigation satellite which forms part of the Global Positioning System. It was the fifth of eight Block IIRM satellites to be launched, and the eighteenth of twenty one Block IIR satellites overall. It was built by Lockheed Martin, using the AS-4000 satellite bus.

USA-199 was launched at 20:04:00 UTC on 20 December 2007, atop a Delta II carrier rocket, flight number D331, flying in the 7925-9.5 configuration. The launch took place from Space Launch Complex 17A at Cape Canaveral Air Force Station, and placed USA-199 into a transfer orbit. The satellite subsequently raised itself into medium Earth orbit using a Star-37FM apogee motor.

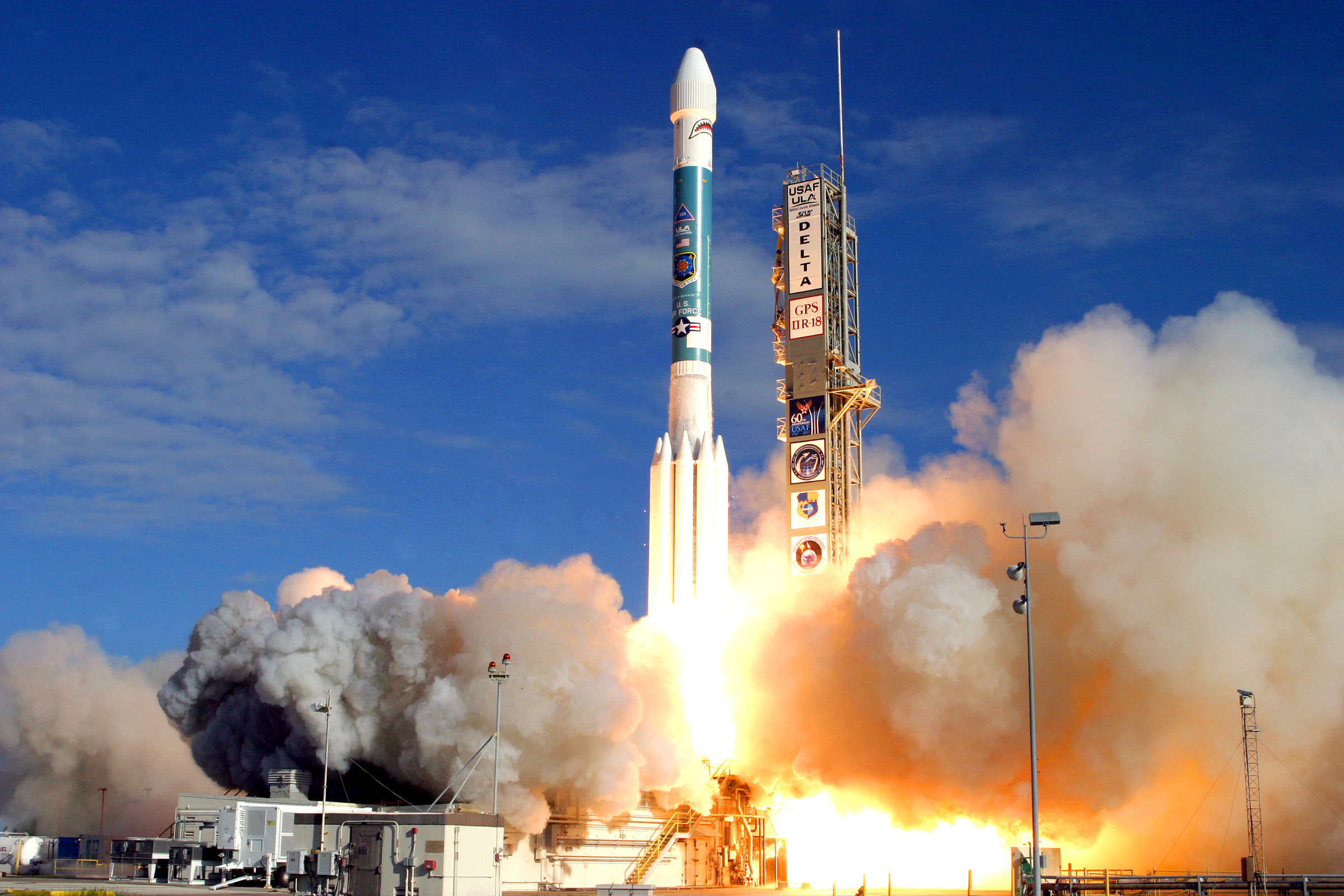
Launch of USA-199

By 15 February 2008, USA-199 was in an orbit with a perigee of 20,082 kilometers (12,478 mi), an apogee of 20,283 kilometers (12,603 mi), a period of 717.98 minutes, and an inclination of 54.9 degrees to the equator. It is used to broadcast the PRN 29 signal and operates in slot 1 of plane C of the GPS constellation. The satellite has a design life of 10 years and a mass of 2,032 kilograms (4,480 lb). As of 2012, USA-199 remained in service.
