= USA-581 =

GPS III satellite

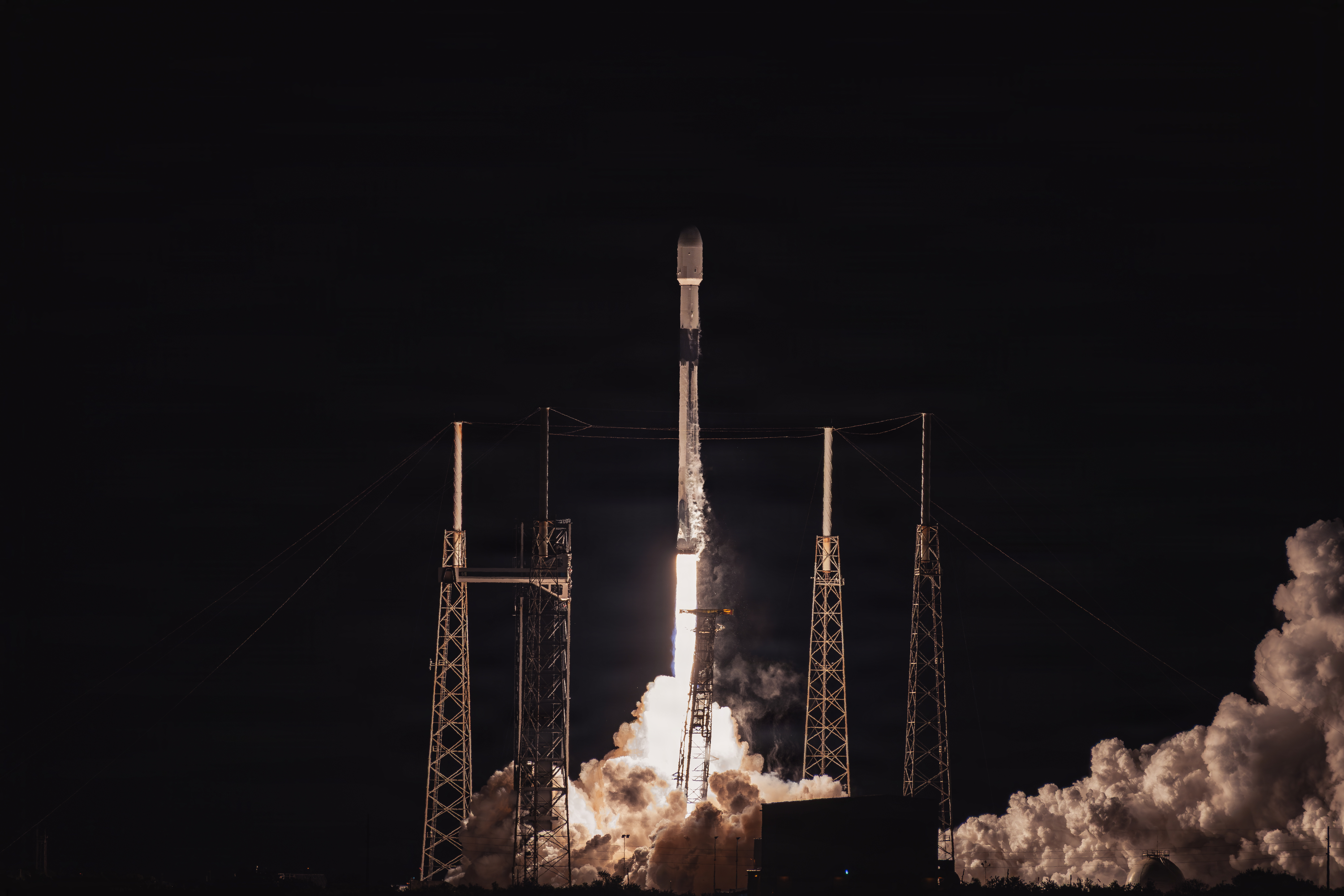
- Launch of GPS-III 09
- Names: Navstar 85; GPS-III SV09; Ellison Onizuka
- Mission type: Navigation
- Operator: USSF
- COSPAR ID: 2026-017A
- SATCAT no.: 67588

Spacecraft properties
- Spacecraft: GPS-III SV09
- Spacecraft type: GPS Block III
- Bus: A2100M
- Manufacturer: Lockheed Martin

Start of mission
- Launch date: 28 Jan 2026; 04:53
- Rocket: Falcon 9
- Launch site: Cape Canaveral, SLC-40
- Contractor: SpaceX

Orbital parameters
- Reference system: Geocentric orbit
- Regime: Medium Earth orbit (Semi-synchronous orbit)

USA-581, also known as GPS-III SV09, NAVSTAR 85, and Ellison Onizuka, is a United States navigation satellite which forms part of the Global Positioning System.

== Satellite ==
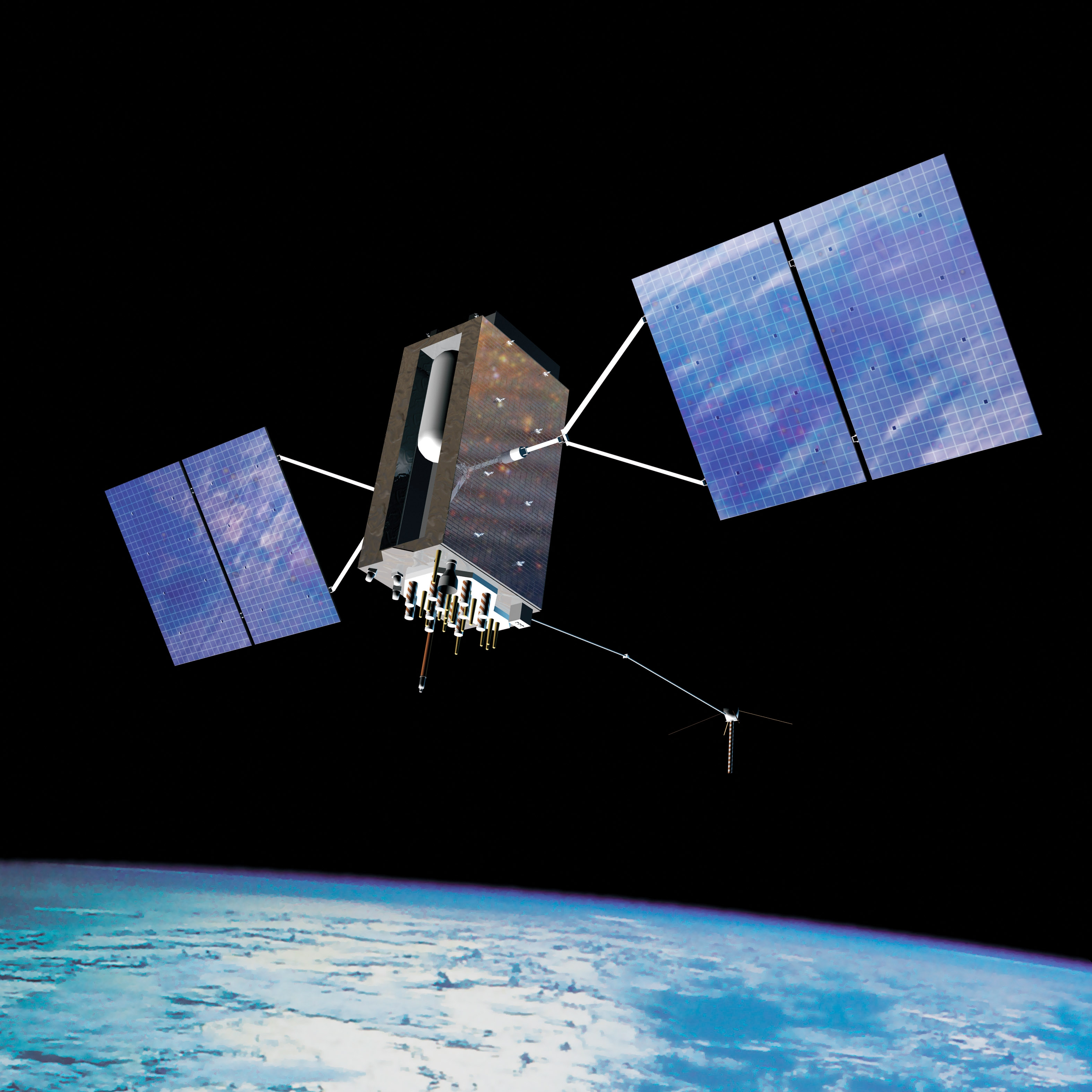
Artist's rendering of GPS-III satellite in orbit

SV09 was the ninth GPS Block III satellite to launch. The spacecraft is built on the Lockheed Martin A2100 satellite bus, and weighs in at 4,331 kg (9,548 lb). The space vehicle manufacturing contract was awarded September 2016. The satellite was named "Ellison Onizuka" on 12 May 2021 following its successful core mate assembly. It was declared "Available for Launch" on 23 Aug 2022.

SV09 is the first in the Block III series to use a laser retroreflector array. LRAs are a system of mirrors designed to reflect beams of light back to their source. They are used for laser ranging, a technique that enables the measurement of precise distance by observing the time it takes for a pulse of light to travel from a ground station to the mirrors and back.

== Launch ==
The satellite's launch was originally awarded to ULA but it was later switched to SpaceX because of delays in ULA's Vulcan rocket certification. In exchange, ULA was awarded another GPS launch originally planned for Falcon Heavy.

SV09 was launched by SpaceX on 28 January 2026 at 04:53 UTC, atop a Falcon 9 rocket. The launch took place from SLC-40 at Cape Canaveral Space Force Station.
