= USA-151 =

American navigation satellite used for GPS

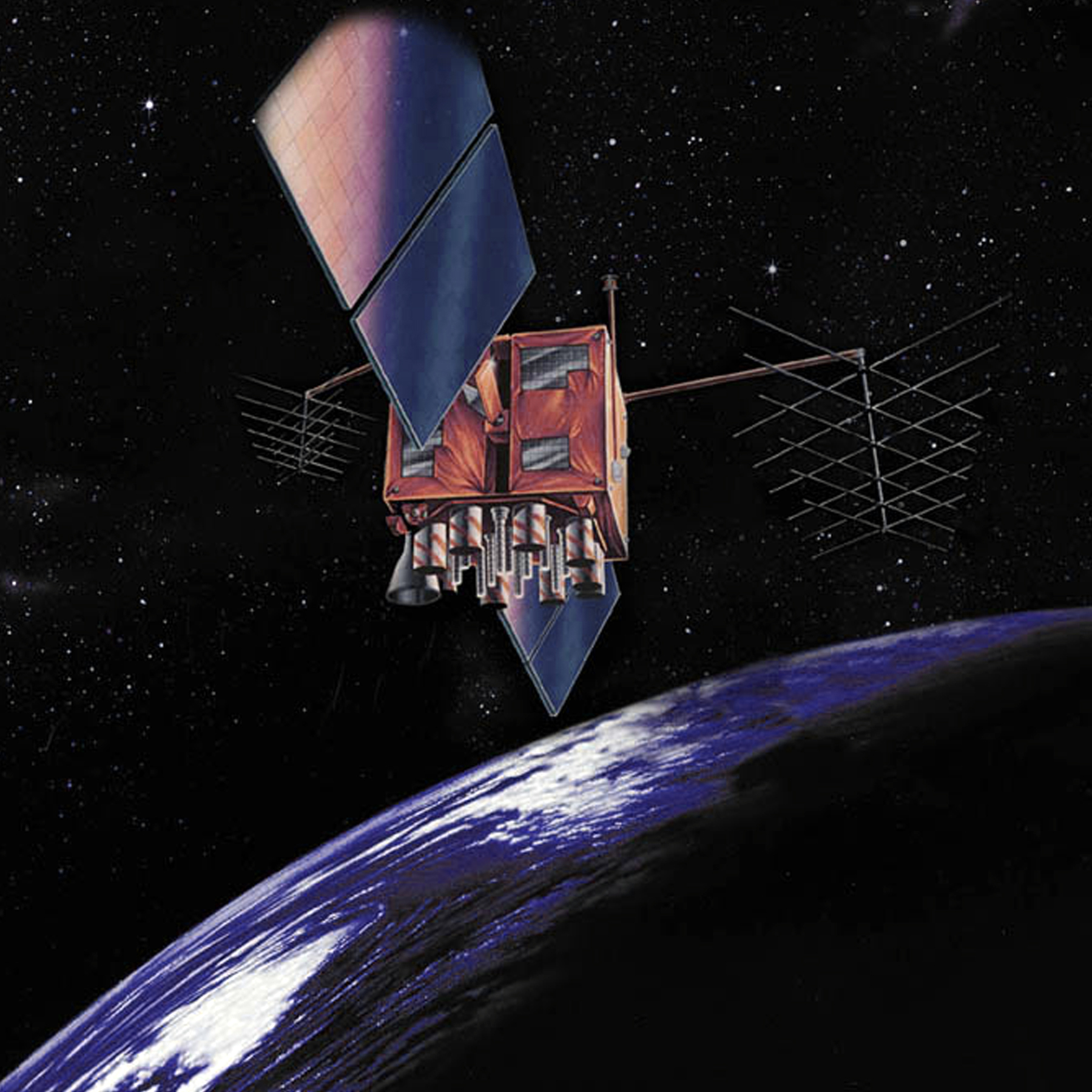
- A Block IIR GPS satellite
- Mission type: Navigation
- Operator: US Air Force
- COSPAR ID: 2000-040A
- SATCAT no.: 26407
- Mission duration: 10 years (planned); 24 years, 8 months, 14 days (in progress)

Spacecraft properties
- Spacecraft type: GPS Block IIR
- Bus: AS-4000
- Manufacturer: Lockheed Martin
- Launch mass: 2,032 kilograms (4,480 lb)

Start of mission
- Launch date: 16 July 2000, 09:17:00 UTC
- Rocket: Delta II 7925-9.5, D279
- Launch site: Cape Canaveral SLC-17A

End of mission
- Disposal: Decommissioned
- Deactivated: 19 Dec 2024

Orbital parameters
- Reference system: Geocentric
- Regime: Medium Earth (Semi-synchronous)
- Perigee altitude: 20,184 kilometres (12,542 mi)
- Apogee altitude: 20,426 kilometres (12,692 mi)
- Inclination: 55 degrees
- Period: 722.98 minutes

USA-151, also known as GPS IIR-5, GPS SVN-44, and Navstar-48 is an American navigation satellite which forms part of the Global Positioning System. It was the fifth Block IIR GPS satellite to be launched, out of thirteen in the original configuration, and twenty one overall. It was built by Lockheed Martin, using the AS-4000 satellite bus.

USA-151 was launched at 09:17:00 UTC on 16 July 2000, atop a Delta II carrier rocket, flight number D279, flying in the 7925-9.5 configuration. The launch took place from Space Launch Complex 17A at the Cape Canaveral Air Force Station, and placed USA-151 into a transfer orbit. The satellite raised itself into medium Earth orbit using a Star-37FM apogee motor.

By 27 July 2000, USA-151 was in an orbit with a perigee of 20,184 kilometres (12,542 mi), an apogee of 20,426 kilometres (12,692 mi), a period of 722.98 minutes, and 55 degrees of inclination to the equator. It is used to broadcast the PRN 28 signal, and operates in slot 3 of plane B of the GPS constellation, having originally been operated in slot 5. The satellite has a mass of 2,032 kilograms (4,480 lb), and a design life of 10 years.

It was originally retired on 23 June 2021. On 14 Aug 2023, it was reactivated to replace SVN-63. It was decommissioned 19 December 2024 ahead of the entry to service of USA-440.

It was subsequently reactivated again 22 January 2025 using PRN21.
