= USA-180 =

American navigation satellite used for GPS

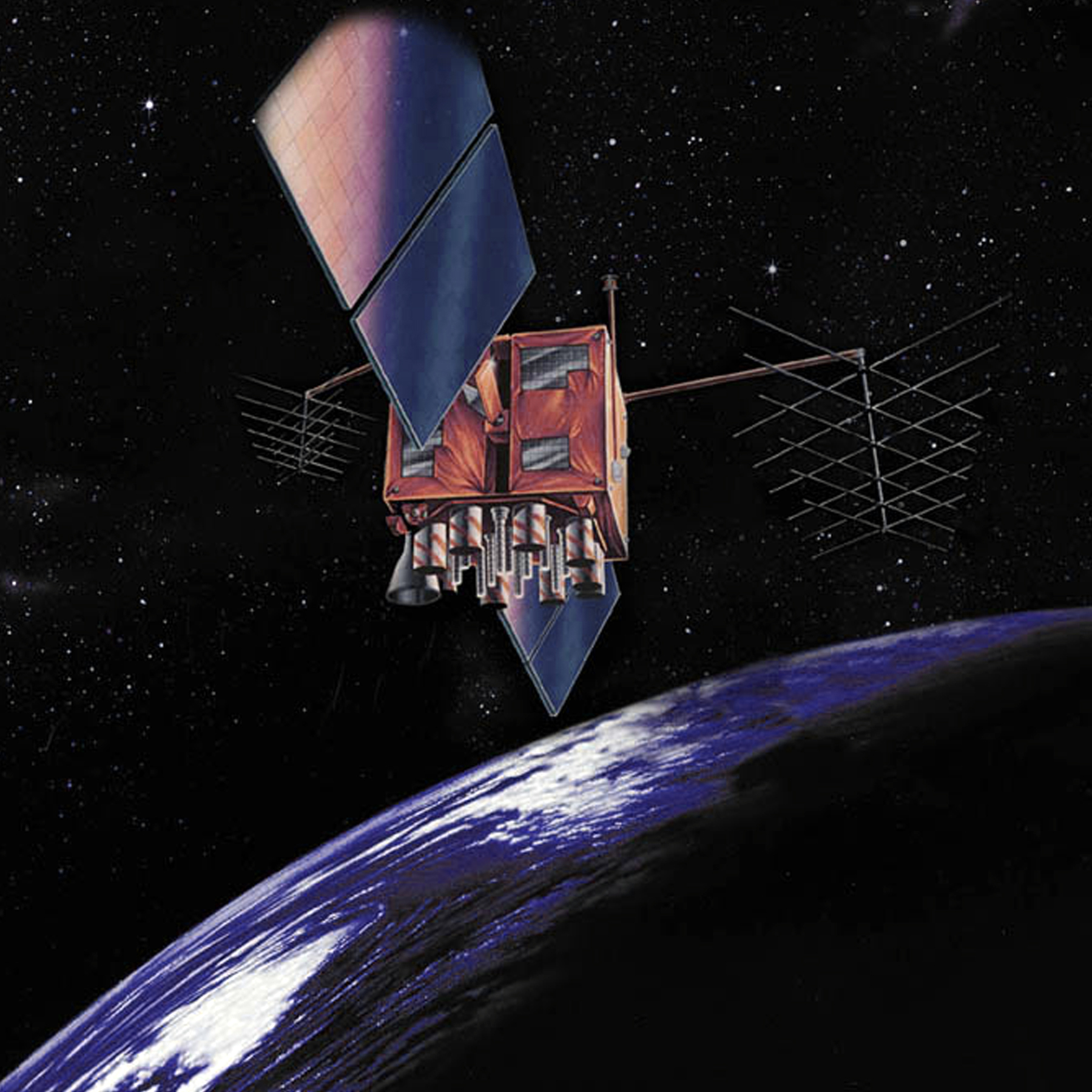
- A Block IIR GPS satellite
- Mission type: Navigation
- Operator: US Air Force
- COSPAR ID: 2004-045A
- SATCAT no.: 28474
- Mission duration: 10 years (planned)

Spacecraft properties
- Spacecraft type: GPS Block IIR
- Bus: AS-4000
- Manufacturer: Lockheed Martin
- Launch mass: 2,032 kilograms (4,480 lb)

Start of mission
- Launch date: 6 November 2004, 05:39:00 UTC
- Rocket: Delta II 7925-9.5, D308
- Launch site: Cape Canaveral SLC-17B

Orbital parameters
- Reference system: Geocentric
- Regime: Medium Earth (Semi-synchronous)
- Perigee altitude: 19,936 kilometres (12,388 mi)
- Apogee altitude: 20,426 kilometres (12,692 mi)
- Inclination: 54.8 degrees
- Period: 717.94 minutes

USA-180, also known as GPS IIR-13 and GPS SVN-61, is an American navigation satellite which forms part of the Global Positioning System. It was the thirteenth of twenty one Block IIR GPS satellites to be launched, and the last in the original configuration. It was built by Lockheed Martin, using the AS-4000 satellite bus.

USA-180 was launched at 05:39:00 UTC on 6 November 2004, atop a Delta II carrier rocket, flight number D308, flying in the 7925–9.5 configuration. The launch took place from Space Launch Complex 17B at the Cape Canaveral Air Force Station, and placed USA-180 into a transfer orbit. The satellite raised itself into medium Earth orbit using a Star-37FM apogee motor.

By 5 January 2005, USA-180 was in an orbit with a perigee of 19,936 kilometres (12,388 mi), an apogee of 20,426 kilometres (12,692 mi), a period of 717.94 minutes, and 54.8 degrees of inclination to the equator. It is used to broadcast the PRN 02 signal, and operates in slot 1 of plane D of the GPS constellation. The satellite has a mass of 2,032 kilograms (4,480 lb), and a design life of 10 years. As of 2019 it remains in service.
