= USA-545 =

GPS III satellite

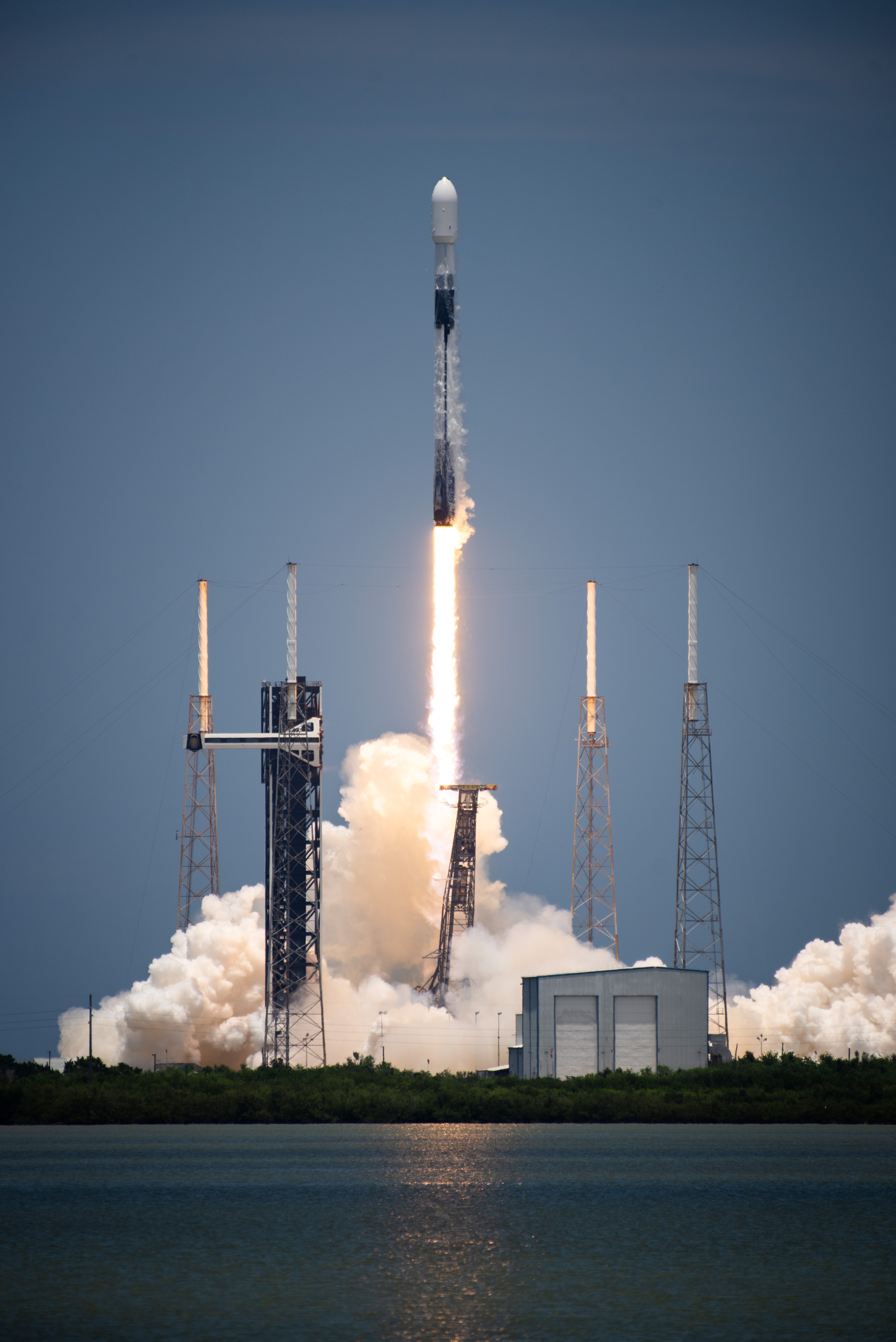
- Launch of GPS-III 08
- Names: Navstar 84; GPS-III SV08; Katherine Johnson
- Mission type: Navigation
- Operator: USSF
- COSPAR ID: 2025-116A
- SATCAT no.: 64202

Spacecraft properties
- Spacecraft: GPS-III SV08
- Spacecraft type: GPS Block III
- Bus: A2100M
- Manufacturer: Lockheed Martin

Start of mission
- Launch date: 30 May 2025; 17:37
- Rocket: Falcon 9 Block 5 (F9-482)
- Launch site: Cape Canaveral, SLC-40
- Contractor: SpaceX

Orbital parameters
- Reference system: Geocentric orbit
- Regime: Medium Earth orbit (Semi-synchronous orbit)

USA-545, also known as GPS-III SV08, NAVSTAR 84, and Katherine Johnson, is a United States navigation satellite which forms part of the Global Positioning System.

== Satellite ==
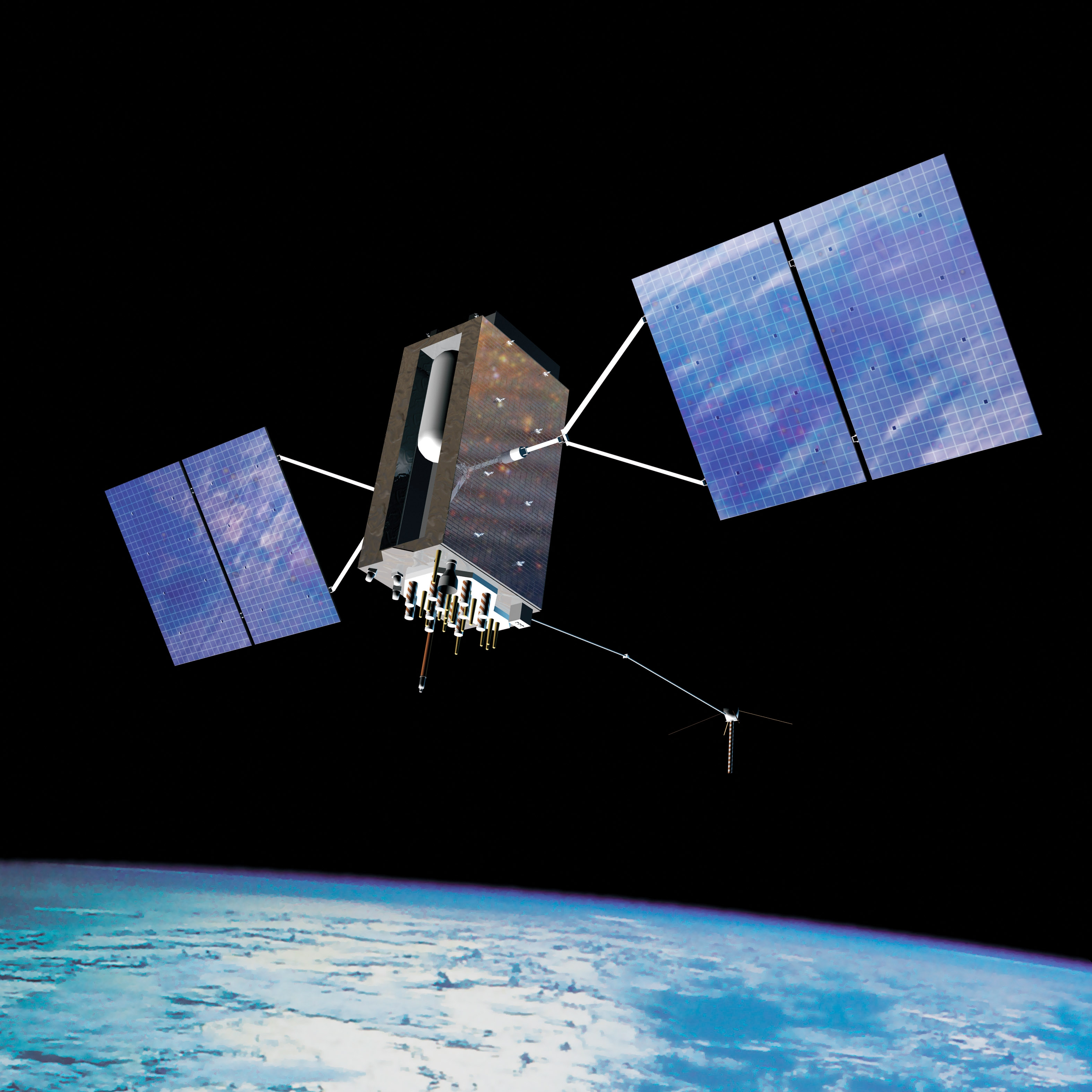
Artist's rendering of GPS-III satellite in orbit

SV08 is the eighth GPS Block III satellite to launch. The spacecraft is built on the Lockheed Martin A2100 satellite bus, and weighs in at 4,331 kg (9,548 lb).

The manufacturing contract was awarded in February 2013. The satellite was named "Katherine Johnson" in June 2020 following its successful core mate assembly. Declared "Available for Launch" on 10 June 2021.

== Launch ==
The satellite's launch was originally awarded to ULA but it was later switched to SpaceX because of delays in ULA's Vulcan rocket certification. In exchange, ULA was awarded another GPS launch originally planned for Falcon Heavy.

USA-545 was launched by SpaceX on 30 May 2025 at 17:37 UTC, atop a Falcon 9 rocket, in a mission named GPS III-7 as it was their 7th GPS launch.

The launch took place from SLC-40 at Cape Canaveral Space Force Station.
