= USA-132 =

American navigation satellite used for GPS

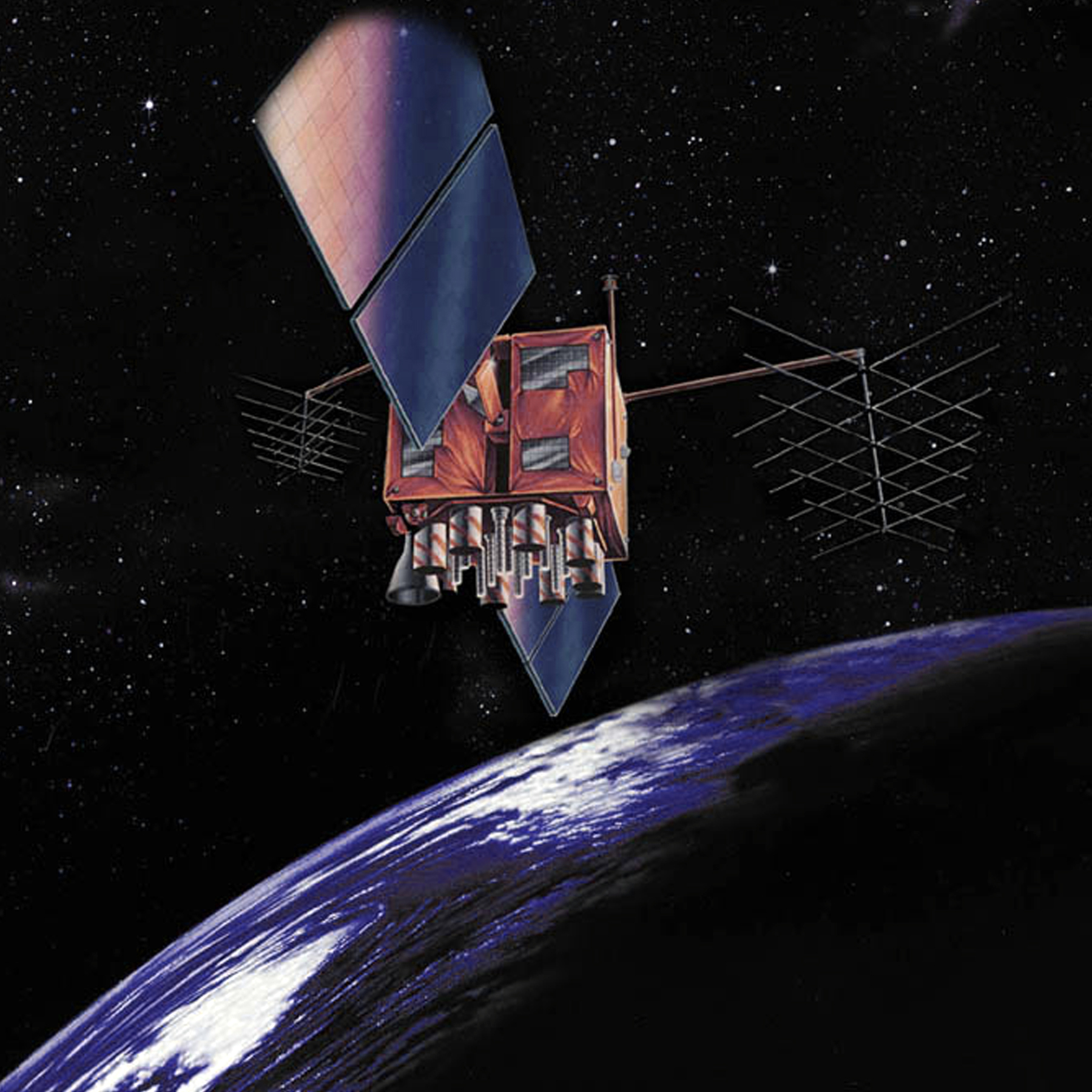
- A Block IIR GPS satellite
- Names: Navstar 43; GPS IIR-2; GPS SVN-43
- Mission type: Navigation
- Operator: U.S. Air Force
- COSPAR ID: 1997-035A
- SATCAT no.: 24876
- Mission duration: 10 years (planned); 28 years, 11 months and 13 days (elapsed)

Spacecraft properties
- Spacecraft: GPS IIR
- Spacecraft type: GPS Block IIR
- Bus: AS-4000
- Manufacturer: Lockheed Martin
- Launch mass: 2,032 kg (4,480 lb)

Start of mission
- Launch date: 23 July 1997, 03:43:01 UTC
- Rocket: Delta II 7925-9.5 (Delta D245)
- Launch site: Cape Canaveral, LC-17A
- Contractor: McDonnell Douglas
- Entered service: 22 August 1997

Orbital parameters
- Reference system: Geocentric orbit
- Regime: Medium Earth orbit (Semi-synchronous)
- Slot: F3 (slot 3 plane F)
- Perigee altitude: 19,023 km (11,820 mi)
- Apogee altitude: 20,224 km (12,567 mi)
- Inclination: 54.90°
- Period: 713.00 minutes

USA-132, also known as GPS IIR-2 and GPS SVN-43, is an American navigation satellite which forms part of the Global Positioning System. It was the second Block IIR GPS satellite to be launched, out of thirteen in the original configuration, and twenty-one overall. GPS IIR-1 failed to achieve orbit, so USA-132 was the first successful Block IIR satellite. It was built by Lockheed Martin, using the AS-4000 satellite bus.

== Launch ==
USA-132 was launched at 03:43:01 UTC on 23 July 1997, atop a Delta II launch vehicle, flight number D245, flying in the 7925-9.5 configuration. The launch took place from Launch Complex 17A (LC-17A) at the Cape Canaveral Air Force Station (CCAFS), and placed USA-132 into a transfer orbit. The satellite raised itself into medium Earth orbit using a Star-37FM apogee motor.

== Mission ==
On 22 August 1997, USA-132 was in an orbit with a perigee of 19,023 km (11,820 mi), an apogee of 20,224 km (12,567 mi), a period of 713.00 minutes, and 54.90° of inclination to the equator. It is used to broadcast the PRN 13 signal, and operates in slot 3 of plane F of the GPS constellation. The satellite has a mass of 2,032 kg (4,480 lb), and a design life of 10 years. On 24th April 2026, it was placed into a decommissioned status. remains in service and holds the record for the longest operational GPS satellite.
