= USA-192 =

American navigation satellite used for GPS

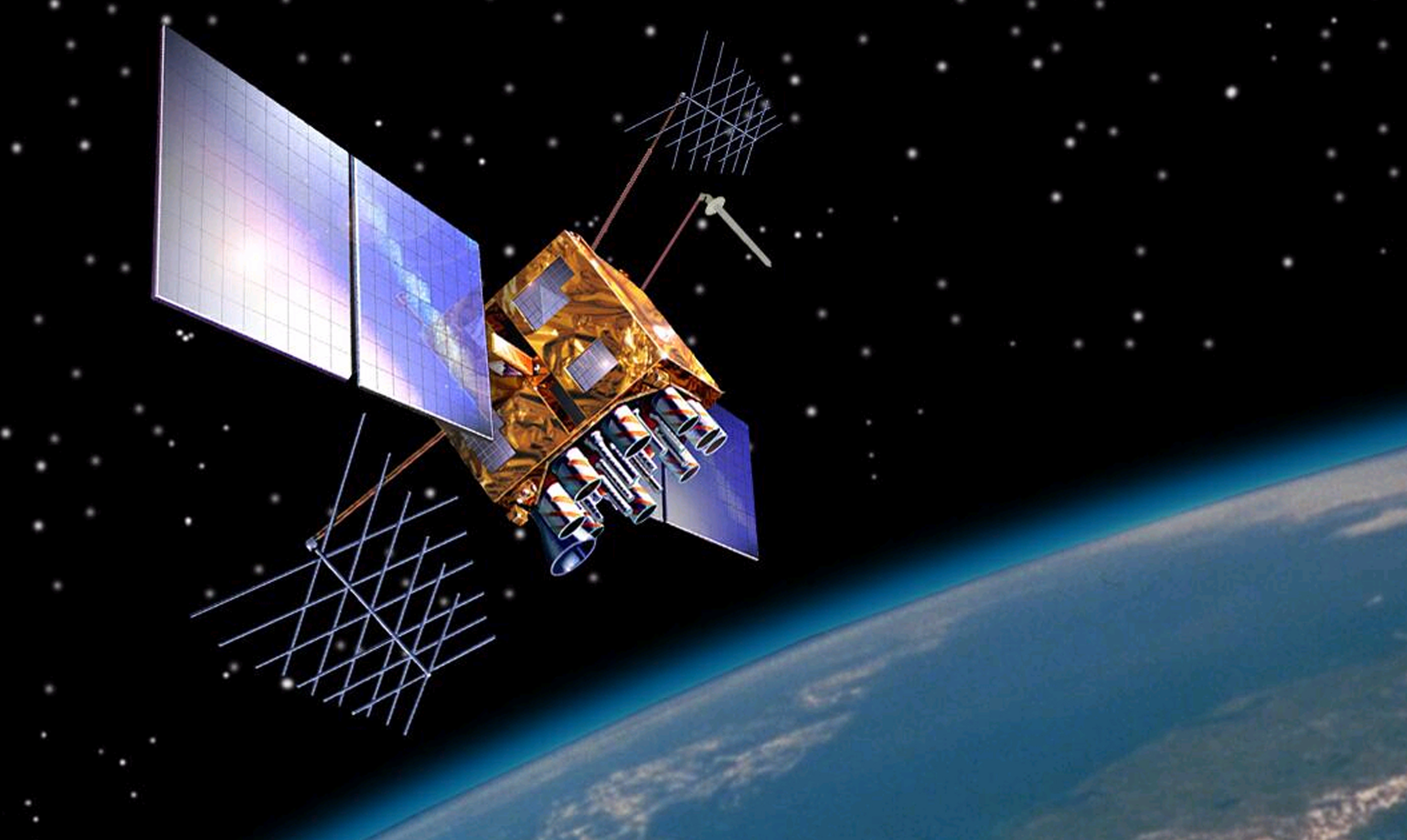
- A Block IIRM GPS satellite
- Mission type: Navigation
- Operator: US Air Force
- COSPAR ID: 2006-052A
- SATCAT no.: 29601
- Mission duration: 10 years (planned)

Spacecraft properties
- Spacecraft type: GPS Block IIRM
- Bus: AS-4000
- Manufacturer: Lockheed Martin
- Launch mass: 2,032 kilograms (4,480 lb)

Start of mission
- Launch date: 17 November 2006, 19:12:00 UTC
- Rocket: Delta II 7925-9.5, D321
- Launch site: Cape Canaveral SLC-17A

Orbital parameters
- Reference system: Geocentric
- Regime: Medium Earth (Semi-synchronous)
- Perigee altitude: 20,087 kilometers (12,481 mi)
- Apogee altitude: 20,277 kilometers (12,600 mi)
- Inclination: 55 degrees
- Period: 717.96 minutes

USA-192, also known as GPS IIR-16(M), GPS IIRM-3 and GPS SVN-58, is an American navigation satellite which forms part of the Global Positioning System. It was the third of eight Block IIRM satellites to be launched, and the sixteenth of twenty one Block IIR satellites overall. It was built by Lockheed Martin, using the AS-4000 satellite bus.

USA-192 was launched at 19:12:00 UTC on 17 November 2006, atop a Delta II carrier rocket, flight number D321, flying in the 7925-9.5 configuration. The launch took place from Space Launch Complex 17A at the Cape Canaveral Air Force Station, and placed USA-192 into a transfer orbit. The satellite raised itself into medium Earth orbit using a Star-37FM apogee motor.

By 17 January 2007, USA-192 was in an orbit with a perigee of 20,087 kilometers (12,481 mi), an apogee of 20,277 kilometers (12,600 mi), a period of 717.96 minutes, and 55 degrees of inclination to the equator. It is used to broadcast the PRN 12 signal, and operates in slot 4 of plane B of the GPS constellation. The satellite has a mass of 2,032 kilograms (4,480 lb), and a design life of 10 years. As of 2019 it remains in service.
