= USA-196 =

American navigation satellite used for GPS

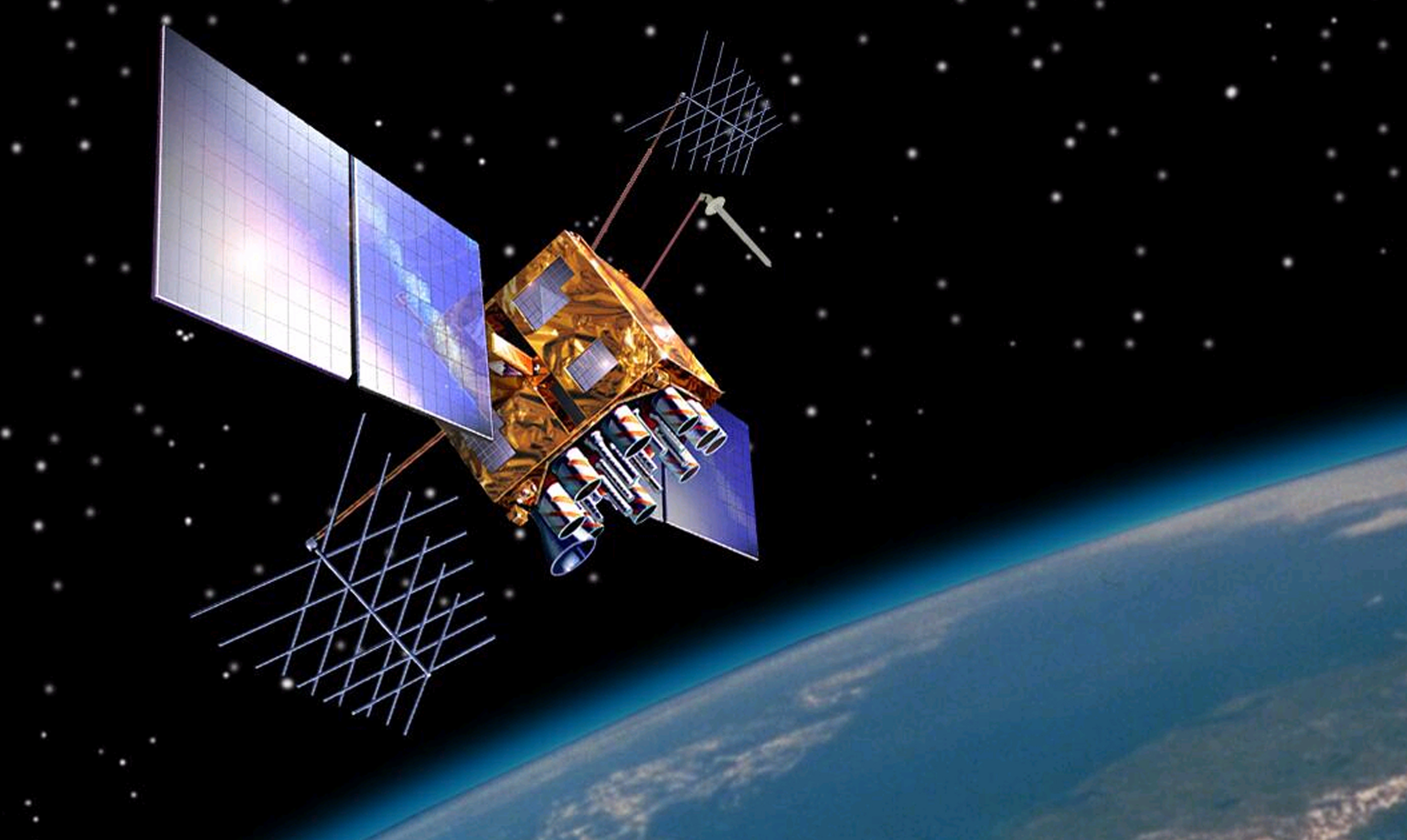
- A Block IIRM GPS satellite
- Mission type: Navigation
- Operator: US Air Force
- COSPAR ID: 2007-047A
- SATCAT no.: 32260
- Mission duration: 10 years (planned)

Spacecraft properties
- Spacecraft type: GPS Block IIRM
- Bus: AS-4000
- Manufacturer: Lockheed Martin
- Launch mass: 2,032 kilograms (4,480 lb)

Start of mission
- Launch date: 17 October 2007, 12:23:00 UTC
- Rocket: Delta II 7925-9.5, D328
- Launch site: Cape Canaveral SLC-17A

Orbital parameters
- Reference system: Geocentric
- Regime: Medium Earth (Semi-synchronous)
- Perigee altitude: 20,149 kilometers (12,520 mi)
- Apogee altitude: 20,214 kilometers (12,560 mi)
- Inclination: 54.8 degrees
- Period: 717.94 minutes

USA-196, also known as GPS IIR-17(M), GPS IIRM-4 and GPS SVN-55, is an American navigation satellite which forms part of the Global Positioning System. It was the fourth of eight Block IIRM satellites to be launched, and the seventeenth of twenty one Block IIR satellites overall. It was built by Lockheed Martin, using the AS-4000 satellite bus.

USA-196 was launched at 12:23:00 UTC on 17 October 2007, atop a Delta II carrier rocket, flight number D328, flying in the 7925-9.5 configuration. The launch took place from Space Launch Complex 17A at the Cape Canaveral Air Force Station, and placed USA-196 into a transfer orbit. The satellite raised itself into medium Earth orbit using a Star-37FM apogee motor.

By 27 October 2007, USA-196 was in an orbit with a perigee of 20,149 kilometers (12,520 mi), an apogee of 20,214 kilometers (12,560 mi), a period of 717.94 minutes, and 54.8 degrees of inclination to the equator. It is used to broadcast the PRN 15 signal, and operates in slot 2 of plane F of the GPS constellation. The satellite has a design life of 10 years and a mass of 2,032 kilograms (4,480 lb). As of 2015 it remains in service.
