= USA-166 =

American navigation satellite used for GPS

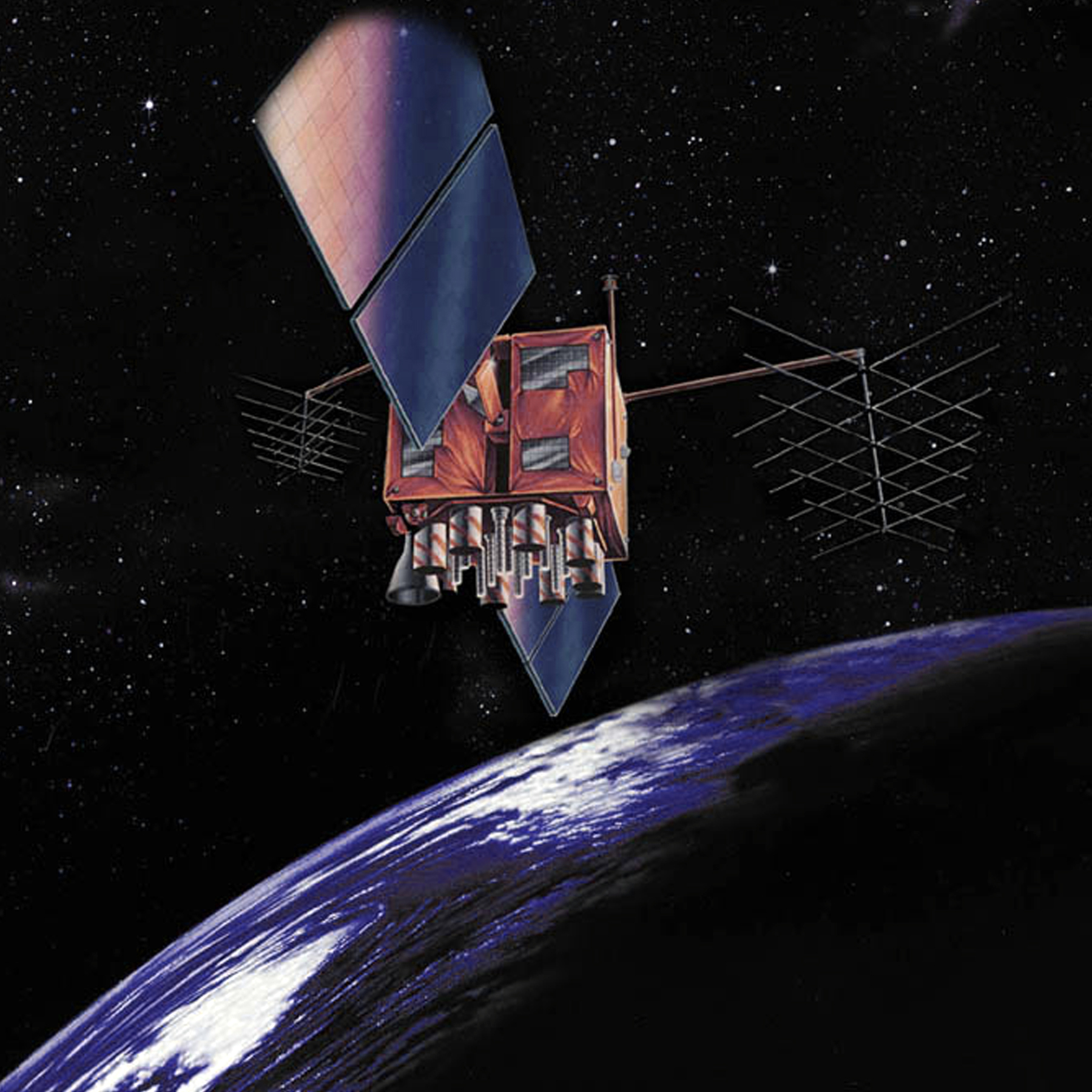
- A Block IIR GPS satellite
- Mission type: Navigation
- Operator: US Air Force
- COSPAR ID: 2003-005A
- SATCAT no.: 27663
- Mission duration: 10 years (planned)

Spacecraft properties
- Spacecraft type: GPS Block IIR
- Bus: AS-4000
- Manufacturer: Lockheed Martin
- Launch mass: 2,032 kilograms (4,480 lb)

Start of mission
- Launch date: 29 January 2003, 18:06:00 UTC
- Rocket: Delta II 7925-9.5, D295
- Launch site: Cape Canaveral SLC-17B

Orbital parameters
- Reference system: Geocentric
- Regime: Medium Earth (Semi-synchronous)
- Perigee altitude: 20,155 kilometres (12,524 mi)
- Apogee altitude: 20,344 kilometres (12,641 mi)
- Inclination: 55 degrees
- Period: 720.7 minutes

USA-166, also known as GPS IIR-8 and GPS SVN-56, is an American navigation satellite which forms part of the Global Positioning System. It was the eighth Block IIR GPS satellite to be launched, out of thirteen in the original configuration, and twenty one overall. It was built by Lockheed Martin, using the AS-4000 satellite bus.

USA-166 was launched at 18:06:00 UTC on 29 January 2003, atop a Delta II carrier rocket, flight number D295, flying in the 7925-9.5 configuration. The XSS-10 satellite was carried as a secondary payload on the same rocket, but was deployed from the second stage of the three-stage rocket. The launch took place from Space Launch Complex 17B at the Cape Canaveral Air Force Station, and placed USA-166 into a transfer orbit. The satellite raised itself into medium Earth orbit using a Star-37FM apogee motor.

By 1 February 2003, USA-166 was in an orbit with a perigee of 20,155 kilometres (12,524 mi), an apogee of 20,344 kilometres (12,641 mi), a period of 720.7 minutes, and 55 degrees of inclination to the equator. It is used to broadcast the PRN 16 signal, and operates in slot 1 of plane B of the GPS constellation. The satellite has a mass of 2,032 kilograms (4,480 lb), and a design life of 10 years. As of 2012 it remains in service.
