= USA-154 =

American navigation satellite used for GPS

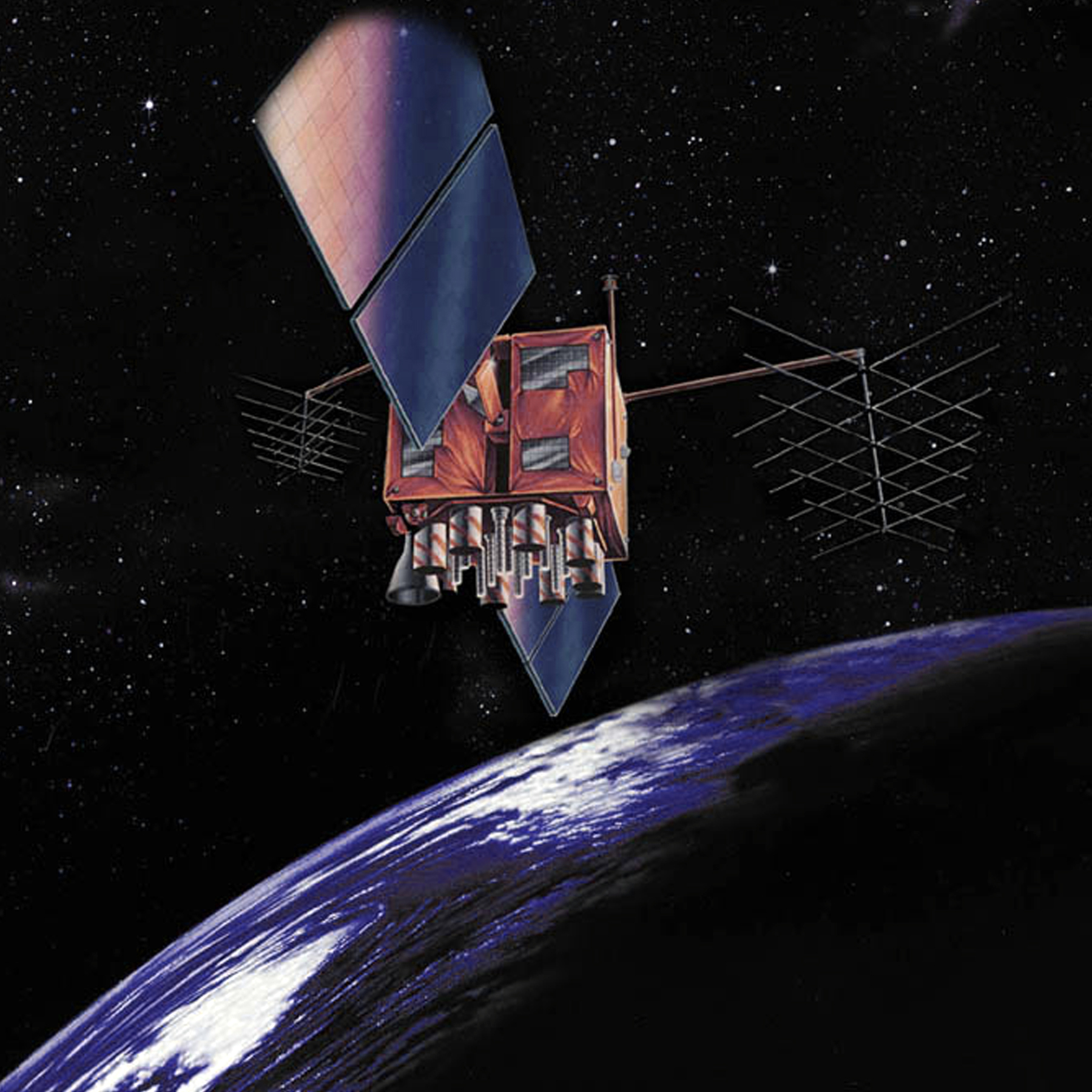
- A Block IIR GPS satellite
- Mission type: Navigation
- Operator: US Air Force
- COSPAR ID: 2000-071A
- SATCAT no.: 26605
- Mission duration: 10 years (planned); Final: 22 years, 2 months and 15 days

Spacecraft properties
- Spacecraft type: GPS Block IIR
- Bus: AS-4000
- Manufacturer: Lockheed Martin
- Launch mass: 2,032 kilograms (4,480 lb)

Start of mission
- Launch date: 10 November 2000, 17:14:02 UTC
- Rocket: Delta II 7925-9.5, D281
- Launch site: Cape Canaveral SLC-17A

End of mission
- Disposal: Decommissioned
- Deactivated: 25 January 2023

Orbital parameters
- Reference system: Geocentric
- Regime: Medium Earth (Semi-synchronous)
- Perigee altitude: 20,177 kilometres (12,537 mi)
- Apogee altitude: 20,498 kilometres (12,737 mi)
- Inclination: 55 degrees
- Period: 724.28 minutes

USA-154, also known as GPS IIR-6 and GPS SVN-41, is an American navigation satellite which forms part of the Global Positioning System. It was the sixth Block IIR GPS satellite to be launched, out of thirteen in the original configuration, and twenty one overall. It was built by Lockheed Martin, using the AS-4000 satellite bus.

USA-154 was launched at 17:14:02 UTC on 10 November 2000, atop a Delta II carrier rocket, flight number D281, flying in the 7925–9.5 configuration. The launch took place from Space Launch Complex 17A at the Cape Canaveral Air Force Station, and placed USA-154 into a transfer orbit. The satellite raised itself into medium Earth orbit using a Star-37FM apogee motor.

By 13 November 2000, USA-154 was in an orbit with a perigee of 20,177 kilometres (12,537 mi), an apogee of 20,498 kilometres (12,737 mi), a period of 724.28 minutes, and 55 degrees of inclination to the equator. It was used to broadcast the PRN 14 signal, and operated in slot 5 of plane F of the GPS constellation. The satellite had a mass of 2,032 kilograms (4,480 lb), and a design life of 10 years.

USA-154 was initially retired on 9 July 2020. It was subsequently reactivated on 20 January 2022 and decommissioned again on 25 January 2023.
