= USA-309 =

GPS III satellite

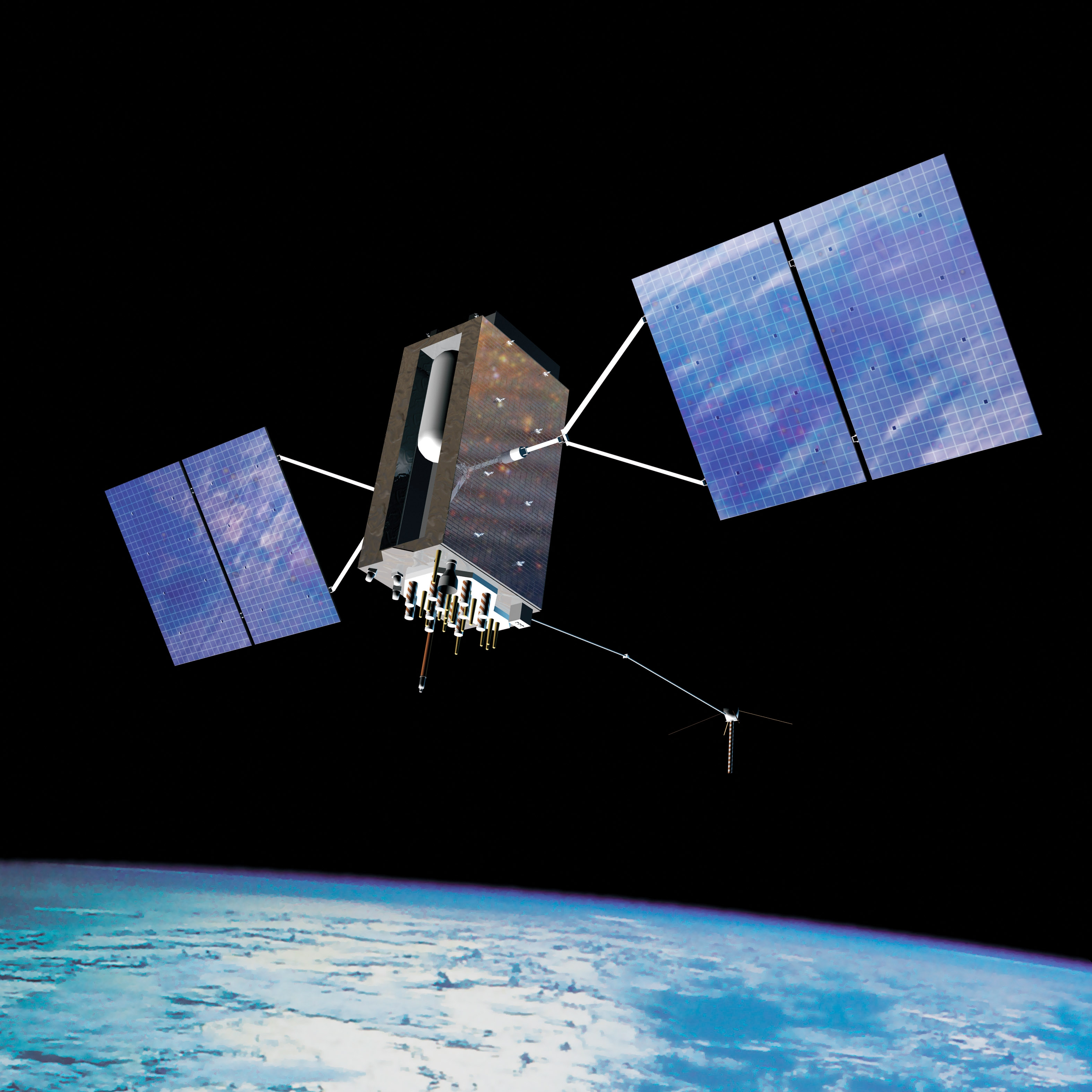
- Artist's rendering of GPS-III satellite in orbit
- Names: Navstar 80; GPS-III SV04; Sacagawea
- Mission type: Navigation
- Operator: USSF
- COSPAR ID: 2020-078A
- SATCAT no.: 46826
- Mission duration: 15 years (planned)

Spacecraft properties
- Spacecraft: GPS-III SV04
- Spacecraft type: GPS Block III
- Bus: A2100M
- Manufacturer: Lockheed Martin
- Launch mass: 4331 kg
- Power: watts

Start of mission
- Launch date: 5 November 2020, 23:24 UTC
- Rocket: Falcon 9 Block 5 (F9-097)
- Launch site: Cape Canaveral, SLC-40
- Contractor: SpaceX

Orbital parameters
- Reference system: Geocentric orbit
- Regime: Medium Earth orbit (Semi-synchronous orbit)
- Perigee altitude: 20,181 km (12,540 mi)
- Apogee altitude: 20,196 km (12,549 mi)
- Inclination: 54.9°
- Period: 718.0 minutes

USA-309, also known as GPS-III SV04, NAVSTAR 80 or Sacagawea, is a United States navigation satellite which forms part of the Global Positioning System. It was the fourth GPS Block III satellite to be launched.

== Satellite ==
SV04 is the fourth GPS Block III satellite to be launched. Launch was pushed back several times due to delays with the earlier satellites.

The spacecraft is built on the Lockheed Martin A2100 satellite bus, and weighs in at 4,331 kg (9,548 lb).

== Launch ==
USA-309 was launched by SpaceX on 5th of November 2020 at 23:24 UTC atop Falcon 9 booster B1062. The launch took place from SLC-40 of the Cape Canaveral Air Force Station, and placed USA-309 directly into semi-synchronous orbit. About eight minutes after launch, Falcon 9 B1062 successfully landed on the droneship Of Course I Still Love You.

== Orbit ==
As of 2021, USA-309 was in a 54.9 degree inclination orbit with a perigee of 20,181 kilometers (12,540 mi) and an apogee of 20,198 km (12,550 mi).
