= Semi-synchronous orbit =

Type of astronomical orbit

A semi-synchronous orbit is an orbit with a period equal to half the average rotational period of the body being orbited, and in the same direction as that body's rotation.

For Earth, a semi-synchronous orbit is considered a medium Earth orbit, with a period of just under 12 hours. For circular Earth orbits, the altitude is approximately 20,200 kilometres (12,600 mi).

Semi-synchronous orbits are typical for GPS satellites.

== See also ==
- Molniya orbit
- List of orbits
- Synchronous orbit
