= List of USA satellites (1-500) =

This is a list of satellites and spacecraft that have been given USA designations by the United States Air Force. These designations have been applied to most United States military satellites since 1984, and replaced the earlier OPS designation.

As of April 2024, USA designations have been assigned to 544 space satellites. There is not always a one-to-one mapping between launch vehicles and mission spacecraft. This can occasionally result in gaps when maintaining records that incorrectly make that assumption, such as the "missing" entries for USA-163 (which are, symmetrically, contemporary with confusion over "splitting" spacecraft tracks).

== List ==
Number	Launch date	COSPAR-ID	Function	Launch vehicle	Other designations	Status	Remarks
USA-1	1984-06-13		Navigation	Atlas E/F	GPS-9	Out of service	
USA-2	1984-05-25	1984-065A	Reconnaissance	Titan 34D	KH-9	Deorbited: 18 October 1984	Launched with USA-3
USA-3	1984-05-25	1984-065C	ELINT	Titan 34D	SSF-D	Out of service	Launched with USA-2
USA-4	1984-08-28	1984-091A	Communications	Titan 34B	SDS	Out of service	
USA-5	1984-09-08		Navigation	Atlas E/F	Navstar-10	Out of service	
USA-6	1984-12-04	1984-122A	Reconnaissance	Titan 34D	KH-11	Decayed: 31 December 1990	
USA-7	1984-12-22		Missile detection	Titan 34D / Transtage	DSP-2-6R	Retired: 31 December 1994	
USA-8	1985-01-24	1985-010B	ELINT	Space Shuttle Discovery	Magnum	Out of service	
USA-9	1985-02-08	1985-014A	Communications	Titan 34B	SDS	Out of service	
USA-10	1985-10-09		Navigation	Atlas E/F	Navstar-11	Out of service	
USA-11	1985-10-03		Communications	Space Shuttle Atlantis	DSCS-III-B4	Out of service	Launched with USA-12
USA-12	1985-10-03		Communications	Space Shuttle Atlantis	DSCS-III-B5	Out of service	Launched with USA-11
USA-13	1985-12-13		Inflatable ASAT target	Scout-G	ITV-1	Failed. Decayed: 1989-05-11	Launched with USA-14. Failed to inflate.
USA-14	1985-12-13		Inflatable ASAT target	Scout-G	ITV-2	Decayed: 1987-08-09	Launched with USA-13. Unused
USA-15	1986-02-09	1986-014A	ELINT / Ocean surveillance	Atlas H	NOSS (PARCAE/White Cloud)	Out of service	Deployed subsatellites, USA-16, 17 and 18
USA-16	1986-02-09	1986-014E	ELINT / Ocean surveillance	Atlas H	NOSS (PARCAE/White Cloud)	Out of service	Subsatellite of USA-15
USA-17	1986-02-09	1986-014F	ELINT / Ocean surveillance	Atlas H	NOSS (PARCAE/White Cloud)	Out of service	Subsatellite of USA-15
USA-18	1986-02-09	1986-014H	ELINT / Ocean surveillance	Atlas H	NOSS (PARCAE/White Cloud)	Out of service	Subsatellite of USA-15
USA-19	1986-09-05	1986-069A	Sensor development	Delta 3920	SDI	Deorbited: 1986-09-28	
USA-20	1986-12-05		Communications	Atlas G	Fltsatcom-7		
USA-21	1987-02-12	1987-015A	Communications	Titan 34B	SDS	Out of service	
USA-22	1987-05-15	1987-043A	ELINT / Ocean surveillance	Atlas H	NOSS (PARCAE/White Cloud)	Out of service	Deployed subsatellites, USA-23, 24 and 25
USA-23	1987-05-15	1987-043E	ELINT / Ocean surveillance	Atlas H	NOSS (PARCAE/White Cloud)	Out of service	Subsatellite of USA-22
USA-24	1987-05-15	1987-043F	ELINT / Ocean surveillance	Atlas H	NOSS (PARCAE/White Cloud)	Out of service	Subsatellite of USA-22
USA-25	1987-05-15	1987-043H	ELINT / Ocean surveillance	Atlas H	NOSS (PARCAE/White Cloud)	Out of service	Subsatellite of USA-22
USA-26	1987-06-20		Weather	Atlas E/F	DMSP-5D2 F3 (S8)		
USA-27	1987-10-26	1987-090A	Reconnaissance	Titan 34D	KH-11	Decayed: 1992-05-31	
USA-28	1987-11-29		Missile detection	Titan 34D / Transtage	DSP-2-5R	Retired: 1987-12-31	
USA-29	1988-02-03		Weather	Atlas E/F	DMSP-5D2 F4 (S-9)		
USA-30	1988-02-08		Training satellite	Delta 3910	SDI	Deorbited: 1988-03-01	
USA-31	1988-09-02	1988-077A	ELINT	Titan 34D / Transtage	Chalet	Failed	Placed in useless orbit due to Transtage malfunction
USA-32	1988-09-05	1988-078A	ELINT	Titan 23G	Singleton/SBWASS-R		Fragmentation on 2026-09-13
USA-33	1988-11-06	1988-099A	Reconnaissance	Titan 34D	KH-11	Out of service	
USA-34	1988-12-02	1988-106B	Radar reconnaissance	Space Shuttle Atlantis	Lacrosse	Deorbited: 1997-03-25	
USA-35	1989-02-14		Navigation	Delta II 6925-9.5	GPS-II-1	Retired: 2000-04-14	
USA-36	1989-03-24			Delta 3920-8	Delta Star	Decayed: 1992-06-23	
USA-37	1989-05-10	1989-035A	ELINT	Titan 34D / Transtage	Chalet	Out of service	
USA-38	1989-06-10		Navigation	Delta II 6925-9.5	GPS-II-2	Out of service	
USA-39	1989-06-14		Missile detection	Titan IV / IUS	DSP-1-14 F14	Decommissioned	Launched on the maiden flight of the Titan IV
USA-40	1989-08-08	1989-061B	Communications	Space Shuttle Columbia	SDS-2		Launched with USA-41
USA-41	1989-08-08	1989-061C	ELINT	Space Shuttle Columbia	SSF/COBRA BRASS	Decayed: 1989-12-31	Launched with USA-40
USA-42	1989-08-18		Navigation	Delta II 6925-9.5	GPS-II-3	Out of service	
USA-43	1989-09-04		Communications	Titan 34D / Transtage	DSCS-III-06		Launched with USA-44
USA-44	1989-09-04		Communications	Titan 34D / Transtage	DSCS-III-07		Launched with USA-43
USA-45	1989-09-06	1989-072A	ELINT	Titan 23G	Singleton/SBWASS-R	Failed	Failed to leave parking orbit due to on-board propulsion malfunction
USA-46	1989-09-25		Communications	Atlas G	Fltsatcom-8		
USA-47	1989-10-21		Navigation	Delta II 6925-9.5	GPS-II-4	Out of service	
USA-48	1989-11-23	1989-090B	ELINT	Space Shuttle Discovery	Magnum		
USA-49	1989-12-11		Navigation	Delta II 6925-9.5	GPS-II-5	Out of service	
USA-50	1990-01-24		Navigation	Delta II 6925-9.5	GPS-II-6	Out of service	
USA-51	1990-02-14		Technology	Delta II 6920-8	LACE/Losat-L	Decayed: 2000-05-24	Launched with USA-52
USA-52	1990-02-14		Technology	Delta II 6920-8	RME/Losat-R	Decayed: 1992-05-24	Launched with USA-51
USA-53	1990-02-28	1990-019B	Reconnaissance	Space Shuttle Atlantis	Misty	Presumed deorbited	Stealth satellite. Last sighting in 1997.
USA-54	1990-03-26		Navigation	Delta II 6925-9.5	GPS-II-7	Failed: 1996-05-21	Signal anomaly made satellite unusable
USA-55	1990-04-05	1990-028B	Communications	Pegasus	GLOMR-2/SECS/TERCEL		
USA-56	1990-04-11		Technology	Atlas E/F	P87-2/Stacksat/POGS/SSR	Out of service	Launched with USA-57 and 58
USA-57	1990-04-11		Technology	Atlas E/F	P87-2/Stacksat/TEX	Out of service	Launched with USA-56 and 58
USA-58	1990-04-11		Technology	Atlas E/F	P87-2/Stacksat/SCE	Out of service	Launched with USA-56 and 57
USA-59	1990-06-08	1990-050A	ELINT / Ocean surveillance	Titan IV	NOSS-2		Deployed subsatellites, USA-60, 61 and 62
USA-60	1990-06-08	1990-050B	ELINT / Ocean surveillance	Titan IV	NOSS-2		Subsatellite of USA-59
USA-61	1990-06-08	1990-050C	ELINT / Ocean surveillance	Titan IV	NOSS-2		Subsatellite of USA-59
USA-62	1990-06-08	1990-050D	ELINT / Ocean surveillance	Titan IV	NOSS-2		Subsatellite of USA-59
USA-63	1990-08-02		Navigation	Delta II 6925-9.5	GPS-II-8	Out of service	
USA-64	1990-10-01		Navigation	Delta II 6925-9.5	GPS-II-9	Out of service	
USA-65	1990-11-13		Missile detection	Titan IV / IUS	DSP-1-14 F15	Decommissioned	
USA-66	1990-11-26		Navigation	Delta II 7925-9.5	GPS-IIA-1	Out of service	
USA-67	1990-11-15	1990-097B	Communications	Space Shuttle Atlantis	SDS-2		Launched with Prowler; disguised as Magnum to hide Prowler's existence
USA-68	1990-12-01		Weather	Atlas E/F	DMSP-5D2 F5 (S-10)	Failed	Placed in useless orbit due to upper stage malfunction
USA-69	1991-03-08	1991-017A	Radar reconnaissance	Titan IV	Lacrosse	Out of service	
USA-70	1991-04-28	1991-031C	Technology development	Space Shuttle Discovery	MPEC		
USA-71	1991-07-04		Navigation	Delta II 7925-9.5	GPS-IIA-2	Out of service	
USA-72	1991-11-08	1991-076A	ELINT / Ocean surveillance	Titan IV	NOSS-2		Deployed subsatellites, USA-74, 76 and 77
USA-73	1991-11-28		Weather	Atlas E/F	DMSP-5D2 F6 (S-12)		
USA-74	1991-11-08	1991-076C	ELINT / Ocean surveillance	Titan IV	NOSS-2		Subsatellite of USA-72
USA-75	1991-11-24		Missile detection	Space Shuttle Atlantis	DSP-1-14-F16		
USA-76	1991-11-08	1991-076D	ELINT / Ocean surveillance	Titan IV	NOSS-2		Subsatellite of USA-72
USA-77	1991-11-08	1991-076E	ELINT / Ocean surveillance	Titan IV	NOSS-2		Subsatellite of USA-72
USA-78	1992-02-11		Communications	Atlas II	DSCS-III-08		
USA-79	1992-02-23		Navigation	Delta II 7925-9.5	GPS-IIA-3	Decommissioned	
USA-80	1992-04-10		Navigation	Delta II 7925-9.5	GPS-IIA-4	Out of service	
USA-81	1992-04-25	1992-023A	ELINT	Titan 23G	Singleton/SBWASS-R		
USA-82	1992-07-02		Communications	Atlas II	DSCS-III-09		
USA-83	1992-07-07		Navigation	Delta II 7925-9.5	GPS-IIA-5	Out of service	
USA-84	1992-09-09		Navigation	Delta II 7925-9.5	GPS-IIA-6	Out of service	
USA-85	1992-11-22		Navigation	Delta II 7925-9.5	GPS-IIA-7	Out of service	
USA-86	1992-11-28	1992-083A	Optical reconnaissance	Titan IV	KH-11		
USA-87	1992-12-18		Navigation	Delta II 7925-9.5	GPS-IIA-8	Out of service	
USA-88	1993-02-03		Navigation	Delta II 7925-9.5	GPS-IIA-9	Out of service	
USA-89	1992-12-02	1992-086B	Communications	Space Shuttle Discovery	SDS-2		
USA-90	1993-03-30		Navigation	Delta II 7925-9.5	GPS-IIA-10	Out of service	
USA-91	1993-05-13		Navigation	Delta II 7925-9.5	GPS-IIA-11	Out of service	
USA-92	1993-06-26		Navigation	Delta II 7925-9.5	GPS-IIA-12	Out of service	
USA-93	1993-07-19		Communications	Atlas II	DSCS-III-10		
USA-94	1993-08-30		Navigation	Delta II 7925-9.5	GPS-IIA-13	Out of service	
USA-95	1993-09-03		Communications	Atlas I	UHF F/O-2		
USA-96	1993-10-26		Navigation	Delta II 7925-9.5	GPS-IIA-14	Out of service	
USA-97	1993-11-28		Communications	Atlas II	DSCS-III-11		
USA-98	1993-12-08		Communications	Delta II 7925	NATO-4B		
USA-99	1994-02-07		Communications	Titan IV / Centaur	Milstar-DFS-1		
USA-100	1994-03-10		Navigation	Delta II 7925-9.5	GPS-IIA-15	Out of service	
USA-101	1994-03-13		Technology development	Taurus	STEP-0		Launched with USA-102
USA-102	1994-03-13		Technology development	Taurus	DarpaSat		Launched with USA-101
USA-103	1994-05-03	1994-026A	ELINT	Titan IV / Centaur	Trumpet		
USA-104	1994-06-24		Communications	Atlas I	UHF F/O-3		
USA-105	1994-08-27	1994-054A	ELINT	Titan IV / Centaur	Mercury		
USA-106	1994-08-29		Weather	Atlas E/F	DMSP 5D-1 F12		
USA-107	1994-12-22		Missile detection	Titan IV / IUS	DSP-1 F17	Active	
USA-108	1995-01-29		Communications	Atlas II	UHF F/O-4		
USA-109	1995-03-24		Weather	Atlas E/F	DMSP 5D-1 F13	Destroyed: 2015-02-03	Exploded after unknown malfunction, characterized as "sudden temperature spike". 47 tracked pieces of debris were produced.
USA-110	1995-05-14	1995-022A	SIGINT	Titan IV / Centaur	Mentor		
USA-111	1995-05-31		Communications	Atlas II	UHF F/O-5	Decommissioned	
USA-112	1995-07-10	1995-034A	ELINT	Titan IV / Centaur	Trumpet		
USA-113	1995-07-31		Communications	Atlas IIA	DSCS-III-B7	Decommissioned	Retired on 9 December 2022.
USA-114	1995-10-22		Communications	Atlas II	UHF F/O-6		
USA-115	1995-11-06		Communications	Titan IV / Centaur	Milstar DFS-2		
USA-116	1995-12-05	1995-066A	Optical reconnaissance	Titan IV	KH-11	Presumed deorbited	not seen since late 2008
USA-117	1996-03-28		Navigation	Delta II 7925-9.5	GPS-IIA-16	Out of service	
USA-118	1996-04-24	1996-026A	ELINT	Titan IV / Centaur	Mercury		
USA-119	1996-05-12	1996-029D	ELINT / Ocean surveillance	Titan IV	NOSS-2		Deployed subsatellites, USA-120, 121 and 122, Launched with USA-123 and 124
USA-120	1996-05-12	1996-029B	ELINT / Ocean surveillance	Titan IV	NOSS-2		Subsatellite of USA-119
USA-121	1996-05-12	1996-029C	ELINT / Ocean surveillance	Titan IV	NOSS-2		Subsatellite of USA-119
USA-122	1996-05-12	1996-029A	ELINT / Ocean surveillance	Titan IV	NOSS-2		Subsatellite of USA-119
USA-123	1996-05-12	1996-029E	Technology	Titan IV	TIPS-Ralph		Launched with USA-119 and subsatellites, and USA-124
USA-124	1996-05-12	1996-029F	Technology	Titan IV	TIPS-Norton		Launched with USA-119 and subsatellites, and USA-123
USA-125	1996-07-03	1996-038A	Communications	Titan IV	SDS-2		
USA-126	1996-07-16		Navigation	Delta II 7925-9.5	GPS-IIA-17	Decommissioned	
USA-127	1996-07-25		Communications	Atlas II	UHF F/O-7		
USA-128	1996-09-12		Navigation	Delta II 7925-9.5	GPS-IIA-18	Out of service	
USA-129	1996-12-20	1996-072A	Optical reconnaissance	Titan IV	412 (KH-11)	Out of service	
USA-130	1997-02-23		Missile detection	Titan IVB/IUS	DSP-1-18 F18	Out of service	
USA-131	1997-04-04		Weather	Titan 23G	DMSP 5D-2 F14		
USA-132	1997-07-23		Navigation	Delta II 7925-9.5	GPS-IIR-2	Active	
USA-133	1997-10-24	1997-064A	Radar reconnaissance	Titan IV	NROL-3 (Lacrosse)	Active	
USA-134	1997-10-25		Communications	Atlas IIA	DSCS-III-B13		Launched with FalconSat-Gold
USA-135	1997-11-06		Navigation	Delta II 7925-9.5	GPS-IIA-19	Out of service	
USA-136	1997-11-06	1997-068A	ELINT	Titan IV / Centaur	NROL-4 (Trumpet)		
USA-137	1998-01-29	1998-005A	Communications	Atlas IIA	NROL-5 (SDS-3)		Capricorn
USA-138	1998-03-15		Communications	Atlas II	UHF F/O-8		
USA-139	1998-05-09	1998-029A	SIGINT	Titan IV / Centaur	NROL-6 (Mentor)		
USA-140	1998-10-20		Communications	Atlas IIA	UHF F/O-9		
USA-141	1998-10-03		Debris	Taurus	ATEX	Failed: 1999-01-16	Debris from STEX (NROL-8) satellite tether experiment
USA-142	1999-04-09		Missile detection	Titan IVB/IUS	DSP-1-18 F19	Failed: 1999-04-09	IUS failed to separate Left in useless orbit
USA-143	1999-04-30		Communications	Titan IV / Centaur	Milstar DFS-3m	Failed: 1999-04-30	Centaur programming error resulted in incorrect burn times, placed in useless orbit
USA-144	1999-05-22	1999-028A	Reconnaissance	Titan IV	NROL-9 (Misty)	Unknown	Stealth satellite, only object ever placed in orbit which amateurs are unable to track
USA-145	1999-10-07		Navigation	Delta II 7925-9.5	GPS-IIR-3		
USA-146	1999-11-23		Communications	Atlas IIA	UHF F/O-10		
USA-147	1999-12-12		Weather	Titan 23G	DMSP 5D-3 F15		
USA-148	2000-01-21		Communications	Atlas IIA	DSCS-III-B8		
USA-149	2000-05-08		Missile detection	Titan IVB/IUS	DSP-1-18 F20	Active	
USA-150	2000-05-11		Navigation	Delta II 7925-9.5	GPS-IIR-4		
USA-151	2000-07-16		Navigation	Delta II 7925-9.5	GPS-IIR-5		
USA-152	2000-08-17	2000-047A	Radar reconnaissance	Titan IVB	NROL-11 (Lacrosse/Onyx)	Active	
USA-153	2000-10-20		Communications	Atlas IIA	DSCS-III-B11		
USA-154	2000-11-10		Navigation	Delta II 7925-9.5	GPS-IIR-6	Decommissioned	
USA-155	2000-12-06	2000-080A	Communications	Atlas IIAS	NROL-10 (SDS-3)		Ursa Major/Great Bear
USA-156	2001-01-30		Navigation	Delta II 7925-9.5	GPS-IIR-7		
USA-157	2001-02-27		Communications	Titan IV / Centaur	Milstar DFS-4		
USA-158	2001-05-18		Technology / Communications	Delta II 7925-9.5	NROL-17 (GeoLITE)		
USA-159	2001-08-06		Missile detection	Titan IVB/IUS	DSP-1-18 F21	Active	
USA-160	2001-09-08	2001-040A	ELINT / Ocean surveillance	Atlas IIAS	NROL-13 (NOSS-3 "Intruder")		Gemini; two satellites sharing one designation
USA-161	2001-10-05	2001-044A	Optical reconnaissance	Titan IVB	NROL-14 (KH-11)	Active	
USA-162	2001-10-11	2001-046A	Communications	Atlas IIAS	NROL-2 (SDS-3)		Aquilla
USA-163	N/A		N/A	N/A	N/A		Number not assigned. Some designation confusion due to contemporary flights with multiple payloads.
USA-164	2002-01-16		Communications	Titan IV / Centaur	Milstar DFS-5		
USA-165	2005-04-11		Technology development	Minotaur	XSS-11		
USA-166	2003-01-29		Navigation	Delta II 7925-9.5	GPS-IIR-8		
USA-167	2003-03-11		Communications	Delta IV M	DSCS-III-A3		
USA-168	2003-03-31		Navigation	Delta II 7925-9.5	GPS-IIR-9		
USA-169	2003-04-08		Communications	Titan IV / Centaur	Milstar DFS-6		
USA-170	2003-08-29		Communications	Delta IV M	DSCS-III-B6		
USA-171	2003-09-09	2003-041A	SIGINT	Titan IV / Centaur	NROL-19 (Mentor)		
USA-172	2003-10-18		Weather	Titan 23G	DMSP 5D-3 F16		
USA-173	2003-12-02	2003-054A	ELINT / Ocean surveillance	Atlas IIAS	NROL-18 (NOSS-3 "Intruder")		Libra; two satellites sharing one designation
USA-174	2003-12-18		Communications	Atlas IIIB	UHF F/O-11		
USA-175	2003-12-21		Navigation	Delta II 7925-9.5	GPS-IIR-10		
USA-176	2004-02-14		Missile detection	Titan IVB/IUS	DSP-1-18 F22	Active	
USA-177	2004-03-20		Navigation	Delta II 7925-9.5	GPS-IIR-11		
USA-178	2004-06-23		Navigation	Delta II 7925-9.5	GPS-IIR-12		
USA-179	2004-08-31	2004-034A	Communications	Atlas IIAS	NROL-1 (SDS-3)		Nemesis
USA-180	2004-11-06		Navigation	Delta II 7925-9.5	GPS-IIR-13		
USA-181	2005-02-03	2005-004A	ELINT / Ocean surveillance	Atlas IIIB	NROL-23 (NOSS-3 "Intruder")		Canis Minor; two satellites sharing one designation
USA-182	2005-04-30	2005-016A	Radar reconnaissance	Titan IVB	NROL-16 (Lacrosse/Onyx)	Active	
USA-183	2005-09-26		Navigation	Delta II 7925-9.5	GPS-IIR-14 (IIRM-1)		
USA-184	2006-06-25	2006-027A	ELINT	Delta IV M+(4,2)	NROL-22 (Imp. Trumpet)		
USA-185	2005-09-23		Technology development	Minotaur	STP-R1		
USA-186	2005-10-19	2005-042A	Optical reconnaissance	Titan IVB	NROL-20 (KH-11)	Active	
USA-187	2006-06-21	2006-024A	Technology	Delta II 7925	MiTEx-A		Launched with USA-188 and 189
USA-188	2006-06-21	2006-024B	Technology	Delta II 7925	MiTEx-B		Launched with USA-187 and 189
USA-189	2006-06-21	2006-024C	Technology	Delta II 7925	MiTEx Carrier		Launched with USA-187 and 188
USA-190	2006-09-25		Navigation	Delta II 7925-9.5	GPS-IIR-15 (IIRM-2)	Active	
USA-191	2006-11-04		Weather	Delta IV M	DMSP 5D-3 F17		
USA-192	2006-11-17		Navigation	Delta II 7925-9.5	GPS-IIR-16 (IIRM-3)	Active	
USA-193	2006-12-14	2006-057A	Radar Imaging	Delta II 7920-10	NROL-21	Failed: 2006-12-14; Destroyed: 2008-02-21	Failed immediately after separation from rocket. Destroyed by ASAT.
USA-194	2007-06-15	2007-027A	ELINT / Ocean surveillance	Atlas V 401	NROL-30 (NOSS-3 "Intruder")		Pyxis; two satellites under one designation
USA-195	2007-10-11		Communications	Atlas V 421	WGS-1		
USA-196	2007-10-17		Navigation	Delta II 7925-9.5	GPS-IIR-17 (IIRM-4)	Active	
USA-197	2007-11-11		Missile detection	Delta IV Heavy	DSP-1-18 F23	Failed	
USA-198	2007-12-10	2007-060A	Communications	Atlas V 401	NROL-24 (SDS-3)		Scorpius
USA-199	2007-12-20		Navigation	Delta II 7925-9.5	GPS-IIR-18 (IIRM-5)	Active	
USA-200	2008-03-13	2008-010A	ELINT	Atlas V 411	NROL-28 (Imp. Trumpet)		
USA-201	2008-03-15		Navigation	Delta II 7925-9.5	GPS-IIR-19 (IIRM-6)	Active	
USA-202	2009-01-18	2009-001A	SIGINT	Delta IV Heavy	NROL-26 (Mentor)	Active	
USA-203	2009-03-24		Navigation	Delta II 7925-9.5	GPS-IIR-20 (IIRM-7)	Active	
USA-204	2009-04-04		Communications	Atlas V 421	WGS-2	Active	
USA-205	2009-05-05		Technology	Delta II 7920-10C	STSS-ATRR	Active	
USA-206	2009-08-17		Navigation	Delta II 7925-9.5	GPS IIR-21 (IIRM-8)	Active	Final GPS IIR satellite
USA-207	2009-09-08		SIGINT	Atlas V 401	Palladium At Night (PAN)	Active?	First NEMESIS satellite
USA-208	2009-09-25		Technology	Delta II 7920-10C	STSS-Demo	Decommissioned	Launched with USA-209
USA-209	2009-09-25		Technology	Delta II 7920-10C	STSS-Demo	Decommissioned	Launched with USA-208
USA-210	2009-10-18		Weather	Atlas V 401	DMSP-5D-3 F18	Active	
USA-211	2009-12-06		Communications	Delta IV M+(5,4)	WGS-3	Active	Last Block I WGS satellite
USA-212	2010-04-22		Technology	Atlas V 501	Boeing X-37B OTV-1	Landed: 2010-12-03	Experimental spaceplane, maiden flight of first X-37B
USA-213	2010-05-28		Navigation	Delta IV M+(4,2)	GPS IIF-1	Active	
USA-214	2010-08-14		Communications	Atlas V 531	AEHF-1	Active	
USA-215	2010-09-21	2010-046A	Radar reconnaissance	Atlas V 501	NROL-41 (FIA-R)	Active	
USA-216	2010-09-26		Satellite tracking	Minotaur IV	SBSS-1	Active	
USA-217	2010-11-20		Technology	Minotaur IV / HAPS	STPSat-1	Active	Launched with USA-218, 219, 220, 221, 222 and NanoSail-D2
USA-218	2010-11-20		Science	Minotaur IV / HAPS	RAX	Active	Launched with USA-217, 219, 220, 221, 222 and NanoSail-D2. Civilian satellite, unclear why USA designation was assigned
USA-219	2010-11-20		Technology	Minotaur IV / HAPS	O/OREOS	Active	Launched with USA-217, 218, 220, 221, 222 and NanoSail-D2. Civilian satellite, unclear why USA designation was assigned
USA-220	2010-11-20		Technology demonstration	Minotaur IV / HAPS	FASTSAT	Active	Launched with USA-217, 218, 219, 221, 222 and NanoSail-D2. Civilian satellite, unclear why USA designation was assigned
USA-221	2010-11-20		Technology	Minotaur IV / HAPS	FalconSAT-5	Active	Launched with USA-217, 218, 219, 220, 222 and NanoSail-D2
USA-222	2010-11-20		Technology	Minotaur IV / HAPS	FASTRAC	Active	Launched with USA-217, 218, 219, 220, 221 and NanoSail-D2. Two civilian satellites, unclear why USA designation was assigned
USA-223	2010-11-21	2010-063A	SIGINT	Delta IV Heavy	NROL-32 (Mentor)	Active	
USA-224	2011-01-20	2011-002A	Optical reconnaissance	Delta IV Heavy	NROL-49 (KH-11 Kennen)	Active	
USA-225	2011-02-06	2011-006A	Technology	Minotaur I	NROL-66 (Rapid Pathfinder Prototype)	Active	
USA-226	2011-03-05		Technology	Atlas V 501	Boeing X-37B OTV-2	Landed: 2012-06-16	Spaceplane, maiden flight of second X-37B
USA-227	2011-03-11	2011-011A	Communications	Delta IV M+(4,2)	NROL-27 (SDS-3)	Active	
USA-228	2010-11-20		Technology	Minotaur IV/HAPS	FASTRAC	Active	This is the second of the pair of FASTRAC satellites, the first one being USA-222
USA-229	2011-04-15	2011-014A	ELINT / Ocean surveillance	Atlas V 411	NROL-34 (NOSS-3 "Intruder")	Active	Odin; two satellites sharing one designation
USA-230	2011-05-07		Missile detection	Atlas V 401	SBIRS GEO-1	Active	
USA-231	2011-06-30	2011-029A	Optical reconnaissance	Minotaur I	ORS-1	Active	
USA-232	2011-07-16		Navigation	Delta IV M+(4,2)	GPS IIF-2	Active	
USA-233	2012-01-20		Communications	Delta IV M+(5,4)	WGS-4	Active	
USA-234	2012-04-03	2012-014A	Radar reconnaissance	Delta IV M+(5,2)	NROL-25 (FIA-R)	Active	
USA-235	2012-05-04		Communications	Atlas V 531	AEHF-2	Active	
USA-236	2012-06-20	2012-033A	Communications	Atlas V 401	NROL-38 (SDS-3)	Active	
USA-237	2012-06-29	2012-034A	SIGINT	Delta IV Heavy	NROL-15 (Imp. Mentor)	Active	
USA-238	2012-09-13	2012-048A	ELINT / Ocean surveillance	Atlas V 401	NROL-36 (NOSS-3 "Intruder")	Active	Rosie; two satellites sharing one designation
USA-239	2012-10-04		Navigation	Delta IV M+(4,2)	GPS IIF-3	Active	
USA-240	2012-12-11		Technology	Atlas V 501	Boeing X-37B OTV-3	Landed: 2014-10-17	
USA-241	2013-03-19		Missile detection	Atlas V 401	SBIRS GEO-2	Active	
USA-242	2013-05-15		Navigation	Atlas V 401	GPS IIF-4	Active	
USA-243	2013-05-25		Communications	Delta IV M+(5,4)	WGS-5	Active	
USA-244	2013-08-08		Communications	Delta IV M+(5,4)	WGS-6	Active	
USA-245	2013-08-28	2013-043A	Optical reconnaissance	Delta IV Heavy	NROL-65 (KH-11 Kennen)	Active	
USA-246	2013-09-18		Communications	Atlas V 531	AEHF-3	Active	
USA-247	2013-12-06	2013-072A	Radar reconnaissance	Atlas V 501	NROL-39 (FIA-R)	Active	
USA-248	2014-02-21		Navigation	Delta IV M+(4,2)	GPS IIF-5	Active	
USA-249	2014-04-03		Weather	Atlas V 401	DMSP-5D-3 F19	Inactive	
USA-250	2014-04-10	2014-020A	ELINT	Atlas V 541	NROL-67	Active	
USA-251	2014-05-17		Navigation	Delta IV M+(4,2)	GPS IIF-6	Active	
USA-252	2014-05-22	2014-027A	Communications	Atlas V 401	NROL-33 (SDS-3)	Active	
USA-253	2014-07-28	2014-043A	Surveillance	Delta IV M+(4,2)	GSSAP 1	Active	Launched with USA-254 and USA-255
USA-254	2014-07-28	2014-043B	Surveillance	Delta IV M+(4,2)	GSSAP 2	Out of service	Launched with USA-253 and USA-255
USA-255	2014-07-28	2014-043C	Technology	Delta IV M+(4,2)	ANGELS	Out of service	Launched with USA-253 and USA-254
USA-256	2014-08-02		Navigation	Atlas V 401	GPS IIF-7	Active	
USA-257	2014-09-17		ELINT	Atlas V 401	CLIO	Active	
USA-258	2014-10-29		Navigation	Atlas V 401	GPS IIF-8	Active	
USA-259	2014-12-13	2014-081A	ELINT	Atlas V 401	NROL-35	Active	
USA-260	2015-03-25		Navigation	Delta IV M+(4,2)	GPS IIF-9	Active	
USA-261	2015-05-20		Technology	Atlas V 501	Boeing X-37B OTV-4	Landed: 2017-05-07	
USA-262	2015-07-15		Navigation	Atlas V 401	GPS IIF-10	Active	
USA-263	2015-07-24		Military communications	Delta IV M+ (5,4)	WGS-7	Active	
USA-264	2015-10-08	2015-058A	ELINT / Ocean surveillance	Atlas V 401	NROL-55 (NOSS-3 "Intruder")	Active	Two satellites sharing one designation. Also contained 13 CubeSats as part of the Government Rideshare Advanced Concepts Experiment (GRACE) Program.
USA-265	2015-10-31		Navigation	Atlas V 401	GPS IIF-11	Active	
USA-266	2016-02-05		Navigation	Atlas V 401	GPS IIF-12	Active	
USA-267	2016-02-10	2016-010A	Radar reconnaissance	Delta IV M+(5,2)	NROL-45 (FIA-R)	Active	
USA-268	2016-06-11	2016-036A	SIGINT	Delta IV Heavy	NROL-37 (Orion / Mentor)	Active	
USA-269	2016-07-28	2016-047A	Communications	Atlas V 421	NROL-61 (Quasar, Spike)	Active	
USA-270	2016-08-19	2016-052A	Surveillance	Delta IV M+(4,2)	GSSAP 3	Active	Launched with USA-271
USA-271	2016-08-19	2016-052B	Surveillance	Delta IV M+(4,2)	GSSAP 4	Active	Launched with USA-270
USA-272	2016-12-07		Military communications	Delta IV M+ (5,4)	WGS-8	Active	
USA-273	2017-01-21		Missile detection	Atlas V 401	SBIRS GEO-3	Commissioning	
USA-274	2017-03-01	2017-011A	ELINT / Ocean surveillance	Atlas V 401	NROL-79 (NOSS-3 "Intruder")	Active	Two satellites sharing one designation.
USA-275	2017-03-19		Military communications	Delta IV M+ (5,4)	WGS-9	Active	
USA-276	2017-05-01	2017-022A	Radar Imaging	Falcon 9 Full Thrust	NROL-76	Active	Reimbursement for USA-193, Military Satellite. The so-called "Radar Imaging", which had a serious flaw and was the US Army, shot down. Destroyed: 21 Feb 2008.
USA-277	2017-09-07		Technology	Falcon 9 Block 4	Boeing X-37B OTV-5	Landed: 2019-10-27	
USA-278	2017-09-24	2017-056A	ELINT	Atlas V 541	NROL-42 (Trumpet)	Active	
USA-279	2017-10-15	2017-066A	Communications	Atlas V 421	NROL-52 (Quasar)	Active	
USA-280	2018-01-08	2018-001A	Classified	Falcon 9 Block 4	Zuma	Presumably failed	Launch reported as successful, but satellite believed to have been lost after failing to separate from payload adapter.
USA-281	2018-01-12	2018-005A	Radar reconnaissance	Delta IV M+(5,2)	NROL-47 (FIA-R)	Active	
USA-282	2018-01-20		Missile detection	Atlas V 411	SBIRS GEO-4	Active	
USA-283	2018-04-14		Communications	Atlas V 551	AFSPC-11 / CBAS	Active	Payload carrier which deployed USA-283 to USA-287 experiments
USA-284	2018-04-14	2018-036B	Technology demonstration	Atlas V 551	AFSPC-11 / EAGLE	Active	Payload carrier which deployed USA-283 to USA-287 experiments
USA-285	2018-04-14	2018-036E	Technology demonstration	Atlas V 551	AFSPC-11 / EAGLE	Active	Payload carrier which deployed USA-283 to USA-287 experiments
USA-286	2018-04-14	2018-036F	Technology demonstration	Atlas V 551	AFSPC-11 / EAGLE	Active	Payload carrier which deployed USA-283 to USA-287 experiments
USA-287	2018-04-14	2018-036G	Technology demonstration	Atlas V 551	AFSPC-11 / EAGLE	Active	Payload carrier which deployed USA-283 to USA-287 experiments
USA-288	2018-10-17		Communications	Atlas V 551	AEHF-4	Active	
USA-289	2018-12-23		Navigation	Falcon 9 Block 5	GPS III-SV01	Active	First GPS Block III satellite, named Vespucci
USA-290	2019-01-19	2019-004A	Optical reconnaissance	Delta IV Heavy	NROL-71 (KH-11 Kennen)	Active	
USA-291	2019-03-15		Military communications	Delta IV M+ (5,4)	WGS-10	Active	
USA-292	2019-08-08		Communications	Atlas V 551	AEHF-5	Active	TDO-1 cubesat deployed
USA-293	2019-08-22		Navigation	Delta IV	GPS III-SV02	Active	Second GPS Block III satellite, named Magellan
USA-294	2020-01-31	2020-007A	Classified	Electron	NROL-151	Unknown	
USA-295	2017-09-07	2017-052C	Classified	Falcon 9	Unknown	Unknown	Cubesat deployed by Boeing X-37 spaceplane. Unannounced until 2020.
USA-296	2017-09-07	2017-052D	Classified	Falcon 9	Unknown	Unknown	Cubesat deployed by Boeing X-37 spaceplane.
USA-297	2017-09-07	2017-052E	Classified	Falcon 9	Unknown	Unknown	Cubesat deployed by Boeing X-37 spaceplane.
USA-298	2020-03-26		Communications	Atlas V 551	AEHF-6	Testing	TDO-2 cubesat deployed
USA-299	2020-05-17		Technology	Atlas V 501	Boeing X-37B OTV-6 (USSF-7)	Landed: 2022-11-12	
USA-300	2020-05-17	2020-029B		Atlas V 501	FalconSAT-8		Cubesat deployed by Boeing X-37B spaceplane.
USA-301	2020-06-13	2020-037A	Classified	Electron	RASR-2		
USA-302	2020-06-13	2020-037B	Classified	Electron	RASR-2		
USA-303	2020-06-13	2020-037C	Classified	Electron	RASR-2		
USA-304	2020-06-30		Navigation	Falcon 9 Block 5	GPS III-SV03	Active	Third GPS Block III satellite, named Matthew Henson
USA-305	2020-07-15	2020-046A		Minotaur IV / Orion 38	NROL-129		
USA-306	2020-07-15	2020-046B		Minotaur IV / Orion 38	NROL-129		
USA-307	2020-07-15	2020-046C		Minotaur IV / Orion 38	NROL-129		
USA-308	2020-07-15	2020-046D		Minotaur IV / Orion 38	NROL-129		
USA-309	2020-11-05		Navigation	Falcon 9 Block 5	GPS III-SV04		Fourth GPS Block III satellite, named Sacagawea
USA-310	2020-11-13	2020-083A		Atlas V 531	NROL-101		
USA-311	2020-12-10	2020-095A	SIGINT	Delta IV Heavy	NROL-44 (mentor)		
USA-312	2020-12-19	2020-101A		Falcon 9 Block 5	NROL-108		Launched with USA-313, possibly SpaceX Starshield prototype.
USA-313	2020-12-19	2020-101B		Falcon 9 Block 5	NROL-108		Launched with USA-312, possibly SpaceX Starshield prototype.
USA-314	2021-04-26	2021-032A	Optical reconnaissance	Delta IV Heavy	NROL-82 (EIS)	Entered service, presumed active	Sun-synchronous orbit
USA-315	2021-05-18		Early warning	Atlas V 421	SBIRS GEO-5	Entered service, presumed active	
USA-316	2021-06-15	2021-052A	Reconnaissance	Minotaur I	NROL-111	Entered service, presumed active	Launched with USA-317 and USA-318
USA-317	2021-06-15	2021-052B	Reconnaissance	Minotaur I	NROL-111	Entered service, presumed active	Launched with USA-316 and USA-318
USA-318	2021-06-15	2021-052C	Reconnaissance	Minotaur I	NROL-111	Entered service, presumed active	Launched with USA-316 and USA-317
USA-319	2021-06-17		Navigation	Falcon 9 Block 5	GPS III-SV05		Fifth GPS Block III satellite, named Neil Armstrong
USA-320	2022-01-13	2022-002CV		Falcon 9 Block 5	Unknown		Launched with USA-321, USA-322 and USA-323 on Transporter 3 Rideshare Launch. Likely the satellites were built by SpaceX based on the Starshield bus (based on Starlink Block v1.5 technology), were deployed by the US army. Their purpose has not been revealed, but is likely either technical demonstration, communications, earth observation or signals intelligence.
USA-321	2022-01-13	2022-002CX		Falcon 9 Block 5	Unknown	Decayed: 2023-04-01	Launched with USA-320, USA-322 and USA-323 on Transporter 3 Rideshare Launch. Likely the satellites were built by SpaceX based on the Starshield bus (based on Starlink Block v1.5 technology), were deployed by the US army. Their purpose has not been revealed, but is likely either technical demonstration, communications, earth observation or signals intelligence.
USA-322	2022-01-13	2022-002CY		Falcon 9 Block 5	Unknown	Decayed: 2023-04-02	Launched with USA-320, USA-321 and USA-323 on Transporter 3 Rideshare Launch. Likely the satellites were built by SpaceX based on the Starshield bus (based on Starlink Block v1.5 technology), were deployed by the US army. Their purpose has not been revealed, but is likely either technical demonstration, communications, earth observation or signals intelligence.
USA-323	2022-01-13	2022-002CZ		Falcon 9 Block 5	Unknown	Decayed: 2023-04-02	Launched with USA-320, USA-321 and USA-322 on Transporter 3 Rideshare Launch. Likely the satellites were built by SpaceX based on the Starshield bus (based on Starlink Block v1.5 technology), were deployed by the US army. Their purpose has not been revealed, but is likely either technical demonstration, communications, earth observation or signals intelligence.
USA-324	2022-01-21	2022-006A	Space surveillance	Atlas V 511	GSSAP 5 (Hornet 5)	Active	Launched with USA-325
USA-325	2022-01-21	2022-006B	Space surveillance	Atlas V 511	GSSAP 6 (Hornet 6)	Active	Launched with USA-324
USA-326	2022-02-02	2022-009A	Optical reconnaissance	Falcon 9 Block 5	NROL-87	Entered service, presumed active	
USA-327	2022-04-17	2022-040A	ELINT / Ocean surveillance	Falcon 9 Block 5	NROL-85 (NOSS-3 "Intruder")	Entered service, presumed active	
USA-328	2022-06-19	2022-064B		Falcon 9 Block 5	Unknown		Launched with USA-329, USA-330, USA-331 and Globalstar FM15. Likely the satellites were built by SpaceX based on the Starshield bus (based on Starlink Block v1.5 technology), based on the deployment structure seen in the launch video. Their purpose has not been revealed, but is likely either technical demonstration, communications, earth observation or signals intelligence.
USA-329	2022-06-19	2022-064C		Falcon 9 Block 5	Unknown		Launched with USA-328, USA-330, USA-331 and Globalstar FM15. Likely the satellites were built by SpaceX based on the Starshield bus (based on Starlink Block v1.5 technology), based on the deployment structure seen in the launch video. Their purpose has not been revealed, but is likely either technical demonstration, communications, earth observation or signals intelligence.
USA-330	2022-06-19	2022-064D		Falcon 9 Block 5	Unknown		Launched with USA-328, USA-329, USA-331 and Globalstar FM15. Likely the satellites were built by SpaceX based on the Starshield bus (based on Starlink Block v1.5 technology), based on the deployment structure seen in the launch video. Their purpose has not been revealed, but is likely either technical demonstration, communications, earth observation or signals intelligence.
USA-331	2022-06-19	2022-064E		Falcon 9 Block 5	Unknown		Launched with USA-328, USA-329, USA-330 and Globalstar FM15. Likely the satellites were built by SpaceX based on the Starshield bus (based on Starlink Block v1.5 technology), based on the deployment structure seen in the launch video. Their purpose has not been revealed, but is likely either technical demonstration, communications, earth observation or signals intelligence.
USA-332	2022-07-01		Early warning / Technology	Atlas V 541	WFOV (USSF-12)	Active	Launched with USA-333 (USSF-12 Ring)
USA-333	2022-07-01		Experimental	Atlas V 541	USSF-12 Ring	Active	Launched with USA-332. Payload carrier which further deployed USA-337.
USA-334	2022-07-13	2022-079A		Electron	NROL-162 (RASR-3)		
USA-335	2022-08-04	2022-091A		Electron	NROL-199 (RASR-4)		
USA-336	2022-08-04		Early warning	Atlas V 421	SBIRS GEO-6	Entered service, presumed active	
USA-337	2022-07-01	2022-073E		Atlas V 541	Unknown		Launched with USA-332 and USA-333. It was ejected from USSF-12 Ring (USA-333).
USA-338	2022-09-24	2022-117A	Optical reconnaissance	Delta IV Heavy	NROL-91 (KH-11 19)	Entered service, presumed active	spy satellite, has been spotted
USA-339	2022-11-01	2022-144B	Technology demonstration	Falcon Heavy	Shepherd Demonstration	Entered service, presumed active	Launched with LDPE-2, LINUSS-A1/A2, TETRA-1 and Alpine as part of the USSF-44 mission.
USA-340	2022-11-01	2022-144E	Technology demonstration	Falcon Heavy		Entered service, presumed active	Launched with Shepherd Demonstration and LDPE-2 as part of the USSF-44 mission. It was ejected from LDPE-2. TETRA-1 and Alpine are possible matches for this satellite.
USA-341	2022-11-01	2022-144F	Technology demonstration	Falcon Heavy		Entered service, presumed active	Launched with Shepherd Demonstration and LDPE-2 as part of the USSF-44 mission. It was ejected from LDPE-2. TETRA-1 and Alpine are possible matches for this satellite.
USA-342	2023-01-16		Communications	Falcon Heavy	CBAS 2		Launched with LDPE-3A as part of the USSF-67 mission.
USA-343	2023-01-18		Navigation	Falcon 9 Block 5	GPS III-SV06	Active	Sixth GPS Block III satellite, named Amelia Earhart
USA-344	2022-11-01	2022-144J	Technology demonstration	Falcon Heavy	USUVL	Active	Launched with Shepherd Demonstration and LDPE-2 as part of the USSF-44 mission. It separated from one of the other spacecrafts onboard on 9 January 2023.
USA-345	2023-06-22	2023-089A	SIGINT	Delta IV Heavy	NROL-68 (Orion 11)	Active	
USA-346	2023-09-10	2023-140A	Space domain awareness	Atlas V 551	NROL-107 (Silentbarker 1)	Entered service, presumed active	Launched with USA-347 and USA-348.
USA-347	2023-09-10	2023-140B	Space domain awareness	Atlas V 551	NROL-107 (Silentbarker 2)	Entered service, presumed active	Launched with USA-346 and USA-348.
USA-348	2023-09-10	2023-140C	Space domain awareness	Atlas V 551	NROL-107 (Silentbarker 3)	Entered service, presumed active	Launched with USA-346 and USA-347.
USA-349	2023-12-29		Technology	Falcon Heavy	X-37B OTV-7 (USSF-52)	Landed: 2025-03-07	
USA-350	2024-03-19	2024-050W	Communications	Falcon 9 Block 5	Starshield	Active	Launched with USA-351 and Starlink Group 7-16.
USA-351	2024-03-19	2024-050X	Communications	Falcon 9 Block 5	Starshield	Active	Launched with USA-350 and Starlink Group 7-16.
USA-352	2024-03-21	2024-053A	Technology demonstration	Electron	NROL-123 (RASR-5)	Active	
USA-353	2024-04-09	2024-067A	SIGINT	Delta IV Heavy	NROL-70 (Orion 12)	Active	Final Delta IV Heavy launch.
USA-354	2024-05-22	2024-096A	Reconnaissance	Falcon 9 Block 5	NROL-146	Active	Starshield constellation, launched with USA-354 to USA-374.
USA-355	2024-05-22	2024-096B	Reconnaissance	Falcon 9 Block 5	NROL-146	Active	Starshield constellation, launched with USA-354 to USA-374.
USA-356	2024-05-22	2024-096C	Reconnaissance	Falcon 9 Block 5	NROL-146	Active	Starshield constellation, launched with USA-354 to USA-374.
USA-357	2024-05-22	2024-096D	Reconnaissance	Falcon 9 Block 5	NROL-146	Active	Starshield constellation, launched with USA-354 to USA-374.
USA-358	2024-05-22	2024-096E	Reconnaissance	Falcon 9 Block 5	NROL-146	Active	Starshield constellation, launched with USA-354 to USA-374.
USA-359	2024-05-22	2024-096F	Reconnaissance	Falcon 9 Block 5	NROL-146	Active	Starshield constellation, launched with USA-354 to USA-374.
USA-360	2024-05-22	2024-096G	Reconnaissance	Falcon 9 Block 5	NROL-146	Active	Starshield constellation, launched with USA-354 to USA-374.
USA-361	2024-05-22	2024-096H	Reconnaissance	Falcon 9 Block 5	NROL-146	Active	Starshield constellation, launched with USA-354 to USA-374.
USA-362	2024-05-22	2024-096J	Reconnaissance	Falcon 9 Block 5	NROL-146	Active	Starshield constellation, launched with USA-354 to USA-374.
USA-363	2024-05-22	2024-096K	Reconnaissance	Falcon 9 Block 5	NROL-146	Active	Starshield constellation, launched with USA-354 to USA-374.
USA-364	2024-05-22	2024-096L	Reconnaissance	Falcon 9 Block 5	NROL-146	Active	Starshield constellation, launched with USA-354 to USA-374.
USA-365	2024-05-22	2024-096M	Reconnaissance	Falcon 9 Block 5	NROL-146	Active	Starshield constellation, launched with USA-354 to USA-374.
USA-366	2024-05-22	2024-096N	Reconnaissance	Falcon 9 Block 5	NROL-146	Active	Starshield constellation, launched with USA-354 to USA-374.
USA-367	2024-05-22	2024-096P	Reconnaissance	Falcon 9 Block 5	NROL-146	Active	Starshield constellation, launched with USA-354 to USA-374.
USA-368	2024-05-22	2024-096Q	Reconnaissance	Falcon 9 Block 5	NROL-146	Active	Starshield constellation, launched with USA-354 to USA-374.
USA-369	2024-05-22	2024-096R	Reconnaissance	Falcon 9 Block 5	NROL-146	Active	Starshield constellation, launched with USA-354 to USA-374.
USA-370	2024-05-22	2024-096S	Reconnaissance	Falcon 9 Block 5	NROL-146	Active	Starshield constellation, launched with USA-354 to USA-374.
USA-371	2024-05-22	2024-096T	Reconnaissance	Falcon 9 Block 5	NROL-146	Active	Starshield constellation, launched with USA-354 to USA-374.
USA-372	2024-05-22	2024-096U	Reconnaissance	Falcon 9 Block 5	NROL-146	Active	Starshield constellation, launched with USA-354 to USA-374.
USA-373	2024-05-22	2024-096V	Reconnaissance	Falcon 9 Block 5	NROL-146	Active	Starshield constellation, launched with USA-354 to USA-374.
USA-374	2024-05-22	2024-096W	Reconnaissance	Falcon 9 Block 5	NROL-146	Active	Starshield constellation, launched with USA-354 to USA-374.
USA-375	2024-06-29	2024-121A	Reconnaissance	Falcon 9 Block 5	NROL-186	Active	Starshield constellation, launched with USA-375 to USA-395.
USA-376	2024-06-29	2024-121B	Reconnaissance	Falcon 9 Block 5	NROL-186	Active	Starshield constellation, launched with USA-375 to USA-395.
USA-377	2024-06-29	2024-121C	Reconnaissance	Falcon 9 Block 5	NROL-186	Active	Starshield constellation, launched with USA-375 to USA-395.
USA-378	2024-06-29	2024-121D	Reconnaissance	Falcon 9 Block 5	NROL-186	Active	Starshield constellation, launched with USA-375 to USA-395.
USA-379	2024-06-29	2024-121E	Reconnaissance	Falcon 9 Block 5	NROL-186	Active	Starshield constellation, launched with USA-375 to USA-395.
USA-380	2024-06-29	2024-121F	Reconnaissance	Falcon 9 Block 5	NROL-186	Active	Starshield constellation, launched with USA-375 to USA-395.
USA-381	2024-06-29	2024-121G	Reconnaissance	Falcon 9 Block 5	NROL-186	Active	Starshield constellation, launched with USA-375 to USA-395.
USA-382	2024-06-29	2024-121H	Reconnaissance	Falcon 9 Block 5	NROL-186	Active	Starshield constellation, launched with USA-375 to USA-395.
USA-383	2024-06-29	2024-121J	Reconnaissance	Falcon 9 Block 5	NROL-186	Active	Starshield constellation, launched with USA-375 to USA-395.
USA-384	2024-06-29	2024-121K	Reconnaissance	Falcon 9 Block 5	NROL-186	Active	Starshield constellation, launched with USA-375 to USA-395.
USA-385	2024-06-29	2024-121L	Reconnaissance	Falcon 9 Block 5	NROL-186	Active	Starshield constellation, launched with USA-375 to USA-395.
USA-386	2024-06-29	2024-121M	Reconnaissance	Falcon 9 Block 5	NROL-186	Active	Starshield constellation, launched with USA-375 to USA-395.
USA-387	2024-06-29	2024-121N	Reconnaissance	Falcon 9 Block 5	NROL-186	Active	Starshield constellation, launched with USA-375 to USA-395.
USA-388	2024-06-29	2024-121P	Reconnaissance	Falcon 9 Block 5	NROL-186	Active	Starshield constellation, launched with USA-375 to USA-395.
USA-389	2024-06-29	2024-121Q	Reconnaissance	Falcon 9 Block 5	NROL-186	Active	Starshield constellation, launched with USA-375 to USA-395.
USA-390	2024-06-29	2024-121R	Reconnaissance	Falcon 9 Block 5	NROL-186	Active	Starshield constellation, launched with USA-375 to USA-395.
USA-391	2024-06-29	2024-121S	Reconnaissance	Falcon 9 Block 5	NROL-186	Active	Starshield constellation, launched with USA-375 to USA-395.
USA-392	2024-06-29	2024-121T	Reconnaissance	Falcon 9 Block 5	NROL-186	Active	Starshield constellation, launched with USA-375 to USA-395.
USA-393	2024-06-29	2024-121U	Reconnaissance	Falcon 9 Block 5	NROL-186	Active	Starshield constellation, launched with USA-375 to USA-395.
USA-394	2024-06-29	2024-121V	Reconnaissance	Falcon 9 Block 5	NROL-186	Active	Starshield constellation, launched with USA-375 to USA-395.
USA-395	2024-06-29	2024-121W	Reconnaissance	Falcon 9 Block 5	NROL-186	Active	Starshield constellation, launched with USA-375 to USA-395.
USA-396	2024-07-30	2024-134A	TBA	Atlas V 551	USSF-51	Active	
USA-397	2024-07-30	2024-134B	TBA	Atlas V 551	USSF-51	Active	
USA-398	2024-07-30	2024-134C	TBA	Atlas V 551	USSF-51	Active	
USA-399	2022-11-01	2022-144K	Technology demonstration	Falcon Heavy		Entered service, presumed active	Launched with Shepherd Demonstration and LDPE-2 as part of the USSF-44 mission. It was ejected from LDPE-2 in early September 2024.
USA-400	2024-09-06	2024-160A	Reconnaissance	Falcon 9 Block 5	NROL-113	Active	Starshield constellation, launched with USA-400 to USA-420.
USA-401	2024-09-06	2024-160B	Reconnaissance	Falcon 9 Block 5	NROL-113	Active	Starshield constellation, launched with USA-400 to USA-420.
USA-402	2024-09-06	2024-160C	Reconnaissance	Falcon 9 Block 5	NROL-113	Active	Starshield constellation, launched with USA-400 to USA-420.
USA-403	2024-09-06	2024-160D	Reconnaissance	Falcon 9 Block 5	NROL-113	Active	Starshield constellation, launched with USA-400 to USA-420.
USA-404	2024-09-06	2024-160E	Reconnaissance	Falcon 9 Block 5	NROL-113	Active	Starshield constellation, launched with USA-400 to USA-420.
USA-405	2024-09-06	2024-160F	Reconnaissance	Falcon 9 Block 5	NROL-113	Active	Starshield constellation, launched with USA-400 to USA-420.
USA-406	2024-09-06	2024-160G	Reconnaissance	Falcon 9 Block 5	NROL-113	Active	Starshield constellation, launched with USA-400 to USA-420.
USA-407	2024-09-06	2024-160H	Reconnaissance	Falcon 9 Block 5	NROL-113	Active	Starshield constellation, launched with USA-400 to USA-420.
USA-408	2024-09-06	2024-160J	Reconnaissance	Falcon 9 Block 5	NROL-113	Active	Starshield constellation, launched with USA-400 to USA-420.
USA-409	2024-09-06	2024-160K	Reconnaissance	Falcon 9 Block 5	NROL-113	Active	Starshield constellation, launched with USA-400 to USA-420.
USA-410	2024-09-06	2024-160L	Reconnaissance	Falcon 9 Block 5	NROL-113	Active	Starshield constellation, launched with USA-400 to USA-420.
USA-411	2024-09-06	2024-160M	Reconnaissance	Falcon 9 Block 5	NROL-113	Active	Starshield constellation, launched with USA-400 to USA-420.
USA-412	2024-09-06	2024-160N	Reconnaissance	Falcon 9 Block 5	NROL-113	Active	Starshield constellation, launched with USA-400 to USA-420.
USA-413	2024-09-06	2024-160P	Reconnaissance	Falcon 9 Block 5	NROL-113	Active	Starshield constellation, launched with USA-400 to USA-420.
USA-414	2024-09-06	2024-160Q	Reconnaissance	Falcon 9 Block 5	NROL-113	Active	Starshield constellation, launched with USA-400 to USA-420.
USA-415	2024-09-06	2024-160R	Reconnaissance	Falcon 9 Block 5	NROL-113	Active	Starshield constellation, launched with USA-400 to USA-420.
USA-416	2024-09-06	2024-160S	Reconnaissance	Falcon 9 Block 5	NROL-113	Active	Starshield constellation, launched with USA-400 to USA-420.
USA-417	2024-09-06	2024-160T	Reconnaissance	Falcon 9 Block 5	NROL-113	Active	Starshield constellation, launched with USA-400 to USA-420.
USA-418	2024-09-06	2024-160U	Reconnaissance	Falcon 9 Block 5	NROL-113	Active	Starshield constellation, launched with USA-400 to USA-420.
USA-419	2024-09-06	2024-160V	Reconnaissance	Falcon 9 Block 5	NROL-113	Active	Starshield constellation, launched with USA-400 to USA-420.
USA-420	2024-09-06	2024-160W	Reconnaissance	Falcon 9 Block 5	NROL-113	Active	Starshield constellation, launched with USA-400 to USA-420.
USA-421	2024-10-24	2024-192A	Reconnaissance	Falcon 9 Block 5	NROL-167	Active	Starshield constellation, launched with USA-421 to USA-437.
USA-422	2024-10-24	2024-192B	Reconnaissance	Falcon 9 Block 5	NROL-167	Active	Starshield constellation, launched with USA-421 to USA-437.
USA-423	2024-10-24	2024-192C	Reconnaissance	Falcon 9 Block 5	NROL-167	Active	Starshield constellation, launched with USA-421 to USA-437.
USA-424	2024-10-24	2024-192D	Reconnaissance	Falcon 9 Block 5	NROL-167	Active	Starshield constellation, launched with USA-421 to USA-437.
USA-425	2024-10-24	2024-192E	Reconnaissance	Falcon 9 Block 5	NROL-167	Active	Starshield constellation, launched with USA-421 to USA-437.
USA-426	2024-10-24	2024-192F	Reconnaissance	Falcon 9 Block 5	NROL-167	Active	Starshield constellation, launched with USA-421 to USA-437.
USA-427	2024-10-24	2024-192G	Reconnaissance	Falcon 9 Block 5	NROL-167	Active	Starshield constellation, launched with USA-421 to USA-437.
USA-428	2024-10-24	2024-192H	Reconnaissance	Falcon 9 Block 5	NROL-167	Active	Starshield constellation, launched with USA-421 to USA-437.
USA-429	2024-10-24	2024-192J	Reconnaissance	Falcon 9 Block 5	NROL-167	Active	Starshield constellation, launched with USA-421 to USA-437.
USA-430	2024-10-24	2024-192K	Reconnaissance	Falcon 9 Block 5	NROL-167	Active	Starshield constellation, launched with USA-421 to USA-437.
USA-431	2024-10-24	2024-192L	Reconnaissance	Falcon 9 Block 5	NROL-167	Active	Starshield constellation, launched with USA-421 to USA-437.
USA-432	2024-10-24	2024-192M	Reconnaissance	Falcon 9 Block 5	NROL-167	Active	Starshield constellation, launched with USA-421 to USA-437.
USA-433	2024-10-24	2024-192N	Reconnaissance	Falcon 9 Block 5	NROL-167	Active	Starshield constellation, launched with USA-421 to USA-437.
USA-434	2024-10-24	2024-192P	Reconnaissance	Falcon 9 Block 5	NROL-167	Active	Starshield constellation, launched with USA-421 to USA-437.
USA-435	2024-10-24	2024-192Q	Reconnaissance	Falcon 9 Block 5	NROL-167	Active	Starshield constellation, launched with USA-421 to USA-437.
USA-436	2024-10-24	2024-192R	Reconnaissance	Falcon 9 Block 5	NROL-167	Active	Starshield constellation, launched with USA-421 to USA-437.
USA-437	2024-10-24	2024-192S	Reconnaissance	Falcon 9 Block 5	NROL-167	Active	Starshield constellation, launched with USA-421 to USA-437.
USA-438	2024-11-30	2024-225W	Reconnaissance	Falcon 9 Block 5	NROL-126	Active	Starshield constellation, launched with USA-439 and Starlink Group N-01.
USA-439	2024-11-30	2024-225X	Reconnaissance	Falcon 9 Block 5	NROL-126	Active	Starshield constellation, launched with USA-438 and Starlink Group N-01.
USA-440	2024-12-17	2024-242A	Navigation	Falcon 9 Block 5	GPS-III 07 Sally Ride	Active	
USA-441	2024-12-17	2024-243A	Reconnaissance	Falcon 9 Block 5	NROL-149	Active	Starshield constellation, launched with USA-441 to USA-462.
USA-442	2024-12-17	2024-243B	Reconnaissance	Falcon 9 Block 5	NROL-149	Active	Starshield constellation, launched with USA-441 to USA-462.
USA-443	2024-12-17	2024-243C	Reconnaissance	Falcon 9 Block 5	NROL-149	Active	Starshield constellation, launched with USA-441 to USA-462.
USA-444	2024-12-17	2024-243D	Reconnaissance	Falcon 9 Block 5	NROL-149	Active	Starshield constellation, launched with USA-441 to USA-462.
USA-445	2024-12-17	2024-243E	Reconnaissance	Falcon 9 Block 5	NROL-149	Active	Starshield constellation, launched with USA-441 to USA-462.
USA-446	2024-12-17	2024-243F	Reconnaissance	Falcon 9 Block 5	NROL-149	Active	Starshield constellation, launched with USA-441 to USA-462.
USA-447	2024-12-17	2024-243G	Reconnaissance	Falcon 9 Block 5	NROL-149	Active	Starshield constellation, launched with USA-441 to USA-462.
USA-448	2024-12-17	2024-243H	Reconnaissance	Falcon 9 Block 5	NROL-149	Active	Starshield constellation, launched with USA-441 to USA-462.
USA-449	2024-12-17	2024-243I	Reconnaissance	Falcon 9 Block 5	NROL-149	Active	Starshield constellation, launched with USA-441 to USA-462.
USA-450	2024-12-17	2024-243J	Reconnaissance	Falcon 9 Block 5	NROL-149	Active	Starshield constellation, launched with USA-441 to USA-462.
USA-451	2024-12-17	2024-243K	Reconnaissance	Falcon 9 Block 5	NROL-149	Active	Starshield constellation, launched with USA-441 to USA-462.
USA-452	2024-12-17	2024-243L	Reconnaissance	Falcon 9 Block 5	NROL-149	Active	Starshield constellation, launched with USA-441 to USA-462.
USA-453	2024-12-17	2024-243M	Reconnaissance	Falcon 9 Block 5	NROL-149	Active	Starshield constellation, launched with USA-441 to USA-462.
USA-454	2024-12-17	2024-243N	Reconnaissance	Falcon 9 Block 5	NROL-149	Active	Starshield constellation, launched with USA-441 to USA-462.
USA-455	2024-12-17	2024-243O	Reconnaissance	Falcon 9 Block 5	NROL-149	Active	Starshield constellation, launched with USA-441 to USA-462.
USA-456	2024-12-17	2024-243P	Reconnaissance	Falcon 9 Block 5	NROL-149	Active	Starshield constellation, launched with USA-441 to USA-462.
USA-457	2024-12-17	2024-243Q	Reconnaissance	Falcon 9 Block 5	NROL-149	Active	Starshield constellation, launched with USA-441 to USA-462.
USA-458	2024-12-17	2024-243R	Reconnaissance	Falcon 9 Block 5	NROL-149	Active	Starshield constellation, launched with USA-441 to USA-462.
USA-459	2024-12-17	2024-243S	Reconnaissance	Falcon 9 Block 5	NROL-149	Active	Starshield constellation, launched with USA-441 to USA-462.
USA-460	2024-12-17	2024-243T	Reconnaissance	Falcon 9 Block 5	NROL-149	Active	Starshield constellation, launched with USA-441 to USA-462.
USA-461	2024-12-17	2024-243U	Reconnaissance	Falcon 9 Block 5	NROL-149	Active	Starshield constellation, launched with USA-441 to USA-462.
USA-462	2024-12-17	2024-243V	Reconnaissance	Falcon 9 Block 5	NROL-149	Active	Starshield constellation, launched with USA-441 to USA-462.
USA-463	2025-01-10	2024-004A	Reconnaissance	Falcon 9 Block 5	NROL-153	Active	Starshield constellation, launched with USA-463 to USA-484.
USA-464	2025-01-10	2024-004B	Reconnaissance	Falcon 9 Block 5	NROL-153	Active	Starshield constellation, launched with USA-463 to USA-484.
USA-465	2025-01-10	2024-004C	Reconnaissance	Falcon 9 Block 5	NROL-153	Active	Starshield constellation, launched with USA-463 to USA-484.
USA-466	2025-01-10	2024-00D	Reconnaissance	Falcon 9 Block 5	NROL-153	Active	Starshield constellation, launched with USA-463 to USA-484.
USA-467	2025-01-10	2024-004E	Reconnaissance	Falcon 9 Block 5	NROL-153	Active	Starshield constellation, launched with USA-463 to USA-484.
USA-468	2025-01-10	2024-004F	Reconnaissance	Falcon 9 Block 5	NROL-153	Active	Starshield constellation, launched with USA-463 to USA-484.
USA-469	2025-01-10	2024-004G	Reconnaissance	Falcon 9 Block 5	NROL-153	Active	Starshield constellation, launched with USA-463 to USA-484.
USA-470	2025-01-10	2024-004H	Reconnaissance	Falcon 9 Block 5	NROL-153	Active	Starshield constellation, launched with USA-463 to USA-484.
USA-471	2025-01-10	2024-004I	Reconnaissance	Falcon 9 Block 5	NROL-153	Active	Starshield constellation, launched with USA-463 to USA-484.
USA-472	2025-01-10	2024-004J	Reconnaissance	Falcon 9 Block 5	NROL-153	Active	Starshield constellation, launched with USA-463 to USA-484.
USA-473	2025-01-10	2024-004K	Reconnaissance	Falcon 9 Block 5	NROL-153	Active	Starshield constellation, launched with USA-463 to USA-484.
USA-474	2025-01-10	2024-004L	Reconnaissance	Falcon 9 Block 5	NROL-153	Active	Starshield constellation, launched with USA-463 to USA-484.
USA-475	2025-01-10	2024-004M	Reconnaissance	Falcon 9 Block 5	NROL-153	Active	Starshield constellation, launched with USA-463 to USA-484.
USA-476	2025-01-10	2024-004N	Reconnaissance	Falcon 9 Block 5	NROL-153	Active	Starshield constellation, launched with USA-463 to USA-484.
USA-477	2025-01-10	2024-004O	Reconnaissance	Falcon 9 Block 5	NROL-153	Active	Starshield constellation, launched with USA-463 to USA-484.
USA-478	2025-01-10	2024-004P	Reconnaissance	Falcon 9 Block 5	NROL-153	Active	Starshield constellation, launched with USA-463 to USA-484.
USA-479	2025-01-10	2024-004Q	Reconnaissance	Falcon 9 Block 5	NROL-153	Active	Starshield constellation, launched with USA-463 to USA-484.
USA-480	2025-01-10	2024-004R	Reconnaissance	Falcon 9 Block 5	NROL-153	Active	Starshield constellation, launched with USA-463 to USA-484.
USA-481	2025-01-10	2024-004S	Reconnaissance	Falcon 9 Block 5	NROL-153	Active	Starshield constellation, launched with USA-463 to USA-484.
USA-482	2025-01-10	2024-004T	Reconnaissance	Falcon 9 Block 5	NROL-153	Active	Starshield constellation, launched with USA-463 to USA-484.
USA-483	2025-01-10	2024-004U	Reconnaissance	Falcon 9 Block 5	NROL-153	Active	Starshield constellation, launched with USA-463 to USA-484.
USA-484	2025-01-10	2024-004V	Reconnaissance	Falcon 9 Block 5	NROL-153	Active	Starshield constellation, launched with USA-463 to USA-484.
USA-485	2025-01-21	2024-014V	Reconnaissance	Falcon 9 Block 5		Active	launched with USA-486 and Starlink Group 13-1.
USA-486	2025-01-21	2024-014W	Reconnaissance	Falcon 9 Block 5		Active	launched with USA-485 and Starlink Group 13-1.
USA-487	2025-03-21	2025-058A	Reconnaissance	Falcon 9 Block 5	NROL-57	Active	Starshield constellation, launched with USA-487 to USA-497.
USA-488	2025-03-21	2025-058B	Reconnaissance	Falcon 9 Block 5	NROL-57	Active	Starshield constellation, launched with USA-487 to USA-497.
USA-489	2025-03-21	2025-058C	Reconnaissance	Falcon 9 Block 5	NROL-57	Active	Starshield constellation, launched with USA-487 to USA-497.
USA-490	2025-03-21	2025-058D	Reconnaissance	Falcon 9 Block 5	NROL-57	Active	Starshield constellation, launched with USA-487 to USA-497.
USA-491	2025-03-21	2025-058E	Reconnaissance	Falcon 9 Block 5	NROL-57	Active	Starshield constellation, launched with USA-487 to USA-497.
USA-492	2025-03-21	2025-058F	Reconnaissance	Falcon 9 Block 5	NROL-57	Active	Starshield constellation, launched with USA-487 to USA-497.
USA-493	2025-03-21	2025-058G	Reconnaissance	Falcon 9 Block 5	NROL-57	Active	Starshield constellation, launched with USA-487 to USA-497.
USA-494	2025-03-21	2025-058H	Reconnaissance	Falcon 9 Block 5	NROL-57	Active	Starshield constellation, launched with USA-487 to USA-497.
USA-495	2025-03-21	2025-058I	Reconnaissance	Falcon 9 Block 5	NROL-57	Active	Starshield constellation, launched with USA-487 to USA-497.
USA-496	2025-03-21	2025-058J	Reconnaissance	Falcon 9 Block 5	NROL-57	Active	Starshield constellation, launched with USA-487 to USA-497.
USA-497	2025-03-21	2025-058K	Reconnaissance	Falcon 9 Block 5	NROL-57	Active	Starshield constellation, launched with USA-487 to USA-497.
USA-498	2025-03-24	2025-060A	SIGINT	Falcon 9 Block 5	NROL-69 (Intruder-F/O 2/NOSS-4 2)	Active	
USA-499	2025-04-12	2025-074A	Reconnaissance	Falcon 9 Block 5	NROL-192	Active	Starshield constellation, launched with USA-499 to USA-520.
USA-500	2025-04-12	2025-074B	Reconnaissance	Falcon 9 Block 5	NROL-192	Active	Starshield constellation, launched with USA-499 to USA-520.

== See also ==
- List of OPS Satellites
- List of USA satellites (501-1000)
- List of NRO launches
- NSSL Missions
