= Prowler (satellite) =

American satellite used to study Soviet satellites

- Mission type: Satellite inspection
- Operator: US NRO
- COSPAR ID: N/A
- SATCAT no.: N/A

Spacecraft properties
- Bus: HS-376
- Manufacturer: Hughes
- Launch mass: 1,300 kilograms (2,900 lb)

Start of mission
- Launch date: 15 November 1990, 23:48:13 UTC
- Rocket: Space Shuttle Atlantis; STS-38 / PAM-D
- Launch site: Kennedy LC-39A

Orbital parameters
- Reference system: Geocentric
- Regime: Near-geosynchronous

Prowler was an American reconnaissance satellite launched aboard Space Shuttle Atlantis in 1990 to study Soviet satellites in geosynchronous orbit. The government of the United States has never acknowledged its existence, however it has been identified by amateur observers and through leaked information.

== Spacecraft ==
Prowler was based on the HS-376 satellite bus, developed by Hughes. It had a mass of around 1,300 kilograms (2,900 lb) and carried modifications to reduce its visibility to ground-based observers and to radar. Following the satellite's retirement these modifications ceased to be effective, allowing it to be found by amateur observers.

Prowler was designed to maneuver to within a few meters of satellites in geosynchronous orbit. Its purpose was either to monitor them and return data about them, or to perform a signals intelligence mission such as intercepting communications between those satellites and the ground.

== Launch ==
It seems that Prowler was deployed from Space Shuttle Atlantis during the STS-38 mission. STS-38 was launched from Launch Complex 39A at the Kennedy Space Center at 23:48:13 UTC on 15 November 1990. The mission was officially acknowledged to have deployed a single satellite, USA-67, which observers have since identified as part of the Satellite Data System. Prowler was deployed from Atlantis at around 04:37 UTC on 17 November 1990, and boosted into geosynchronous transfer orbit by a PAM-D upper stage. A second patch produced for the STS-38 mission showed a Shuttle orbiter in shadows above an illuminated orbiter; reversing the official mission patch; symbolizing the covert nature of the mission.

== Identification ==
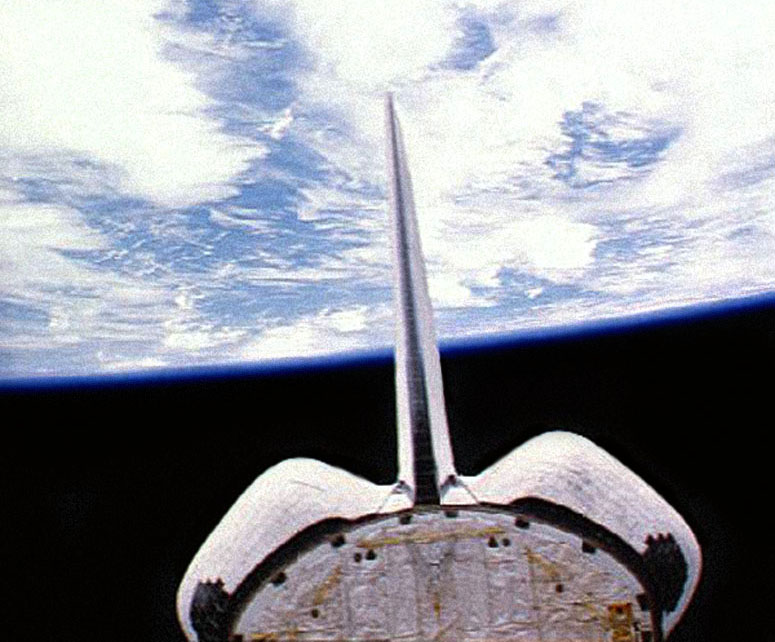
Atlantis in orbit, without IUS support equipment

The nature of STS-38's payload was classified, but observers attempted to identify it. Since Prowler is by nature stealthy, USA-67 was initially believed to be the only satellite deployed. Thus, because of the single payload and two upper stages, USA-67 was believed to be a Magnum satellite, deployed via a two-stage Inertial Upper Stage (IUS). Photographs released from later in the STS-38 mission have shown that Atlantis was not carrying the adaptor necessary to deploy an IUS during STS-38.

In July 1998, amateur observers in Texas observed an unidentified object flashing in geosynchronous orbit. The object was subsequently lost, then was rediscovered in June 2000 when its flashes became brighter, some even visible with the naked eye. Following the 2000 observations amateur observers were still unable to identify the satellite, so began referring to it by the pseudo International Designator 2000-653A and pseudo Satellite Catalog Number 90007.

In 2004 NBC published an article containing details about Prowler and its mission.

In January 2010, amateur observer Ted Molczan cross-referenced data from the European Space Agency's Classification of Geosynchronous Objects survey with amateur observations of classified spacecraft, noting that an unidentified object designated UI.139 by the survey corresponded with observations of 2000-653A, and that its orbit was close to that of USA-67 - speculating that they may have been from the same launch. Based on this, Molczan conducted a more detailed investigation, and in 2011 published a paper identifying 2000-653A as Prowler.

The NRO's March 2025 response to a Freedom of Information Act request for records about the STS-38 payload, neither confirming nor denying that such records exist

In March 2025, responding to a Freedom of Information Act request for records relating to the STS-38 payload, the NRO stated that it could neither confirm nor deny the existence of responsive records, on the grounds that the fact of their existence or nonexistence was itself classified under Executive Order 13526.

== See also ==
- Misty (satellite)
- MiTEx
- Space Based Space Surveillance
- Zirconic
