= Silentbarker =

Class of United States spy satellites

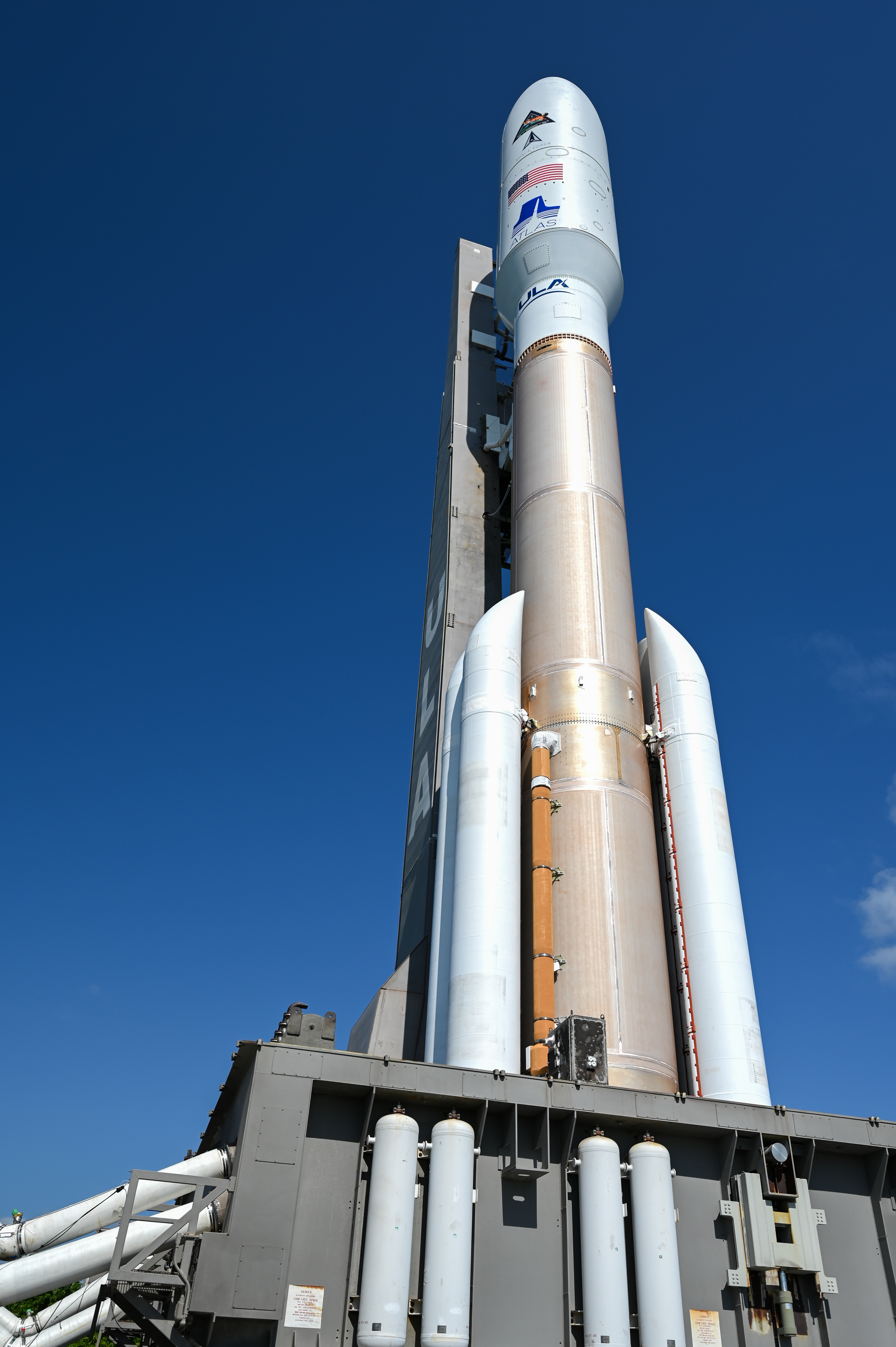
Atlas V of NROL-107 mission

Silentbarker is a class of classified United States spy satellites for space domain awareness developed by US Space Force and National Reconnaissance Office.

In December 2025, USSF System Delta 89 announced that it was seeking a new satellite to replace the Silentbarker series. The USSF has also said it intends not to partner with the National Reconnaissance Office (NRO) for the replacement.

== Satellites ==
Name	Launch date	Launcher	COSPAR ID	Status	Notes
Silentbarker 1, USA-346	10 September 2023	Atlas V	2023-140A		NROL-107
Silentbarker 2, USA-347	10 September 2023	Atlas V	2023-140B		NROL-107
Silentbarker 3, USA-348	10 September 2023	Atlas V	2023-140C		NROL-107

== See also ==
- Space domain awareness
- Space Based Space Surveillance
- Geosynchronous Space Situational Awareness Program
