= System Delta 89 =

System Delta 89 (SYD 89)
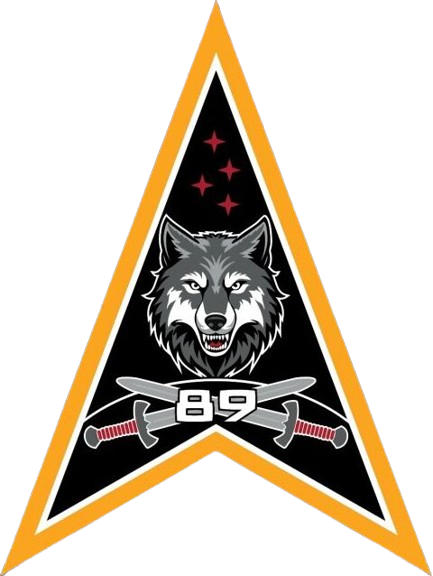
- Active: September 30, 2025 - present
- Country: United States
- Branch: Space Force
- Part of: Space Systems Command
- Garrison/HQ: Los Angeles Air Force Base
- Nickname: Wolfpack

Commanders
- Current commander: Col Brendan Hochstein

Insignia
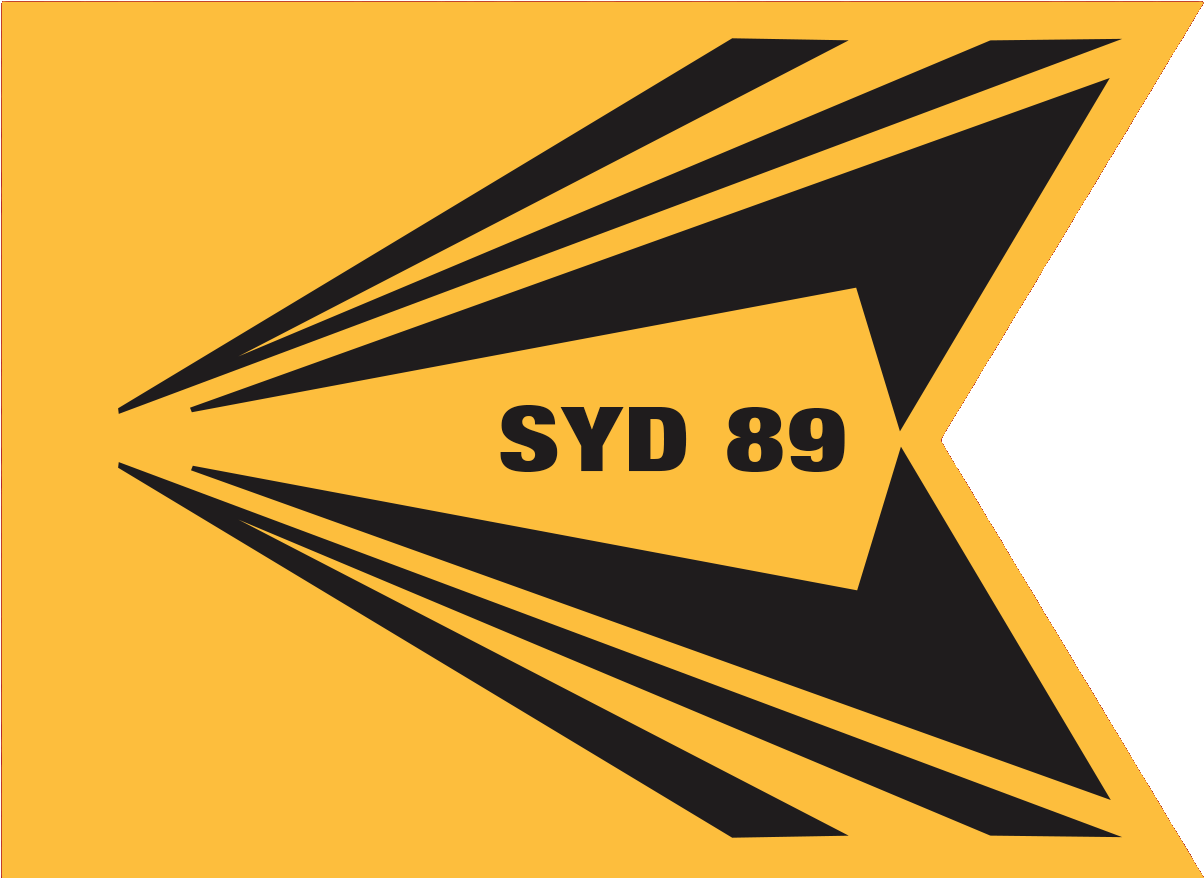
- SYD 89 GUIDON

Systems Delta 89 (SYD 89) is a unit of the United States Space Force (USSF) that was activated on September 20, 2025. The mission of SYD 89 is to provide sustainment to cyber, ground and space based combat power elements of U.S. units and allied partners. Col. Brendan Hochstein took command of the unit at its activation.

SYD 89 has four System Program Directors (SPD) in the areas of Orbital Warfare, Space Superiority, Spectrum Warfare and Innovation and Prototyping.

In December 2025, SYD 89 announced that it was seeking a new satellite to replace the Silentbarker series. The USSF has also said it intends not to partner with the National Reconnaissance Office (NRO) for the replacement.
