= USA-165 =

U.S. Air Force military satellite

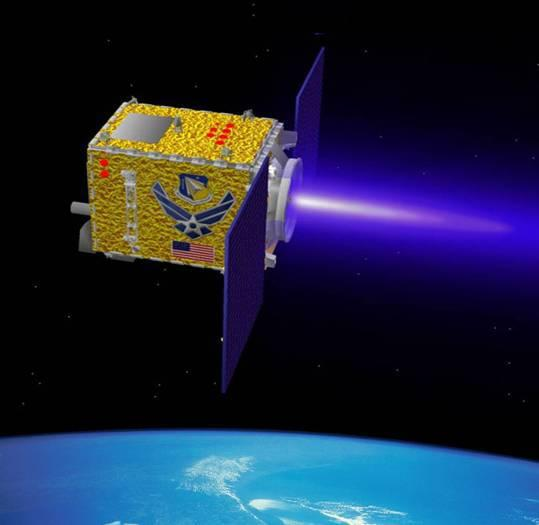
- XSS-11 computer model
- Mission type: Technology
- Operator: AFRL
- COSPAR ID: 2005-011A
- SATCAT no.: 28636

Spacecraft properties
- Manufacturer: Lockheed Martin
- Launch mass: 100 kilograms (220 lb)

Start of mission
- Launch date: April 11, 2005
- Rocket: Minotaur I
- Launch site: Vandenberg SLC-8
- Contractor: Orbital

End of mission
- Decay date: November 11, 2013

Orbital parameters
- Reference system: Geocentric
- Regime: Low Earth
- Eccentricity: 0.002487906
- Perigee altitude: 839 kilometers (521 mi)
- Apogee altitude: 875 kilometers (544 mi)
- Inclination: 98.8& degrees
- Period: 102.1 minutes

USA-165 or XSS-11 (Experimental Satellite System-11) is a small, washing-machine-sized, low-cost spacecraft developed by the U.S. Air Force Research Laboratory's Space Vehicles Directorate to test technology for proximity operations. In particular, the satellite was designed to demonstrate "autonomous rendezvous and proximity maneuvers." In other words, it would approach, investigate, and photograph other spacecraft in Earth orbit. It would help test the feasibility of in-space inspection and repair. The spacecraft was also designed to test systems that would allow the spacecraft to maneuver autonomously.

USA-165 was built by Lockheed Martin and weighed 125 kg with an excess of 600 m/s delta-v. USA-165 was launched into Low Earth Orbit on April 11, 2005, on a Minotaur rocket and remained in its primary orbit for over eighteen months, but then in December 2006 it was maneuvered into a disposal orbit and lost to satellite spotters. USA-165 was later rediscovered by amateur satellite watcher Kevin Fetter. The satellite re-entered the atmosphere on November 11, 2013.

The NASA GRAIL spacecraft design was based on XSS-11 design.

== See also ==
- MiTEx
