= USA-197 =

American missile detection satellite

- Mission type: Missile Detection
- Operator: US Air Force
- COSPAR ID: 2007-054A
- SATCAT no.: 32287

Spacecraft properties
- Spacecraft type: DSP
- Manufacturer: Northrop Grumman

Start of mission
- Launch date: 11 November 2007
- Rocket: Delta IV Heavy
- Launch site: Cape Canaveral, SLC-37B

USA-197, also known as DSP-23, is a missile detection satellite and part of the Defense Support Program that was launched in 2007.

== Launch ==
United Launch Alliance (ULA) performed the launch of USA-197 using a Delta IV Heavy rocket in from SLC-37B of the Cape Canaveral Space Force Station on November 11, 2007.
