= LACE (satellite) =

American military satellite

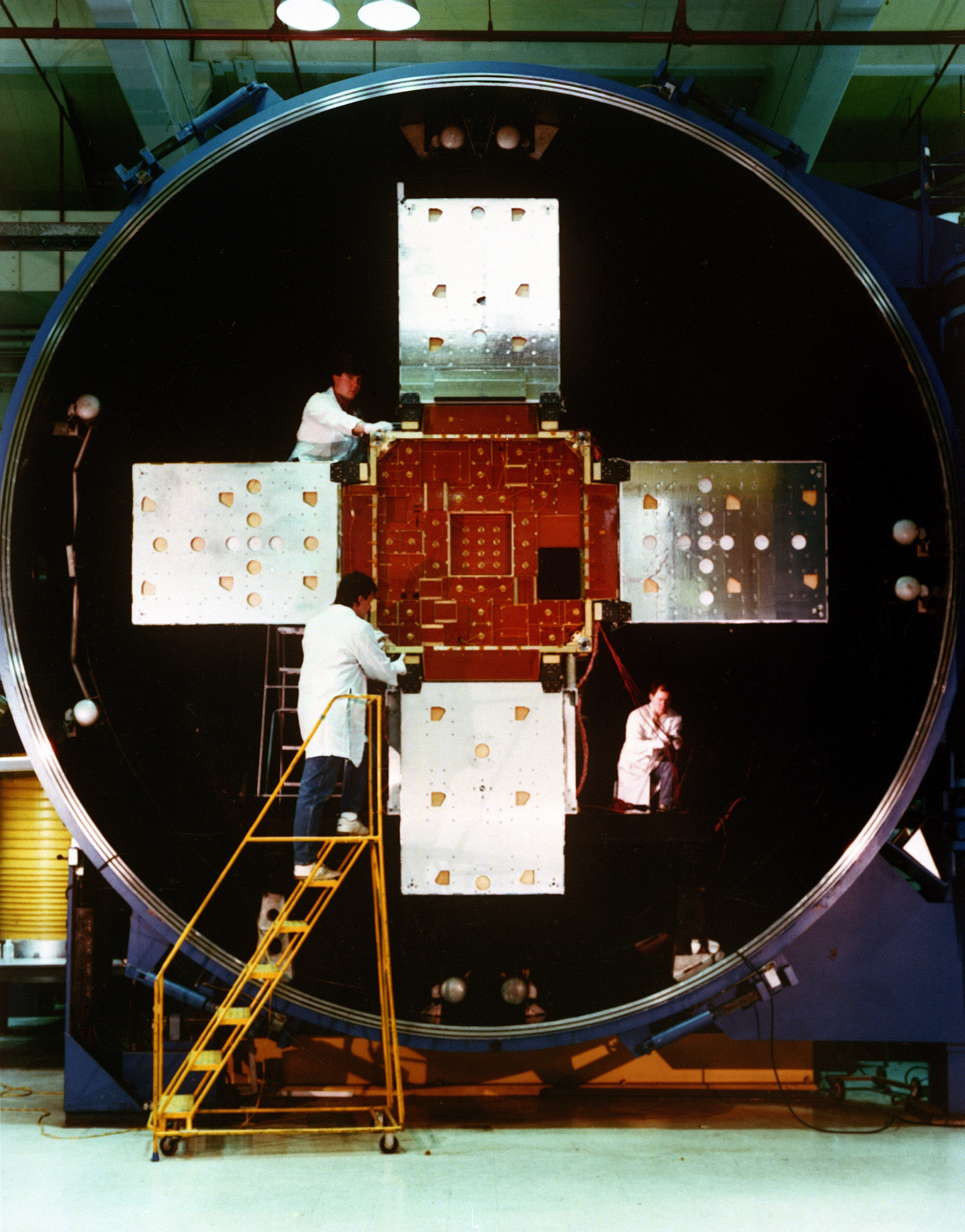
- LACE being serviced before launch
- Names: LOSAT-L; USA-51
- Mission type: Technology demonstration
- Operator: Strategic Defense Initiative Organization
- COSPAR ID: 1990-015A
- SATCAT no.: 20496
- Mission duration: 3 years

Spacecraft properties
- Manufacturer: Naval Research Laboratory
- Launch mass: 3,175 pounds (1,440 kg)
- Dimensions: Body: 1.2m x 1.2m x 2.4m (height)

Start of mission
- Launch date: February 14, 1990, 16:15:00 UTC
- Rocket: Delta II 6920-8 (D192)
- Launch site: Cape Canaveral, LC-17B
- Contractor: McDonnell Douglas Space Systems
- Entered service: April 15, 1990

End of mission
- Disposal: Decommissioned
- Deactivated: February 14, 1993
- Decay date: May 24, 2000

Orbital parameters
- Reference system: Geocentric
- Regime: Low Earth
- Eccentricity: 0.00123
- Perigee altitude: 532.00 km (287.26 nmi)
- Apogee altitude: 549.00 km (296.44 nmi)
- Inclination: 43.000 degrees
- Period: 95.30 minutes
- Epoch: 1990-02-14 00:00:00 UTC

Main telescope
- Name: Ultraviolet Plume Instrument (Plume Camera)
- Type: Maksutov-Cassegrain
- Diameter: 10 cm
- Focal length: 600 cm
- Collecting area: 78 cm^{2}
- Wavelengths: 195-300 nm

Instruments
- Army Background Experiment (ABE); Radiation Detection Experiment (RDE); Sensor Array Subsystem (SAS); Ultraviolet Plume Instrument (UVPI)

The Low-Power Atmospheric Compensation Experiment (LACE), also referred to as LOSAT-L and USA-51, was a military satellite developed by the Naval Research Laboratory for the United States' Strategic Defense Initiative in the late 1980s and early 1990s, otherwise referred to as the "Star Wars" program.

== Background ==
The LACE mission concept began in February 1985 when the Strategic Defense Initiative Organization approached the Naval Research Laboratory to develop an experiment to characterize laser signals transmitted and received through the Earth's atmosphere from a ground station to an orbiting experiment. The laboratory had been involved with spaceflight since the dawn of the space race, having led the Navy's Vanguard program up until 1959. Since then the laboratory had developed satellites to perform experiments relating to solar radiation, radio transmission through the ionosphere, gravity gradient stabilization, and ocean surveillance, among others.

In July 1985, the Laser Communication Experiment (LACE) began development. The simple, spaceborne experiment was planned to be flown on the next flight of NASA's Long Duration Exposure Facility (LDEF), launched aboard the Space Shuttle. Because the LDEF was a completely passive payload, LACE would've required additional power and communication subsystems to function properly. After the Challenger disaster, shuttle launches were delayed indefinitely, and the LDEF would remain in orbit from the beginning of its first mission until 1990. This led to the further development of LACE into a full satellite by June 1986, and the availability of expendable launch vehicles such as the Atlas, Titan, and Delta rockets to launch government payloads such as LACE. The satellite would later be renamed to be the Low-power Atmospheric Compensation Experiment.

Before launch, LACE was placed in the Delta II's payload fairing alongside the Relay Mirror Experiment (RME) satellite. Also known as USA-52 and LOSAT-R, it was also sponsored by the SDIO for ground-to-orbit laser tests and was built by Ball Aerospace. The two satellites and a third, LOSAT-X, were originally meant to be launched together, and were all part of the SDIO's LOSAT (LOw-altitude SATellite) program, even though they all had different designs and missions. LOSAT-X was removed from the launch manifest and would launch the following year with the GPS satellite USA-71.

== Spacecraft ==
LACE did not have any onboard propulsion systems, instead, it relied on gravity-gradient stabilization to keep its experiments pointed towards Earth. It accomplished this using three 150 ft (46 m) long booms pointing along the forward, rear, and zenith axes of the spacecraft relative to the direction of its motion. While the zenith boom would remain fully extended during normal operation, the two booms along the forward and rear axes were designed to be extended and retracted 125 times during the 30 months of LACE's planned mission, and successfully did so over 65 times, albeit most movements were minor. The three booms were the largest retractable booms ever flown in space at the time of LACE's launch in 1990.

== Instruments ==
=== Sensor Array Subsystem (SAS) ===
The Sensor Array Subsystem was the primary payload of the LACE satellite. It contained three sets of sensor arrays with a total of 210 sensors designed to detect laser emissions on-orbit from visible, pulsed, and infrared lasers on Earth.

The visible sensor array had 85 sensors distributed in the center of the earth-facing "target board". It was specifically designed to detect laser emissions from the Short Wavelength Adaptive Techniques (SWAT) program's argon ion laser at the Air Force Maui Optical Station (AMOS) in Maui, Hawaii. The array was sensitive to laser emissions between 400 nanometers (nm) to 1.06 micrometers (μm). Before launch it was calibrated for the SWAT laser's wavelength of 514.5 nm, which was designed by the MIT Lincoln Laboratory. Later in the mission, this array was re-calibrated to 1.06 μm to support the USAF Starfire Optical Range at Kirtland AFB, New Mexico.

The pulsed array's 85 sensors were located in the same housings as the visible array sensors. They were calibrated at 354 nm and 1.06 μm, and were designed to generally support pulsed excimer lasers at wavelengths from 300 to 400 nm and a low-power laser emulator at 1.06 μm. The array detected pulses of durations from 10 nanoseconds (ns) to 2 microseconds (μs) with a maximum repetition rate of 100 pulses per second.

Like the visible array, the infrared array was also designed for a specific laser program: the Low Power Chemical Laser (LPCL) at White Sands, New Mexico. The array's 40 sensors were distributed uniformly across the target board, and detected deuterium fluoride chemical laser emissions between 3.6 and 4.0 μm.

=== Ultraviolet Plume Instrument (UVPI) ===
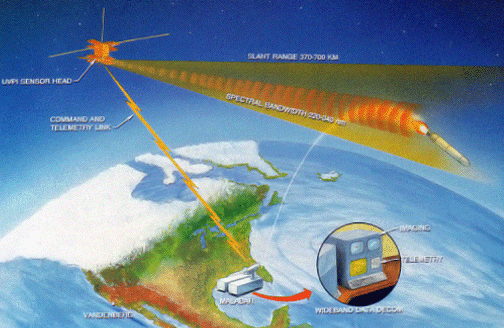
Concept of Operations for the UVPI experiment onboard LACE

The purpose of the Ultraviolet Plume Instrument (UVPI) experiment was to accurately image and track the plume of a rocket launched from Earth's surface in the ultraviolet spectrum. It was a pointable telescope mounted on the earth-facing side of the LACE spacecraft. Its mission was to collect images of rocket plumes in the near-ultraviolet and midultraviolet regimes from a space-based platform. It was also used to collect background image data of Earth, Earth's limb, and celestial objects. Background imaging included the day, night, and dawn limb, aurora, sunlit and moonlit clouds, and the Earth's surface.

The UVPI consisted of two image-intensified CCD cameras that were boresighted and shared a Maksutov-Cassegrain telescope. The tracker camera was sensitive in the near-ultraviolet/visible wavelength region, had a field of view approximately 14 times larger in each dimension than the plume camera, and was used to locate, acquire, and track a target. The plume camera collected images at four wavelengths from 195 to 350 nm, selected with a filter wheel. The field of view was 0.184 x 0.137 degrees. Its photometric range and sensitivity were optimized for nighttime operations. The tracker camera could image stars as dim as visual magnitude 7. Normal frame rate was 5 per second, but the zoom mode rate was 30 per second with a reduced field of view.

=== Army Background Experiment (ABE) ===
The Army Background Experiment was commissioned by the U.S. Army Strategic Defense Command to measure the space neutron background radiation from the LACE satellite. It consisted of four borated plastic scintillator rods 8 in. long by 3 in. in diameter attached to a fold-out panel on the nadir side of LACE. The rods would detect neutrons originating from atmospheric escape and from the spacecraft's body. The experiment was jointly developed by the Grumman Corporation and the Los Alamos National Laboratory, with the support of the U.S. Department of Energy. Within a few months after the launch of LACE, the ABE was reported to be operating nominally, and it was expected to remain in operation through LACE's expected 30 month lifetime.

Data from ABE was provided to the SDIO for the development of spaceborne systems to discriminate between warheads and decoys.

=== Radiation Detection Experiment (RDE) ===
The Radiation Detection Experiment (RDE) was an experiment on the earth-facing side of LACE to detect electromagnetic radiation. It was designed by The Aerospace Corporation for the U.S. Air Force. The classified experiment was the only one not operated for the Strategic Defense Initiative, and was not discussed by the SDIO nor the NRL prior to launch. It collected data for 14 months throughout LACE's mission.

== Operational history ==
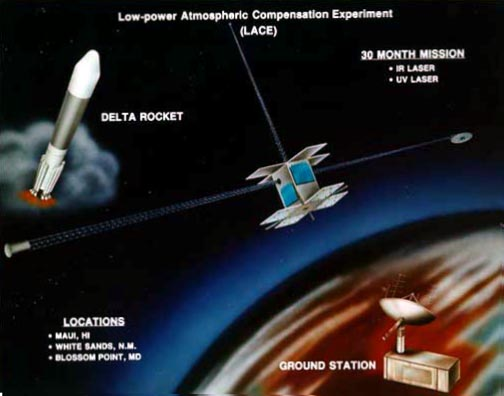
Overview diagram of the LACE mission, showing the satellite deployed in orbit, the rocket it was launched on, a ground station on Earth, and a list of ground station sites on the bottom left.

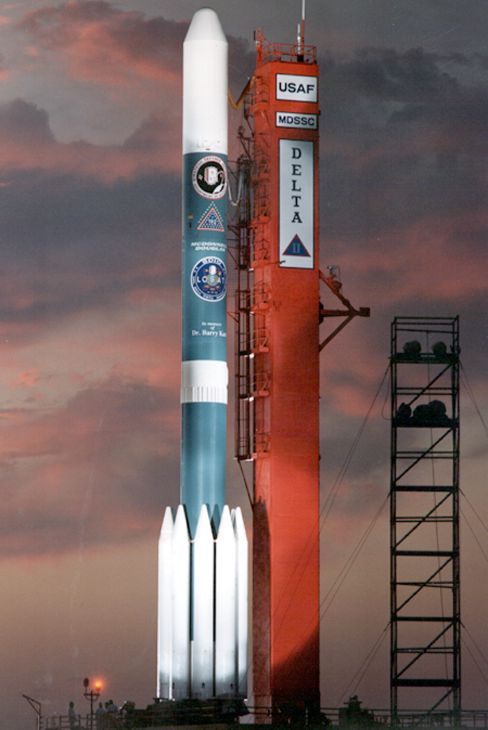
A Delta II 6920-8 sitting on launchpad LC-17B at dawn/dusk before launching LACE from Cape Canaveral Air Force Station.

LACE was launched aboard a Delta II Rocket from Launch Complex 17B at Cape Canaveral Air Force Station on February 14, 1990, separating from the RME satellite approximately 15 minutes later. It was the first Department of Defense payload launched on a commercial launch vehicle.

About a month after launch, it was reported that LACE and RME had experienced some setbacks in their missions, but none critical enough to end their mission. A Pentagon official stated that LACE's retroreflector system wasn't sending back signals at the expected power level, which that official speculated that the issue could be due to heat damage to a reflector.

LACE would proceed smoothly through the rest of its 60-day check-out phase, and it began its planned 30-month mission shortly after.

Exactly 3 years after its launch date, LACE was deactivated by the SDIO, ending its mission. It decayed into the atmosphere on May 24, 2000.

In 1998, while LACE was described as a "dead" satellite by the U.S. Army, its retroreflector was used as a target for the Low Power Chemical Laser and tracked with the SeaLite Beam Director at the High Energy Laser Systems Test Facility to support the DoD's MIRACL program.

The LACE program's net funding was $122.3 million over its lifetime.

=== Plume observations ===
==== Space Shuttle ====
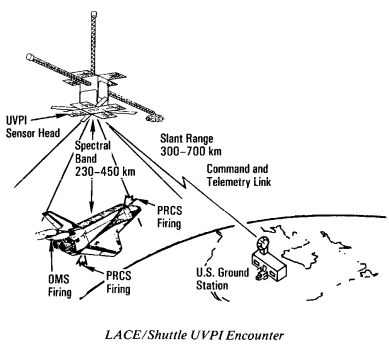
The LACE satellite, Space Shuttle, and ground station during an observation attempt.

Several attempts were made between 1990 and 1992 to image the plumes fired by the Space Shuttle from its Orbital Maneuvering System pods and Reaction Control System thrusters as it orbited in low-earth orbit at a lower orbital inclination than LACE. The UVPI was listed as a secondary experiment in about half of the shuttle's missions launched during LACE's operation, including in pre-flight press kits and media resource kits, and post-flight mission summaries published by NASA. (Note: Eleven shuttle missions in total: STS-35 STS-39 STS-43 STS-44 STS-42 STS-45 STS-49 STS-50 STS-46 STS-47 STS-53) Shuttle astronauts were briefed on the UVPI experiment during training sessions before their missions, and they took photos of thruster firings on board the shuttle done to support the UVPI, particularly on STS-50. However, no thruster firings were successfully imaged by the UVPI while the Space Shuttle was in orbit. There were a number of reasons why it was difficult for this to happen, according to "The NRL LACE Program Final Report":

- Two bodies traveling at orbital velocities were involved.
- The observation opportunity inevitably occurred away from LACE ground stations and had to be controlled by stored commands.
- The shuttle could and did change its orbit after the controlling commands were stored in the LACE satellite.
- NASA could never guarantee that there would be plume-generating activity during the few seconds of the observation opportunity.

For example, during the STS-44 mission, the SDIO planned to observe thruster firings from the Space Shuttle Atlantis's OMS and PRCS pods with LACE and the UVPI over four to six orbital conjunctions. However, due to Atlantis maneuvering to avoid a spent Soviet booster in orbit, and a failure of one of its IMUs, NASA's flight rules brought the mission to an early end.

==== Table of UVPI plume observation attempts ====
UVPI Plume Observation Activity
Date	Target	Rehearsals	Observation attempts	Comments
March 1990	Titan	0	0	Launch outside LACE pass
July 1990	SPEAR II	4	2	Launch outside LACE pass
August 1990	SPFE 1 (Nikha)	3	1	Plume observed; 1st successful observation
November 1990	Titan	3	0	Launch outside LACE pass
November 1990	DMSP	0	0	Launch outside LACE pass
December 1990	Shuttle (STS-35)	0	3	Daylight, remote; no plume
December 1990	LCLV	1	0	Launch rescheduled
December 1990	Starbird	3	1	Plume observed; 2nd successful observation
December 1990	LCLV	2	0	Launch rescheduled
February 1991	LCLV	3	1	Plume observed; 3rd successful observation
February 1991	Strypi	5	1	Plume observed; 4th successful observation
April 1991	SPFE 2 (Nikha)	5	0	Launch outside LACE pass
May 1991	Shuttle (STS-39)	0	1	Night, remote; no plume
May 1991	GBI/ERIS (Note: Ground-Based Interceptor / Exoatmospheric Reentry Interceptor Subsystem)	3	0	Launch outside LACE pass
June 1991	AST	3	0	Launch rescheduled
July 1991	Pegasus	2	0	Launch outside LACE pass
November 1991	Shuttle (STS-44)	0	0	Early return; no opportunity
March 1992	Shuttle solid (STS-45)	2	1	Plume observed; ground burn

== Gallery ==
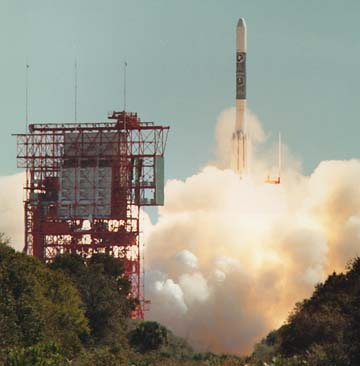
A Delta II rocket at launch carrying the LACE satellite for the Department of Defense's Strategic Defense Initiative.

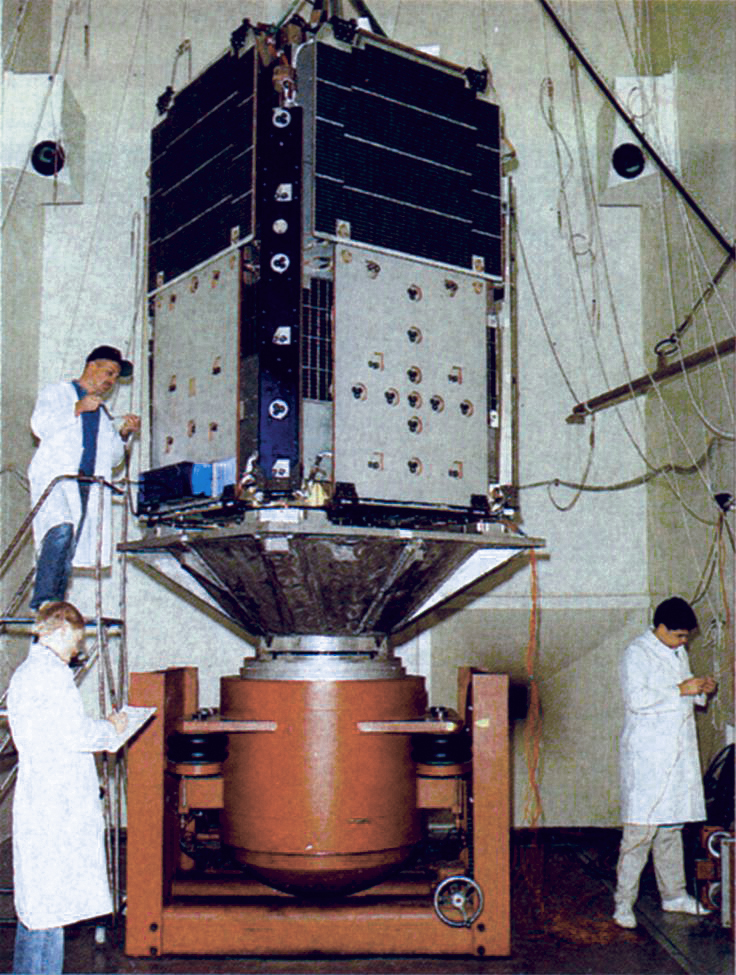
LACE undergoing inspection in an acoustic chamber

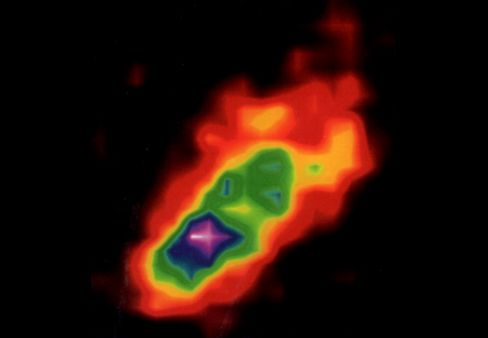
The plume of a Black Brant XI third stage as imaged by the UVPI

Short video about the LACE satellite produced by the NRL
