= USA-205 =

Satellite operated by the United States Missile Defense Agency

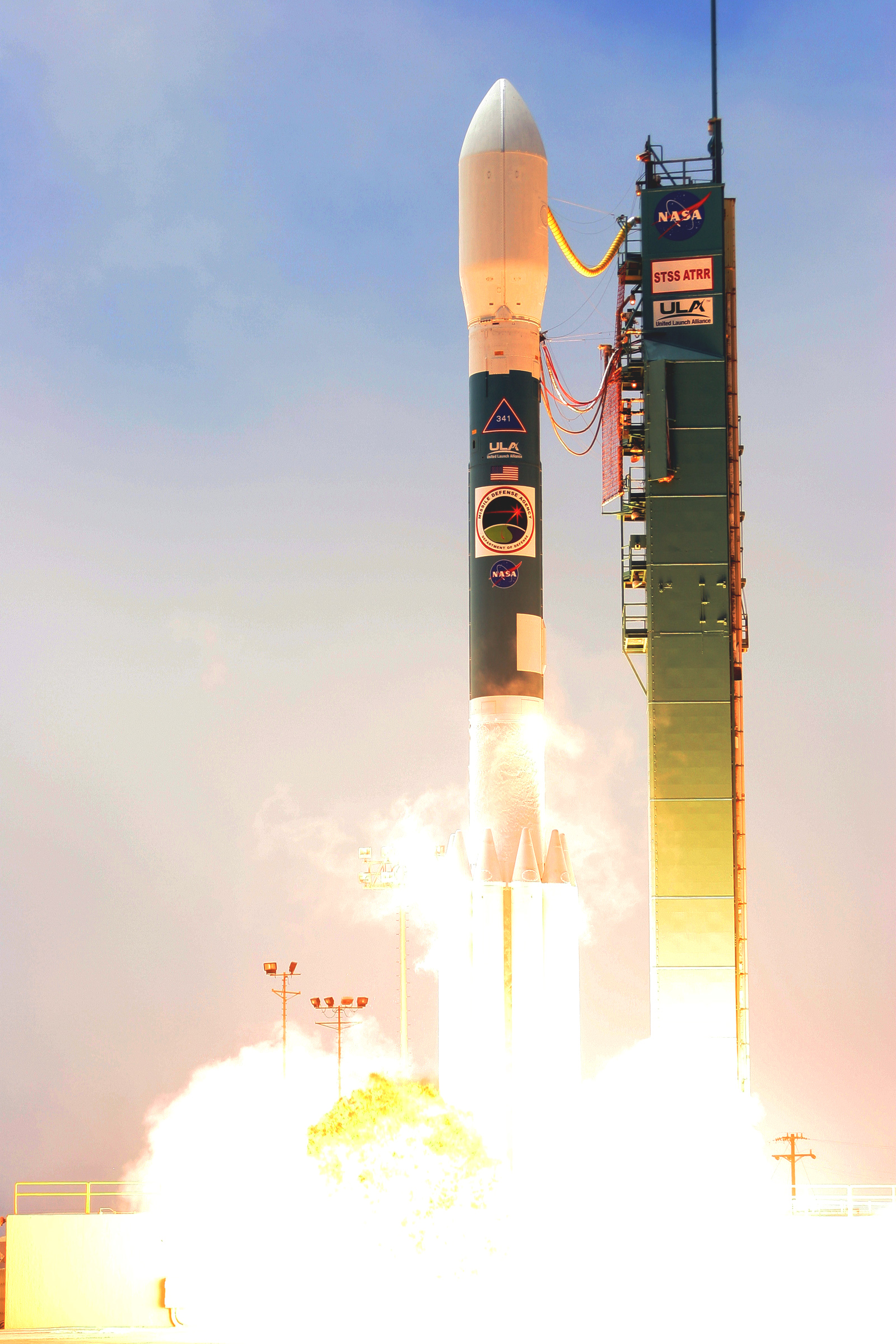
- Launch of a Delta II rocket carrying an experimental satellite (STSS-ATRR) for the Missile Defense Agency.
- Names: STSS-ATRR; Block 2010 Spacecraft Risk Reduction
- Mission type: U.S. military technology demonstration
- Operator: Missile Defense Agency / U.S. Air Force
- COSPAR ID: 2009-023A
- SATCAT no.: 34903

Start of mission
- Launch date: 5 May 2009, 20:24:25 UTC
- Rocket: Delta II 7920-10C (Delta D341)
- Launch site: Vandenberg, SLC-2W
- Contractor: United Launch Alliance

Orbital parameters
- Reference system: Geocentric orbit
- Regime: Sun-synchronous orbit
- Inclination: 97.8°

USA-205, also known as Space Tracking and Surveillance System-Advanced Technology Risk Reduction (STSS-ATRR), and previously as Block 2010 Spacecraft Risk Reduction is a satellite formerly operated by the United States Missile Defense Agency. It was launched to demonstrate new technology for missile detection early warning systems (MDEWS). The technology demonstrated on STSS-ATRR was used in the development of the Space Tracking and Surveillance System (STSS) part of the Space-Based Infrared System (SBIRS).

It was launched on a Delta II 7920-10C launch vehicle from Space Launch Complex 2W (SLC-2W) at the Vandenberg Air Force Base (VAFB) in California, at 20:24:25 UTC on 5 May 2009 into a Sun-synchronous orbit (SSO). The launch was conducted by United Launch Alliance.

Operational and administrative control of the Space Tracking and Surveillance System-Advanced Technology Risk Reduction (STSS-ATRR) satellite was transferred to Air Force Space Command (AFSPC), effective 31 January 2011. In addition to successfully demonstrating required on orbit system performance parameters for a prototype sensor technology, STSS-ATRR conducted Space Situational Awareness and related operations on an as-capable basis.
