= USA-2 =

American reconnaissance satellite

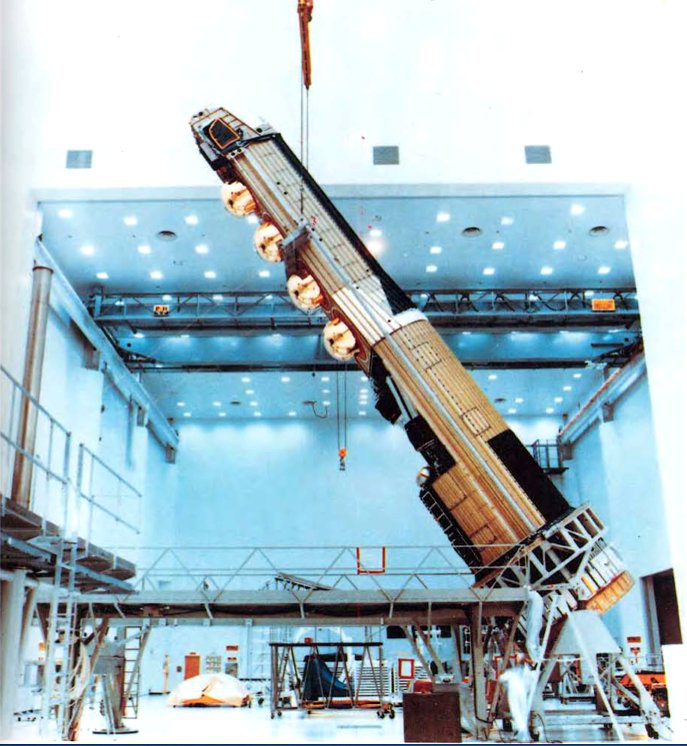
- KH-9 HEXAGON during Integration
- Mission type: Film-return
- Operator: USAF
- COSPAR ID: 1984-065A
- Mission duration: 40-275 days

Spacecraft properties
- Manufacturer: Lockheed Martin
- Launch mass: 11,400 Kg

Start of mission
- Launch date: 25 June 1984
- Rocket: Titan 34D
- Launch site: Vandenberg, SLC-4E
- Contractor: Martin Marietta

End of mission
- Deactivated: 18 October 1984

Orbital parameters
- Reference system: Geocentric orbit
- Regime: Sun-synchronous orbit

USA-2 (also known as KH-9 19) was an American reconnaissance satellite which was operated by the National Reconnaissance Office. Launched in June 1984, it was the last successful KH-9 reconnaissance satellite launch.

== Overview ==
KH-9 HEXAGON was a film-return type reconnaissance satellite which replaced the KH-8 Gambit 3 and KH-11 KENNEN the Successor of KH-9. KH-9 featured four SRV return capsule and a vastly improved camera compared to other film-based KH Satellites.

KH-9 19 also carried the SSF-D (Farrah-2 or USA-3) ELINT Satellite and STP S85-1 (HVP-III) Payload.

== KH-9 20 ==
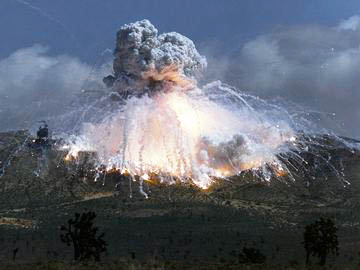
Titan-III failed just after liftoff due to SRB failure destroying KH-9 20 spacecraft

KH-9 20 was the last KH-9 HEXAGON satellite to be launched. The satellite launched on 18 April 1986 but due to Titan 34D Solid rocket motor exploded at T+8 seconds due to booster segment joint failure it failed to reach orbit. KH-9 20 was also carrying Pearl Ruby Technology demonstration satellite with a host of other payloads like STP S86-1 (RADC 801), GPSPAC 3, RDBS/Lorri 2 and Onyx.

== See also ==
- List of USA satellites
