= USA-263 =

US military communications satellite

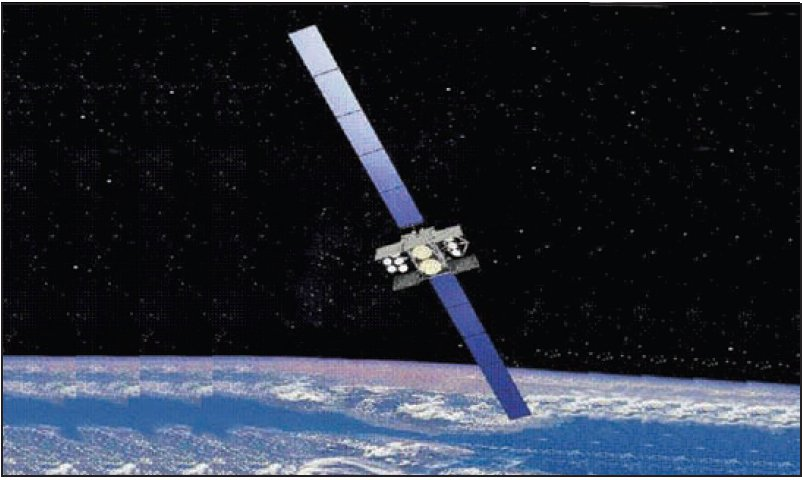
- Artist's impression of a WGS-7 satellite in orbit
- Names: WGS-7; WGS SV-7; Wideband Global SATCOM-7
- Mission type: Military communications
- Operator: United States Air Force / United States Space Force
- COSPAR ID: 2015-036A
- SATCAT no.: 40746
- Website: https://www.spaceforce.mil/
- Mission duration: 14 years (planned); 9 years, 8 months and 2 days (in progress)

Spacecraft properties
- Spacecraft: WGS-7
- Spacecraft type: WGS Block II
- Bus: BSS-702HP
- Manufacturer: Boeing Satellite Systems
- Launch mass: 5,987 kg (13,199 lb)
- Dry mass: 3,000 kg (6,600 lb)
- Power: 11 kW

Start of mission
- Launch date: 24 July 2015, 00:07 UTC
- Rocket: Delta IV M+ (5,4) (s/n D372)
- Launch site: Cape Canaveral, SLC-37B
- Contractor: United Launch Alliance

Orbital parameters
- Reference system: Geocentric orbit
- Regime: Geostationary orbit

Transponders
- Band: X-band and Ka-band
- Frequency: 7.2 / 8.4 GHz (X-band); 30 / 20 GHz (Ka-band)
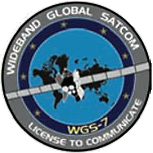
- Wideband Global SATCOM Satellite constellation

USA-263, or Wideband Global SATCOM 7 (WGS-7) is a United States military communications satellite operated by the United States Air Force as part of the Wideband Global SATCOM programme. Launched in 2015, it was the seventh WGS satellite to reach orbit. It is stationed at a longitude of 135° West, in geostationary orbit. WGS-7 was procured by the United States Air Force.

== Overview ==
The WGS system is composed of three principal segments: Space Segment (satellites), Control Segment (operators) and Terminal Segment (users). Each WGS satellite provides service in multiple frequency bands, with the unprecedented ability to cross-band between the two frequencies on board the satellite. WGS augments other satellites.

In early 2001, a satellite communications industry team led by Boeing Satellite Systems was selected to develop the Wideband Gapfiller Satellite (WGS) system as successors to the Defense Satellite Communications System (DSCS) series of communications satellites. This satellite communications system is intended to support the warfighter with newer and far greater capabilities than provided by current systems. In March 2007, the acronym WGS was changed to Wideband Global SATCOM.

Just one WGS satellite provides more SATCOM capacity than the entire legacy Defense Satellite Communications System (DSCS) constellation.

WGS provides worldwide communications for the Department of Defense (DOD), governmental organizations and international partners.

== Satellite description ==
The order for long lead items for WGS-7 was placed in August 2010. The final contract for this satellite was awarded in September 2011, together with long lead items for WGS-8 and an option for WGS-9. Built by Boeing Satellite Systems, WGS-7 is based on the BSS-702HP satellite bus. It had a mass at launch of 5,987 kg (13,199 lb), and was expected to operate for fourteen years. The spacecraft is equipped with two solar panels to generate power for its communications payload, which consists of cross-band X-band and Ka-band transponders. Propulsion is provided by an R-4D-15 apogee motor, with four XIPS-25 ion engines for stationkeeping.

== Launch ==
WGS-7 was launched by United Launch Alliance (ULA), who placed it into orbit using a Delta IV M+ (5,4) launch vehicle, flight number D372. The launch took place from Space Launch Complex 37B (SLC-37B) at the Cape Canaveral Air Force Station (CCAFS), with liftoff at 00:07 UTC on 24 July 2015. The launch was successful, placing the WGS-7 into a geostationary transfer orbit (GTO), from which the spacecraft raised itself into geostationary orbit using its onboard propulsion system. The satellite was designated USA-263 under the U.S. military's designation system, and received the International Designator 2015-036A and Satellite Catalog Number 40746.
