= MiTEx =

Microsatellite-based technology demonstration mission of the United States

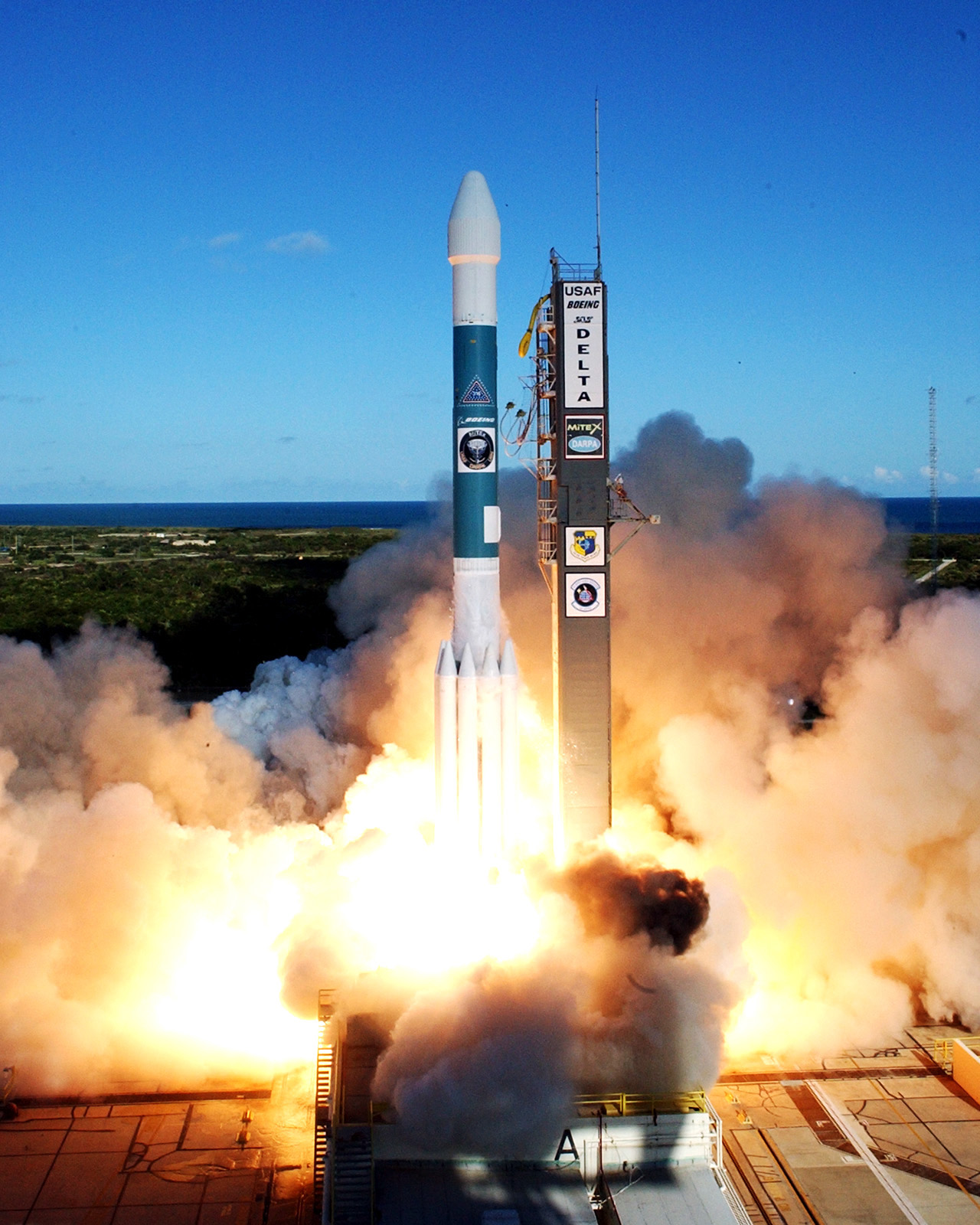
MiTEx launching from CCAFS on a Delta II.

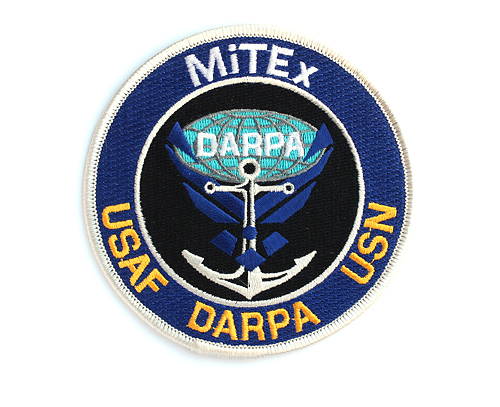
MiTEx mission patch

The Micro-satellite Technology Experiment (MiTEx) is a microsatellite-based mission launched into geosynchronous orbit 21 June 2006 aboard a Delta II rocket. The USAF described the mission as a joint "technology demonstration" mission for the Defense Advanced Research Projects Agency (DARPA), the United States Air Force (USAF) and the United States Navy (US Navy).

MiTEx consists of three spacecraft; two inspection satellites, designated USA-187 and USA-188, and an experimental upper stage, designated USA-189. The two inspection satellites were initially used to inspect each other; however, they were later used to inspect DSP-23, a failed missile detection satellite, to find out why it stopped operating.

The MiTEx goal was to demonstrate technologies such as lightweight power and propulsion systems, avionics, structures, commercial off-the-shelf components, advanced communications, and on-orbit software environments.

== Development ==
MiTEx was developed with funding from the Microsatellite Demonstration Science and Technology Experiment Program (MiDSTEP). Funding for MiDSTEP (and thus MiTEx) is allocated to DARPA through the "Space Programs and Technology" element of the United States Department of Defense (DoD) "Advanced Technology Development" budget item. DoD budget documents from February 2008 show costs of MiDSTEP in 2007 of US$8 million, in 2008 of US$10 million, and in 2009 of US$8 million. Owen C. Brown was the program manager for the design, integration, test, launch, and demonstration of MiTEx, while he was a program manager in the Tactical Technology Office (TTO) at DARPA.

== Launch ==
The satellites were launched from Cape Canaveral Space Launch Complex 17 on 21 June 2006 at 21:34 UTC using a Delta II carrier rocket flying in a 7925-9.5 configuration. The two inspection satellites were lifted to geosynchronous orbit by a fourth stage of a new, experimental design. The stage was developed at the United States Naval Research Laboratory (USNRL), and it is reportedly equipped with photovoltaic arrays for power.

== Mission ==
Because of their small dimensions (with a mass of 225 kilograms (496 lb) each), the satellites are hard to detect in their geosynchronous orbit, and thus could approach and examine other satellites without being noticed. After completion of their primary mission, the satellites were parked on opposite sides of Earth. During the 2nd week of January 2009, the MiTEx satellites were commanded to approach DSP-23, which had failed two months earlier, and had started to drift by 1° East from its own parking position at 8.5° East. The MiTEx satellite parked over the mid-Atlantic rendezvoused with DSP-23 around 23 December 2008, followed by the 2nd MiTEx satellite one week later.

== See also ==
- Space Based Space Surveillance
- XSS-11
