= Space Based Space Surveillance =

American military space surveillance program

The Space Based Space Surveillance (SBSS) system is a planned United States Space Force constellation of satellites and supporting ground infrastructure that will improve the ability of the United States Department of Defense (DoD) to detect and track space objects in orbit around the Earth.

The SBSS development work is being conducted in coordination with the Space Situational Awareness Group in the Space Superiority Systems Wing of the Space and Missile Systems Center.

== Pathfinder satellite ==
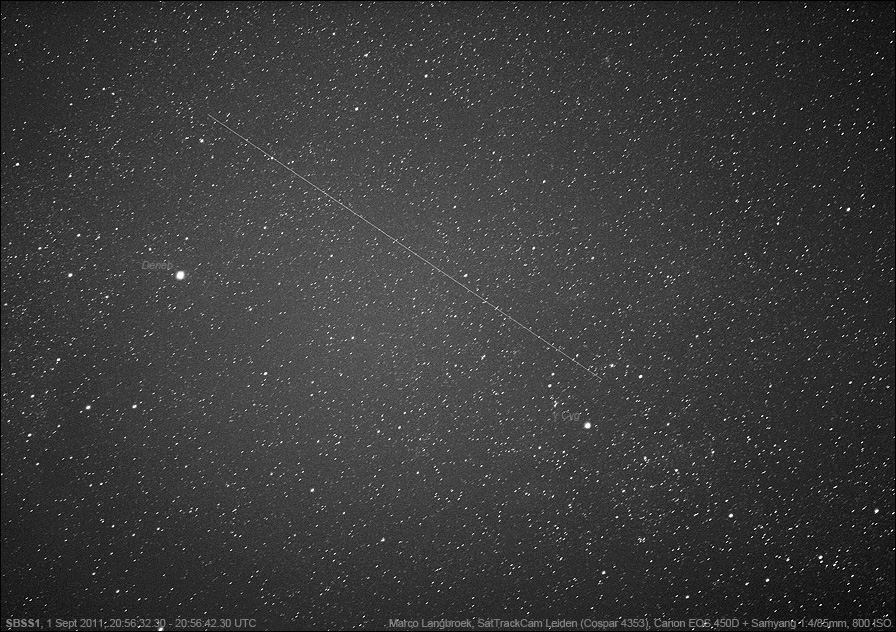
SBSS 1 (2010-048A), the first of the SBSS satellites, passing through Cygnus on 1 September 2011

The first "pathfinder" satellite of the SBSS system (SBSS 1, aka USA 216, COSPAR 2010-048A, SATCAT 37168) was successfully placed into orbit on board a Minotaur IV rocket on 26 September 2010 (UTC). Originally, the launch was scheduled for December 2008 but was rescheduled for Spring of 2009, and again delayed until 22 October 2009. The launch delays were caused by problems with the booster, and not the satellite itself. A launch expected for 8 July 2010 was also postponed. The program cost US$823 million, including satellite, payload, launch, and ground support. The satellite and payload contracts to Ball Aerospace & Technologies are approximately 40% of the total. It is designed to examine every spacecraft in geosynchronous orbit at least once a day.

The SBSS pathfinder satellite has a 30 cm telescope on a two-axis gimbal with a 2.4 megapixel image sensor and has a projected mission duration of five and a half years.

== See also ==
- Air Force Space Surveillance System
- MiTEx
