= List of Delta IV Medium launches =

Since November 2002, rockets from the Delta IV Medium family have been launched 29 times, all of which were successful. Its last flight was with a 3rd generation GPS satellite in August 2019.

== Delta IV Medium configurations ==
The Delta IV Medium (also referred to as 'single stick') was available in four configurations: Medium, Medium+ (4,2), Medium+ (5,2), and Medium+ (5,4).

- Delta IV Medium, coded Delta 9040, was the most basic Delta IV. It featured a single CBC and a modified Delta 3 second stage, with 4-meter liquid hydrogen and liquid oxygen tanks (called a Delta Cryogenic Second Stage (DCSS)) and a 4-meter payload fairing. The Delta IV Medium was capable of launching 4,200 kg to geostationary transfer orbit (GTO). From Cape Canaveral, GTO is 1804 m/s away from GEO. The mass of fairing and payload attach fittings have been subtracted from the gross performance.
- Delta IV Medium+ (4,2), coded Delta 9240, had the same CBC and DCSS as the Medium, but with the addition of two Orbital ATK-built 1.5-m (60-in) diameter solid rocket booster Graphite-Epoxy Motors (GEM-60s) strap-on boosters to increase payload capacity to 6,150 kg to GTO.
- Delta IV Medium+ (5,2), coded Delta 9250, was similar to the Medium+ (4,2), but had a 5-m–diameter DCSS and payload fairing for larger payloads. Because of the extra weight of the larger payload fairing and second stage, the Medium+ (5,2) could launch 5,072 kg to GTO.
- Delta IV Medium+ (5,4), coded Delta 9450, was similar to the Medium+ (5,2), but used four GEM-60s instead of two, enabling it to lift 6,882 kg to GTO.

To encapsulate the satellite payload, a variety of different payload fairings were available. A stretched Delta III 4-meter diameter composite payload fairing was used on 4-meter Medium versions, while an enlarged, 5-meter diameter composite fairing was used on 5-meter Medium versions.

The Medium (4,2) version last flew on 22 August 2019, marking the retirement of the Delta IV Medium variants.

== Launch Statistics ==
=== Rocket configurations ===
- Medium
- Medium+ (4,2)
- Medium+ (5,2)
- Medium+ (5,4)

=== Launch sites ===
- Cape Canaveral SLC-37B
- Vandenberg SLC-6

=== Orbits ===
- GTO
- Molniya
- SSO
- MEO
- GEO

=== Customers ===
- Eutelsat
- USAF
- NASA
- NOAA
- NRO
- DoD
- AFRL

== Launch history ==
Flight	Date / time (UTC)	Rocket Configuration	Launch site	Payload	Payload mass	Orbit	Customer	Launch outcome
1	November 20, 2002; 22:39	Delta IV Medium+ (4,2)	CCAFS SLC-37B	Eutelsat W5	3,086 pounds (1,400 kilograms)	GTO	Eutelsat	Success
1	First Delta IV launch, Commercial communications satellite							
2	March 11, 2003; 00:59	Delta IV Medium	CCAFS SLC-37B	USA-167 (DSCS-3 A3)	Classified	GTO	US Air Force	Success
2	Military communications satellite, First Delta IV Medium launch, First USAF EELV mission							
3	August 29, 2003; 23:13	Delta IV Medium	CCAFS SLC-37B	USA-170 (DSCS-3 B6)	Classified	GTO	US Air Force	Success
3	Military communications satellite							
4	May 24, 2006; 22:11	Delta IV Medium+ (4,2)	CCAFS SLC-37B	GOES-N (GOES-13)	6,908 pounds (3,133 kilograms)	GTO	NASA/NOAA	Success
4	First Delta IV launch for NASA, Weather satellite							
5	June 28, 2006; 03:33	Delta IV Medium+ (4,2)	VAFB SLC-6	NROL-22	Classified	Molniya	US NRO	Success
5	First Delta IV launch from Vandenberg, Reconnaissance satellite							
6	November 4, 2006; 13:53	Delta IV Medium	VAFB SLC-6	DMSP F17	Classified	SSO	DoD	Success
6	First Delta IV launch into a LEO/SSO, Military weather satellite							
7	June 27, 2009; 22:51	Delta IV Medium+ (4,2)	CCAFS SLC-37B	GOES-O (GOES-14)	6,908 pounds (3,133 kilograms)	GTO	NASA/NOAA	Success
7	Weather satellite							
8	December 6, 2009; 01:47	Delta IV Medium+ (5,4)	CCAFS SLC-37B	USA-211 (WGS-3)	13,199 pounds (5,987 kilograms)	GTO	US Air Force	Success
8	First Delta IV Medium+ (5,4) launch, Communication satellite							
9	4 March 2010; 23:57	Delta IV Medium+ (4,2)	CCAFS SLC-37B	GOES-P (GOES-15)	7,139 pounds (3,238 kilograms)	GTO	NASA	Success
9	NOAA Weather satellite in the Geostationary Operational Environmental Satellite (GOES) program. Replaced GOES-11 as the GOES West satellite.							
10	28 May 2010; 03:00	Delta IV Medium+ (4,2)	CCAFS SLC-37B	USA-213 (GPS IIF SV-1)	3,594 pounds (1,630 kilograms)	MEO	US Air Force	Success
10	Navigation satellite							
11	11 March 2011; 23:38	Delta IV Medium+ (4,2)	CCAFS SLC-37B	USA-227 (NROL-27)	5,148 pounds (2335 kilograms)	GTO	US NRO	Success
11	Military comsat.							
12	16 July 2011; 06:41	Delta IV Medium+ (4,2)	CCAFS SLC-37B	USA-232 (GPS IIF-2)	3,594 pounds (1,630 kilograms)	MEO	US Air Force	Success
12	Navigation satellite							
13	20 January 2012 00:38	Delta IV Medium+ (5,4)	CCAFS SLC-37B	USA-233 (WGS-4)	13,199 pounds (5,987 kilograms)	GTO	US Air Force	Success
13	Military comsat							
14	3 April 2012; 23:12	Delta IV Medium+ (5,2)	VAFB SLC-6	USA-234 (NROL-25)	Classified	LEO	US NRO	Success
14	First Delta IV Medium+ (5,2) launch, Reconnaissance satellite							
15	4 October 2012; 12:10	Delta IV Medium+ (4,2)	CCAFS SLC-37B	USA-239 (GPS IIF-3)	3,594 pounds (1,630 kilograms)	MEO	US Air Force	Success
15	Upper stage anomaly, Satellite navigation							
16	25 May 2013; 00:27	Delta IV Medium+ (5,4)	CCAFS SLC-37B	USA-243 (WGS-5)	13,199 pounds (5,987 kilograms)	GTO	US Air Force	Success
16	Military comsat							
17	8 August 2013; 00:29	Delta IV Medium+ (5,4)	CCAFS, SLC-37B	USA-244 (WGS-6)	13,199 pounds (5,987 kilograms)	GTO	US Air Force	Success
17	Military comsat							
18	21 February 2014; 01:59	Delta IV Medium+ (4,2)	CCAFS SLC-37B	USA-248 (GPS IIF-5)	3,594 pounds (1,630 kilograms)	MEO	US Air Force	Success
18	25th Delta IV launch, Satellite navigation							
19	17 May 2014; 00:03	Delta IV Medium+ (4,2)	CCAFS SLC-37B	USA-251 (GPS IIF-6)	3,594 pounds (1,630 kilograms)	MEO	US Air Force	Success
19	Navigation satellite							
20	28 July 2014; 23:28	Delta IV Medium+ (4,2)	CCAFS SLC-37B	USA 253-255 (AFSPC-4 (GSSAP #1/#2/ANGELS))	Classified	GEO	DoD/AFRL	Success
20	Space surveillance / Technology demonstration							
21	25 March 2015; 18:36	Delta IV Medium+ (4,2)	CCAFS SLC-37B	USA-260 (GPS IIF-9)	3,594 pounds (1,630 kilograms)	MEO	US Air Force	Success
21	Final launch of baseline RS-68 engine, Navigation satellite							
22	24 July 2015; 00:07	Delta IV Medium+ (5,4)	CCAFS SLC-37B	USA-263 (WGS-7)	13,199 pounds (5,987 kilograms)	GTO	DoD	Success
22	Second flight with an RS-68A engine; New standard for Delta IV rockets, Military comsat							
23	10 February 2016, 11:40	Delta IV Medium+ (5,2)	VAFB SLC-6	USA-267 (NROL-45)	Classified	LEO	US NRO	Success
23	Reconnaissance satellite							
24	19 August 2016; 04:52	Delta IV Medium+ (4,2)	CCAFS SLC-37B	USA-270/271 (AFSPC-6 (GSSAP #3/#4))	Classified	GEO	DoD	Success
24	Space surveillance satellite							
25	7 December 2016 23:53	Delta IV Medium+ (5,4)	CCAFS SLC-37B	USA-272 (WGS-8)	13,199 pounds (5,987 kilograms)	GTO	DoD	Success
25	Military comsat							
26	19 March 2017; 00:18	Delta IV Medium+ (5,4)	CCAFS SLC-37B	USA-275 (WGS-9)	13,199 pounds (5,987 kilograms)	GTO	DoD	Success
26	Military comsat							
27	12 January 2018; 22:11	Delta IV Medium+ (5,2)	VAFB SLC-6	USA-281 (NROL-47)	Classified	LEO	US NRO	Success
27	Final flight of Delta IV M+(5,2) variant. Reconnaissance satellite.							
28	16 March 2019; 00:26	Delta IV Medium+ (5,4)	CCAFS, SLC-37B	USA-291 (WGS-10)	13,199 pounds (5,987 kilograms)	GTO	DoD	Success
28	Final flight of Delta IV M+(5,4) variant. Military comsat.							
29	22 August 2019; 13:06	Delta IV Medium+ (4,2)	CCAFS, SLC-37B	USA-293 (GPS III-2)	8,168 pounds (3,705 kilograms)	MEO	US Air Force	Success
29	Final flight of Delta IV M+(4,2) variant. 3rd generation Global Positioning Satellite (GPS)							

== See also ==
- List of Delta IV launches
- List of Delta IV Heavy launches
- List of Thor and Delta launches
- List of Thor and Delta launches (2000-2009)
- List of Thor and Delta launches (2010-2019)
- Delta (rocket family)
- Delta IV Medium
- Delta IV Heavy
- Delta IV
