= List of Delta IV launches =

Delta IV was a group of five expendable launch systems in the Delta rocket family introduced in the early 2000s. Originally designed by Boeing's Defense, Space and Security division for the Evolved Expendable Launch Vehicle (EELV) program, the Delta IV became a United Launch Alliance (ULA) product in 2006. The Delta IV was primarily a launch vehicle for United States Air Force (USAF) military payloads, but was also used to launch a number of United States government non-military payloads and a single commercial satellite.

The Delta IV originally had two main versions which allowed the family to cover a range of payload sizes and masses: the Medium (which had four configurations) and Heavy. Since September 2019, only the Heavy remained active, with payloads that would previously fly on Medium moving to either the existing Atlas V or the forthcoming Vulcan. Retirement of the Delta IV occurred in 2024.

Delta IV vehicles were built in the ULA facility in Decatur, Alabama. Final assembly was completed at the launch site by ULA: at the horizontal integration facility for launches from SLC-37B pad at Cape Canaveral and in a similar facility for launches from SLC-6 pad at Vandenberg Air Force Base.

== Launch statistics ==
=== Launch outcome ===
- Partial Failure
- Success

=== Launch site ===
- Cape Canaveral SLC-37B
- Vandenberg SLC-6

=== Vehicle ===
- Delta IV Medium
- Delta IV Heavy

== Launch history ==
Flight	Date / time (UTC)	Launch site	Payload	Rocket	Launch outcome
1	20 November 2002	Cape Canaveral, SLC-37B	Eutelsat W5	Delta IV Medium	Success
2	11 March 2003	Cape Canaveral, SLC-37B	USA-167 (DSCS-3 A3)	Delta IV Medium	Success
3	29 August 2003	Cape Canaveral, SLC-37B	USA-170 (DSCS-3 B6)	Delta IV Medium	Success
4	21 December 2004	Cape Canaveral, SLC-37B	DemoSat, Sparkie / 3CS-1 and Ralphie / 3CS-2	Delta IV Heavy	Partial failure (Note: CBCs underperformed, lower orbit than planned)
5	24 May 2006	Cape Canaveral, SLC-37B	GOES-N (GOES-13)	Delta IV Medium	Success
6	28 June 2006	Vandenberg, SLC-6	USA-184 (NROL-22)	Delta IV Medium	Success
7	4 November 2006	Vandenberg, SLC-6	DMSP F17	Delta IV Medium	Success
8	11 November 2007	Cape Canaveral, SLC-37B	DSP-23 Defense Support Program	Delta IV Heavy	Success
9	18 January 2009	Cape Canaveral, SLC-37B	Orion 6 / Mentor 4 (USA-202 / NROL-26)	Delta IV Heavy	Success
10	27 June 2009	Cape Canaveral, SLC-37B	GOES-O (GOES-14)	Delta IV Medium	Success
11	6 December 2009	Cape Canaveral, SLC-37B	USA-211 (WGS-3)	Delta IV Medium	Success
12	4 March 2010	Cape Canaveral, SLC-37B	GOES-P (GOES-15)	Delta IV Medium	Success
13	28 May 2010	Cape Canaveral, SLC-37B	USA-213 (GPS IIF SV-1)	Delta IV Medium	Success
14	21 November 2010	Cape Canaveral, SLC-37B	Orion 7 / Mentor 5 (USA-223 / NROL-32)	Delta IV Heavy	Success
15	20 January 2011	Vandenberg, SLC-6	KH-11 Kennen 15 (USA-224 / NROL-49)	Delta IV Heavy	Success
16	11 March 2011	Cape Canaveral, SLC-37B	USA-227 (NROL-27)	Delta IV Medium	Success
17	16 July 2011	Cape Canaveral, SLC-37B	USA-232 (GPS IIF-2)	Delta IV Medium	Success
18	20 January 2012	Cape Canaveral, SLC-37B	USA-233 (WGS-4)	Delta IV Medium	Success
19	3 April 2012	Vandenberg, SLC-6	USA-234 (NROL-25)	Delta IV Medium	Success
20	29 June 2012	Cape Canaveral, SLC-37B	Orion 8 / Mentor 6 (USA-237 / NROL-15)	Delta IV Heavy	Success
21	4 October 2012	Cape Canaveral, SLC-37B	USA-239 (GPS IIF-3)	Delta IV Medium	Success
22	25 May 2013	Cape Canaveral, SLC-37B	USA-243 (WGS-5)	Delta IV Medium	Success
23	8 August 2013	Cape Canaveral, SLC-37B	USA-244 (WGS-6)	Delta IV Medium	Success
24	26 August 2013	Vandenberg, SLC-6	KH-11 Kennen 16 (USA-245 / NROL-65)	Delta IV Heavy	Success
25	21 February 2014	Cape Canaveral, SLC-37B	USA-248 (GPS IIF-5)	Delta IV Medium	Success
26	17 May 2014	Cape Canaveral, SLC-37B	USA-251 (GPS IIF-6)	Delta IV Medium	Success
27	28 July 2014	Cape Canaveral, SLC-37B	USA 253-255 (AFSPC-4 (GSSAP #1/#2/ANGELS))	Delta IV Medium	Success
28	5 December 2014	Cape Canaveral, SLC-37B	Orion Exploration Flight Test-1 (EFT-1)	Delta IV Heavy	Success
29	25 March 2015	Cape Canaveral, SLC-37B	USA-260 (GPS IIF-9)	Delta IV Medium	Success
30	24 July 2015	Cape Canaveral, SLC-37B	USA-263 (WGS-7)	Delta IV Medium	Success
31	10 February 2016	Vandenberg, SLC-6	USA-267 (NROL-45)	Delta IV Medium	Success
32	11 June 2016	Cape Canaveral, SLC-37B	Orion 9 / Mentor 7 (USA-268 / NROL-37)	Delta IV Heavy	Success
33	19 August 2016	Cape Canaveral, SLC-37B	USA-270/271 (AFSPC-6 (GSSAP #3/#4))	Delta IV Medium	Success
34	7 December 2016	Cape Canaveral, SLC-37B	USA-272 (WGS-8)	Delta IV Medium	Success
35	19 March 2017	Cape Canaveral, SLC-37B	USA-275 (WGS-9)	Delta IV Medium	Success
36	12 January 2018	Vandenberg, SLC-6	USA-281 (NROL-47)	Delta IV Medium	Success
37	12 August 2018	Cape Canaveral, SLC-37B	Parker Solar Probe (Note: Star 48BV upper stage)	Delta IV Heavy	Success
38	19 January 2019	Vandenberg, SLC-6	KH-11 Kennen 17 (NROL-71)	Delta IV Heavy	Success
39	16 March 2019	Cape Canaveral, SLC-37B	USA-291 (WGS-10)	Delta IV Medium	Success
40	22 August 2019	Cape Canaveral, SLC-37B	USA-293 (GPS III-2)	Delta IV Medium	Success
41	11 December 2020	Cape Canaveral, SLC-37B	Orion 10 / Mentor 8 (USA-268 / NROL-44)	Delta IV Heavy	Success
42	26 April 2021	Vandenberg, SLC-6	KH-11 Kennen 18 (NROL-82)	Delta IV Heavy	Success
43	24 September 2022	Vandenberg, SLC-6	KH-11 Kennen 18 (NROL-91)	Delta IV Heavy	Success
44	22 June 2023	Cape Canaveral, SLC-37B	Orion 11 / Mentor 9 (NROL-68)	Delta IV Heavy	Success
45	9 April 2024	Cape Canaveral, SLC-37B	Orion 12 / Mentor 10 (NROL-70)	Delta IV Heavy	Success
