= List of Thor and Delta launches (2010–2019) =

As of October 2018, only the Delta IV remains in production. Single-stick versions of Delta IV was retired by United Launch Alliance (ULA) in 2019 and replaced by the ULA Atlas V, leaving the Delta IV Heavy the only remaining operational member of the Delta family, flying US national security missions.

== Launch statistics ==
=== Rocket configurations ===
- Delta II (7000)
- Delta II (7000H)
- Delta IV Medium+ (4,2)
- Delta IV Medium+ (5,2)
- Delta IV Medium+ (5,4)
- Delta IV Heavy

=== Launch sites ===
- Cape Canaveral SLC-17B
- Cape Canaveral SLC-37B
- Vandenberg SLC-2W
- Vandenberg SLC-6

== Launch history ==
=== 2010 ===
Flight No.	Date / time (UTC)	Rocket, Configuration	Launch site	Payload	Payload mass	Orbit	Customer	Launch outcome
348	4 March 2010; 23:57	Delta IV M+ (4,2)	CCAFS SLC-37B	GOES-P (GOES-15)	3,238 kg	GTO	NASA	Success
348	NOAA Weather satellite in the Geostationary Operational Environmental Satellite (GOES) program. Replaced GOES-11 as the GOES West satellite.							
349	28 May 2010; 03:00	Delta IV M+ (4,2)	CCAFS SLC-37B	USA-213 (GPS IIF SV-1)	1,630 kg	MEO	US Air Force	Success
349	Navigation satellite							
350	6 November 2010; 02:20	Delta II 7420-10C	VAFB SLC-2W	COSMO-4	1,900 kg	SSO	Italian Space Agency	Success
350	Earth imaging / One of four reconnaissance and Earth observation satellites. The satellite's imagery will be applied to defense and security assurance in Italy and other countries, seismic hazard analysis, environmental disaster monitoring, and agricultural mapping.							
351	21 November 2010; 22:58	Delta IV Heavy	CCAFS SLC-37B	USA-223 (NROL-32)	Classified	GEO	US NRO	Success
351	ELINT satellite							
=== 2011 ===
Flight No.	Date / time (UTC)	Rocket, Configuration	Launch site	Payload	Payload mass	Orbit	Customer	Launch outcome
352	20 January 2011; 21:10	Delta IV Heavy	VAFB SLC-6	USA-224 (NROL-49)	19,600 kg	LEO	US NRO	Success
352	Reconnaissance satellite. First Delta IV Heavy launch from Vandenberg							
353	11 March 2011; 23:38	Delta IV M+ (4,2)	CCAFS SLC-37B	USA-227 (NROL-27)	2335 kg	GTO	US NRO	Success
353	Military comsat.							
354	10 June 2011; 14:20	Delta II 7320-10C	VAFB SLC-2W	SAC-D	1,350 kg	SSO	CONAE / NASA	Success
354	A technology demonstration and Earth observation satellite. The launch was delayed from May 2010 because development of the spacecraft was taking longer than expected.							
355	16 July 2011; 06:41	Delta IV M+ (4,2)	CCAFS SLC-37B	USA-232 (GPS IIF-2)	1,630 kg	MEO	US Air Force	Success
355	Navigation satellite							
356	10 September 2011; 13:08	Delta II 7920H-10C	CCAFS SLC-17B	GRAIL	307 kg	Lunar orbit	NASA/JPL	Success
356	Final Delta II Heavy launch and final launch from SLC-17 at CCAFS. Part of NASA's Discovery Program which used high-quality gravitational field mapping of the Moon to determine its interior structure. The launch was delayed several days due to high level winds and an issue with the rocket's propulsion system that was detected while the Delta 2 rocket was drained of fuel.							
357	28 October 2011; 09:48	Delta II 7920-10C	VAFB SLC-2W	Suomi NPP / ELaNa III	1,400 kg	SSO	NASA / NOAA / DoD	Success
357	A weather satellite that acts as a bridge between POES satellites and the Joint Polar Satellite System. The satellite measures climate data. The launch also included the secondary payload ELaNa III, 5 CubeSats that are part of the Educational Launch of Nanosatellites NASA program.							
=== 2012 ===
Flight No.	Date / time (UTC)	Rocket, Configuration	Launch site	Payload	Payload mass	Orbit	Customer	Launch outcome
358	20 January 2012; 00:38	Delta IV M+ (5,4)	CCAFS SLC-37B	USA-233 (WGS-4)	5,987 kg	GTO	US Air Force	Success
358	Military comsat							
359	3 April 2012; 23:12	Delta IV M+ (5,2)	VAFB SLC-6	USA-234 (NROL-25)	Classified	LEO	US NRO	Success
359	First Delta IV Medium+ (5,2) launch, Reconnaissance satellite							
360	29 June 2012; 13:15	Delta IV Heavy	CCAFS SLC-37B	USA-237 (NROL-15)	Classified	GSO	US NRO	Success
360	First flight with RS-68A engines, ELINT satellite							
361	4 October 2012; 12:10	Delta IV M+ (4,2)	CCAFS SLC-37B	USA-239 (GPS IIF-3)	1,630 kg	MEO	US Air Force	Success
361	Upper stage anomaly, Satellite navigation							
=== 2013 ===
Flight No.	Date / time (UTC)	Rocket, Configuration	Launch site	Payload	Payload mass	Orbit	Customer	Launch outcome
362	25 May 2013; 00:27	Delta IV M+ (5,4)	CCAFS SLC-37B	USA-243 (WGS-5)	5,987 kg	GTO	US Air Force	Success
362	Military comsat							
363	8 August 2013; 00:29	Delta IV M+ (5,4)	CCAFS, SLC-37B	USA-244 (WGS-6)	5987 kg	GTO	US Air Force	Success
363	Military comsat							
364	28 August 2013; 18:03	Delta IV Heavy	VAFB, SLC-6	USA-245 (NROL-65)	Classified	LEO	US NRO	Success
364	First launch with staggered ignition sequence, new Delta IV Heavy launch standard, reconnaissance satellite.							
=== 2014 ===
Flight No.	Date / time (UTC)	Rocket, Configuration	Launch site	Payload	Payload mass	Orbit	Customer	Launch outcome
365	21 February 2014; 01:59	Delta IV M+ (4,2)	CCAFS SLC-37B	USA-248 (GPS IIF-5)	1,630 kg	MEO	US Air Force	Success
365	25th Delta IV launch, Satellite navigation							
366	17 May 2014; 00:03	Delta IV M+ (4,2)	CCAFS SLC-37B	USA-251 (GPS IIF-6)	1,630 kg	MEO	US Air Force	Success
366	Navigation satellite							
367	2 July 2014; 09:56	Delta II 7320-10C	VAFB SLC-2W	OCO-2	454 kg	SSO	NASA	Success
367	Climate research satellite being used to study carbon dioxide concentrations and distributions in the atmosphere. The initial launch attempt on 1 July at 09:56:44 UTC was scrubbed at 46 seconds on the countdown clock due to a faulty valve on the water suppression system, used to flow water on the launch pad to dampen the acoustic energy during launch.							
368	28 July 2014; 23:28	Delta IV M+ (4,2)	CCAFS SLC-37B	USA-253/254/255 (AFSPC-4 (GSSAP #1/#2/ANGELS))	Classified	GEO	DoD/AFRL	Success
368	Space surveillance / Technology demonstration							
369	5 December 2014; 12:05	Delta IV Heavy	CCAFS SLC-37B	EFT-1	25,848 kg	MEO	NASA	Success
369	First Delta IV Heavy launch for NASA. The mission was a four-hour, two-orbit test of the Orion Multi-Purpose Crew Vehicle. The launch was delayed several hours due to weather and technical reasons.							
=== 2015 ===
Flight No.	Date / time (UTC)	Rocket, Configuration	Launch site	Payload	Payload mass	Orbit	Customer	Launch outcome
370	31 January 2015; 14:22	Delta II 7320-10C	VAFB SLC-2W	SMAP/ELaNa X	944 kg	SSO	NASA	Success
370	Final launch of Delta II 7300 series. Environmental research satellite. SMAP provides measurements of the land surface soil moisture and freeze-thaw state with near-global revisit coverage in 2–3 days. The launch also included the secondary payload ELaNa X, 3 CubeSats that are part of the Educational Launch of Nanosatellites NASA program.							
371	25 March 2015; 18:36	Delta IV M+ (4,2)	CCAFS SLC-37B	USA-260 (GPS IIF-9)	1,630 kg	MEO	US Air Force	Success
371	Final launch of baseline RS-68 engine, Navigation satellite							
372	24 July 2015; 00:07	Delta IV M+ (5,4)	CCAFS SLC-37B	USA-263 (WGS-7)	5,987 kg	GTO	DoD	Success
372	Second flight with an RS-68A engine; New standard for Delta IV rockets, Military comsat							
=== 2016 ===
Flight No.	Date / time (UTC)	Rocket, Configuration	Launch site	Payload	Payload mass	Orbit	Customer	Launch outcome
373	10 February 2016, 11:40	Delta IV M+ (5,2)	VAFB SLC-6	USA-267 (NROL-45)	Classified	LEO	US NRO	Success
373	Reconnaissance satellite							
374	11 June 2016; 17:51	Delta IV Heavy	CCAFS SLC-37B	USA-268 (NROL-37)	Classified	GSO	US NRO	Success
374	Reconnaissance satellite							
375	19 August 2016; 04:52	Delta IV M+ (4,2)	CCAFS SLC-37B	USA-270/271 (AFSPC-6 (GSSAP #3/#4))	Classified	GEO	DoD	Success
375	Space surveillance satellite							
376	7 December 2016; 23:53	Delta IV M+ (5,4)	CCAFS SLC-37B	USA-272 (WGS-8)	5,987	GTO	DoD	Success
376	Military comsat							
=== 2017 ===
Flight No.	Date / time (UTC)	Rocket, Configuration	Launch site	Payload	Payload mass	Orbit	Customer	Launch outcome
377	19 March 2017; 00:18	Delta IV M+ (5,4)	CCAFS SLC-37B	USA-275 (WGS-9)	5,987 kg	GTO	DoD	Success
377	Military comsat							
378	18 November 2017; 09:47	Delta II 7920-10C	VAFB SLC-2W	JPSS-1/NOAA-20	2,540 kg	SSO	NOAA	Success
378	Final flight of the Delta II 7900 series. The NOAA-20 launch was delayed several times, from 2014 to 2017, due to various testing problems. First satellite of the JPSS series weather satellite system. JPSS will provide the global environmental data used in numerical weather prediction models for forecasts, and scientific data used for climate monitoring. Re-designated NOAA-20.							
=== 2018 ===
Flight No.	Date / time (UTC)	Rocket, Configuration	Launch site	Payload	Payload mass	Orbit	Customer	Launch outcome
379	12 January 2018; 22:11	Delta IV M+ (5,2)	VAFB SLC-6	USA-281 (NROL-47)	Classified	LEO	US NRO	Success
379	Final flight of Delta IV M+(5,2) variant. Reconnaissance satellite.							
380	12 August 2018, 07:31	Delta IV Heavy	CCAFS SLC-37B	Parker Solar Probe	685 kg	Heliocentric	NASA	Success
380	Only use of Delta IV Heavy with Star 48BV third stage (9255H). Heliophysics; 8.5 solar radii (5.9 million km) perihelion.							
381	15 September 2018, 13:02	Delta II 7420-10C	VAFB SLC-2W	ICESat-2	1,514 kg	LEO	NASA	Success
381	Final Delta II launch and final flight of a Thor-derived launch vehicle. 100th successful launch of a Delta II in a row. Earth science satellite.							
=== 2019 ===
Flight No.	Date / time (UTC)	Rocket, Configuration	Launch site	Payload	Payload mass	Orbit	Customer	Launch outcome
382	19 January 2019; 19:10	Delta IV Heavy	VAFB, SLC-6	USA-290 (NROL-71)	Classified	LEO	US NRO	Success
383	16 March 2019; 00:26	Delta IV M+ (5,4)	CCAFS, SLC-37B	USA-291 (WGS-10)	5,987 kg	GTO	DoD	Success
383	Final flight of Delta IV M+(5,4) variant. Military comsat.							
384	22 August 2019; 13:06	Delta IV M+ (4,2)	CCAFS, SLC-37B	USA-293 (GPS III-2)	3,705 kg	MEO	US Air Force	Success
384	Final flight of the single-stick Delta IV Medium configuration. Navigation satellite.							

== See also ==
- List of Atlas launches (2010–2019)
