= List of Atlas launches (2010–2019) =

== Launch statistics ==
=== Rocket configurations ===
- Atlas V 401
- Atlas V 411
- Atlas V 421
- Atlas V 431
- Atlas V 501
- Atlas V 531
- Atlas V 541
- Atlas V 551
- Atlas V N22

=== Launch sites ===
- Cape Canaveral SLC-41
- Vandenberg SLC-3E

=== Launch outcomes ===
- Failure
- Partial failure
- Success
- Scheduled

== Launch history ==
=== 2010 ===
Flight №	Date / time (UTC)	Rocket	Launch site	Payload	Payload mass	Orbit	Customer	Launch outcome
AV-021	February 11, 2010, 15:23	Atlas V 401	CCAFS SLC-41	Solar Dynamics Observatory	290 kg	GTO	NASA	Success
AV-021	NASA solar observatory.							
AV-012	April 22, 2010, 23:52	Atlas V 501	CCAFS SLC-41	USA-212 (X-37B OTV-1)	5,400 kg	LEO	US Air Force	Success
AV-012	Maiden flight of the Boeing X-37 military spaceplane; first flight of the Atlas V 501.							
AV-019	August 14, 2010, 11:07	Atlas V 531	CCAFS SLC-41	USA-214 (AEHF-1)	6,168 kg	GTO	US Air Force	Success
AV-019	First Advanced Extremely High Frequency satellite; first flight of the Atlas V 531.							
AV-025	September 21, 2010, 04:03	Atlas V 501	VAFB SLC-3E	USA-215 (NROL-41)	Classified	LEO	US NRO	Success
AV-025	Classified NRO payload.							
=== 2011 ===
Flight №	Date / time (UTC)	Rocket	Launch site	Payload	Payload mass	Orbit	Customer	Launch outcome
AV-026	March 5, 2011, 22:46	Atlas V 501	CCAFS SLC-41	USA-226 (X-37B OTV-2)	5,400 kg (X-37B OTV-2)	LEO	USAF	Success
AV-026	Second X-37B military spaceplane mission.							
AV-027	April 15, 2011, 04:24	Atlas V 411	VAFB SLC-3E	USA-229 (NROL-34)	Classified	LEO	NRO	Success
AV-027	Two Naval Ocean Surveillance System satellites.							
AV-022	May 7, 2011, 18:10	Atlas V 401	CCAFS SLC-41	USA-230 (SBIRS GEO-1)	~4,500 kg	GTO	USAF	Success
AV-022	First Space-Based Infrared System ballistic missile early warning satellite.							
AV-029	August 5, 2011, 16:25	Atlas V 551	CCAFS SLC-41	Juno	3,625 kg	Heliocentric	NASA	Success
AV-029	NASA Jupiter orbiter.							
AV-028	November 26, 2011, 15:02	Atlas V 541	CCAFS SLC-41	Mars Science Laboratory (MSL)	3,839 kg	Heliocentric	NASA	Success
AV-028	NASA Mars rover; first flight of Atlas V 541.							
=== 2012 ===
Flight №	Date / time (UTC)	Rocket	Launch site	Payload	Payload mass	Orbit	Customer	Launch outcome
AV-030	February 24, 2012, 22:15	Atlas V 551	CCAFS SLC-41	MUOS-1	6,740 kg	GTO	DoD	Success
AV-030	First Mobile User Objective System satellite; heaviest payload launched by Atlas V to date; 200th Centaur upper stage.							
AV-031	May 4, 2012, 18:42	Atlas V 531	CCAFS SLC-41	USA-235 (AEHF-2)	6,168 kg	GTO	US Air Force	Success
AV-031	Second Advanced Extremely High Frequency satellite.							
AV-023	June 20, 2012, 12:28	Atlas V 401	CCAFS SLC-41	USA-236 (NROL-38)	Classified	GTO	US NRO	Success
AV-023	Classified NRO payload; 50th EELV launch.							
AV-032	August 30, 2012, 08:05	Atlas V 401	CCAFS SLC-41	Van Allen Probes	3000 kg	Highly elliptical	NASA	Success
AV-032	Dual NASA probes to map the Van Allen radiation belt.							
AV-033	September 13, 2012, 21:39	Atlas V 401	VAFB SLC-3E	USA-238 (NROL-36) + 11 cubesats	Classified	LEO	NRO/NASA	Success
AV-033	Classified NRO main payload; additional eleven cubesats including four NASA ELeNa missions.							
AV-034	December 11, 2012, 18:03	Atlas V 501	CCAFS SLC-41	USA-240 (X-37B OTV-3)	5,400 kg (X-37B OTV-3)	LEO	US Air Force	Success
AV-034	Third flight of the X-37 military spaceplane.							
=== 2013 ===
Flight №	Date / time (UTC)	Rocket	Launch site	Payload	Payload mass	Orbit	Customer	Launch outcome
AV-036	January 31, 2013, 01:48	Atlas V 401	CCAFS SLC-41	TDRS-K (TDRS-11)	3,454 kg	GTO	NASA	Success
AV-036	Eleventh NASA Tracking and Data Relay Satellite.							
AV-035	February 11, 2013, 18:02	Atlas V 401	VAFB SLC-3E	Landsat 8	1,512 kg	LEO/SSO	USGS	Success
AV-035	Eighth Landsat geological survey satellite.							
AV-037	March 19, 2013, 21:21	Atlas V 401	CCAFS SLC-41	USA-241 (SBIRS GEO-2)	~4,500 kg	GTO	USAF	Success
AV-037	Second Space-Based Infrared System geostationary satellite.							
AV-039	May 15, 2013, 21:38	Atlas V 401	CCAFS SLC-41	USA-242 (GPS-IIF-4)	1,630 kg	MEO	USAF	Success
AV-039	Fourth GPS Block IIF navigation satellite.							
AV-040	July 19, 2013, 13:00	Atlas V 551	CCAFS SLC-41	MUOS-2	6,740 kg	GTO	DoD	Success
AV-040	Second Mobile User Objective System satellite; heaviest payload launched by an Atlas V to date.							
AV-041	September 18, 2013, 08:10	Atlas V 531	CCAFS SLC-41	USA-246 (AEHF-3)	6,168 kg	GTO	US Air Force	Success
AV-041	Third Advanced Extremely High Frequency communications satellite; 75th ULA launch.							
AV-038	November 18, 2013, 18:28	Atlas V 401	CCAFS SLC-41	MAVEN	2,454 kg	Heliocentric	NASA	Success
AV-038	NASA Mars atmospheric research probe.							
AV-042	December 6, 2013, 07:14	Atlas V 501	VAFB SLC-3E	USA-247 (NROL-39) + 12 cubesats	Classified	LEO	US NRO	Success
AV-042	Classified NRO payload; twelve cubesats.							
=== 2014 ===
Flight №	Date / time (UTC)	Rocket	Launch site	Payload	Payload mass	Orbit	Customer	Launch outcome
AV-043	January 24, 2014, 02:33	Atlas V 401	CCAFS SLC-41	TDRS-L (TDRS-12)	3,454 kg	GTO	NASA	Success
AV-043	Twelfth NASA Tracking and Data Relay Satellite.							
AV-044	April 3, 2014, 14:46	Atlas V 401	VAFB SLC-3E	USA-249 (DMSP F19)	~1,200 kg	SSO	DoD	Success
AV-044	Nineteenth Defense Meteorological Satellite Program weather satellite; 50th flight of an RD-180 engine.							
AV-045	April 10, 2014, 17:45	Atlas V 541	CCAFS SLC-41	USA-250 (NROL-67)	Classified	GSO	US NRO	Success
AV-045	Classified NRO payload.							
AV-046	May 22, 2014, 13:09	Atlas V 401	CCAFS SLC-41	USA-252 (NROL-33)	Classified	GTO	US NRO	Success
AV-046	Classified NRO payload.							
AV-048	August 2, 2014, 03:23	Atlas V 401	CCAFS SLC-41	USA-256 (GPS IIF-7)	1,630 kg	MEO	US Air Force	Success
AV-048	Seventh GPS Block IIF navigation satellite.							
AV-047	August 13, 2014, 18:30	Atlas V 401	VAFB SLC-3E	WorldView 3	2,800 kg	SSO	DigitalGlobe	Success
AV-047	DigitalGlobe earth observation satellite.							
AV-049	September 17, 2014, 00:10	Atlas V 401	CCAFS SLC-41	USA-257 (CLIO)	Classified	GTO		Success
AV-049	Second Nemesis COMINT transmission-intercepting satellite.							
AV-050	October 29, 2014, 17:21	Atlas V 401	CCAFS SLC-41	USA-258 (GPS IIF-8)	1,630 kg	MEO	US Air Force	Success
AV-050	Eighth GPS Block IIF navigation satellite. 50th Atlas V launch.							
AV-051	December 13, 2014, 03:19	Atlas V 541	VAFB SLC-3E	USA-259 (NROL-35)	Classified	Molniya	NRO	Success
AV-051	Classified NRO payload; first Centaur upper stage to use the RL10-C1.							
=== 2015 ===
Flight №	Date / time (UTC)	Rocket	Launch site	Payload	Payload mass	Orbit	Customer	Launch outcome
AV-052	January 21, 2015, 01:04	Atlas V 551	CCAFS SLC-41	MUOS-3	6,740 kg	GTO	DoD	Success
AV-052	Third Mobile User Objective System satellite; 200th Atlas-Centaur launch.							
AV-053	March 13, 2015, 02:44	Atlas V 421	CCAFS SLC-41	MMS	1,360 kg	HTO	NASA	Success
AV-053	NASA Magnetosphere research constellation.							
AV-054	May 20, 2015, 15:05	Atlas V 501	CCAFS SLC-41	USA-261 (AFSPC-5 (X-37B OTV-4, ULTRASat))	5,000 kg	LEO	US Air Force	Success
AV-054	Fourth flight of the X-37 military spaceplane; cubesats.							
AV-055	July 15, 2015, 15:36	Atlas V 401	CCAFS SLC-41	USA-262 (GPS IIF-10)	1,630 kg	MEO	US Air Force	Success
AV-055	Tenth GPS Block IIF navigation satellite.							
AV-056	September 2, 2015, 10:18	Atlas V 551	CCAFS SLC-41	MUOS-4	6,740 kg	GTO	DoD	Success
AV-056	Fourth Mobile User Objective System satellite.							
AV-059	October 2, 2015, 10:28	Atlas V 421	CCAFS SLC-41	MEXSAT-2 (Morelos 3)	3,200 kg	GTO	MEXSAT	Success
AV-059	Mexican communications satellite; 100th ULA launch.							
AV-058	October 8, 2015, 12:49	Atlas V 401	VAFB SLC-3E	USA-264 (NROL-55) + 13 cubesats	Classified	LEO	US NRO	Success
AV-058	Classified NRO payload; cubesats.							
AV-060	October 31, 2015, 16:13	Atlas V 401	CCAFS SLC-41	USA-265 (GPS IIF-11)	1,630 kg	MEO	US Air Force	Success
AV-060	Eleventh GPS Block IIF navigation satellite.							
AV-061	December 6, 2015, 21:44	Atlas V 401	CCAFS SLC-41	Cygnus CRS OA-4	7,492 kg	LEO to ISS	Orbital ATK	Success
AV-061	Fourth Cygnus ISS resupply vehicle; launched by ULA after the grounding of Antares following the Orb-3 failure.							
=== 2016 ===
Flight №	Date / time (UTC)	Rocket	Launch site	Payload	Payload mass	Orbit	Customer	Launch outcome
AV-057	February 5, 2016, 13:38	Atlas V 401	CCAFS SLC-41	USA-266 (GPS IIF-12)	1,630 kg	MEO	US Air Force	Success
AV-057	Twelfth GPS Block IIF navigation satellite.							
AV-064	March 23, 2016, 03:05	Atlas V 401	CCAFS SLC-41	Cygnus CRS OA-6	7,492 kg	LEO to ISS	Orbital ATK	Success
AV-064	Fifth Cygnus ISS resupply mission; early RD-180 engine shutdown resulting in longer second-stage burn.							
AV-063	June 24, 2016, 14:30	Atlas V 551	CCAFS SLC-41	MUOS-5	6,740 kg	GTO	DoD	Success
AV-063	Fifth Mobile User Objective System satellite.							
AV-065	July 28, 2016, 12:37	Atlas V 421	CCAFS SLC-41	USA 267 (NROL-61)	Classified	GTO	NRO	Success
AV-065	First fourth-generation SDS satellite; also known as QUASAR 20.							
AV-067	September 8, 2016, 23:05	Atlas V 411	CCAFS SLC-41	OSIRIS-REx	880 kg	Heliocentric	NASA	Success
AV-067	NASA sample-return mission to asteroid 101955 Bennu.							
AV-062	November 11, 2016, 18:30	Atlas V 401	VAFB SLC-3E	WorldView-4 (GeoEye-2) + 7 cubesats	2,485 kg	SSO	DigitalGlobe	Success
AV-062	DigitalGlobe earth observation satellite; NASA/LANL cubesats.							
AV-069	November 19, 2016, 23:42	Atlas V 541	CCAFS SLC-41	GOES-R (GOES-16)	2,857 kg	GTO	NOAA	Success
AV-069	Sixteenth GOES weather satellite; 100th EELV launch.							
AV-071	December 18, 2016, 19:13	Atlas V 431	CCAFS SLC-41	EchoStar 19 (Jupiter 2)	6,700 kg	GTO	EchoStar	Success
AV-071	Hughes internet satellite; highest capacity communications satellite ever launched.							
=== 2017 ===
Flight №	Date / time (UTC)	Rocket	Launch site	Payload	Payload mass	Orbit	Customer	Launch outcome
AV-066	January 21, 2017, 00:42	Atlas V 401	CCAFS SLC-41	USA-273 (SBIRS GEO-3)	~4,500 kg	GTO	USAF	Success
AV-066	Third Space-Based Infrared System early-warning missile detection satellite.							
AV-068	March 1, 2017, 17:49	Atlas V 401	VAFB SLC-3E	USA 274 (NROL-79)	Classified	LEO	US NRO	Success
AV-068	Two Naval Ocean Surveillance System satellites.							
AV-070	April 18, 2017, 15:11	Atlas V 401	CCAFS SLC-41	Cygnus CRS OA-7	7,225 kg	LEO	Orbital ATK	Success
AV-070	Sixth Cygnus ISS resupply mission, final one to utilize Atlas V.							
AV-074	August 18, 2017, 12:29	Atlas V 401	CCAFS SLC-41	TDRS-M	3,452 kg	GTO	NASA	Success
AV-074	Thirteenth NASA Tracking and Data Relay Satellite.							
AV-072	September 24, 2017, 05:49	Atlas V 541	VAFB SLC-3E	USA 278 (NROL-42)	Classified	HEO	US NRO	Success
AV-072	Trumpet 7 SIGINT satellite.							
AV-075	October 15, 2017, 07:28	Atlas V 421	CCAFS SLC-41	USA-279 (NROL-52)	Classified	GTO	US NRO	Success
AV-075	Second fourth-generation SDS satellite; also known as QUASAR 21.							
=== 2018 ===
Flight №	Date / time (UTC)	Rocket	Launch site	Payload	Payload mass	Orbit	Customer	Launch outcome
AV-076	January 20, 2018, 00:48	Atlas V 411	CCAFS SLC-41	USA-282 (SBIRS GEO-4)	~4,540 kg	GTO	USAF	Success
AV-076	Fourth Space-Based Infrared System Geostationary early-warning missile detection satellite.							
AV-077	March 1, 2018, 22:02	Atlas V 541	CCAFS SLC-41	GOES-S (GOES-17)	5,192 kg	GTO	NASA	Success
AV-077	Seventeenth GOES weather satellite.							
AV-079	April 14, 2018, 23:13	Atlas V 551	CCAFS SLC-41	AFSPC-11, multi-payload (CBAS & EAGLE)	Classified	GEO	USAF	Success
AV-079	USAF rideshare. Centaur disposal near GEO.							
AV-078	May 5, 2018, 11:05	Atlas V 401	VAFB SLC-3E	InSight	694 kg (InSight)	Heliocentric	NASA	Success
AV-078	NASA Mars seismology lander; two MarCO interplanetary communications cubesats.							
AV-073	October 17, 2018, 04:15	Atlas V 551	CCAFS SLC-41	USA-288 (AEHF-4)	6,168 kg	GTO	USAF	Success
AV-073	Fourth Advanced Extremely High Frequency military communications satellite.							
=== 2019 ===
Flight №	Date / time (UTC)	Rocket	Launch site	Payload	Payload mass	Orbit	Customer	Launch outcome
AV-083	August 8, 2019, 10:13	Atlas V 551	CCAFS SLC-41	USA-292 (AEHF-5)	6,168 kg	GTO	US Air Force	Success
AV-083	Fifth Advanced Extremely High Frequency military communications satellite.							
AV-080	December 20, 2019, 11:36	Atlas V N22	CCAFS SLC-41	Boeing Starliner OFT	~13,000 kg	LEO (ISS)	Boeing	Success
AV-080	First Atlas V launch with dual-engine Centaur; Boeing Starliner test flight; Atlas V performed nominally but Starliner failed to complete its mission.							

== See also ==
- List of Thor and Delta launches (2010-2019)
