= USA-203 =

American navigation satellite used for GPS

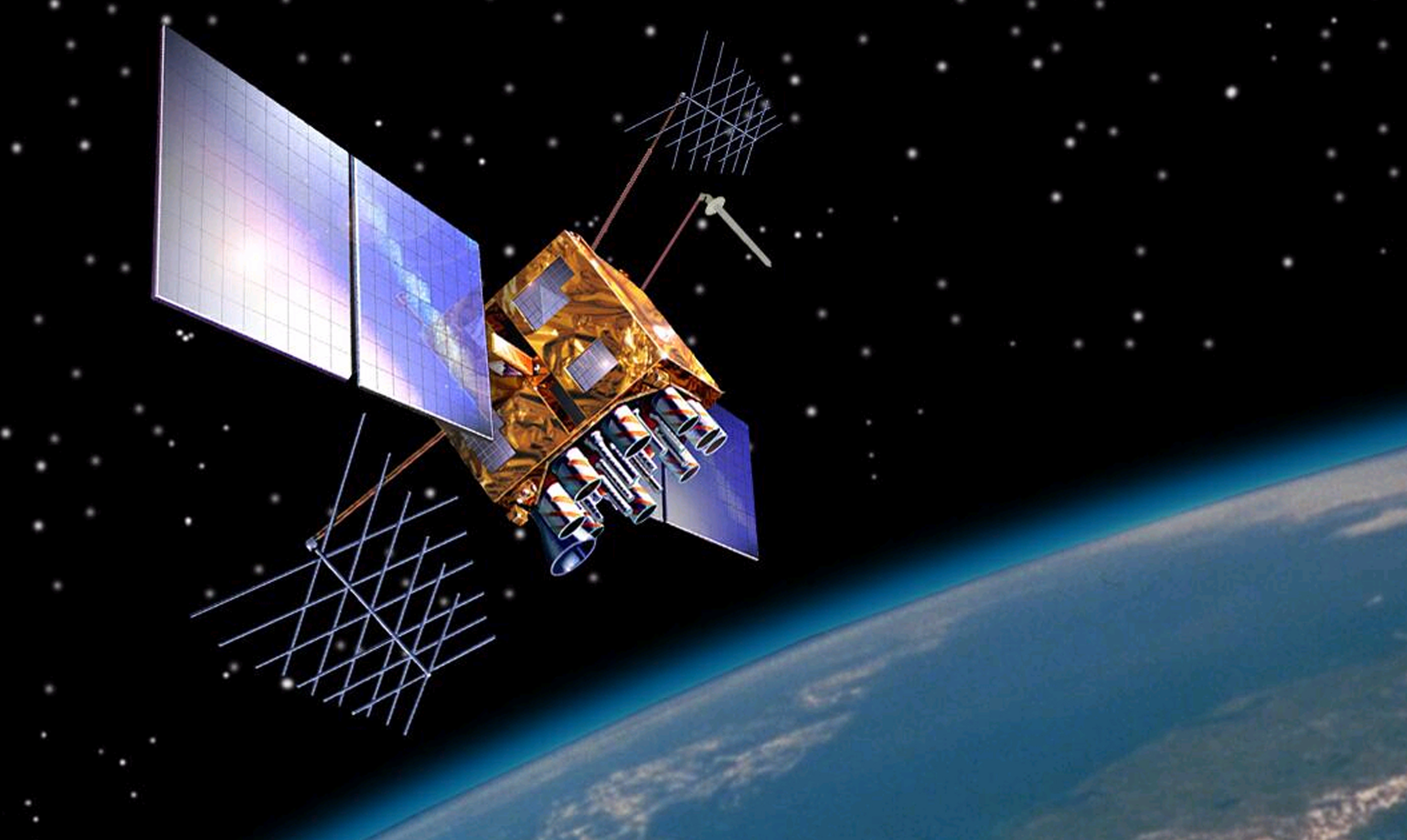
- A Block IIRM GPS satellite
- Mission type: Navigation
- Operator: US Air Force
- COSPAR ID: 2009-014A
- SATCAT no.: 34661
- Mission duration: 10 years (planned); Never entered service

Spacecraft properties
- Spacecraft type: GPS Block IIRM
- Bus: AS-4000
- Manufacturer: Lockheed Martin
- Launch mass: 2,032 kilograms (4,480 lb)

Start of mission
- Launch date: 24 March 2009, 08:34 UTC
- Rocket: Delta II 7925-9.5, D340
- Launch site: Cape Canaveral SLC-17A

End of mission
- Deactivated: 6 May 2011

Orbital parameters
- Reference system: Geocentric
- Regime: Medium Earth (Semi-synchronous)
- Perigee altitude: 20,045 kilometers (12,455 mi)
- Apogee altitude: 20,335 kilometers (12,636 mi)
- Inclination: 55.8 degrees
- Period: 718 minutes

USA-203, also known as GPS IIR-20(M), GPS IIRM-7 and GPS SVN-49, is an American navigation satellite which was intended to become part of the Global Positioning System. It was the sixth of seven Block IIRM satellites to be launched, and the twentieth of twenty one Block IIR satellites overall. It was built by Lockheed Martin, using the AS-4000 satellite bus, and had a mass of 2,032 kilograms (4,480 lb).

USA-203 was launched at 08:34 UTC on 24 March 2009, atop a Delta II carrier rocket, flight number D340, flying in the 7925-9.5 configuration. The launch took place from Space Launch Complex 17A at the Cape Canaveral Air Force Station, and placed USA-203 into a transfer orbit. The satellite raised itself into medium Earth orbit using a Star-37FM apogee motor.

USA-203 is located in an orbit with a perigee of 20,045 kilometers (12,455 mi), an apogee of 20,335 kilometers (12,636 mi), a period of 718 minutes, and 55.8 degrees of inclination to the equator. It was intended to operate in slot 2 of plane B of the GPS constellation, replacing USA-128, and to broadcast signal PRN-01. During in-orbit testing an anomaly was discovered with the signals it was broadcasting, which prevented its operational use. It was decommissioned on 6 May 2011, two years into its ten-year design life.

In addition to its operational navigation signals, USA-203 was also equipped to broadcast a demonstration of the L5 signal which would be introduced with the GPS Block IIF series. The satellite was able to broadcast this signal correctly, but it was discovered that a filter used to produce the L5 signal was causing the disruption to its other frequencies.

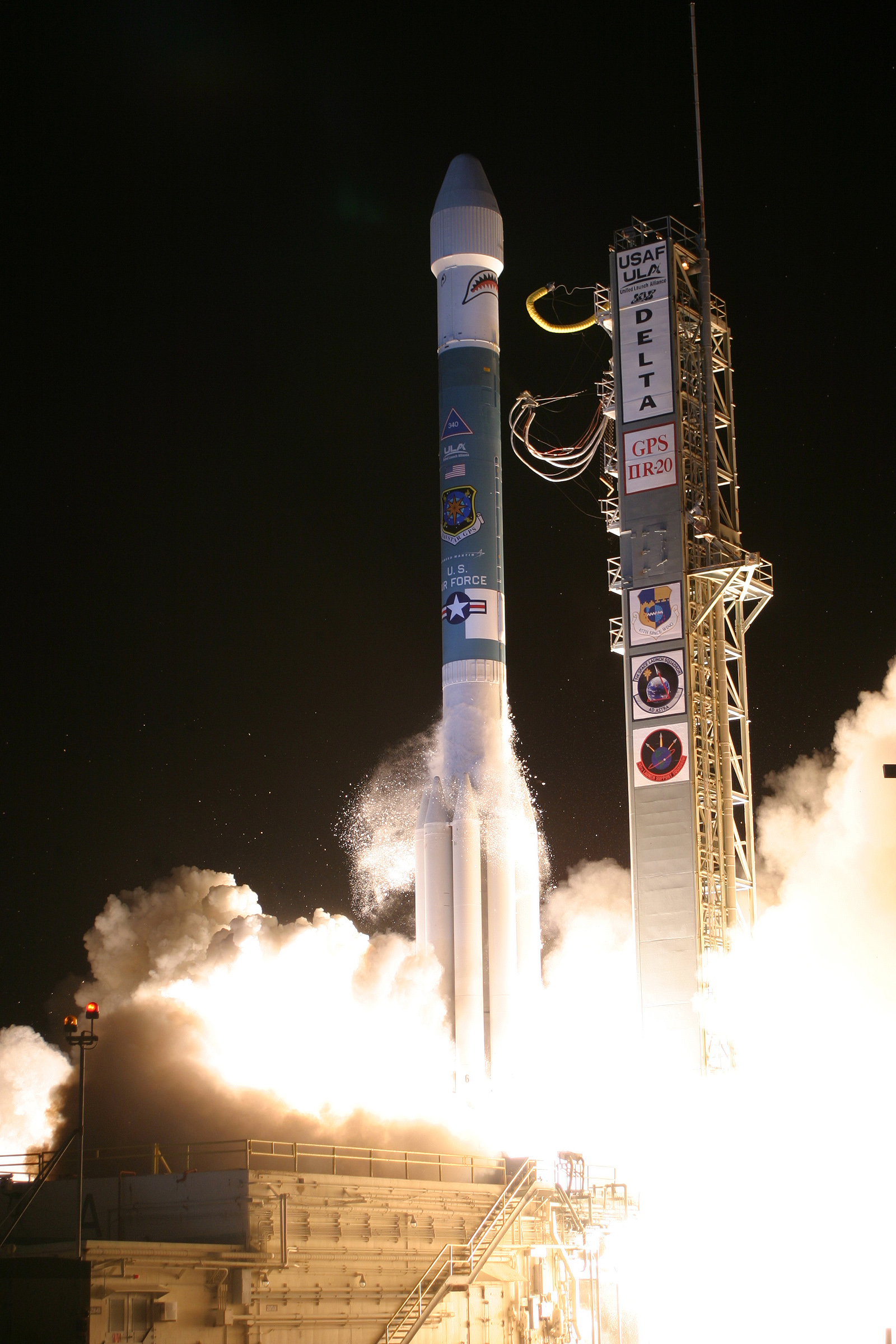
Launch of USA-203
