= USA-265 =

American navigation satellite used for GPS

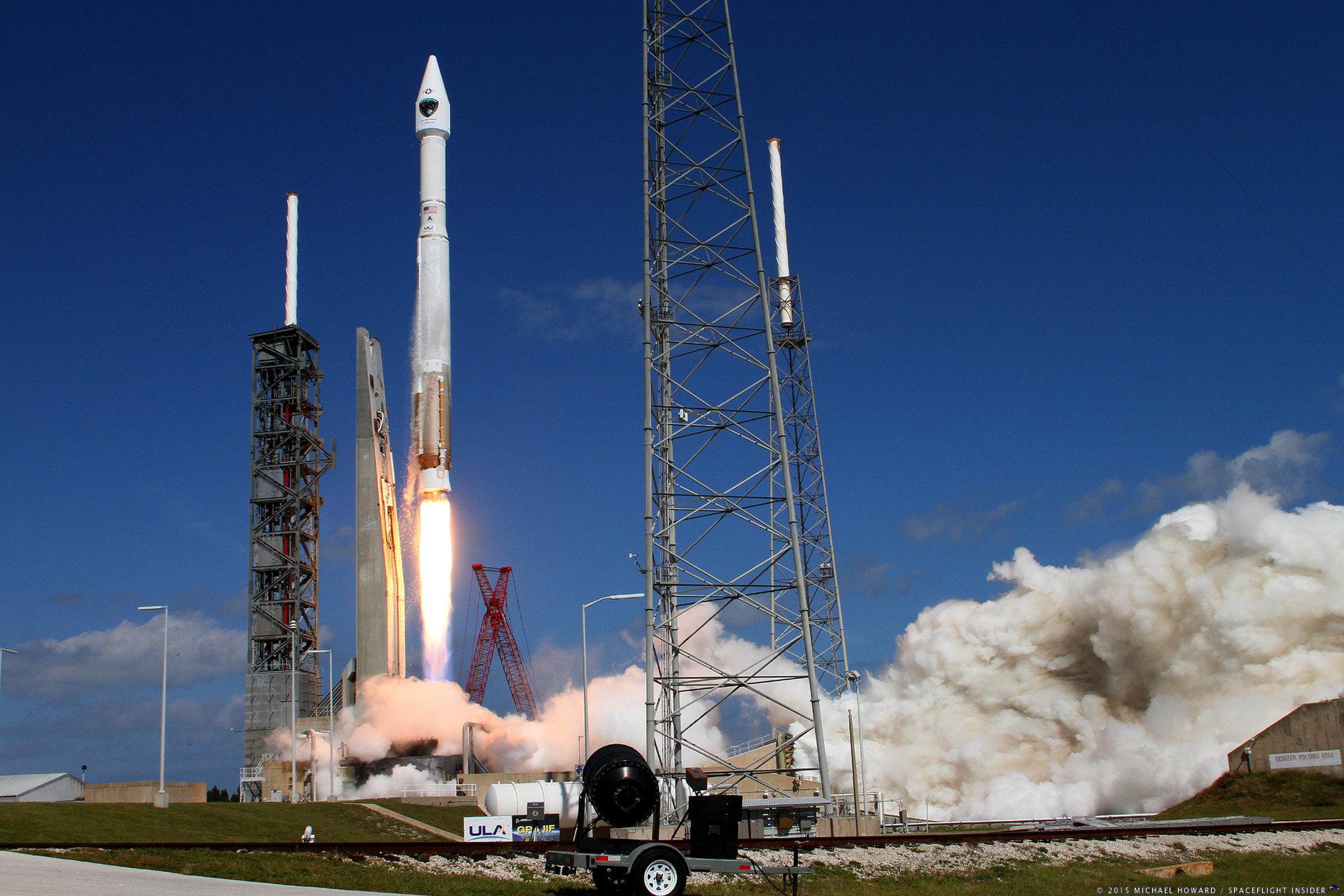
- Launch of GPS-IIF 11
- Mission type: Navigation
- Operator: US Air Force
- COSPAR ID: 2015-062A
- SATCAT no.: 41019
- Mission duration: 12 years (planned)

Spacecraft properties
- Spacecraft: GPS SVN-73 (IIF-11)
- Spacecraft type: GPS Block IIF
- Manufacturer: Boeing
- Launch mass: 1,630 kilograms (3,590 lb)

Start of mission
- Launch date: 31 October 2015, 16:13 UTC
- Rocket: Atlas V 401, (AV-060)
- Launch site: Cape Canaveral SLC-41
- Contractor: ULA

Orbital parameters
- Reference system: Geocentric
- Regime: Medium Earth (Semi-synchronous)
- Perigee altitude: 20,444 km (12,703 mi)
- Apogee altitude: 20,491 km (12,733 mi)
- Inclination: 54.99 degrees
- Period: 729.58 minutes
- Epoch: 5 December 2015, 17:24:23 UTC

USA-265, also known as GPS IIF-11, GPS SVN-73 and NAVSTAR 75, is an American navigation satellite which forms part of the Global Positioning System. It was the eleventh of twelve Block IIF satellites to be launched.

== Launch ==
Built by Boeing and launched by United Launch Alliance, USA-265 was launched at 16:13 UTC on 31 October 2015, atop an Atlas V 401 carrier rocket, vehicle number AV-060. The launch took place from Space Launch Complex 41 at the Cape Canaveral Air Force Station, and placed USA-265 directly into semi-synchronous orbit.

== Orbit ==
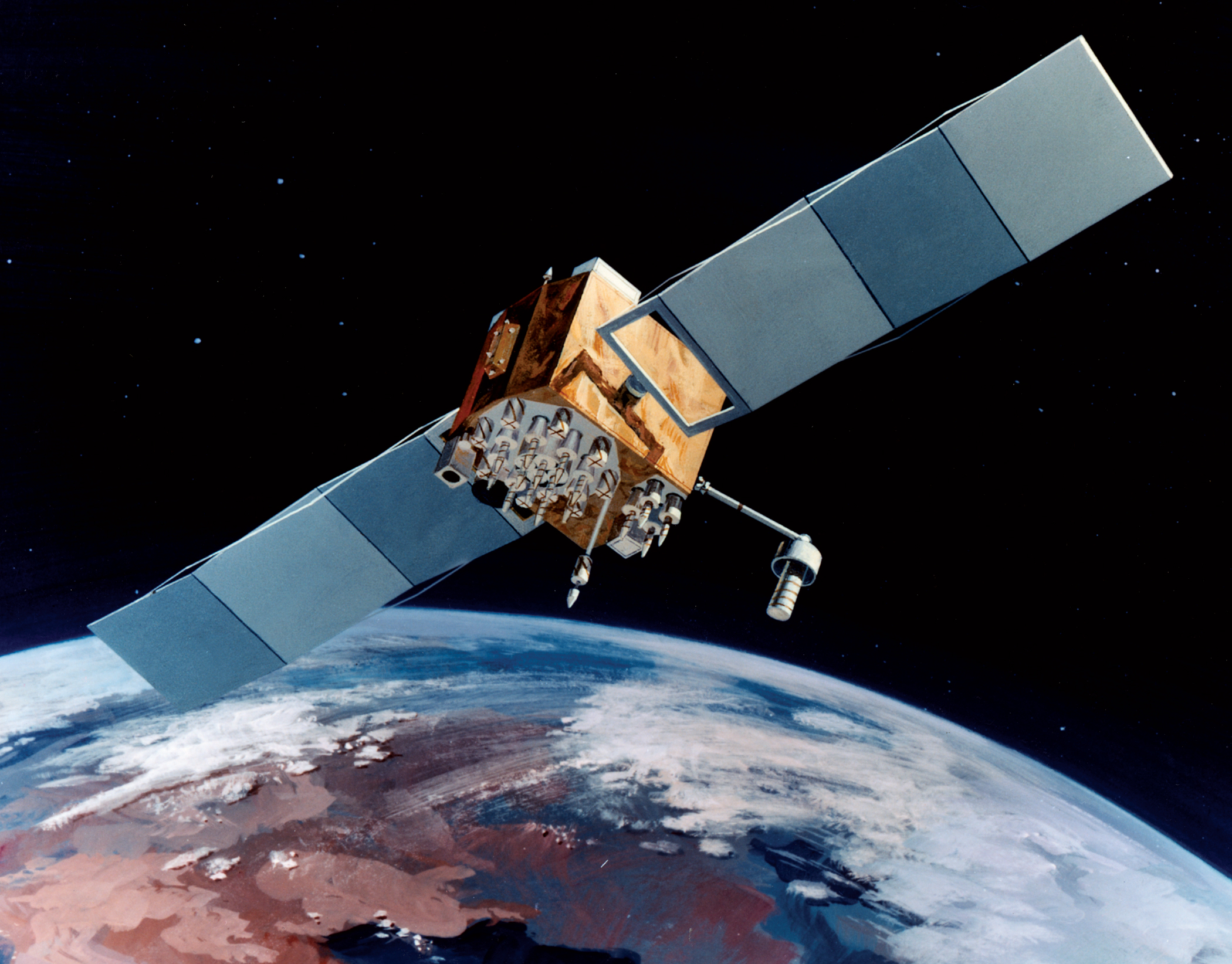
A Block IIF GPS satellite

As of 5 December 2015, USA-265 was in an orbit with a perigee of 20,444 kilometers (12,703 mi), an apogee of 20,491 kilometers (12,733 mi), a period of 729.58 minutes, and 54.99 degrees of inclination to the equator. It is used to broadcast the PRN 10 signal, and operates in slot 6 of plane E of the GPS constellation. The satellite has a design life of 15 years and a mass of 1,630 kilograms (3,590 lb). It is currently in service following commissioning on December 9, 2015.
