= USA-256 =

American navigation satellite used for GPS

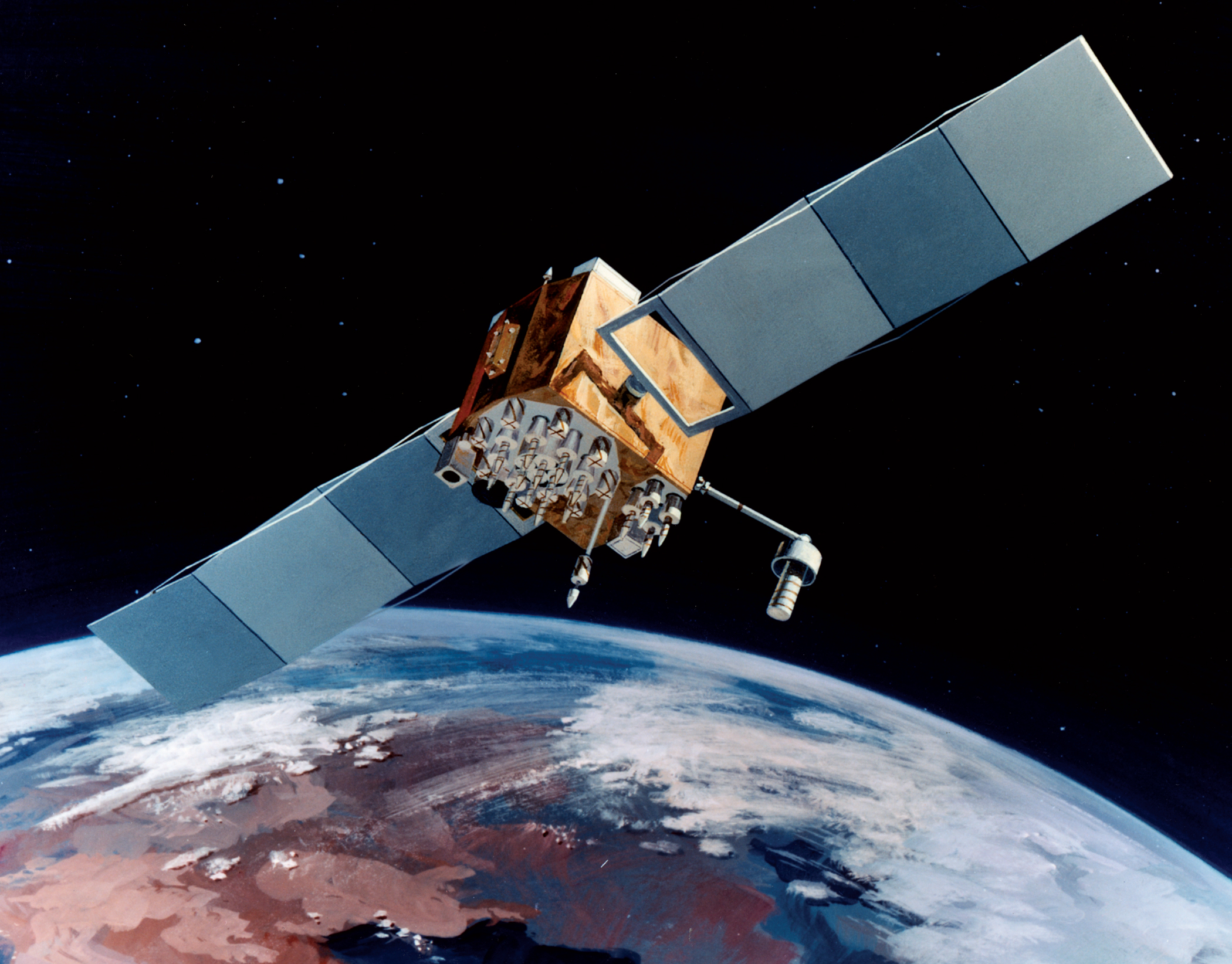
- A Block IIF GPS satellite
- Mission type: Navigation
- Operator: US Air Force
- COSPAR ID: 2014-045A
- SATCAT no.: 40105
- Mission duration: 12 years (planned)

Spacecraft properties
- Spacecraft: GPS SVN-68 (IIF-7)
- Spacecraft type: GPS Block IIF
- Manufacturer: Boeing
- Launch mass: 1,630 kilograms (3,590 lb)

Start of mission
- Launch date: 2 August 2014, 03:23 UTC
- Rocket: Atlas V 401, AV-048
- Launch site: Cape Canaveral SLC-41
- Contractor: ULA

Orbital parameters
- Reference system: Geocentric
- Regime: Medium Earth (Semi-synchronous)
- Perigee altitude: 20,341 km (12,639 mi)
- Apogee altitude: 20,469 km (12,719 mi)
- Inclination: 55.02 degrees
- Period: 727.05 minutes
- Epoch: 2 August 2014

USA-256, also known as GPS IIF-7, GPS SVN-68 and NAVSTAR 71, is an American navigation satellite which forms part of the Global Positioning System. It was the seventh of twelve Block IIF satellites to be launched.

== Launch ==
Built by Boeing and launched by United Launch Alliance, USA-256 was launched at 03:23 UTC on 2 August 2014, atop an Atlas V 401 carrier rocket, vehicle number AV-048. The launch took place from Space Launch Complex 41 at the Cape Canaveral Air Force Station, and placed USA-256 directly into medium Earth orbit.

== Orbit ==
As of 3 August 2014, USA-256 was in an orbit with a perigee of 20,341 kilometers (12,639 mi), an apogee of 20,469 kilometers (12,719 mi), a period of 727.05 minutes, and 55.02 degrees of inclination to the equator. It is used to broadcast the PRN 09 signal, and operates in slot 6 of plane F of the GPS constellation. The satellite has a design life of 12 years and a mass of 1,630 kilograms (3,590 lb). It is currently in service following commissioning on September 17, 2014.
