= USA-266 =

American navigation satellite used for GPS

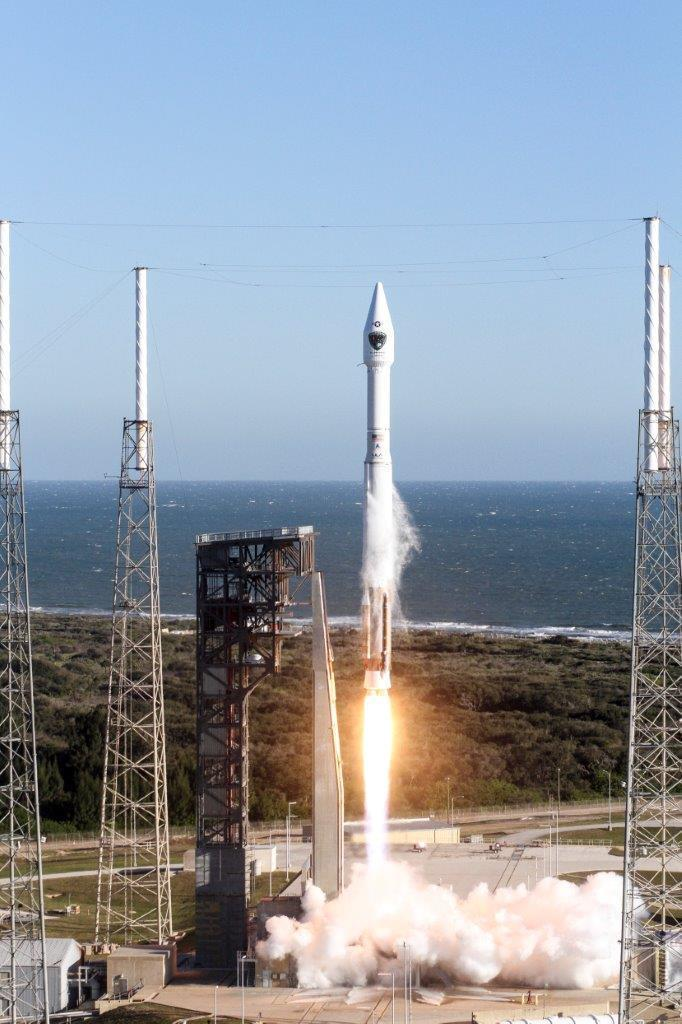
- Launch of GPS-IIF 12
- Names: GPS IIF-12; GPS SVN-70; NAVSTAR 76
- Mission type: Navigation
- Operator: US Air Force
- COSPAR ID: 2016-007A
- SATCAT no.: 41328
- Mission duration: 12 years (planned)

Spacecraft properties
- Spacecraft: GPS SVN-70 (IIF-12)
- Spacecraft type: GPS Block IIF
- Manufacturer: Boeing
- Launch mass: 1,630 kg (3,590 lb)

Start of mission
- Launch date: 5 February 2016, 13:38 UTC
- Rocket: Atlas V 401 (AV-057)
- Launch site: CCAFS, SLC-41
- Contractor: ULA
- Entered service: 9 March 2016

Orbital parameters
- Reference system: Geocentric orbit
- Regime: Medium Earth orbit (Semi-synchronous)
- Perigee altitude: 20,196 km (12,549 mi)
- Apogee altitude: 20,181 km (12,540 mi)
- Inclination: 55.01°
- Period: 717.9 minutes

USA-266, also known as GPS IIF-12, GPS SVN-70 and NAVSTAR 76, is an American navigation satellite which forms part of the Global Positioning System. It was the twelfth of twelve Block IIF satellites to be launched.

== Launch ==
Built by Boeing and launched by United Launch Alliance (ULA), USA-266 was launched at 13:38 UTC on 5 February 2016, atop an Atlas V 401 launch vehicle, vehicle number AV-057. The launch took place from Space Launch Complex 41 at the Cape Canaveral Air Force Station, and placed USA-266 directly into semi-synchronous orbit.

== Orbit ==
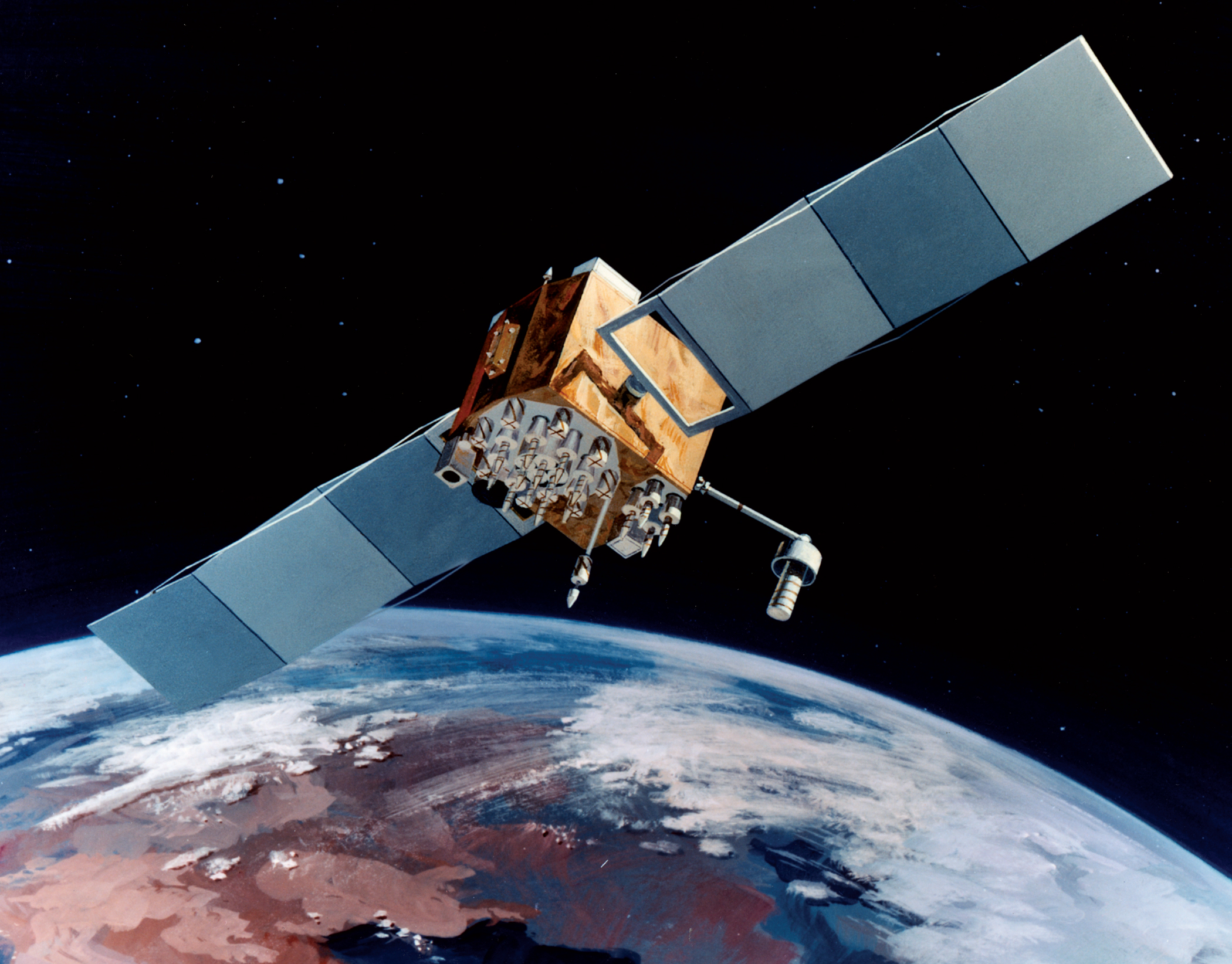
A Block IIF GPS satellite

As of March 2016, USA-266 was in an orbit with a perigee of 20,181 km (12,540 mi), an apogee of 20,196 km (12,549 mi), a period of 717.9 minutes, and 55.01° of inclination to the equator. It is used to broadcast the PRN 32 signal, and operates in slot 5 of plane F of the GPS constellation. The satellite has a design life of 12 years and a mass of 1,630 kg (3,590 lb). It is currently in service following commissioning on 9 March 2016.
