= USA-242 =

American navigation satellite used for GPS

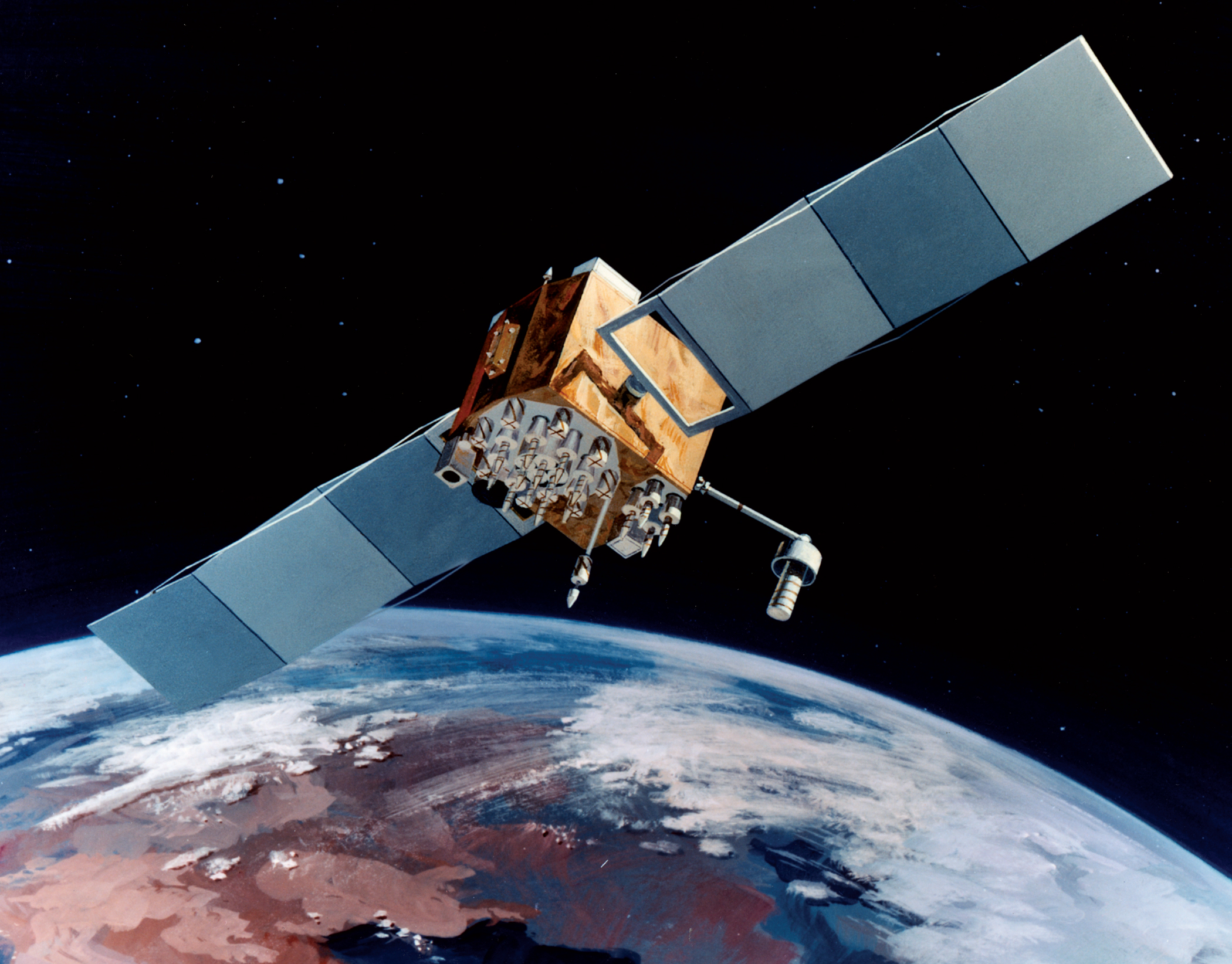
- Artist's impression of a GPS IIF satellite
- Mission type: Navigation
- Operator: US Air Force
- COSPAR ID: 2013-023A
- SATCAT no.: 39166
- Mission duration: 12 years (planned)

Spacecraft properties
- Spacecraft: GPS SVN-66 (IIF-4)
- Spacecraft type: GPS Block IIF
- Manufacturer: Boeing
- Launch mass: 1,630 kilograms (3,590 lb)

Start of mission
- Launch date: 15 May 2013, 21:38 UTC
- Rocket: Atlas V 401, AV-039
- Launch site: Cape Canaveral SLC-41
- Contractor: ULA

Orbital parameters
- Reference system: Geocentric
- Regime: Medium Earth (Semi-synchronous)
- Perigee altitude: 20,459 kilometers (12,713 mi)
- Apogee altitude: 20,459 kilometers (12,713 mi)
- Inclination: 55 degrees
- Period: 12 hours
- Epoch: Target

USA-242, also known as GPS IIF-4, GPS IIF SV-5, Navstar-68 and Vega, is an American navigation satellite which was launched on 15 May 2013 and became operational on 21 June 2013. The fourth Block IIF GPS satellite, it forms part of the Global Positioning System.

USA-242 is a 1,630-kilogram (3,590 lb) spacecraft, built by Boeing with a design life of 15 years. It operates from a semi-synchronous medium Earth orbit, at an altitude of 20,459 kilometers (12,713 mi) an inclination of 55 degrees, in slot 5 of plane C of the GPS constellation. The new satellite was originally intended to replace the seventeen-year-old USA-117 satellite, but currently both USA-117 (SVN-33) and USA-242 (SVN-66) are in active use. USA-242 broadcasts its navigation signals using the PRN-27 signal modulation.

United Launch Alliance conducted the launch of GPS IIF-4, using an Atlas V 401 carrier rocket. Launch took place from Space Launch Complex 41 at the Cape Canaveral Air Force Station, with liftoff occurring at 21:38 UTC on 15 May 2013, the beginning of an 18-minute launch window. The launch marked the first time since 1985 that a GPS satellite had launched on an Atlas rocket, or indeed any rocket other than a Delta.
