= USA-258 =

American navigation satellite used for GPS

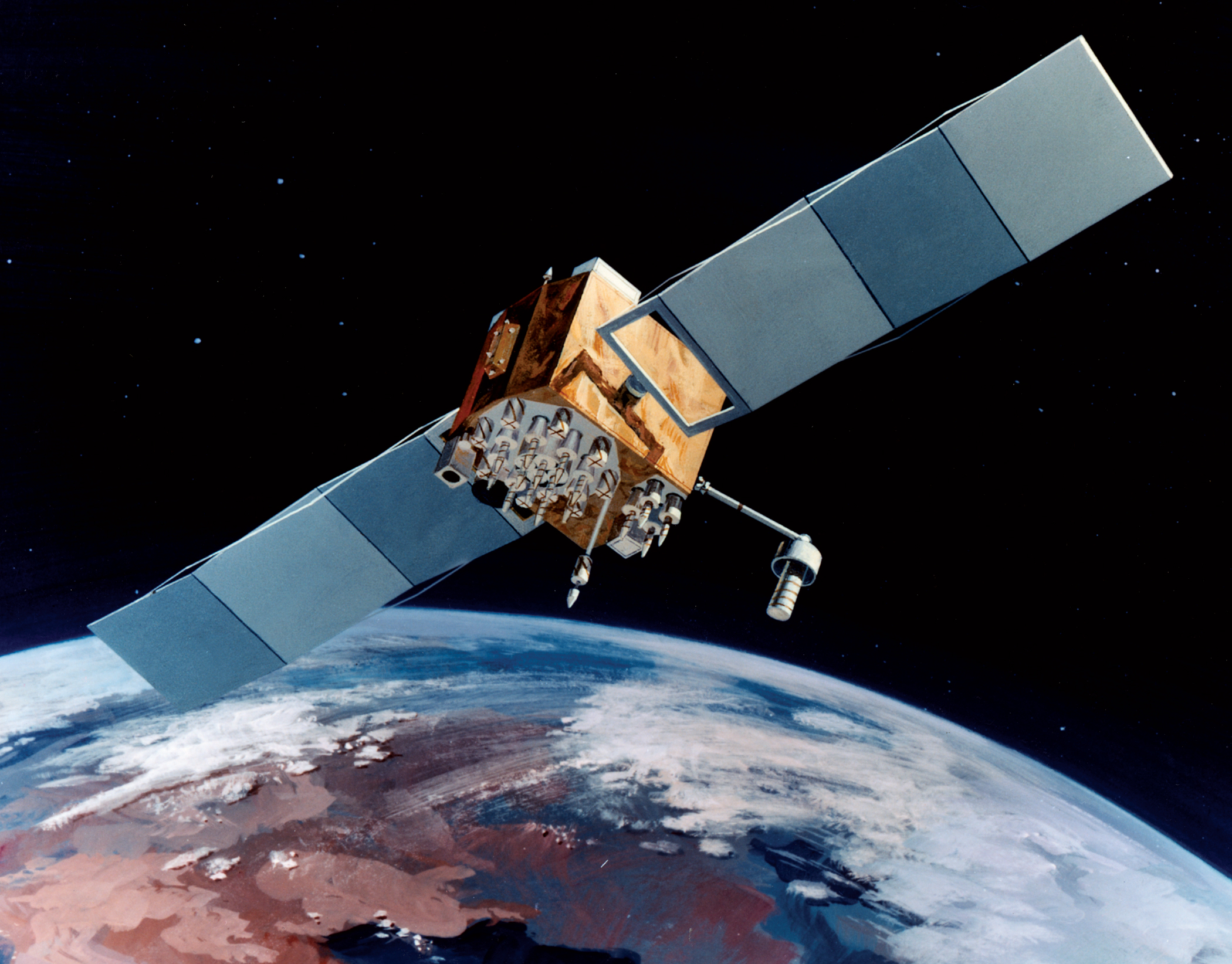
- A Block IIF GPS satellite
- Mission type: Navigation
- Operator: US Air Force
- COSPAR ID: 2014-068A
- SATCAT no.: 40294
- Mission duration: 12 years (planned)

Spacecraft properties
- Spacecraft: GPS SVN-69 (IIF-8)
- Spacecraft type: GPS Block IIF
- Manufacturer: Boeing
- Launch mass: 1,630 kilograms (3,590 lb)

Start of mission
- Launch date: 29 October 2014, 17:21 UTC
- Rocket: Atlas V 401, AV-050
- Launch site: Cape Canaveral SLC-41
- Contractor: ULA

Orbital parameters
- Reference system: Geocentric
- Regime: Medium Earth (Semi-synchronous)
- Perigee altitude: 20,455 km (12,710 mi)
- Apogee altitude: 20,480 km (12,730 mi)
- Inclination: 55.00 degrees
- Period: 729.56 minutes
- Epoch: 29 October 2014

USA-258, also known as GPS IIF-8, GPS SVN-69 and NAVSTAR 72, is an American navigation satellite which forms part of the Global Positioning System. It was the eighth of twelve Block IIF satellites to be launched.

== Launch ==
Built by Boeing and launched by United Launch Alliance, USA-258 was launched at 17:21 UTC on 29 October 2014, atop an Atlas V 401 carrier rocket, vehicle number AV-050. The launch took place from Space Launch Complex 41 at the Cape Canaveral Air Force Station, and placed USA-258 directly into medium Earth orbit.

== Orbit ==
As of 29 October 2014, USA-258 was in an orbit with a perigee of 20,455 kilometers (12,710 mi), an apogee of 20,480 kilometers (12,730 mi), a period of 729.56 minutes, and 55.00 degrees of inclination to the equator. It is used to broadcast the PRN 03 signal, and operates in slot 1 of plane E of the GPS constellation. The satellite has a design life of 15 years and a mass of 1,630 kilograms (3,590 lb). It is currently in service following commissioning on December 12, 2014.
