= USA-262 =

American navigation satellite used for GPS

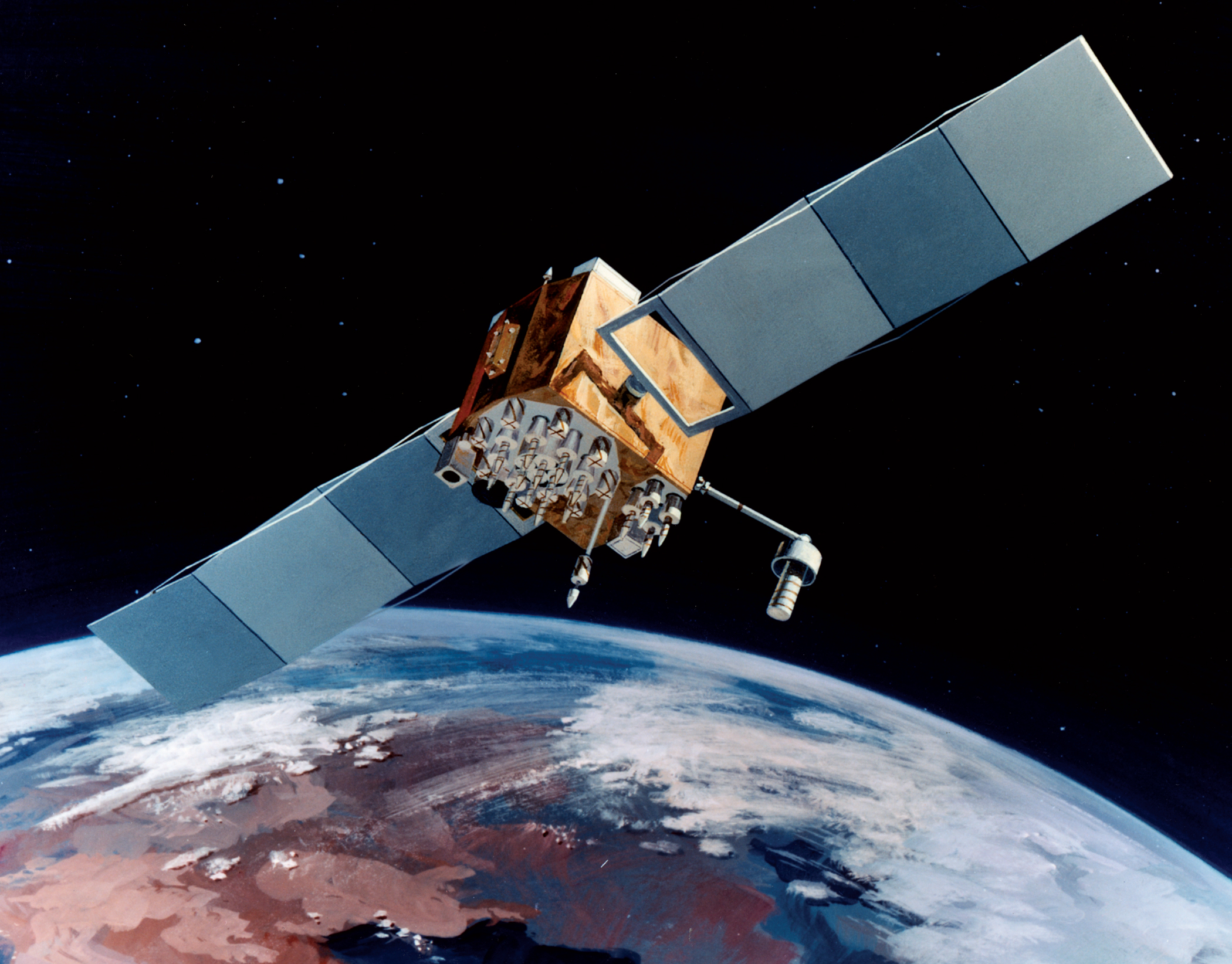
- A Block IIF GPS satellite
- Mission type: Navigation
- Operator: US Air Force
- COSPAR ID: 2015-033A
- SATCAT no.: 40730
- Mission duration: 12 years (planned)

Spacecraft properties
- Spacecraft: GPS SVN-72 (IIF-10)
- Spacecraft type: GPS Block IIF
- Manufacturer: Boeing
- Launch mass: 1,630 kilograms (3,590 lb)

Start of mission
- Launch date: 15 July 2015, 15:36 UTC
- Rocket: Atlas V 401, AV-055
- Launch site: Cape Canaveral SLC-41
- Contractor: ULA

Orbital parameters
- Reference system: Geocentric
- Regime: Medium Earth (Semi-synchronous)
- Perigee altitude: 20,445 km (12,704 mi)
- Apogee altitude: 20,450 km (12,710 mi)
- Inclination: 55.00 degrees
- Period: 728.77 minutes
- Epoch: 15 July 2015, 21:23:20 UTC

USA-262, also known as GPS IIF-10, GPS SVN-72 and NAVSTAR 74, is an American navigation satellite which forms part of the Global Positioning System. It was the tenth of twelve Block IIF satellites to be launched.

== Launch ==
Built by Boeing and launched by United Launch Alliance, USA-262 was launched at 15:36 UTC on 15 July 2015, atop an Atlas V 401 carrier rocket, vehicle number AV-055. The launch took place from Space Launch Complex 41 at the Cape Canaveral Air Force Station, and placed USA-262 directly into semi-synchronous orbit.

== Orbit ==
As of 15 July 2015, USA-262 was in an orbit with a perigee of 20,445 kilometers (12,704 mi), an apogee of 20,450 kilometers (12,710 mi), a period of 728.77 minutes, and 55.00 degrees of inclination to the equator. It is used to broadcast the PRN 08 signal, and operates in slot 3 of plane C of the GPS constellation. The satellite has a design life of 15 years and a mass of 1,630 kilograms (3,590 lb). It is currently in service following commissioning on August 12, 2015.
