= USA-227 =

American communications satellite

- Names: NROL-27; NRO Launch 27
- Mission type: Communication
- Operator: NRO
- COSPAR ID: 2011-011A
- SATCAT no.: 37377

Spacecraft properties
- Spacecraft type: SDS-3

Start of mission
- Launch date: 11 March 2011, 23:38:00 UTC
- Rocket: Delta IV-M+(4,2) (Delta D353)
- Launch site: Cape Canaveral, SLC-37B
- Contractor: United Launch Alliance

Orbital parameters
- Reference system: Geocentric orbit
- Regime: Geosynchronous orbit
- Longitude: 30.4° West

USA-227, known before launch as NRO Launch 27 (NROL-27), is an American communications satellite which was launched in 2011. It is operated by the United States National Reconnaissance Office.

== Launch ==
United Launch Alliance (ULA) performed the launch of USA-227, using a Delta IV-M+(4,2) launch vehicle flying from Space Launch Complex 37B at the Cape Canaveral Air Force Station (CCAFS). The launch occurred at 23:38:00 UTC on 11 March 2011. Following liftoff the rocket flew east, placing the satellite into a geosynchronous transfer orbit. By 23:43 UTC, official updates on the status of the launch had been discontinued.

== Mission ==
Whilst details of its mission are officially classified, amateur observers have identified USA-227 as being a third-generation Satellite Data System satellite in geosynchronous orbit. The first amateur observation of the satellite was made on 6 April 2011, when the spacecraft was located at a longitude of 30.4° west. SDS satellites are used to relay data from American reconnaissance satellites to ground stations.
