= USA-260 =

American navigation satellite used for GPS

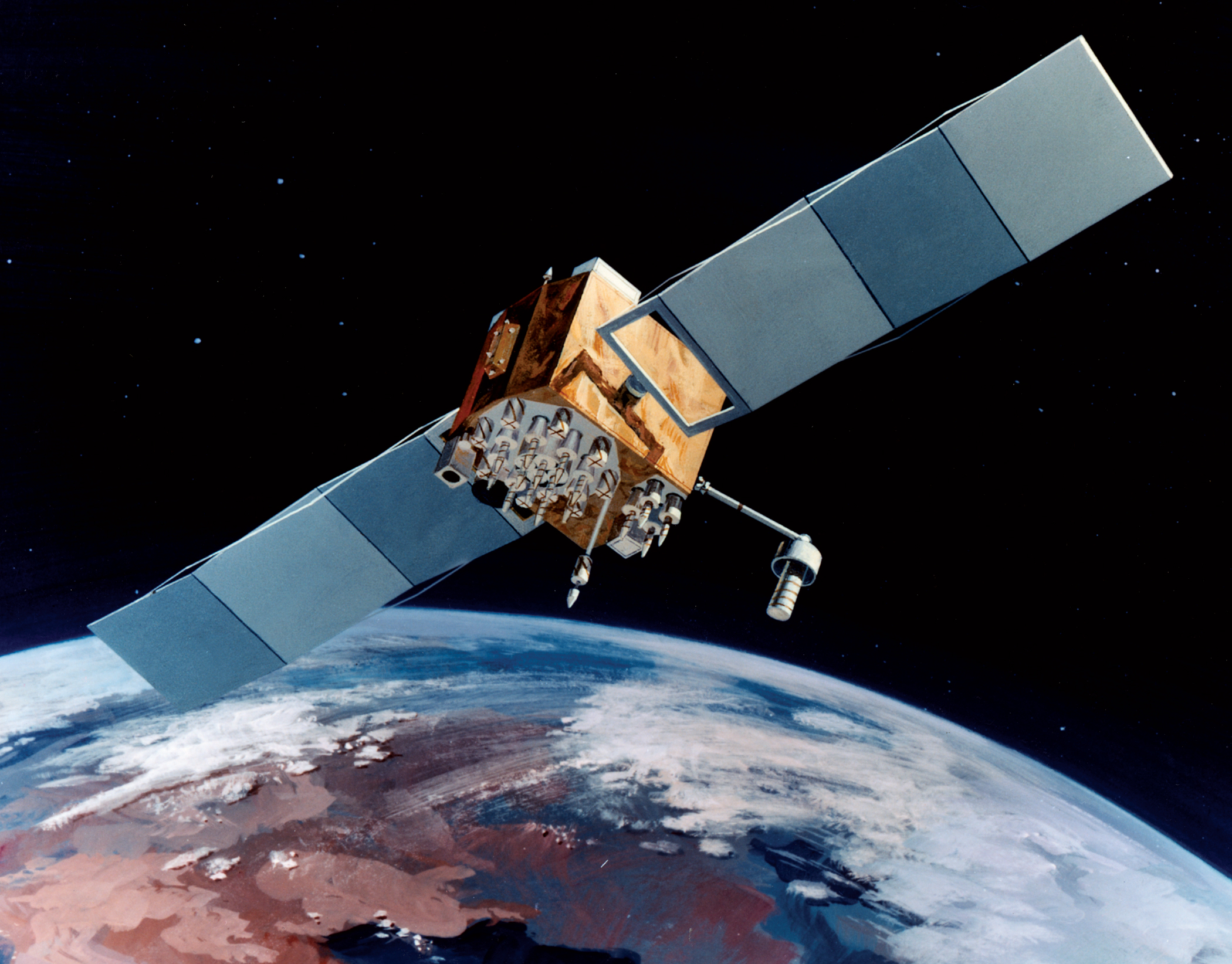
- A Block IIF GPS satellite
- Mission type: Navigation
- Operator: US Air Force
- COSPAR ID: 2015-013A
- SATCAT no.: 40534
- Mission duration: 12 years (planned)

Spacecraft properties
- Spacecraft: GPS SVN-71 (IIF-9)
- Spacecraft type: GPS Block IIF
- Manufacturer: Boeing
- Launch mass: 1,630 kilograms (3,590 lb)

Start of mission
- Launch date: 25 March 2015, 18:36 UTC
- Rocket: Delta IV-M+(4,2), D371
- Launch site: Cape Canaveral SLC-37B
- Contractor: ULA

Orbital parameters
- Reference system: Geocentric
- Regime: Medium Earth (Semi-synchronous)
- Perigee altitude: 20,445 km (12,704 mi)
- Apogee altitude: 20,468 km (12,718 mi)
- Inclination: 55.00 degrees
- Period: 729.14 minutes
- Epoch: 25 March 2015, 23:57:44 UTC

USA-260, also known as GPS IIF-9, GPS SVN-71 and NAVSTAR 73, is an American Satellite navigation which forms part of the Global Positioning System. It was the ninth of twelve Block IIF satellites to be launched.

== Launch ==
Built by Boeing and launched by United Launch Alliance, USA-260 was launched at 18:36 UTC on 25 March 2015, atop a Delta IV carrier rocket, flight number D370, flying in the Medium+(4,2) configuration. The launch took place from Space Launch Complex 37B at the Cape Canaveral Air Force Station, and placed USA-260 directly into medium Earth orbit.

== Orbit ==
On 25 March 2015, USA-260 was in an orbit with a perigee of 20,445 kilometers (12,704 mi), an apogee of 20,468 kilometers (12,718 mi), a period of 729.14 minutes, and 55.00 degrees of inclination to the equator. It is used to broadcast the PRN 26 signal, and operates in slot 5 of plane B of the GPS constellation. The satellite has a design life of 15 years and a mass of 1,630 kilograms (3,590 lb). It is currently in service following commissioning on April 20, 2015.
