= USA-248 =

American navigation satellite used for GPS

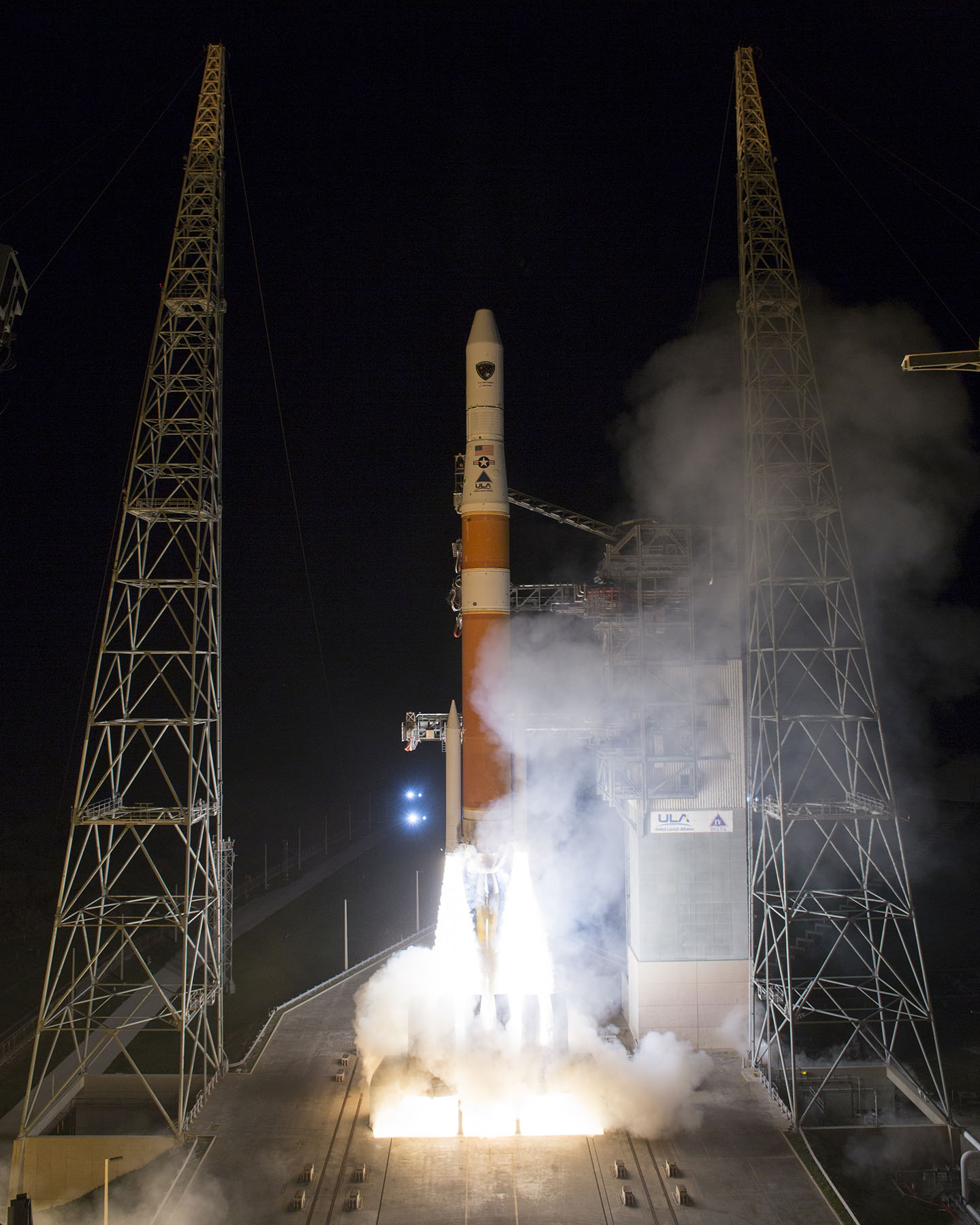
- Launch of GPS-IIF 05
- Mission type: Navigation
- Operator: US Air Force
- COSPAR ID: 2014-008A
- SATCAT no.: 39533
- Mission duration: 12 years (planned)

Spacecraft properties
- Spacecraft: GPS SVN-64 (IIF-5)
- Spacecraft type: GPS Block IIF
- Manufacturer: Boeing
- Launch mass: 1,630 kilograms (3,590 lb)

Start of mission
- Launch date: 21 February 2014, 01:59 UTC
- Rocket: Delta IV-M+(4,2), (D-365)
- Launch site: Cape Canaveral SLC-37B
- Contractor: ULA

Orbital parameters
- Reference system: Geocentric
- Regime: Medium Earth (Semi-synchronous)
- Perigee altitude: 20,175 km (12,536 mi)
- Apogee altitude: 20,191 km (12,546 mi)
- Inclination: 54.96 degrees
- Period: 717.99 minutes
- Epoch: 22 April 2014

USA-248, also known as GPS IIF-5, GPS SVN-64 and NAVSTAR 69, is an American navigation satellite which forms part of the Global Positioning System. It was the fifth of twelve Block IIF satellites to be launched.

== Launch ==
Built by Boeing and launched by United Launch Alliance, USA-248 was launched at 01:59 UTC on 21 February 2014, atop a Delta IV carrier rocket, flight number D365, flying in the Medium+(4,2) configuration. The launch took place from Space Launch Complex 37B at the Cape Canaveral Air Force Station, and placed USA-248 directly into medium Earth orbit.

== Orbit ==
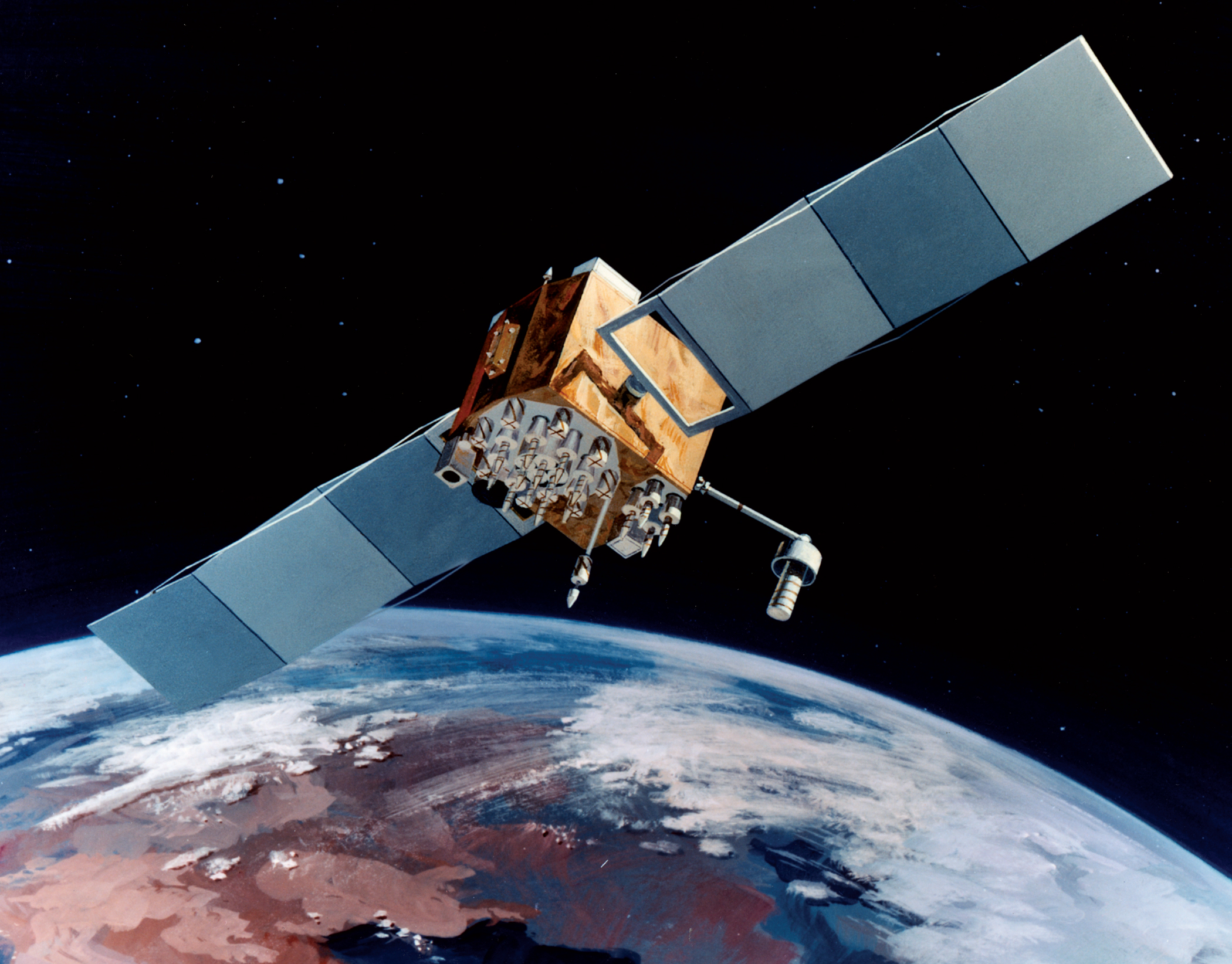
A Block IIF GPS satellite

As of 22 April 2014, USA-248 was in an orbit with a perigee of 20,175 kilometers (12,536 mi), an apogee of 20,191 kilometers (12,546 mi), a period of 717.99 minutes, and 54.96 degrees of inclination to the equator. It is used to broadcast the PRN 30 signal, and operates in slot 6 of plane A of the GPS constellation. The satellite has a design life of 15 years and a mass of 1,630 kilograms (3,590 lb). It is currently in service following commissioning on May 30, 2014.
