= Autonomous Nanosatellite Guardian for Evaluating Local Space =

ANGELS
- Mission type: Technology demonstrator
- Operator: AFRL
- COSPAR ID: 2014-043C
- SATCAT no.: 40101

The Autonomous Nanosatellite Guardian for Evaluating Local Space (ANGELS) project is an Air Force Research Laboratory project to develop a small satellite which can orbit close to a larger spacecraft and monitor the local space environment.

ANGELS was designed to evaluate SSA techniques in a limited region around its Delta-4 launch vehicle upper stage several hundred kilometers above GEO, testing maneuvering concepts around the rocket body. The vehicle began experiments approximately 50 km away from the upper stage and cautiously progressed over several months to tests within several kilometers. As part of the research effort, ANGELS explored increased levels of automation in mission planning and execution to enable more timely, safe, and complex operations with a reduced operations footprint.

ANGELS was launched by a Delta-4M+(4,2) rocket in 2014 as a secondary payload on the AFSPC-4 (GSSAP 1, 2) mission. It was delivered directly into GEO, and had a planned operating duration of one year. The satellite met various space situational awareness mission objectives and was eventually decommissioned in November 2017.
