= USA-239 =

American navigation satellite used for GPS

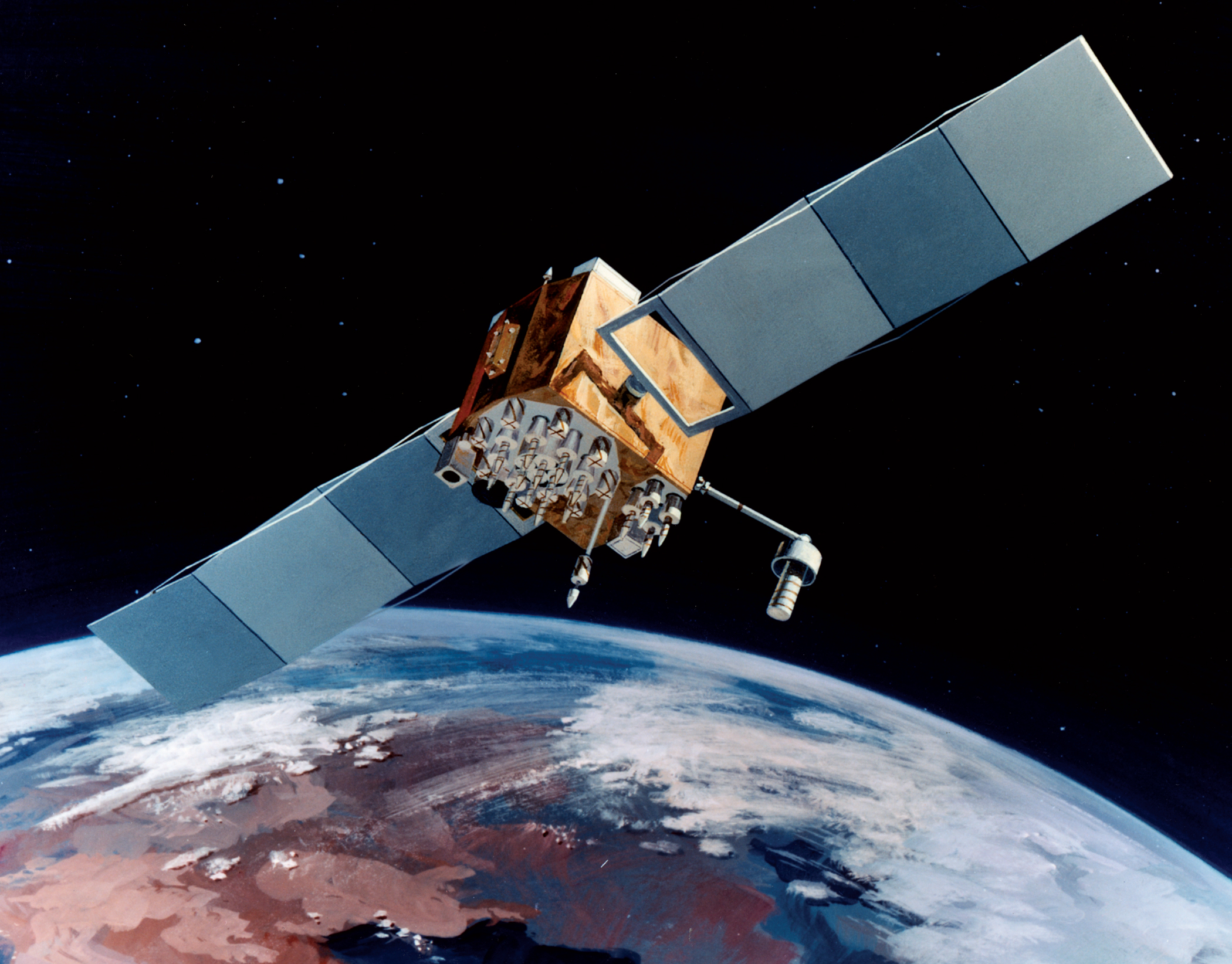
- A Block IIF GPS satellite
- Mission type: Navigation
- Operator: US Air Force
- COSPAR ID: 2012-053A
- SATCAT no.: 38833
- Mission duration: 12 years (planned)

Spacecraft properties
- Spacecraft: GPS SVN-65 (IIF-3)
- Spacecraft type: GPS Block IIF
- Manufacturer: Boeing
- Launch mass: 1,630 kilograms (3,590 lb)

Start of mission
- Launch date: 4 October 2012, 12:10 UTC
- Rocket: Delta IV-M+(4,2), D361
- Launch site: Cape Canaveral SLC-37B
- Contractor: ULA

Orbital parameters
- Reference system: Geocentric
- Regime: Medium Earth (Semi-synchronous)
- Perigee altitude: 20,132 kilometers (12,509 mi)
- Apogee altitude: 20,231 kilometers (12,571 mi)
- Inclination: 54.87 degrees
- Period: 717.96 minutes

USA-239, also known as GPS IIF-3, GPS SVN-65, and Navstar-67 is an American navigation satellite which forms part of the Global Positioning System. It was the third of twelve Block IIF satellites to be launched.

Built by Boeing and launched by United Launch Alliance, USA-239 was launched at 12:10 UTC on 4 October 2012, atop a Delta IV carrier rocket, flight number D361, flying in the Medium+(4,2) configuration. The launch took place from Space Launch Complex 37B at the Cape Canaveral Air Force Station, and placed USA-239 directly into medium Earth orbit. The rocket's second stage failed to provide the expected full thrust in all of its three burns due to a leak above the narrow throat portion of the thrust chamber, however the stage had enough propellant margins to put the satellite in the correct orbit.

As of 15 April 2026, USA-239 was in an orbit with a perigee of 19,717.2 kilometers (12,251.70 mi), an apogee of 20,661.0 kilometers (12,838.15 mi.) a period of 718 minutes, and 53.6 degrees of inclination to the equator. It is used to broadcast the PRN 24 signal, and operates in slot 1 of plane A of the GPS constellation. The satellite has a design life of 15 years and a mass of 1,630 kilograms (3,590 lb). As of 2026 it remains in service.
