= USA-213 =

American navigation satellite used for GPS

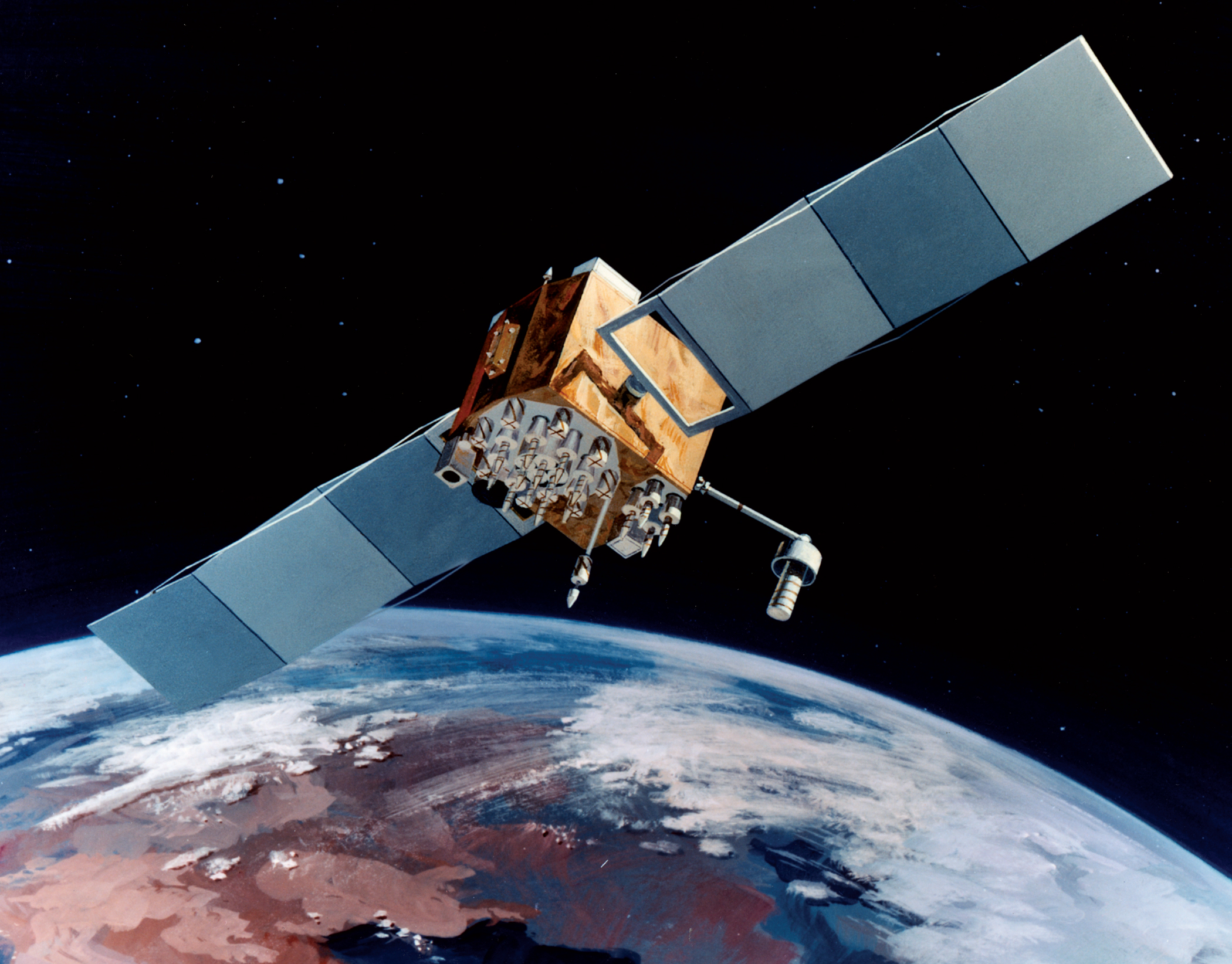
- Artist's impression of a GPS IIF satellite in orbit
- Names: GPS IIF SV-1; GPS SVN-62; NAVSTAR 65
- Mission type: Navigation
- Operator: U.S. Air Force
- COSPAR ID: 2010-022A
- SATCAT no.: 36585
- Mission duration: 12 years (planned)

Spacecraft properties
- Spacecraft: GPS SVN-62 (IIF-1)
- Spacecraft type: GPS Block IIF
- Manufacturer: Boeing
- Launch mass: 1,633 kg (3,600 lb)
- Power: 1952 watts

Start of mission
- Launch date: 28 May 2010, 03:00:00 UTC
- Rocket: Delta IV-M+(4,2), s/n D349
- Launch site: Cape Canaveral (CCAFS), SLC-37B
- Contractor: United Launch Alliance (ULA)
- Entered service: 27 August 2010

Orbital parameters
- Reference system: Geocentric orbit
- Regime: Medium Earth orbit (Semi-synchronous)
- Altitude: 20,460 km (12,710 mi)
- Inclination: 55.0°
- Period: 12 hours

USA-213, also known as GPS SVN-62, GPS IIF SV-1 and NAVSTAR 65, is the first satellite in the Block IIF series of Global Positioning System navigation satellites. It will be used to relay signals for the United States Air Force Navstar Global Positioning System (GPS). The satellite was launched at 03:00:00 UTC on 28 May 2010. It will be placed into plane B of the GPS constellation, and will transmit the PRN-25 signal. PRN-25 was previously broadcast by USA-79, which was retired in late 2009 after almost eighteen years of service.

== Spacecraft ==
USA-213 is a 1,633 kg (3,600 lb) spacecraft, which is expected to remain in service for at least twelve years. In addition to broadcasting the same signals as previous satellites, it will also broadcast the L5 signal, and a military signal known as M-code. Its signal accuracy is expected to be twice that of its predecessors. It is the sixty-first GPS satellite to be launched, and the fiftieth Block II spacecraft.

GPS IIF spacecraft are built by Boeing, under a contract which was originally signed in 1996. At the time, thirty three satellites were planned, however this has since decreased to twelve.

== Launch ==
GPS IIF SV-1 was launched on a United Launch Alliance Delta IV-M+(4,2) launch vehicle, flying from Space Launch Complex 37B at the Cape Canaveral Air Force Station (CCAFS). This made it the first GPS satellite to be launched on an Evolved Expendable Launch Vehicle (EELV), and the first time since 1985 that anything other than a Delta II had been used to launch one.

The launch occurred successfully at 03:00:00 UTC on 28 May 2010, at the start of a nineteen-minute launch window. It was originally scheduled to occur in 2006, however program and engineering delays resulted in it slipping to 2010. The first launch attempt was made on 21 May 2010, during a launch window opening at 03:25 UTC and closing at 03:43. A problem with spacecraft telemetry was detected, but resolved in time for an attempt to be made at the end of the window, however it recurred during the last minutes of the countdown. With no launch window remaining, the launch was scrubbed. The launch was rescheduled for 24 May 2010, between 03:17 and 03:35 UTC, but scrubbed early in the countdown to allow further time to resolve the problem which had occurred during the previous attempt. An attempt on 25 May 2010, targeting the start of an eighteen-minute window at 03:13, resulted in a scrub after a hold was called less than ten seconds before the rocket was scheduled to launch, due to a problem with the thrust vectoring of the solid rocket motors. Launch attempts on 26 and 27 May 2010 (UTC) were not possible as the Eastern Range had to be reconfigured to support the landing of Space Shuttle Atlantis, returning from STS-132.

Unlike earlier GPS satellites, which were launched on Atlas E/F and Delta II rockets, GPS IIF SV-1 was placed directly into its operational orbit, eliminating the need for an apogee motor.

== Operational status ==
After the launch the satellite underwent a testing period which was scheduled to last between 90 and 120 days. It was declared operational 27 August 2010 at 04:10 UTC.

== See also ==
- Compass-G1
- GPS IIR-1
- USA-206
