= USA-232 =

American navigation satellite used for GPS

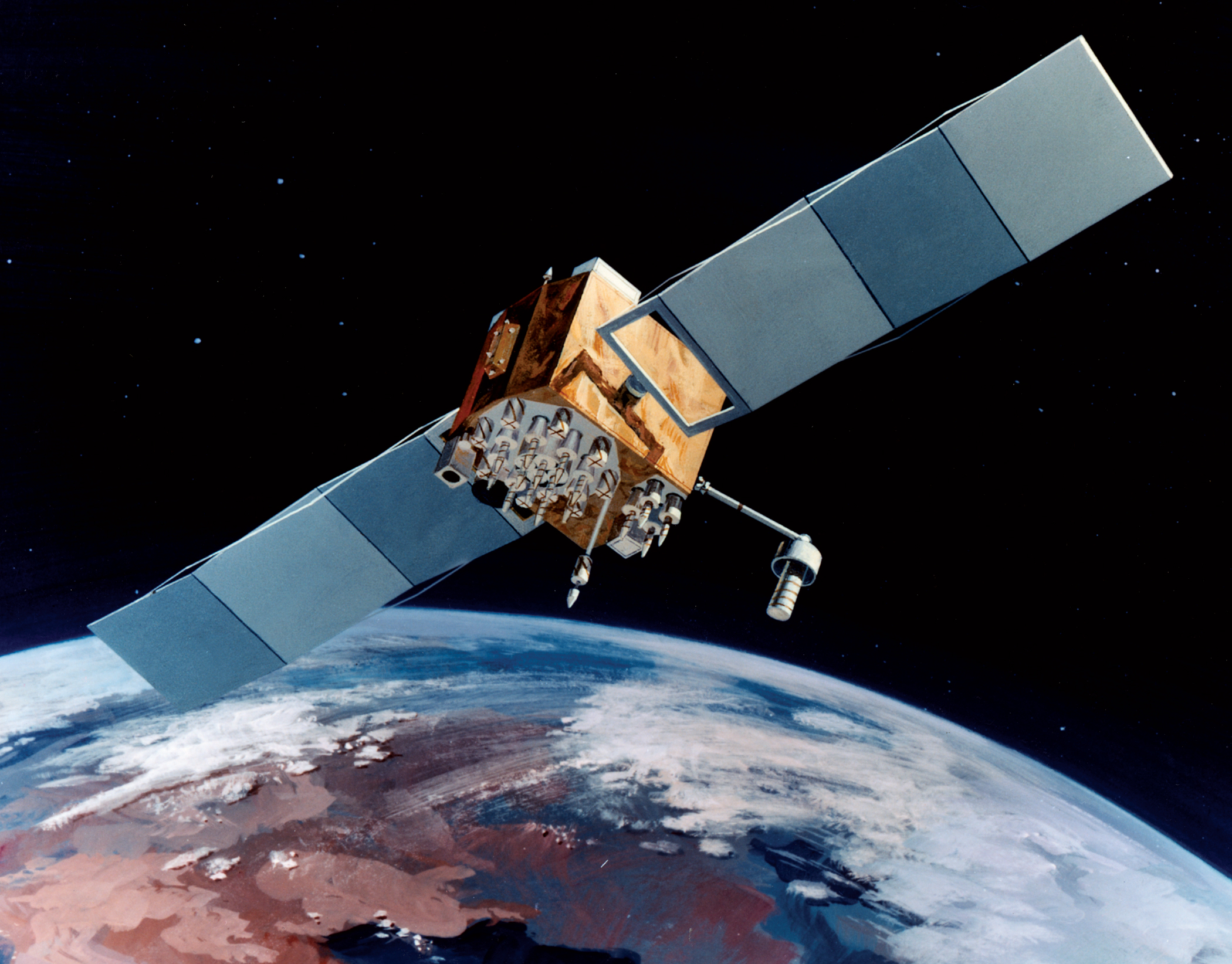
- A Block IIF GPS satellite
- Mission type: Navigation
- Operator: US Air Force
- COSPAR ID: 2011-036A
- SATCAT no.: 37753
- Mission duration: 12 years (planned)

Spacecraft properties
- Spacecraft: GPS SVN-63 (IIF-2)
- Spacecraft type: GPS Block IIF
- Manufacturer: Boeing
- Launch mass: 1,630 kilograms (3,590 lb)

Start of mission
- Launch date: 16 July 2011, 06:41 UTC
- Rocket: Delta IV-M+(4,2), D355
- Launch site: Cape Canaveral SLC-37B
- Contractor: ULA

Orbital parameters
- Reference system: Geocentric
- Regime: Medium Earth (Semi-synchronous)
- Perigee altitude: 20,452 kilometers (12,708 mi)
- Apogee altitude: 20,463 kilometers (12,715 mi)
- Inclination: 55 degrees
- Period: 729.16 minutes

USA-232, also known as GPS IIF-2, and GPS SVN-63, is an American navigation satellite which forms part of the Global Positioning System. It was the second of twelve Block IIF satellites to be launched.

Built by Boeing and launched by United Launch Alliance, USA-232 was launched at 06:41 UTC on 16 July 2011, atop a Delta IV carrier rocket, flight number D355, flying in the Medium+(4,2) configuration. The launch took place from Space Launch Complex 37B at the Cape Canaveral Air Force Station, and placed USA-232 directly into medium Earth orbit.

As of 24 July 2011, USA-232 was in an orbit with a perigee of 20,452 kilometers (12,708 mi), an apogee of 20,463 kilometers (12,715 mi), a period of 729.16 minutes, and 55.0 degrees of inclination to the equator. It is used to broadcast the PRN 01 signal, and operates in slot 2 of plane D of the GPS constellation. The satellite has a design life of 15 years and a mass of 1,630 kilograms (3,590 lb).

On 10 July 2023, the satellite was operating at D2A in the D plane. It experienced a clock anomaly that caused the Space Force's 2nd Space Operations Squadron to set the satellite as “off” (Unhealthy) to all users until further notice. It is operating on its last Rubidium Frequency Standard clock, which demonstrated instances of unpredictable performance starting in January 2023. The GPS community concurred in transferring SVN 63 out of the active constellation and into a test status.
