= GPS Block IIF =

Operational generation of GPS satellites

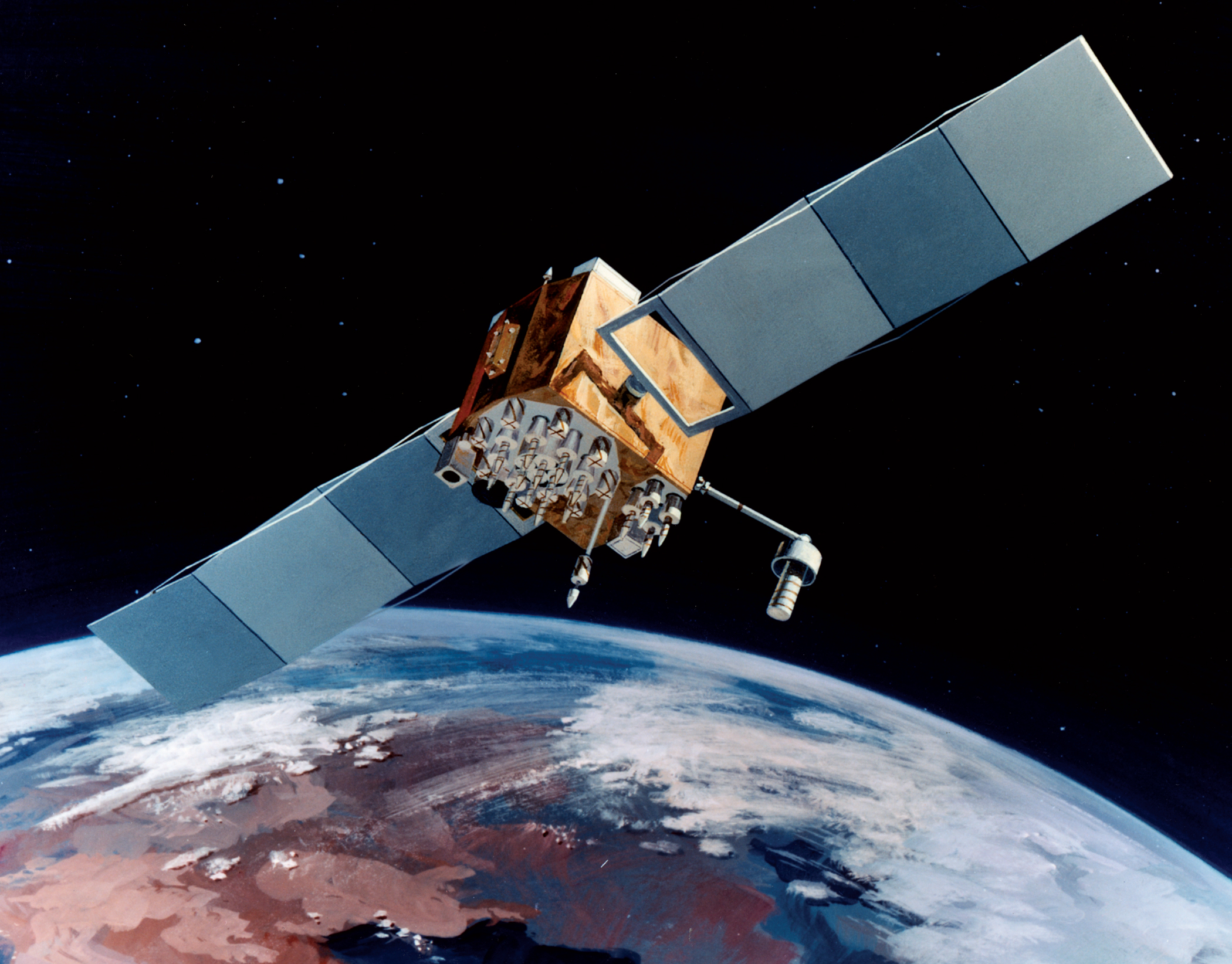
- Artist's impression of a Block IIF GPS satellite in orbit
- Manufacturer: Boeing
- Country of origin: United States
- Operator: United States Air Force
- Applications: Satellite navigation

Specifications
- Launch mass: 1,633 kg (3,600 lb)
- Power: 1952 watts (end of life)
- Regime: Semi-synchronous MEO
- Design life: 12 years (planned)

Production
- Status: Production completed
- On order: 0
- Built: 12
- Launched: 12
- Operational: 11
- Maiden launch: GPS IIF SV-1; 28 May 2010, 03:00 UTC
- Last launch: GPS IIF-12; 5 February 2016, 13:38 UTC

GPS Block IIF, or GPS IIF is an interim class of GPS (satellite) which were used to bridge the gap between previous Navstar Global Positioning System generations until the GPS Block III satellites became operational. They were built by Boeing, operated by the United States Air Force, and launched by the United Launch Alliance (ULA) using Evolved Expendable Launch Vehicles (EELV). They are the final component of the Block II GPS constellation to be launched. On 5 February 2016, the final Block IIF satellite was successfully launched, completing the series.

The spacecraft have a mass of 1,633 kg (3,600 lb) and a design life of 12 years. Like earlier GPS satellites, Block IIF spacecraft operate in semi-synchronous medium Earth orbits, with an altitude of approximately 20,460 km (12,710 mi), and an orbital period of twelve hours.

The satellites supplement and partially replace the GPS Block IIA satellites that were launched between 1990 and 1997 with a design life of 7.5 years. The final satellite of the Block IIA series was decommissioned on 9 October 2019. The operational constellation now includes Block IIR, IIRM, IIF and III variants.

Because the Evolved Expendable Launch Vehicles are more powerful than the Delta II, which was used to orbit earlier Block II GPS satellites, they can place the satellites directly into their operational orbits. As a result, Block IIF satellites do not carry apogee kick motors. The original contract for Block IIF, signed in 1996, called for 33 spacecraft. This was later reduced to 12, and program delays and technical problems pushed the first launch from 2006 to 2010.

== New characteristics ==
- Broadcasting L5 "safety of life" navigation signal demonstrated on USA-203
- Broadcasting a new M-code signal
- Doubling in the predicted accuracy
- Better resistance to jamming
- Reprogrammable processors that can receive software uploads
- The first GPS satellites not to have Selective Availability (SA) hardware installed, which degraded civilian accuracy when turned on in the original satellite fleet

== Launch history ==
Of the 12 GPS Block IIF satellites launched, 11 are currently operational.

GPS Block IIF satellites
Satellite	USA designation	Launch date (UTC)	Rocket	Launch site	Status	Notes	Ref.
GPS IIF-1 (Polaris)	USA-213	28 May 2010; 03:00	Delta IV-M+(4,2), s/n D349	Cape Canaveral, SLC-37B	In service		
GPS IIF-2 (Sirius)	USA-232	16 July 2011; 06:41	Delta IV-M+(4,2), s/n D355	Cape Canaveral, SLC-37B	Retired; 10 August 2023		
GPS IIF-3 (Arcturus)	USA-239	4 October 2012; 12:10	Delta IV-M+(4,2), s/n D361	Cape Canaveral, SLC-37B	In service	This launch came shortly before the 10th anniversary of the inaugural Delta IV launch.	
GPS IIF-4 (Vega)	USA-242	15 May 2013; 21:38	Atlas V 401 s/n AV-039	Cape Canaveral, SLC-41	In service		
GPS IIF-5 (Canopus)	USA-248	21 February 2014; 01:59	Delta IV-M+(4,2) s/n D365	Cape Canaveral, SLC-37B	In service		
GPS IIF-6 (Rigel)	USA-251	17 May 2014; 00:03	Delta IV-M+(4,2) s/n D366	Cape Canaveral, SLC-37B	In service		
GPS IIF-7 (Capella)	USA-256	2 August 2014; 03:23	Atlas V 401 s/n AV-048	Cape Canaveral, SLC-41	In service		
GPS IIF-8 (Spica)	USA-258	29 October 2014; 17:21	Atlas V 401 s/n AV-050	Cape Canaveral, SLC-41	In service		
GPS IIF-9 (Deneb)	USA-260	25 March 2015; 18:36	Delta IV-M+(4,2) s/n D371	Cape Canaveral, SLC-37B	In service		
GPS IIF-10 (Antares)	USA-262	15 July 2015; 15:36	Atlas V 401 s/n AV-055	Cape Canaveral, SLC-41	In service		
GPS IIF-11 (Altair)	USA-265	31 October 2015; 16:13	Atlas V 401 s/n AV-060	Cape Canaveral, SLC-41	In service		
GPS IIF-12 (Betelgeuse)	USA-266	5 February 2016; 13:38	Atlas V 401 s/n AV-057	Cape Canaveral, SLC-41	In service		
Last updated 22 January 2026

== See also ==
- BeiDou Navigation Satellite System
- BeiDou-2 (COMPASS) navigation system
- Galileo (satellite navigation)
- GLONASS
- Quasi-Zenith Satellite System
