= List of Thor and Delta launches (2000–2009) =

Between 2000 and 2009, there were 72 Thor-derived rockets launched, of which 70 were successful, giving a 97.2% success rate.

== Launch statistics ==
=== Rocket configurations ===
- Delta II (7000)
- Delta II (7000H)
- Delta III (8000)
- Delta IV Medium
- Delta IV Medium+ (4,2)
- Delta IV Medium+ (5,4)
- Delta IV Heavy

=== Launch sites ===
- Cape Canaveral SLC-17A
- Cape Canaveral SLC-17B
- Cape Canaveral SLC-37B
- Vandenberg SLC-2W
- Vandenberg SLC-6

=== Launch outcomes ===
- Success
- Partial Failure

== Launch history ==
=== 2000 === There were 7 Thor missiles launched in 2000. 6 of the 7 launches were successful, giving an 85.7% success rate.
Flight No.	Date / time (UTC)	Rocket, Configuration	Launch site	Payload	Payload mass	Orbit	Customer	Launch outcome
276	February 8, 2000; 21:24	Delta II 7420-10C	CCAFS SLC-17B	Globalstar 7	550 kg	LEO	Globalstar	Success
276	Mobile Communications							
277	March 25, 2000; 20:34	Delta II 7326-9.5	VAFB SLC-2W	IMAGE	210 kg	Polar	NASA	Success
277	Solar Wind Monitoring							
278	May 11, 2000; 01:48	Delta II 7925-9.5	CCAFS SLC-17A	USA-150 (GPS IIR-4)	2,032 kg	MEO	US Air Force	Success
278	Navigation satellite							
279	July 16, 2000; 09:17	Delta II 7925-9.5	CCAFS SLC-17A	USA-151 (GPS IIR-5)	2,032 kg	MEO	US Air Force	Success
279	Navigation satellite							
280	August 23, 2000; 11:05	Delta III 8930	CCAFS SLC-17B	DM-F3	4383 kg	GTO	US Air Force	Partial failure
280	Reached lower than planned orbit, final flight of Delta III, Demosat							
281	November 10, 2000; 17:14	Delta II 7925-9.5	CCAFS SLC-17A	USA-154 (GPS IIR-6)	2,032 kg	MEO	US Air Force	Success
281	Navigation satellite							
282	November 21, 2000; 18:24	Delta II 7320-10	VAFB SLC-2W	EO-1/SAC-C	573 kg	LEO	NASA	Success
282	Earth Observing							
=== 2001 === There were 7 Thor missiles launched in 2001. All 7 launches were successful.
Flight No.	Date / time (UTC)	Rocket, Configuration	Launch site	Payload	Payload mass	Orbit	Customer	Launch outcome
283	January 30, 2001; 07:55	Delta II 7925-9.5	CCAFS SLC-17A	USA-156 (GPS IIR-7)	2,032 kg	MEO	US Air Force	Success
283	Navigation satellite							
284	April 7, 2001; 15:02	Delta II 7925-9.5	CCAFS SLC-17A	Mars Odyssey	376.3 kg	Heliocentric	NASA	Success
284	Mars orbiter							
285	May 18, 2001; 17:45	Delta II 7925-9.5	CCAFS SLC-17B	GeoLITE	1800 kg	GTO	US NRO	Success
285	Technology Demonstrator							
286	June 30, 2001; 19:46	Delta II 7425-10	CCAFS SLC-17B	WMAP	763 kg	Sun-Earth L2	NASA	Success
286	Cosmic microwave background experiments, First flight with a 10-foot (3.0 m) composite fairing.							
287	August 8, 2001; 16:13	Delta II 7326-9.5	CCAFS SLC-17A	Genesis Probe	494 kg	Heliocentric	NASA	Success
287	Solar Wind sample return							
288	October 18, 2001; 18:51	Delta II 7320-10	VAFB SLC-2W	QuickBird	951 kg	SSO	DigitalGlobe	Success
288	Earth Imaging							
289	December 7, 2001; 15:07	Delta II 7920-10	VAFB SLC-2W	Jason-1/TIMED	1160 kg	LEO	NASA	Success
289	100th Delta II launch, Earth Observation							
=== 2002 === There were 4 Thor missiles launched in 2002. All 4 launches were successful.
Flight No.	Date / time (UTC)	Rocket, Configuration	Launch site	Payload	Payload mass	Orbit	Customer	Launch outcome
290	February 11, 2002; 17:43	Delta II 7920-10C	VAFB SLC-2W	Iridium IS-1	689 kg	LEO	Iridium Communications	Success
290	Mobile Communications							
291	May 4, 2002; 09:54	Delta II 7920-10L	VAFB SLC-2W	Aqua	3,117 kg	LEO	NASA	Success
291	Earth Observation							
292	July 3, 2002; 06:47	Delta II 7425	CCAFS SLC-17A	CONTOUR	328 kg	Heliocentric	NASA	Success
292	Payload later failed, Comet probe							
293	November 20, 2002; 22:39	Delta IV-M+ (4,2)	CCAFS SLC-37B	Eutelsat W5	1,400 kg	GTO	Eutelsat	Success
293	First Delta IV launch, Commercial communications satellite							
=== 2003 === There were 9 Thor missiles launched in 2003. All 9 launches were successful.
Flight No.	Date / time (UTC)	Rocket, Configuration	Launch site	Payload	Payload mass	Orbit	Customer	Launch outcome
294	January 13, 2003; 00:45	Delta II 7320-10	VAFB SLC-2W	ICESat, CHIPSat	1304 kg	SSO	NASA	Success
294	Earth science satellite, Astronomical satellite							
295	January 29, 2003; 18:06	Delta II 7925-9.5	CCAFS SLC-17B	USA-166 (GPS IIR-8)	2,032 kg	MEO	US Air Force	Success
295	Navigation satellite							
296	March 11, 2003; 00:59	Delta IV-M	CCAFS SLC-37B	USA-167 (DSCS-3 A3)	Classified	GTO	US Air Force	Success
296	Military communications satellite, First Delta IV Medium launch, First USAF EELV mission							
297	March 31, 2003; 22:09	Delta II 7925-9.5	CCAFS SLC-17A	USA-168 (GPS IIR-9)	2,032 kg	MEO	US Air Force	Success
297	Navigation satellite							
298	June 10, 2003; 17:58	Delta II 7925-9.5	CCAFS SLC-17A	Spirit (MER-A)	185 kg	Heliocentric	NASA	Success
298	Mars rover							
299	July 8, 2003; 03:18	Delta II 7925H-9.5	CCAFS SLC-17B	Opportunity (MER-B)	185 kg	Heliocentric	NASA	Success
299	Mars rover, First Delta II Heavy launch (with GEM 46s used on the Delta III)							
300	August 25, 2003; 05:35	Delta II 7920H-9.5	CCAFS SLC-17B	Spitzer Space Telescope (SIRTF)	851.5 kg	Heliocentric	NASA	Success
300	Infra-red telescope, 300th Delta rocket mission, First Delta II Heavy launch without a third-stage motor							
301	August 29, 2003; 23:13	Delta IV-M	CCAFS SLC-37B	USA-170 (DSCS-3 B6)	Classified	GTO	US Air Force	Success
301	Military communications satellite							
302	December 21, 2003; 08:05	Delta II 7925-9.5	CCAFS SLC-17A	USA-175 (GPS IIR-10)	2,032 kg	MEO	US Air Force	Success
302	Navigation satellite							
=== 2004 === There were 8 Thor missiles launched in 2004. 7 of the 8 launches were successful, giving an 87.5% success rate.
Flight No.	Date / time (UTC)	Rocket, Configuration	Launch site	Payload	Payload mass	Orbit	Customer	Launch outcome
303	March 20, 2004; 17:53	Delta II 7925-9.5	CCAFS SLC-17B	USA-177 (GPS IIR-11)	2,032 kg	MEO	US Air Force	Success
303	Navigation satellite							
304	April 20, 2004; 16:57	Delta II 7920-10C	VAFB SLC-2W	Gravity Probe B	3,100 kg	Polar Orbit	NASA	Success
304	Science satellite							
305	June 23, 2004; 22:54	Delta II 7925-9.5	CCAFS SLC-17B	USA-178 (GPS IIR-12)	2,032 kg	MEO	US Air Force	Success
305	Navigation satellite							
306	July 15, 2004; 10:02	Delta II 7920-10L	VAFB SLC-2W	Aura	2,970 kg	SSO	NASA	Success
306	Atmospheric science satellite, First use of a stretched 10-foot (3.0 m)-wide fairing							
307	August 3, 2004; 06:15	Delta II 7925H-9.5	CCAFS SLC-17B	MESSENGER	1,107.9 kg	Heliocentric	NASA	Success
307	Mercury probe							
308	November 6, 2004; 05:39	Delta II 7925-9.5	CCAFS SLC-17B	USA-180 (GPS IIR-13)	2,032 kg	MEO	US Air Force	Success
308	Navigation satellite							
309	November 20, 2004; 17:16	Delta II 7320-10C	CCAFS SLC-17A	Swift	843 kg	LEO	NASA	Success
309	Gamma-ray telescope							
310	December 21, 2004; 21:50	Delta IV Heavy	CCAFS SLC-37B	DemoSat / 3CS-1 / 3CS-2	>6020 kg	GSO (planned)		Partial failure
310	Demonstration payload, Payloads did not reach correct orbits, First Delta IV Heavy launch							
=== 2005 === There were 3 Thor missiles launched in 2005. All 3 launches were successful.
Flight No.	Date / time (UTC)	Rocket, Configuration	Launch site	Payload	Payload mass	Orbit	Customer	Launch outcome
311	January 12, 2005; 18:47	Delta II 7925-9.5	CCAFS, SLC-17B	Deep Impact	650 kg	Heliocentric	NASA	Success
311	Comet probe							
312	May 20, 2005; 10:22	Delta II 7320-10C	VAFB, SLC-2W	NOAA-18	1457 kg	SSO	NOAA	Success
312	Weather satellite							
313	September 26, 2005; 03:37	Delta II 7925-9.5	CCAFS, SLC-17A	USA-183 (GPS IIR-M-1)	2,032 kg	MEO	U.S. Air Force	Success
313	Navigation satellite							
=== 2006 === There were 9 Thor missiles launched in 2006. All 9 launches were successful.
Flight No.	Date / time (UTC)	Rocket, Configuration	Launch site	Payload	Payload mass	Orbit	Customer	Launch outcome
314	April 28, 2006; 10:02	Delta II 7420-10C	VAFB SLC-2W	CloudSat, CALIPSO	1287 kg	SSO	NASA	Success
314	Two Atmospheric Satellites							
315	May 24, 2006; 22:11	Delta IV-M+ (4,2)	CCAFS SLC-37B	GOES-N (GOES-13)	3,133 kg	GTO	NASA/NOAA	Success
315	First Delta IV launch for NASA, Weather satellite							
316	June 21, 2006; 22:15	Delta II 7925-9.5	CCAFS SLC-17A	Microsatellite Technology Experiment (MiTEx) (USA 187/USA 188/USA 189)		GTO	US Air Force	Success
316	Navy upper stage test, small sat launch							
317	June 28, 2006; 03:33	Delta IV-M+ (4,2)	VAFB SLC-6	NROL-22		Molniya	US NRO	Success
317	First Delta IV launch from Vandenberg, Reconnaissance satellite							
318	September 25, 2006; 18:50	Delta II 7925-9.5	CCAFS SLC-17A	USA-190 (GPS IIR-M-2)	2,032 kg	MEO	US Air Force	Success
318	Navigation satellite							
319	October 26, 2006; 00:52	Delta II 7925-10L	CCAFS SLC-17B	STEREO	547 kg	Heliocentric	NASA	Success
319	Two solar observatories							
320	November 4, 2006; 13:53	Delta IV-M	VAFB SLC-6	DMSP F17	Classified	SSO	DoD	Success
320	First Delta IV launch into a LEO/SSO, Military weather satellite							
321	November 17, 2006; 19:12	Delta II 7925-9.5	CCAFS SLC-17A	USA-192 (GPS IIR-M-3)	2,032 kg	MEO	US Air Force	Success
321	Navigation satellite							
322	December 14, 2006; 21:00	Delta II 7920-10	VAFB SLC-2W	USA-193 (NROL-21)	2,300 kg	LEO	US NRO	Success
322	First launch by United Launch Alliance. Reconnaissance satellite. Payload failed shortly after deployment; would eventually be destroyed on February 20, 2008, by an ASAT. See also: Operation Burnt Frost							
=== 2007 === There were 9 Thor missiles launched in 2007. All 9 launches were successful.
Flight No.	Date / time (UTC)	Rocket, Configuration	Launch site	Payload	Payload mass	Orbit	Customer	Launch outcome
323	February 17, 2007; 23:01	Delta II 7925-10C	CCAFS SLC-17B	THEMIS	77 kg	HEO	NASA	Success
323	Five magnetosphere observatories							
324	June 8, 2007; 02:34	Delta II 7420-10	VAFB SLC-2W	COSMO-SkyMed 1		LEO	ASI	Success
324	Earth imaging/reconnaissance, Italian government							
325	August 4, 2007; 09:26	Delta II 7925	CCAFS SLC-17A	Phoenix	350 kg	Heliocentric	NASA	Success
325	Mars lander							
326	September 18, 2007; 18:35	Delta II 7920-10	VAFB SLC-2W	DigitalGlobe WorldView-1	2,500 kg	SSO	DigitalGlobe	Success
326	Commercial Earth imaging satellite							
327	September 27, 2007; 11:34	Delta II 7925H-9.5	CCAFS SLC-17B	Dawn	747.1 kg	Heliocentric	NASA	Success
327	Asteroid probe							
328	October 17, 2007; 12:23	Delta II 7925-9.5	CCAFS SLC-17A	USA-196 (GPS IIR-M-4)	2,032 kg	MEO	US Air Force	Success
328	Navigation satellite							
329	November 11, 2007; 01:50	Delta IV Heavy	CCAFS SLC-37B	DSP-23	5,250 kg	GSO	US Air Force	Success
329	First Delta IV launch contracted by United Launch Alliance and first operational Delta IV Heavy launch. Launch delayed due to damage to launch pad caused by a liquid oxygen leak. Missile warning satellite. Spacecraft eventually stopped transmitting in September 2008.							
330	December 9, 2007; 02:31	Delta II 7420-10	VAFB SLC-2W	COSMO-2		LEO	ASI	Success
330	Italian government, Earth imaging/reconnaissance							
331	December 20, 2007; 20:04	Delta II 7925-9.5	CCAFS SLC-17A	USA-199 (GPS IIR-M-5)	2,032 kg	MEO	US Air Force	Success
331	Navigation satellite							
=== 2008 === There were 5 Thor missiles launched in 2008. All 5 launches were successful.
Flight No.	Date / time (UTC)	Rocket, Configuration	Launch site	Payload	Payload mass	Orbit	Customer	Launch outcome
332	March 15, 2008; 06:10	Delta II 7925-9.5	CCAFS SLC-17A	USA-201 (GPS IIR-M-6)	2,032 kg	MEO	US Air Force	Success
332	80th consecutive successful launch, Navigation satellite							
333	June 11, 2008; 16:05	Delta II 7920H-10C	CCAFS SLC-17B	GLAST	4,303 kg	LEO	NASA	Success
333	First Delta II Heavy launch with a 10-foot (3.0 m)-wide composite fairing, Gamma-ray Telescope							
334	June 20, 2008; 07:46	Delta II 7320	VAFB SLC-2W	Jason-2	510 kg	LEO	NASA	Success
334	Ocean topography							
335	September 6, 2008; 18:50	Delta II 7420-10	VAFB SLC-2W	GeoEye-1	1,955 kg	LEO	DigitalGlobe	Success
335	Earth imaging							
336	October 25, 2008; 02:28	Delta II 7420	VAFB SLC-2W	COSMO-3		LEO	ASI	Success
336	Earth imaging/reconnaissance							
=== 2009 === There were 11 Thor missiles launched in 2009. All 11 launches were successful.
Flight No.	Date / time (UTC)	Rocket, Configuration	Launch site	Payload	Payload mass	Orbit	Customer	Launch outcome
337	January 18, 2009; 02:47	Delta IV Heavy	CCAFS SLC-37B	USA-202 (NROL-26)	Classified	GSO	US NRO	Success
337	Reconnaissance satellite							
338	February 6, 2009; 10:22	Delta II 7320-10C	VAFB SLC-2W	NOAA-19 (NOAA-N Prime)	1,440 kg	SSO	NOAA	Success
338	Weather satellite							
339	March 7, 2009; 03:49	Delta II 7925-10L	CCAFS SLC-17B	Kepler	478 kg	Heliocentric	NASA	Success
339	Space photometer							
340	March 24, 2009; 08:34	Delta II 7925-9.5	CCAFS SLC-17A	USA-203 (GPS IIR-M-7)	2,032 kg	MEO	US Air Force	Success
340	Navigation satellite							
341	May 5, 2009; 20:24	Delta II 7920-10C	VAFB SLC-2W	USA-205 (STSS-ATRR/GMD Block 2010 SRR)	Classified	LEO	MDA	Success
341	Satellite Technology							
342	June 27, 2009; 22:51	Delta IV-M+ (4,2)	CCAFS SLC-37B	GOES-O (GOES-14)	3,133 kg	GTO	NASA/NOAA	Success
342	Weather satellite							
343	August 17, 2009; 10:35	Delta II 7925	CCAFS SLC-17A	USA-206 (GPS IIRM-8)	2,032 kg	MEO	US Air Force	Success
343	Navigation satellite, Final launch from SLC-17A, Final Delta II launch for the USAF, Final use of the 7925 configuration							
344	September 25, 2009; 12:20	Delta II 7920-10C	CCAFS SLC-17B	USA-208/209 (STSS Demo/GMD Block 2006)		LEO	US Air Force	Success
344	90th consecutive success for Delta II, Missile Defense Technology test							
345	October 8, 2009; 18:51	Delta II 7920-10C	VAFB SLC-2W	WorldView-2	2,800 kg	LEO	DigitalGlobe	Success
345	Earth imaging/reconnaissance							
346	December 6, 2009; 01:47	Delta IV-M+ (5,4)	CCAFS SLC-37B	USA-211 (WGS-3)	5,987 kg	GTO	US Air Force	Success
346	First Delta IV Medium+ (5,4) launch, Communication satellite							
347	December 14, 2009; 14:09	Delta II 7320-10C	VAFB SLC-2W	WISE	347 kg	LEO	NASA	Success
347	Space telescope							

== Images ==
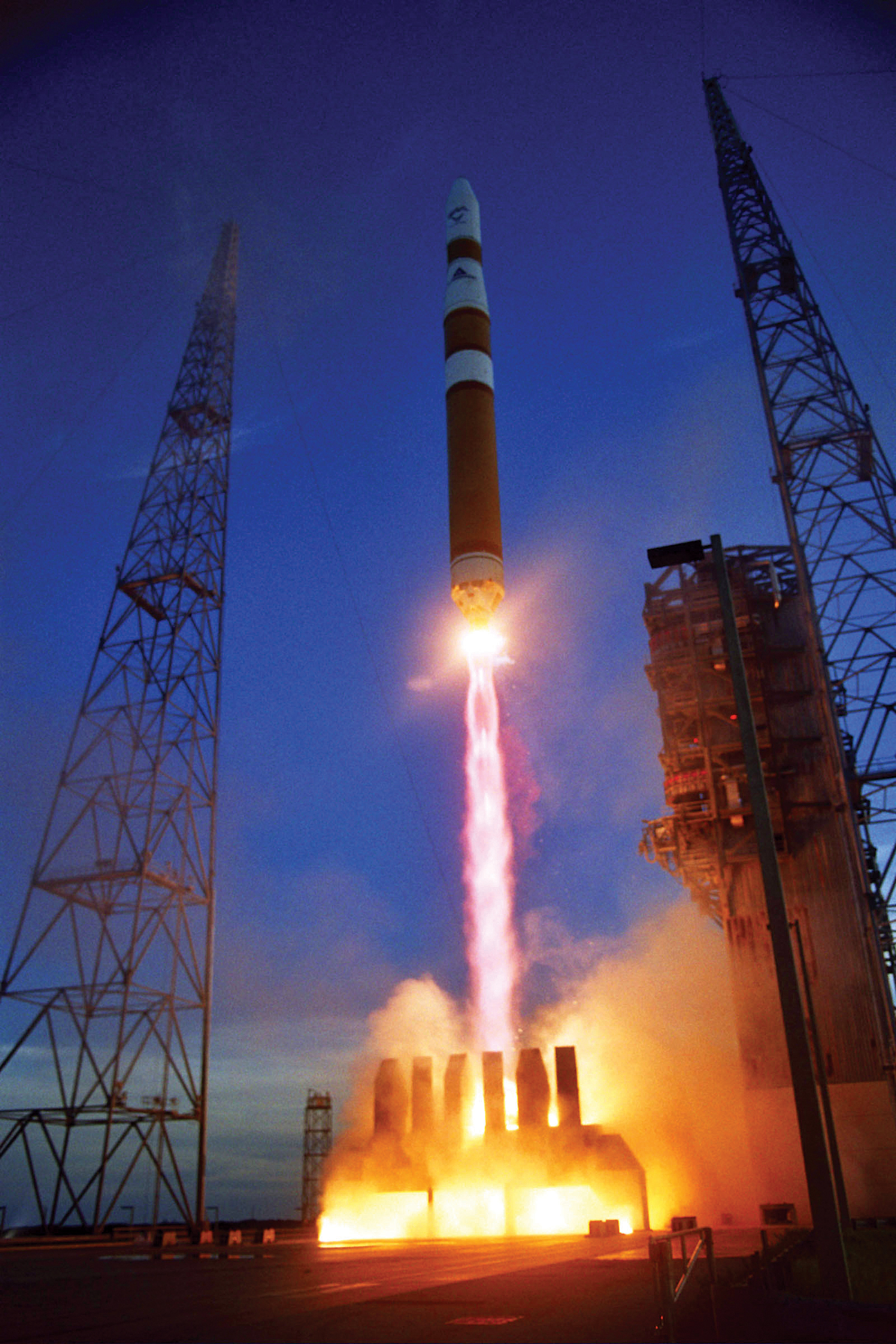
Delta IV Medium launch carrying DSCS III-B6

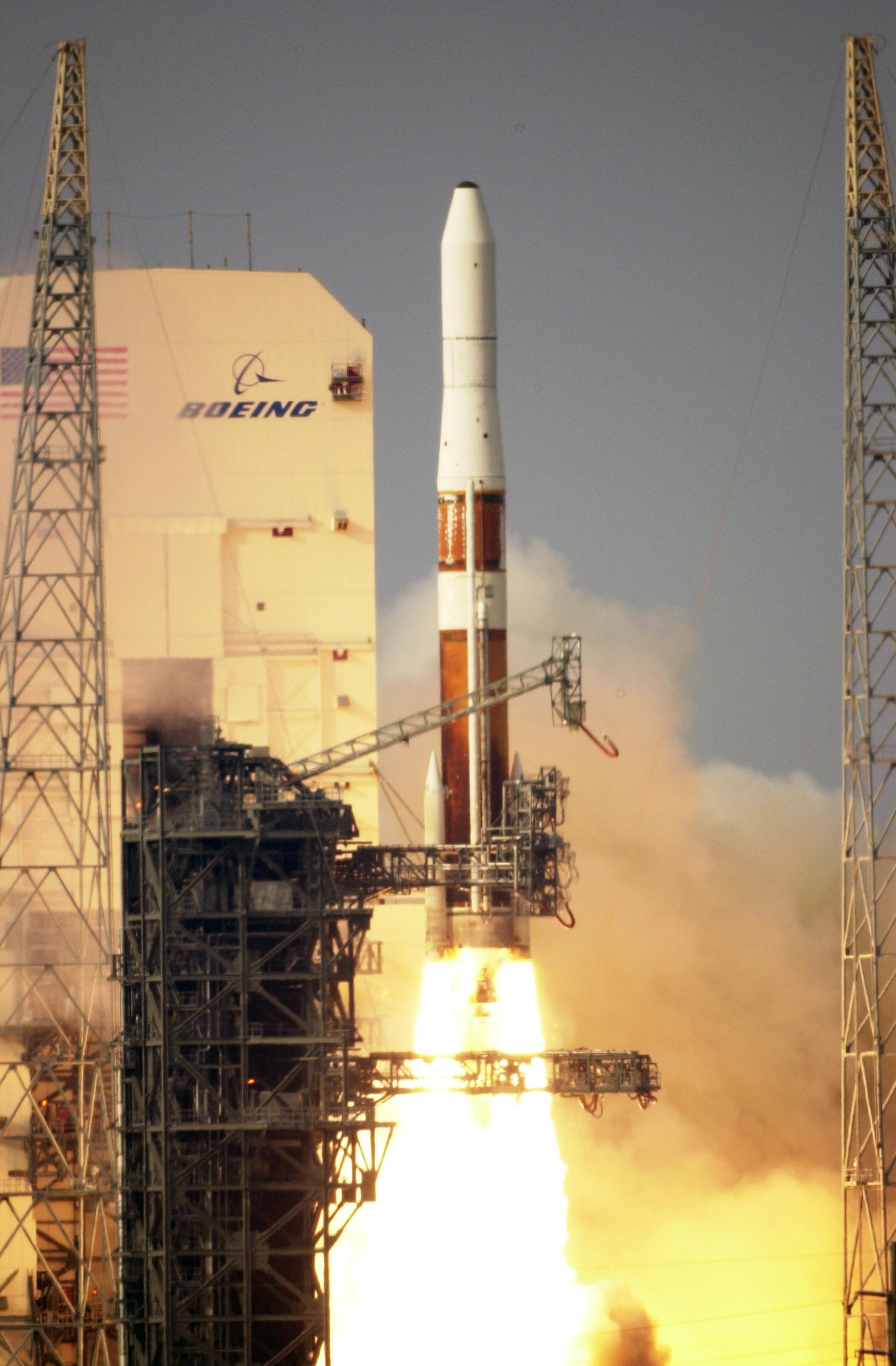
GOES-N launch on a Medium+ (4,2)

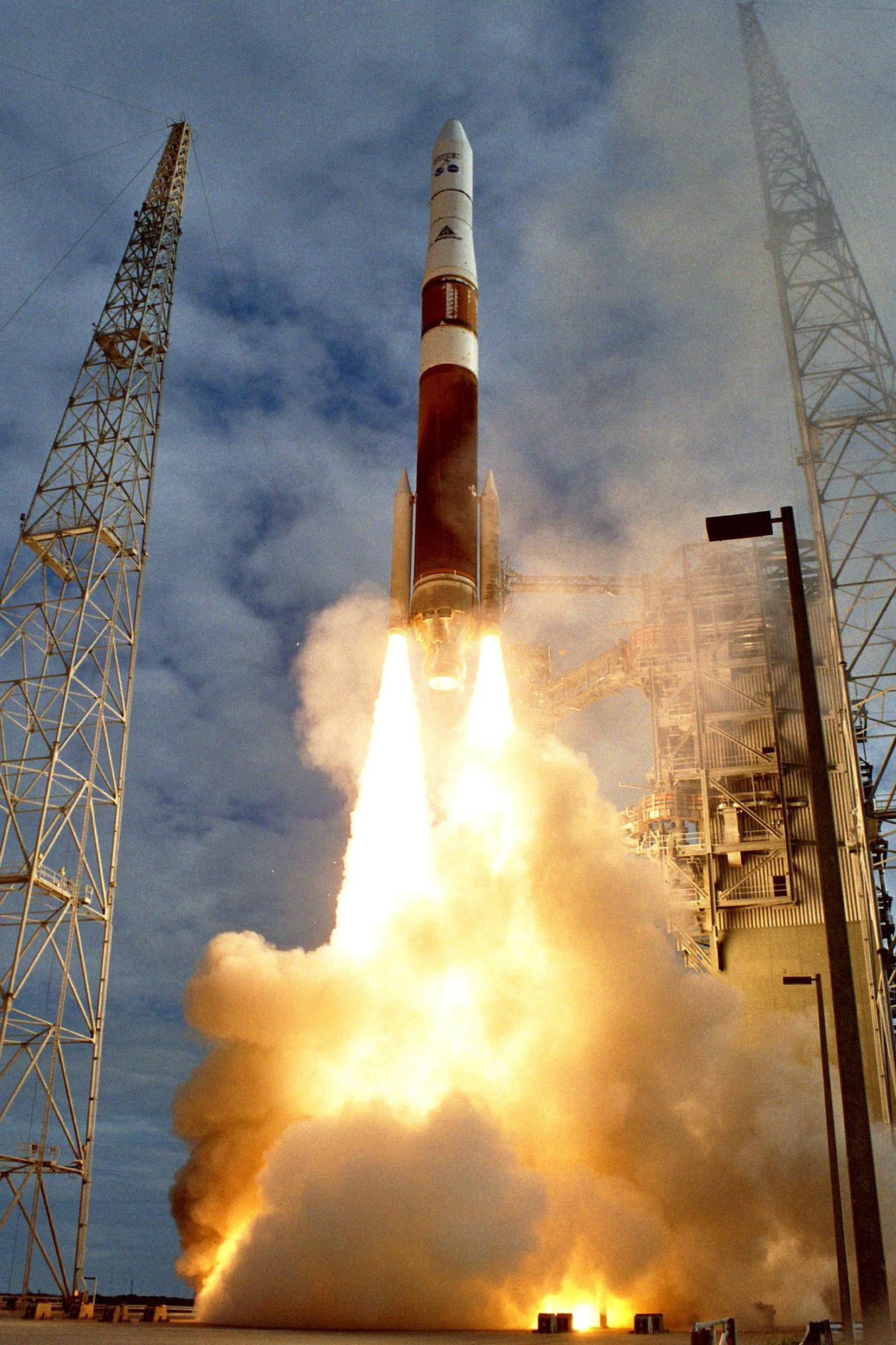
GOES-N launch on a Medium+ (4,2)

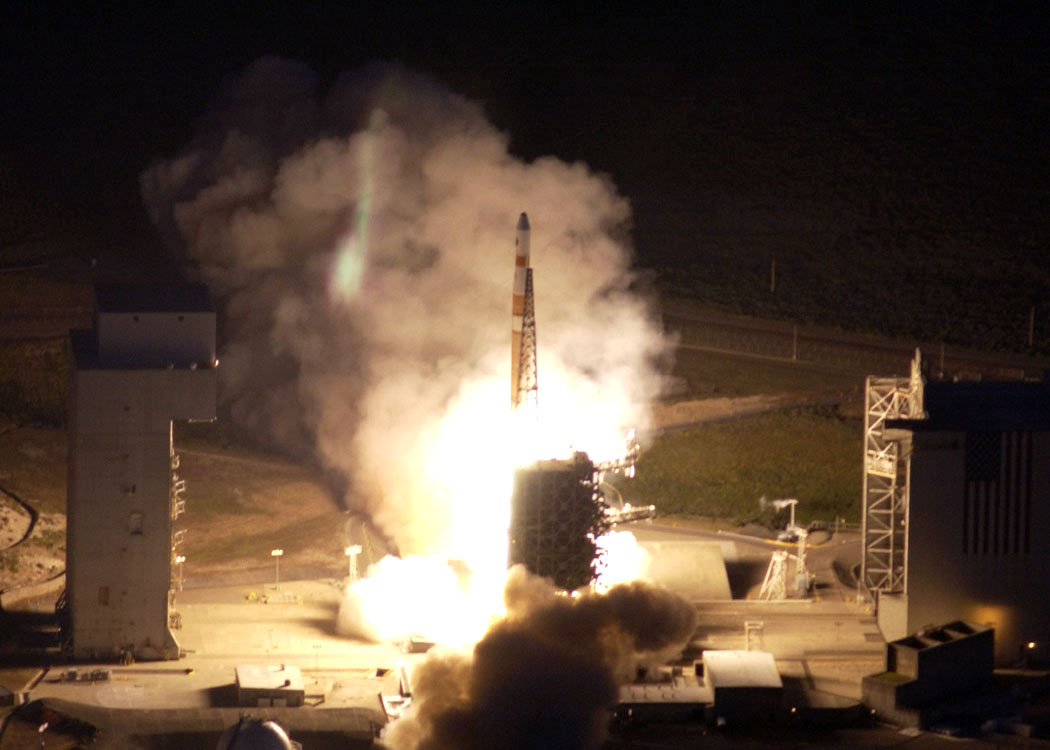
NROL-22 launch from SLC-6

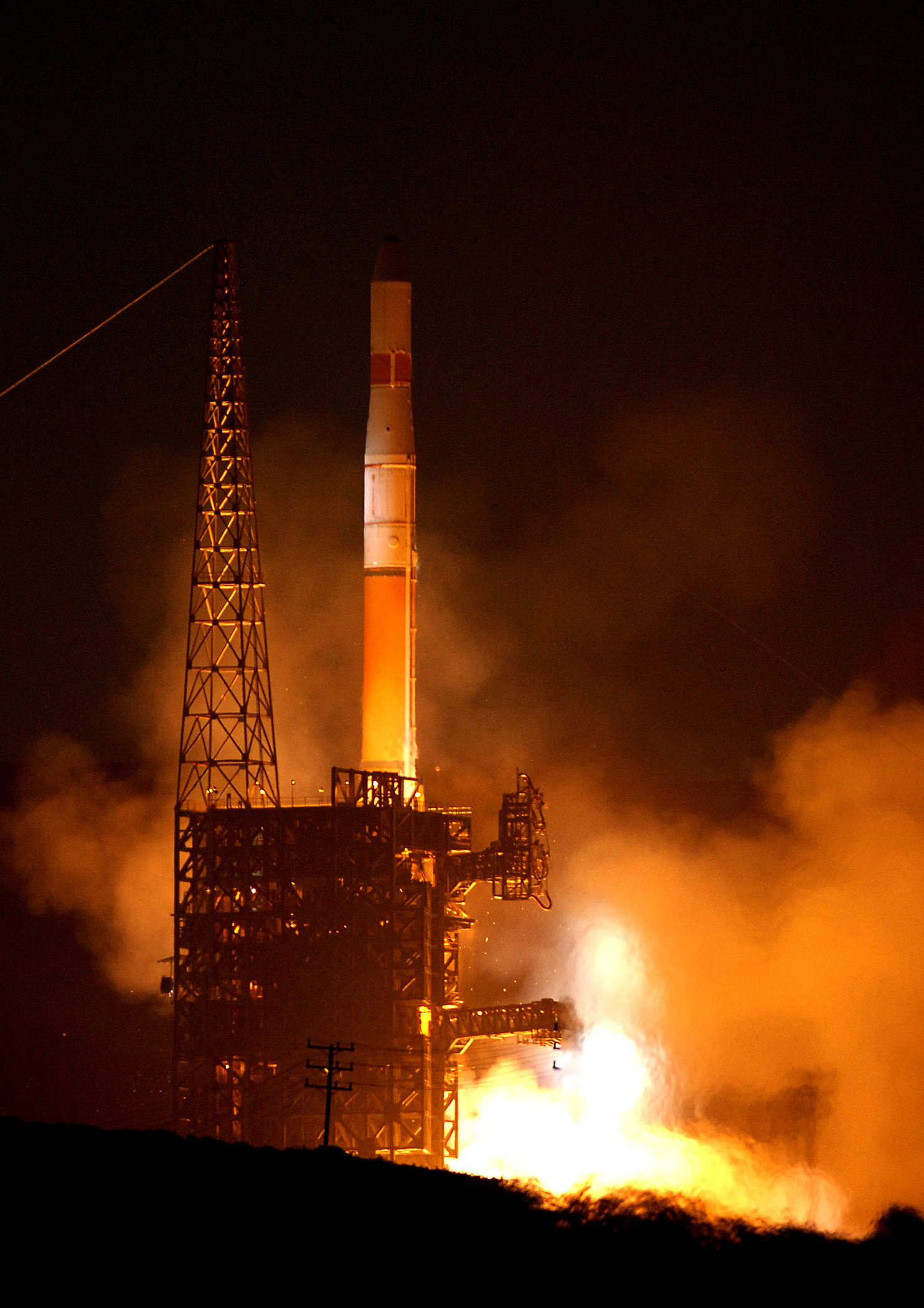
DMSP-17 launch on a Delta IV Medium

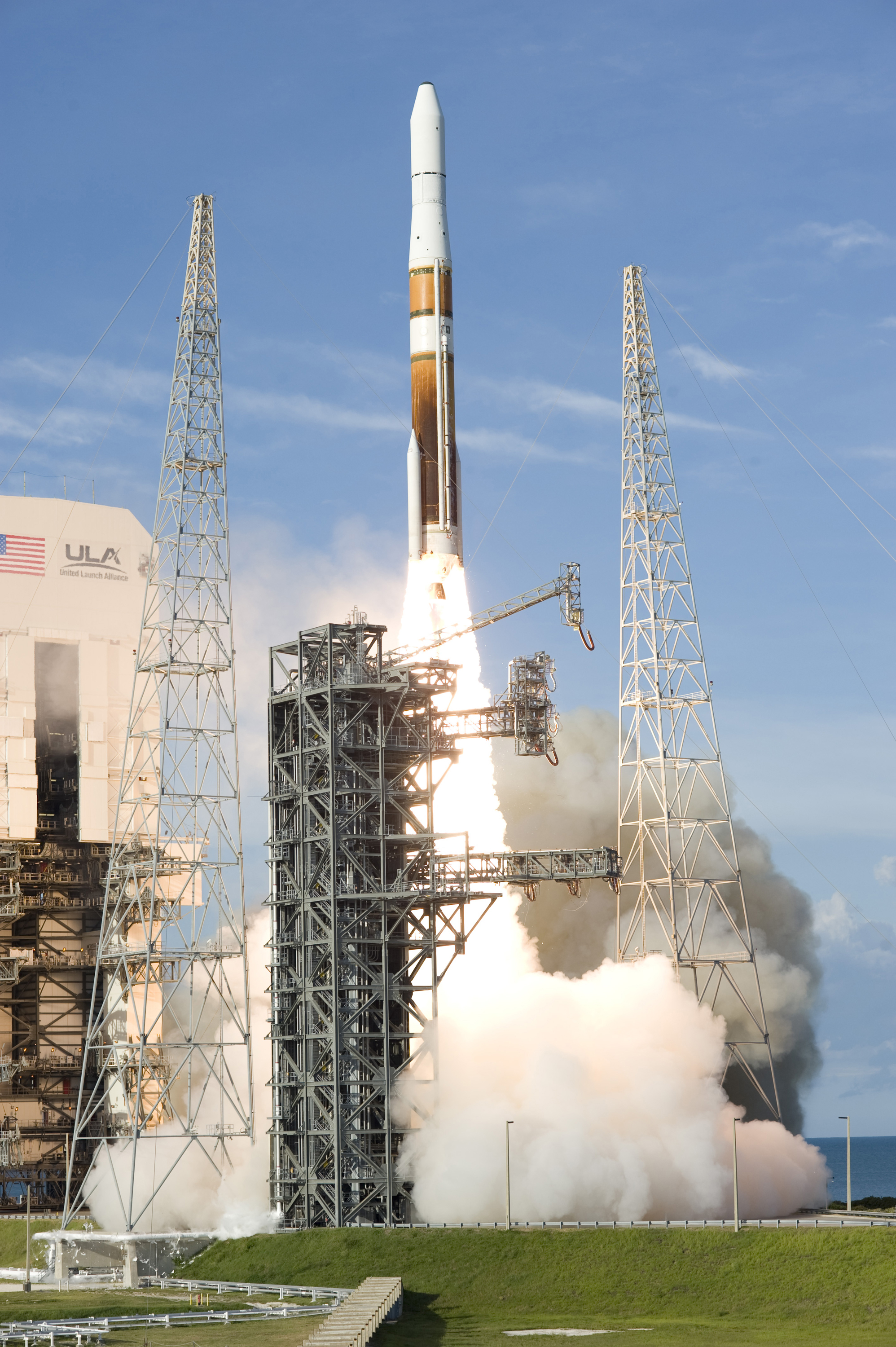
GOES-O launch on a Medium+ (4,2)

== See also ==
- List of Atlas launches (2000–09)
