= Troll Satellite Station =

Satellite ground station located at Troll in Queen Maud Land, Antarctica

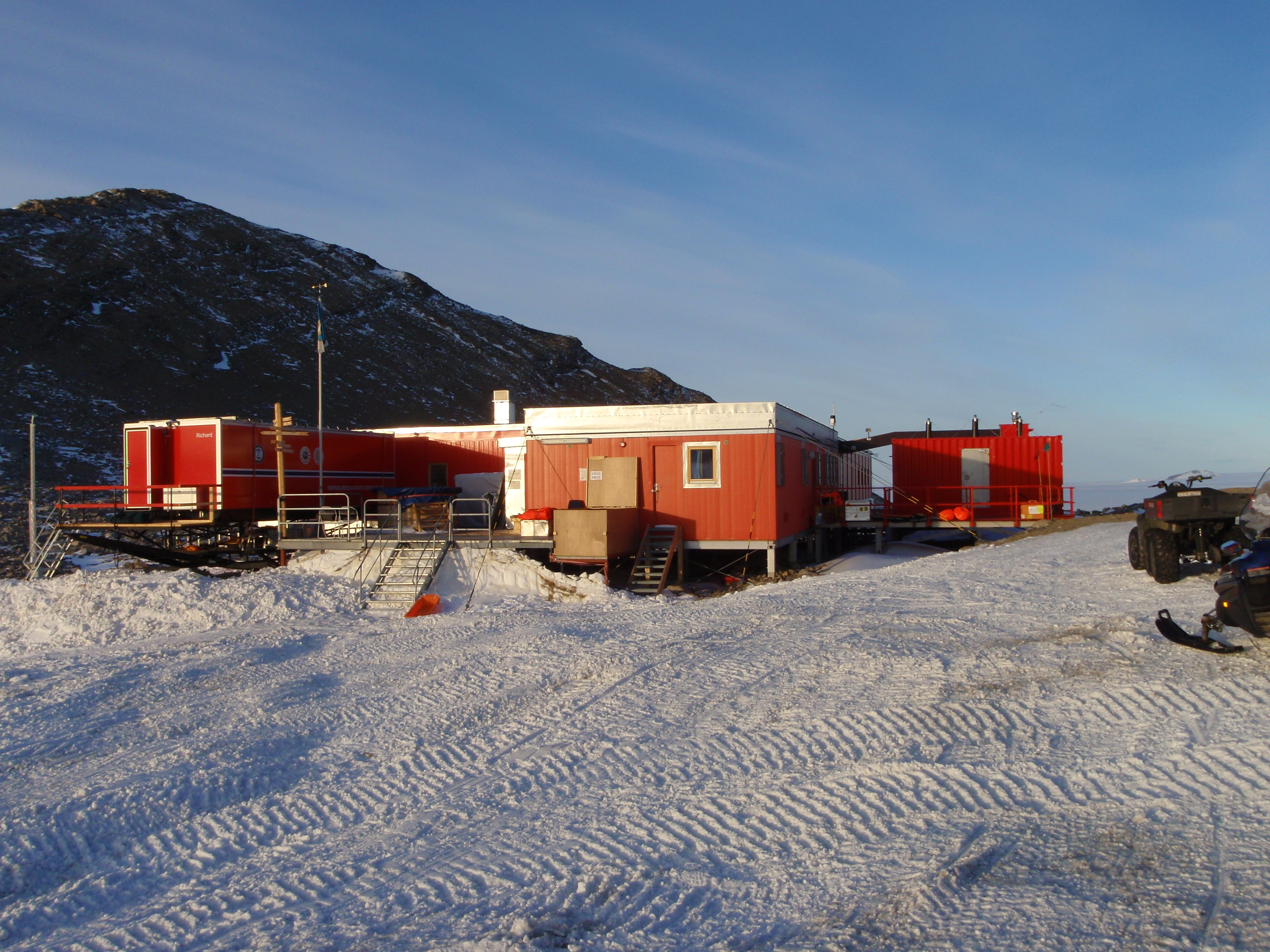
- Alternative names: TrollSat
- Location: Troll, Antarctic Treaty area
- Coordinates: 72°01′00″S 2°32′00″E
- Location within Antarctica

Troll Satellite Station (Norwegian: Troll satellittstasjon), commonly abbreviated TrollSat, is a satellite ground station located at Troll in Queen Maud Land, Antarctica. The earth station is owned by Kongsberg Satellite Services (KSAT), a joint venture between the Kongsberg Group and the Norwegian Space Center. The radomes are located on top of Jutulsessen, a nunatak area next to the research station at Troll. The research station is operated by the Norwegian Polar Institute, which also maintains the earth station. TrollSat started operations on 1 March 2007 and was officially opened on 20 January 2008.

The earth station serves low Earth orbit satellites and consists of a 7.3-meter (24 ft) antenna capable of S band and X band reception. Information is relayed using a 4.8-meter (16 ft) and a 7.6-meter (25 ft) C band uplink. Operations control is carried out by KSAT in Tromsø, Norway. Satellites using TrollSat include Radarsat, GeoEye, WorldView, Galileo and CHEOPS. The system is coordinated with Svalbard Satellite Station (SvalSat) in Longyearbyen, Norway, which combined offer downloading twice per orbit.

== History ==
Troll was established as a research station by the Norwegian Polar Institute in 1990. The station took its name from the surrounding jagged mountains, which resemble trolls of Norse mythology. Already at this time, there were proposals by the Norwegian Space Centre to establish an earth station at Troll, but the lack of all-year activity stranded the plans. Instead, SvalSat was established to serve as an earth station for NASA's Earth Observing System (EOS). Longyearbyen was selected because of its high latitude, which allows all satellites with an orbit above 500 kilometers (300 mi) to use only a single ground station—yet download from every orbit. The Svalbard facility opened on 15 April 1999 and was originally owned by the Norwegian Space Centre. Kongsberg Satellite Services was established in 2002 to jointly operate SvalSat and Tromsø Satellite Station (TSS).

In 2003, Norwegian authorities decided to extend its operations in Antarctica by establishing an all-year research station. By then, Norway was the only country with a territorial claim to Antarctica to not have an all-year research station on the continent. Construction was carried out from December 2004 through February 2005. To ease logistics, Norway took the initiative to establish Dronning Maud Land Air Network (DROMLAN), a cooperation between the countries with bases in Queen Maud Land to streamline transport costs. The permanent Troll Airfield was opened on 11 February 2005.

The basis for TrollSat was an agreement signed in 2006 between the Norwegian Polar Institute, the Norwegian Space Centre and Kongsberg Satellite Services. It specified that the Space Centre would install a Kongsberg-built radome, while the Polar Institute would provide power and undertake maintenance. In exchange, they could freely use the earth station for their own transmission needs. The commercial activities would be carried out by Kongsberg Satellite Services. A concern was raised regarding if satellite downloading would violate the Antarctic Treaty, but the Ministry of Foreign Affairs negated. The station started operations on 1 March 2007 and was officially opened by Prime Minister of Norway, Jens Stoltenberg.

== Operation ==
TrollSat is owned and operated by Kongsberg Satellite Services (KSAT), which is again equally owned by Kongsberg Defence and Aerospace and the Norwegian Space Centre, the latter which is again owned by the Ministry of Trade and Industry. KSAT is not tied to a particular operator of satellites and the antennas communicate with multiple satellites, thus reducing costs compared to dedicated ground stations. For a typical satellite, data is delivered to the end customer no more than thirty minutes after downloading.

KSAT operates two polar ground stations optimized for low Earth orbit (LEO) satellites, the other being SvalSat at Longyearbyen in Svalbard, Norway. These are the only two ground stations able to communicate with all orbits of LEO satellites. By using both stations, customers can download data twice per orbit, twenty-six times per day, with only a forty-minute maximum delay.

The ground station is connected to KSAT's Tromsø Network Operation Center, which is also connected to the TSS and SvalSat. This allows for redundancy as also TSS and TrollSat can be used to communicate with the satellites. The operation center is responsible for backup, scheduling and conflict resolution. The facility uses interoperability and shared ground services, such as a common protocol for communication and similar design of the antennas, to increase flexibility and reduce costs and risk.

TrollSat sees only a fraction of the business of SvalSat. Troll is used for downloading from the Canadian Space Agency's Radarsat-1 and Radarsat-2, and the private GeoEye-1, WorldView-1 and WorldView-2. It will also be one of thirty ground stations for the European Space Agency (ESA)'s satellite navigation system Galileo, and is Norway's main contribution to the project. It further serves ESA's Envisat and several National Aeronautics and Space Administration satellites.

== Facilities ==
Troll is located in the eastern part of Princess Martha Coast in Queen Maud Land, on the nunatak bare ground area Jutulsessen, at 1,270 meters (4,170 ft) above mean sea level. Troll is completely surrounded by the Antarctic ice sheet and is 235 kilometers (146 mi) from the coast. The research station facilities are owned by the Government of Norway through the Norwegian Directorate of Public Construction and Property. Operation of the facility carried by another government agency, the Norwegian Polar Institute. The station has a cold and dry climate, being located in a desert. The annual mean temperature is −25 °C (−13 °F), with the summer temperature able to reach about 0 °C (32 °F), and the lowest during the winter at −50 °C (−58 °F). Storms, which can occur throughout the year, can occasionally make outdoor activity impossible.

TrollSat targets satellites in a polar orbit and consists of a single radome with an 7.3-meter (24 ft) low Earth orbit antenna capable of S band and X band reception. To relay the information, TrollSat has a 4.8-meter (16 ft) and a 7.6-meter (25 ft) C band uplink to provide 45 megabit per second broadband connection to Europe and North America.
