= WorldView-3 =

Commercial Earth observation satellite

- Mission type: Earth observation
- Operator: Vantor
- COSPAR ID: 2014-048A
- SATCAT no.: 40115
- Mission duration: Planned: 7.25 years Elapsed: 11 years, 8 months, 21 days

Spacecraft properties
- Bus: BCP-5000
- Manufacturer: Ball Aerospace
- Launch mass: 2,800 kg (6,200 lb)
- Power: 3100 watts

Start of mission
- Launch date: 13 August 2014, 18:30:30 UTC
- Rocket: Atlas V 401, AV-047
- Launch site: Vandenberg SLC-3E
- Contractor: Lockheed Martin / United Launch Alliance

Orbital parameters
- Reference system: Geocentric
- Regime: Sun-synchronous
- Perigee altitude: 619 kilometers (385 mi)
- Apogee altitude: 622 kilometers (386 mi)
- Inclination: 97.97 degrees
- Period: 96.98 minutes
- Epoch: 25 January 2015, 05:15:06 UTC

WorldView-3 (WV 3) is a commercial Earth observation satellite owned by Vantor. It was launched on 13 August 2014 to become Maxar's sixth satellite in orbit, joining Ikonos which was launched in 1999, QuickBird in 2001, WorldView-1 in 2007, GeoEye-1 in 2008, and WorldView-2 in 2009. WorldView-3 provides commercially available panchromatic imagery of 0.31 m (12 in) resolution, eight-band multispectral imagery with 1.24 m (4 ft 1 in) resolution, shortwave infrared imagery at 3.7 m (12 ft 2 in) resolution, and CAVIS (Clouds, Aerosols, Vapors, Ice, and Snow) data at 30 m (98 ft) resolution.

== Launch ==
WorldView-3 was launched on 13 August 2014 from Vandenberg Air Force Base on an Atlas V flying in the 401 configuration. The launch vehicle was provided by United Launch Alliance and launch services were administered by Lockheed Martin.

== Notable uses ==
Satellite images from WorldView-3 were used in 2015 by an international team of archaeologists to discover what they then believed to be a Viking settlement on Point Rosee, Newfoundland.

From 2020, Scientists are using WorldView-3 to count and detect wildlife species, including African elephants. They used satellite imagery that required no ground presence to monitor the elephants. The team created a training dataset of 1,000 elephants and fed it to a Convolutional Neural Network (CNN) and compared the results to human performance.

On 7 October 2022 the satellite took an on orbit image of Landsat 8.

== See also ==
- 2014 in spaceflight
