= WV3 =

WV3 or WV-3 may refer to:

- Lockheed WV-3 Warning Star, a surveillance aircraft
- West Virginia's 3rd congressional district
- West Virginia Route 3
- West Virginia Route 3 (1920s)
- WorldView-3, a commercial Earth observation satellite
- WV3, a postcode district in Wolverhampton, England; see WV postcode area
