= Vantor (company) =

American space technology company

Vantor Holdings, Inc.
- Formerly: Maxar Intelligence
- Type: Private
- Industry: Geospatial software and services
- Predecessor: Maxar Technologies
- Founded: 1 October 2025; 13 months ago (corporate spin-off)
- Headquarters: Westminster, Colorado, United States
- Key people: Daniel Smoot (President and CEO)
- Revenue: 487,5 millions $ (2025)
- Owner: Advent International
- Number of employees: 1909 (2025)
- Website: vantor.com

Vantor Holdings, Inc. (doing business as Vantor, formerly Maxar Intelligence) is an American software company based in Westminster, Colorado, specializing in spatial intelligence, Earth observation, and related software and services. The company was formed after Maxar Technologies split Maxar Intelligence and Maxar Space Systems into two independent companies.

== History ==
Former logo of Maxar

=== 1992–2017: Origins as DigitalGlobe ===
What is now Vantor was started when DigitalGlobe was founded in 1992 by Walter Scott in Oakland, California.

=== 2017–2022: Acquisition by MDA and formation of Maxar ===
In 2017, DigitalGlobe was acquired by MacDonald, Dettwiler and Associates (MDA), who renamed the merged company Maxar. The headquarters of the combined entity was then established in Westminster, Colorado. The company was dual-listed on the TSX and NYSE.

In July 2020, Maxar completed its acquisition of Vricon for $140 million.

In February 2022, Maxar published several satellite images that showed a Russian military convoy during its invasion of Ukraine. Maxar's satellite data was used by Ukraine as part of its defense against Russia's invasion of its territory.

=== 2022–2023: Advent acquisition and restructuring ===
In December 2022, private equity firm Advent International acquired Maxar in a cash deal worth $6.4 billion. The acquisition was completed in May 2023.

In September 2023, Maxar was broken into two business units, Maxar Space Systems (based in California, led by CEO Chris Johnson) and Maxar Intelligence (based in Colorado, led by CEO Dan Smoot).

=== 2024: Launch of WorldView Legion ===
In 2024, Maxar Intelligence launched WorldView Legion a fleet of six satellites that expanded the ability to revisit the rapidly changing areas on Earth, enabling more near-time insights.

In October 2025, Maxar Intelligence and Maxar Space Systems rebranded to become Vantor and Lanteris respectively.

=== February – June 2025: Launch of Raptor & Sentry ===
In February 2025, the company launched Raptor, a software suite that integrates Vantor's 3D terrain data with a drone's camera to allow autonomous drone systems to navigate and extract target ground coordinates without GPS and GNSS. Four months later, in June 2025, the company launched Sentry, a geospatial monitoring system that automates the detection of physical changes on Earth's surface.

=== October 2025: Rebrand to Vantor & launch of Tensorglobe ===
In December 2025, Vantor announced working with geospatial AI startup Niantic Spatial on a air-to-ground visual positioning system for defense-related operations, especially where GPS is denied.

== Vantor Constellation ==
Vantor operates Vantor Constellation, a fleet of satellites consisting of GeoEye-1, WorldView-1, WorldView-2, WorldView-3, and WorldView Legion.

=== GeoEye-1 ===
The GeoEye-1 satellite collects images at 0.41 m (1 ft 4 in) panchromatic (black-and-white) and 1.65 m (5 ft 5 in) multispectral resolution. The satellite can collect up to 350,000 km^{2} (140,000 sq mi) of multispectral imagery per day. This is used for large-scale mapping projects. GeoEye-1 can revisit any point on Earth once every three days or sooner.

=== WorldView satellites ===
==== WorldView-1 ====
Ball Aerospace built WorldView-1. It was launched on 18 September 2007 from Vandenberg Air Force Base on a Delta II 7920-10C. Launch services were provided by United Launch Alliance (ULA). The National Geospatial-Intelligence Agency (NGA) is expected to be a major customer of WorldView-1 imagery. It included a panchromatic only camera with a 50 cm (20 in) maximum resolution.

==== WorldView-2 ====
Ball Aerospace built WorldView-2. It was launched on 8 October 2009. DigitalGlobe partnered with Boeing commercial launch services to deliver WorldView-2 into a Sun-synchronous orbit. The satellite includes a panchromatic sensor with a 46 cm (18 in) maximum resolution and a multispectral sensor of 184 cm (72 in)

==== WorldView-3 ====
Ball Aerospace built WorldView-3. It was launched on 13 August 2014. It has a maximum resolution of 25 cm (9.8 in). WorldView-3 operates at an altitude of 617 km (383 mi), where it has an average revisit time of less than once per day. Over the course of a day it is able to collect imagery of up to 680,000 km^{2} (260,000 sq mi).

Previously, DigitalGlobe was only licensed to sell images with a higher resolution than 50 cm (20 in) to the U.S. military. However, DigitalGlobe obtained permission, in June 2014, from the United States Department of Commerce, to allow the company to more widely exploit its commercial satellite imagery. The company was permitted to offer customers the highest resolution imagery available from their constellation. Additionally, the updated approvals allowed the sale of imagery to customers at up to 25 cm (9.8 in) panchromatic and 100 cm (39 in) multispectral ground sample distance (GSD), beginning six months after WorldView-3 became operational. WorldView-3 was launched aboard a United Launch Alliance Atlas V launch vehicle in the 401 configuration on 13 August 2014, at 18:30 UTC from Vandenberg Space Launch Complex 3 (SLC-3E) at Vandenberg Air Force base.

WorldView-3 is the industry's first multi-payload, super-spectral, high-resolution commercial satellite.

==== WorldView Legion ====
Built by Lanteris Space Systems (then sibling company Maxar Space Systems), WorldView Legion is Vantor's next generation of Earth observation satellites. WorldView Legion comprises six satellites planned to launch between 2024 and 2026 into a mix of Sun-synchronous and mid-latitude orbits. These satellites will replace imaging capability currently provided by WorldView-1, WorldView-2 and GeoEye-1 Earth observation satellites.

The six WorldView Legion satellites were contracted to launch on three SpaceX Falcon 9 launch vehicles.

== Controversies ==
=== BSI partnership and Pahalgam imagery orders (2025) ===
In May 2025, what was then Maxar Intelligence faced scrutiny following reports that it had received an unusual spike in orders for high-resolution satellite images of Pahalgam, a region in Jammu and Kashmir, India. Between February 2 and 22, 2025, at least 12 such orders were placed, which was double the usual number. This surge occurred shortly after Maxar partnered with Business Systems International Pvt Ltd (BSI), a Pakistani geospatial firm.

BSI is owned by Obaidullah Syed, a Pakistani-American businessman who was convicted in 2021 for illegally exporting high-performance computing equipment and software to Pakistan's nuclear research agency. Despite this conviction, BSI was listed as a Maxar partner in 2023. Following the revelations about the satellite imagery orders, Maxar removed BSI from its list of partners on its website.

Maxar stated that BSI had not placed any orders for imagery of Pahalgam or its surrounding areas in 2025 and had not accessed any such imagery from its archives. However, the timing of the imagery orders and BSI's partnership raised concerns among defense analysts and experts.

In May 2025, it was further reported that the U.S. Department of Homeland Security had earlier complained that BSI had sold satellite imagery to an arm of the Pakistani government. This raised additional concerns about the firm's access to sensitive geospatial data and its ties to Maxar Intelligence.

=== Ukraine access to satellite imagery ===
In early March 2025, the Trump administration temporarily restricted Ukraine's access to U.S. intelligence, which impacted one U.S. government program managed by Maxar Intelligence. Access was restored within a few days.
