= WorldView Legion =

Earth observation satellite system

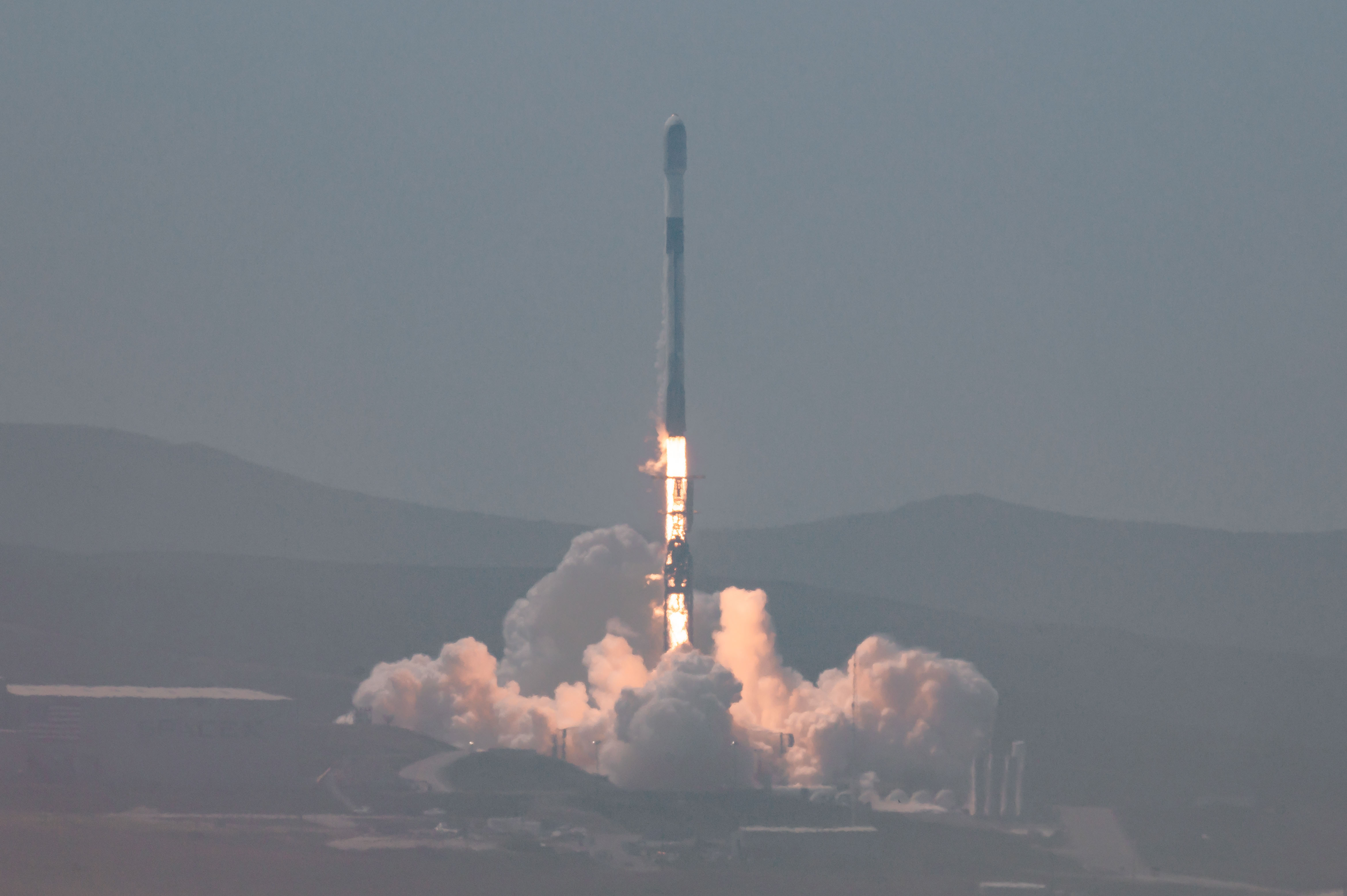
- Launch of First pair of WorldView Legion satellites on Falcon 9
- Mission type: Earth observation
- Operator: Vantor
- Mission duration: 10 years (planned)

Spacecraft properties
- Manufacturer: Lanteris Space Systems
- Launch mass: 1,700 kg (3,700 lb)

Start of mission
- Launch date: First: 2 May 2024 (WorldView Legion 1 & 2); Last: 4 February 2025 (WorldView Legion 5 & 6)
- Rocket: Falcon 9 Block 5
- Launch site: Vandenberg, SLC‑4E; Cape Canaveral, SLC‑40; Kennedy, LC-39A
- Contractor: SpaceX

Orbital parameters
- Reference system: Geocentric orbit
- Regime: Low Earth orbit

WorldView Legion is an Earth observation satellite constellation currently under development by Vantor (formerly Maxar Intelligence division of Maxar Technologies) and manufactured by Lanteris Space Systems (formerly Maxar Space Systems division of Maxar Technologies). Launch services have been contracted to SpaceX. The first two satellites were launched on 2 May 2024. WorldView Legion is owned and operated by Vantor as part of its Vantor Constellation.

== List of satellites ==
Name	SATCAT no.	COSPAR ID	Launch Date	Launch Vehicle	Launch site	Orbital apsis	Inclination	Period (min)	Status
WorldView Legion 1	59625	2024-081A	2 May 2024	Falcon 9 Block 5 (B1061.20)	Vandenberg, SLC-4E	522 - 515	97.58	95	Operational
WorldView Legion 2	59626	2024-081B	2 May 2024	Falcon 9 Block 5 (B1061.20)	Vandenberg, SLC-4E	521 - 514	97.58	94.98	Operational
WorldView Legion 3	60452	2024-146A	15 August 2024	Falcon 9 Block 5 (B1076.16)	Cape Canaveral, SLC-40	529-512	44.996	95.0	Operational
WorldView Legion 4	60453	2024-146B	15 August 2024	Falcon 9 Block 5 (B1076.16)	Cape Canaveral, SLC-40	524-512	45.039	94.99	Operational
WorldView Legion 5	62900	2025-025A	4 February 2025	Falcon 9 Block 5 (B1086.4)	Kennedy, LC-39A	524-513	45.04	95.0	Operational
WorldView Legion 6	62901	2025-025B	4 February 2025	Falcon 9 Block 5 (B1086.4)	Kennedy, LC-39A	530-507	44.99	95.0	Operational

== See also ==
- O3b mPOWER
