= WV1 =

WV1 or WV-1 may refer to:

- Lockheed WV-1 Warning Star, a surveillance aircraft
- West Virginia's 1st congressional district
- U.S. Route 50 in West Virginia, formerly West Virginia Route 1
- WorldView-1, a commercial Earth observation satellite
- WV1, a postcode district in Wolverhampton, England; see WV postcode area
