= Satellite imagery =

Images taken from an artificial satellite

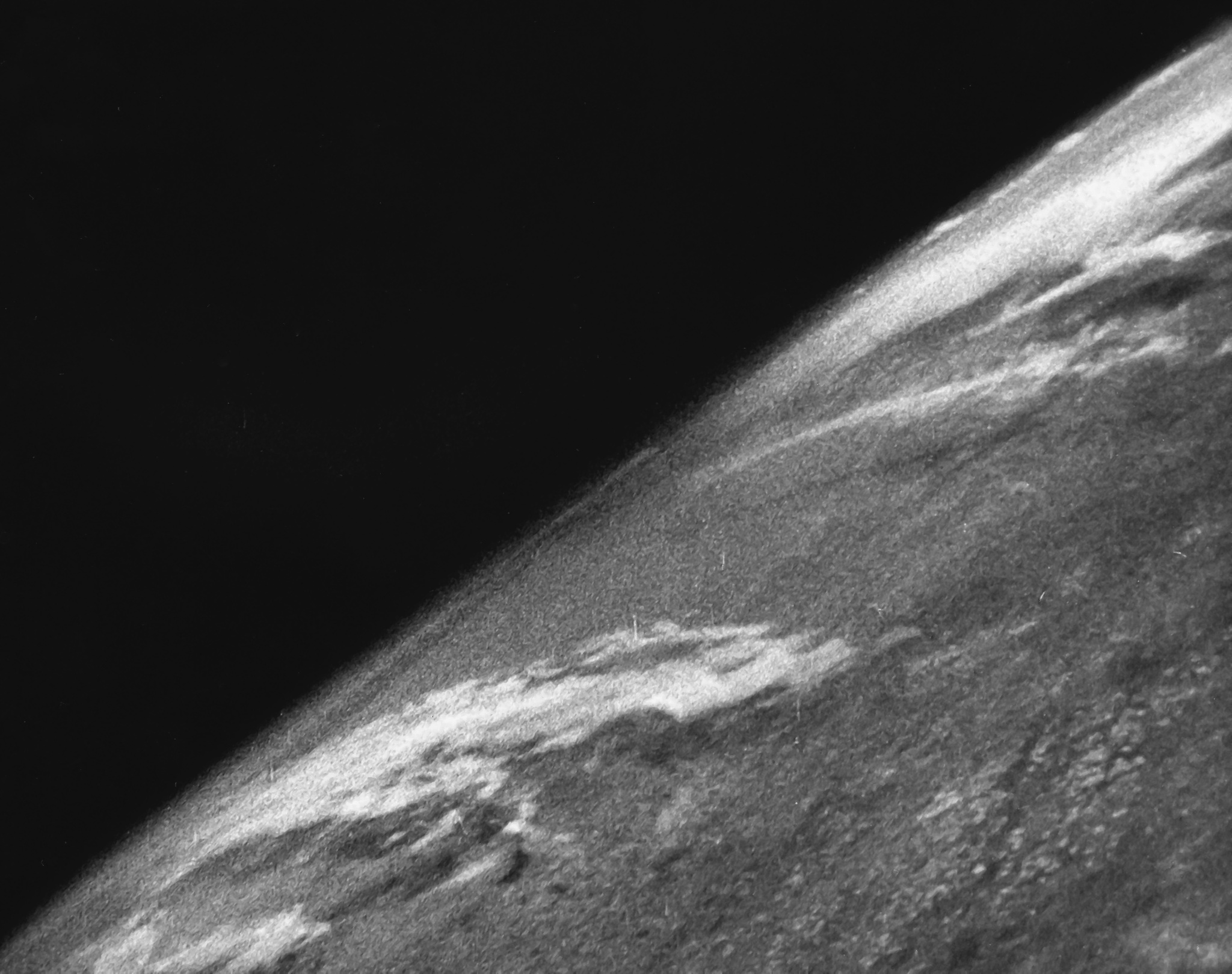
The first images from space were taken on the sub-orbital V-2 rocket flight launched by the US on October 24, 1946.

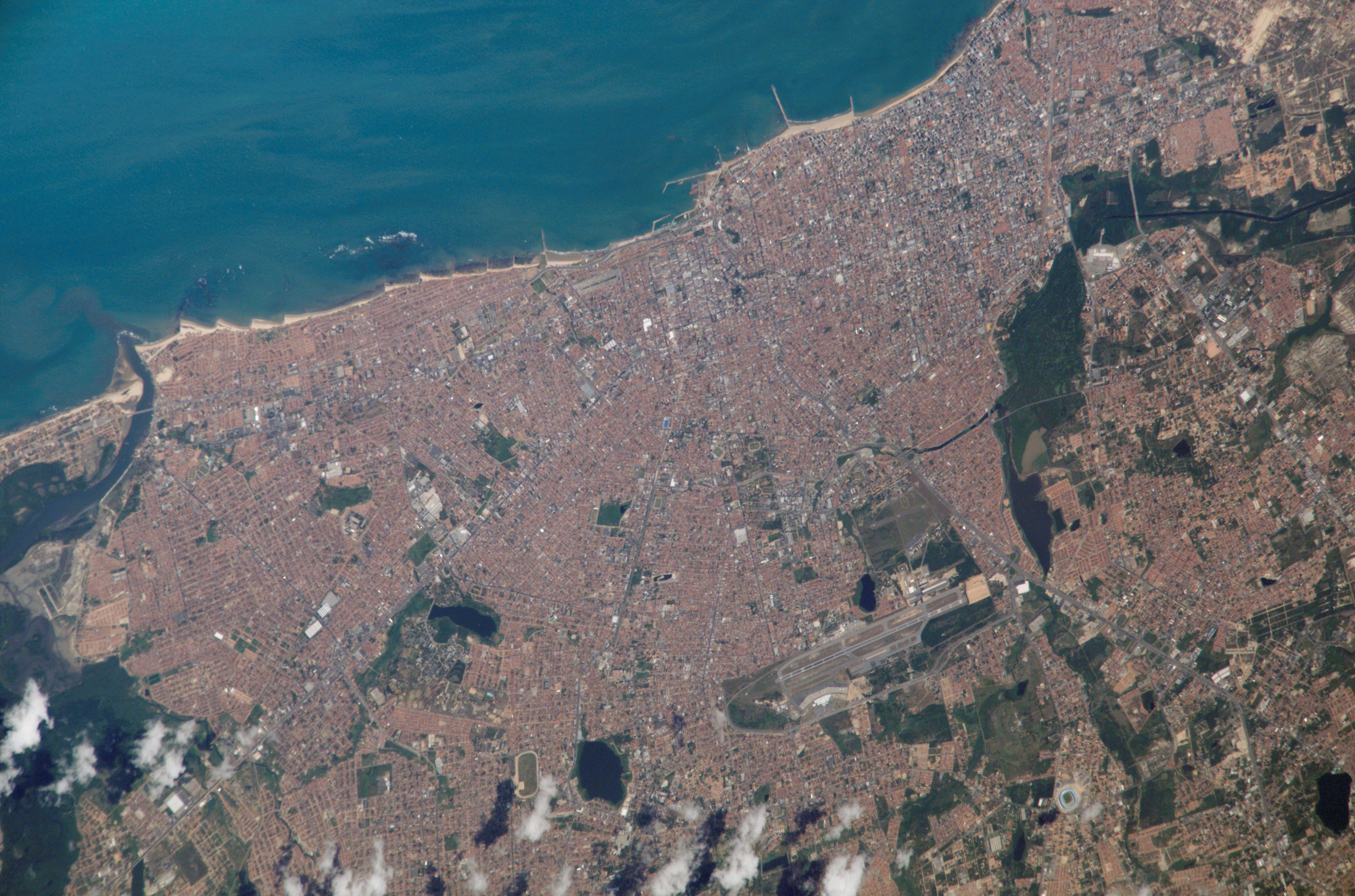
Satellite image of Fortaleza

Satellite images (also Earth observation imagery, spaceborne photography, or simply satellite photo) are images of Earth collected by imaging satellites operated by governments and businesses around the world. Satellite imaging companies sell images by licensing them to governments and businesses such as Apple Maps and Google Maps.

== History ==
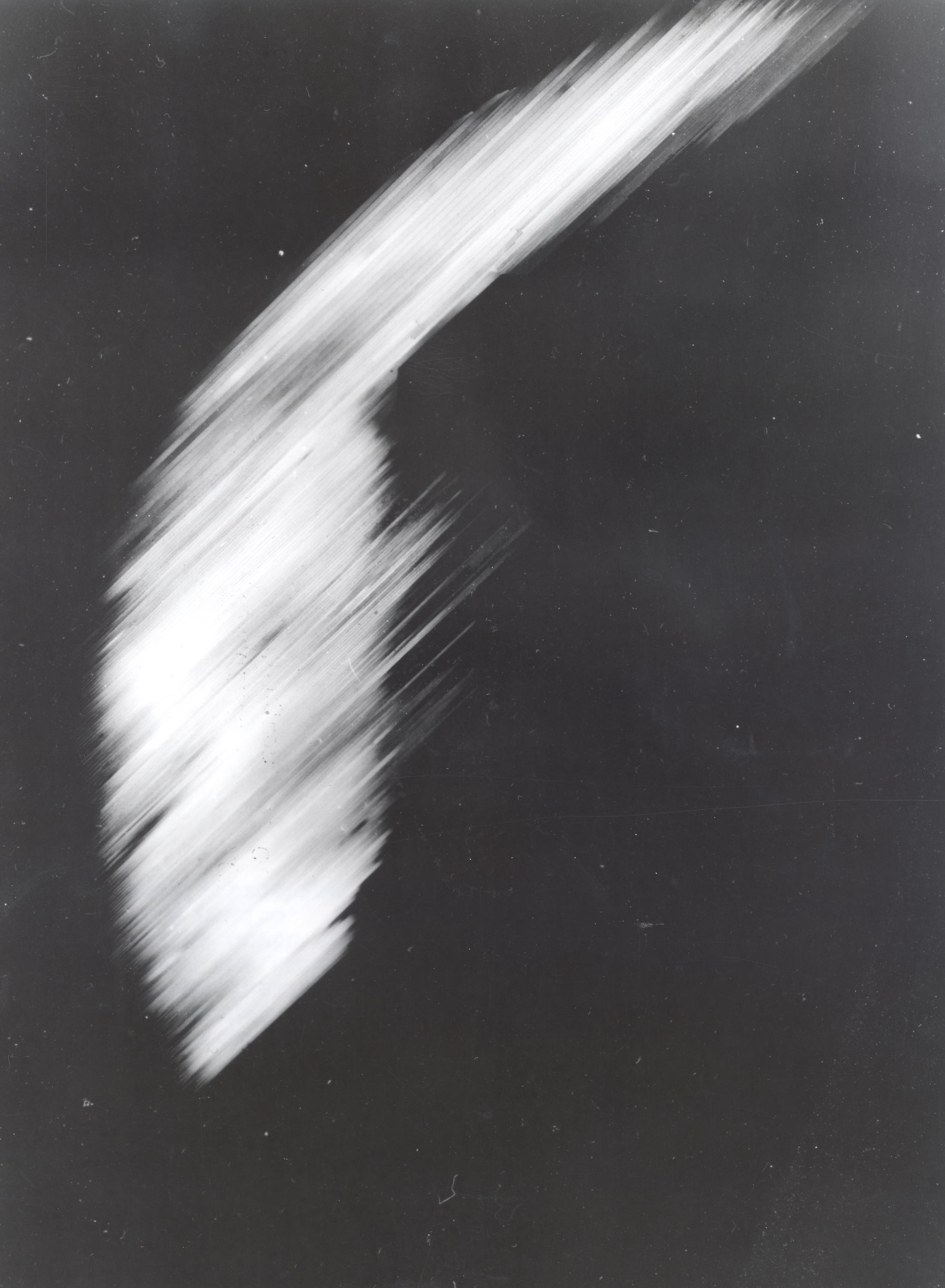
The first crude image taken by the satellite Explorer 6 shows a sunlit area of the central Pacific Ocean and its cloud cover. The photo was taken when the satellite was about 17,000 mi (27,000 km) above the surface of the Earth on August 14, 1959. At the time, the satellite was crossing Mexico.

The first images from space were taken on sub-orbital flights. The US-launched V-2 flight on October 24, 1946, took one image every 1.5 seconds. With an apogee of 65 miles (105 km), these photos were from five times higher than the previous record, the 13.7 miles (22 km) by the Explorer II balloon mission in 1935. The first satellite (orbital) photographs of Earth were made on August 14, 1959, by the U.S. Explorer 6. The first satellite photographs of the Moon might have been made on October 6, 1959, by the Soviet satellite Luna 3, on a mission to photograph the far side of the Moon. The Blue Marble photograph was taken from space in 1972, and has become very popular in the media and among the public. Also in 1972 the United States started the Landsat program, the largest program for acquisition of imagery of Earth from space. In 1977, the first real time satellite imagery was acquired by the United States' KH-11 satellite system. The most recent Landsat satellite, Landsat 9, was launched on 27 September 2021.

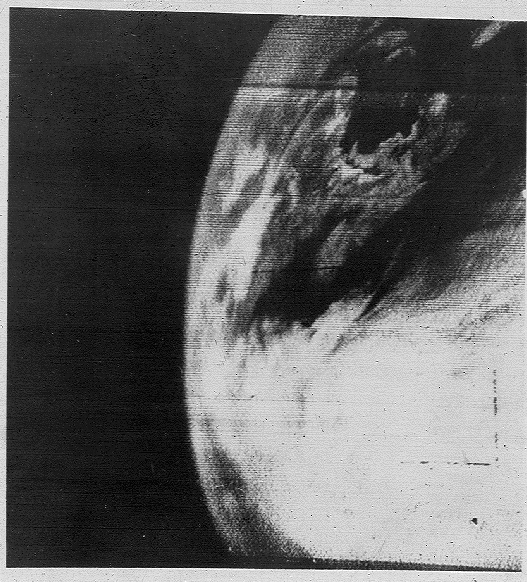
The first television image of Earth from space transmitted by the TIROS-1 weather satellite in 1960

All satellite images produced by NASA are published by NASA Earth Observatory and are freely available to the public. Several other countries have satellite imaging programs, and a collaborative European effort launched the ERS and Envisat satellites carrying various sensors. There are also private companies that provide commercial satellite imagery. In the early 21st century satellite imagery became widely available when affordable, easy to use software with access to satellite imagery databases was offered by several companies and organizations.

== Applications ==
Satellite images have numerous applications in a variety of fields.

- Weather: They guide meteorologists in forecasting patterns, tracking storms, and understanding climate change.
- Oceanography: By measuring sea temperatures and monitoring ecosystems, satellite images unlock insights into our oceans' health and global climate.
- Agriculture and fishing: Satellite data helps locate fish populations, assess crop health, and optimize resource use for a thriving agricultural and fishing industry.
- Biodiversity: Conservation efforts leverage satellite technology to map habitats, monitor ecosystem changes, and protect endangered species.
- Forestry: Satellite data empowers sustainable forestry by tracking deforestation, assessing fire risks, and managing resources effectively.
- Landscape: Analyzing land use patterns with satellite images supports urban planning and facilitates sustainable development initiatives.

Less mainstream uses include anomaly hunting, a criticized investigation technique involving the search of satellite images for unexplained phenomena.

The spectrum of satellite images includes visible light, near-infrared light, infrared light and radar, and many others. This wide range of light frequencies can provide researchers with large volumes of information.

== Usage ==
Satellite images are used in many fields of activity — agriculture, geological and hydrological research, forestry, environmental protection, territorial planning, educational, intelligence and military purposes. Such images can be made in the visible part of the spectrum, as well as in the ultraviolet, infrared and other parts of the range. There are also various terrain maps made using radar surveys.

Currently, the decryption and analysis of satellite images is increasingly performed using automated software systems such as ERDAS Imagine or ENVI. At the beginning of the development of this industry, some of the types of image enhancements commissioned by the US government were performed by contractor firms. For example, ESL Incorporated has developed one of the first two-dimensional Fourier transforms for digital image processing.

Satellite image analysis is actively used to protect the environment, for example, the "Visual satellite search for illegal landfills" method has identified more than 200 unauthorized municipal solid and household waste landfills on the territory of 5 subjects of the Russian Federation. In France, satellite imagery has been used to spot private swimming pools, limiting evasion from a tax on swimming pools.

The purchase of private imagery is also a common practice among the open-source intelligence (or OSINT) community. For example, it enables the estimation of the remaining soviet military hardware in storage that can be refitted in the context of the War in Ukraine.

== Disadvantages ==
Composite image of Earth at night, as only half of Earth is at night at any given moment

Raw satellite data typically requires processing to create useful images, including corrections such as destriping. Preprocessing, such as image destriping, is often required. Depending on the sensor used, weather conditions can affect image quality. For example, it is difficult to obtain images for areas of frequent cloud cover such as mountaintops. For such reasons, publicly available satellite image datasets are typically processed for visual or scientific commercial use by third parties.

Commercial satellite companies do not place their imagery into the public domain and do not sell their imagery; instead, one must acquire a license to use their imagery. Thus, the ability to legally make derivative works from commercial satellite imagery is diminished.

Privacy concerns have been brought up by some who wish not to have their property shown from above. Google Maps responds to such concerns in their FAQ with the following statement: "We understand your privacy concerns... The images that Google Maps displays are no different from what can be seen by anyone who flies over or drives by a specific geographic location."

== Data characteristics ==
There are five types of resolution when discussing satellite imagery in remote sensing: spatial, spectral, temporal, radiometric and geometric. Campbell (2002) defines these as follows:

- Spatial resolution is defined as the pixel size of an image representing the size of the surface area (i.e. m^{2}) being measured on the ground, determined by the sensors' instantaneous field of view (IFOV).
- Spectral resolution is defined by the wavelength interval size (i.e. the size of discrete segments of the electromagnetic spectrum) and the number of intervals that the sensor is measuring.
- Temporal resolution is defined by the amount of time (e.g. days) that passes between imagery collection periods for a given surface location.
- Radiometric resolution is defined as the ability of an imaging system to record many levels of brightness (e.g. contrast) and to the effective bit-depth of the sensor (number of grayscale levels) and is typically expressed as 8-bit (0–255), 11-bit (0–2047), 12-bit (0–4095) or 16-bit (0–65,535).
- Geometric resolution refers to the satellite sensor's ability to effectively image a portion of the Earth's surface in a single pixel and is typically expressed in terms of ground sample distance (GSD). GSD is a term containing the overall optical and systemic noise sources and is useful for comparing how well one sensor can "see" an object on the ground within a single pixel. For example, the GSD of Landsat is ≈30m, which means the smallest unit that maps to a single pixel within an image is ≈30m x 30m. The GeoEye-1 commercial satellite has a GSD of 0.41 m. This compares to a resolution of about 1.8 m obtained by the KH-4B Corona reconnaissance satellites.

The resolution of satellite images varies depending on the instrument used and the altitude of the satellite's orbit. For example, the Landsat archive offers repeated imagery at 30 meter resolution for the planet, but most of it has not been processed from the raw data. Landsat 7 has an average return period of 16 days. For many smaller areas, images with resolution as fine as 41 cm can be available.

Satellite imagery is sometimes supplemented with aerial photography, which has higher resolution, but is more expensive per square meter. Satellite imagery can be combined with vector or raster data in a GIS provided that the imagery has been spatially rectified so that it will properly align with other data sets.

== Imaging satellites ==
=== Public domain ===
Satellite imaging of the Earth surface is of sufficient public utility that many countries maintain satellite imaging programs. The United States has led the way in making these data freely available for scientific use. Some of the more popular programs are listed below, recently followed by the European Union's Sentinel constellation.

==== CORONA ====
The CORONA program was a series of American strategic reconnaissance satellites produced and operated by the Central Intelligence Agency (CIA) Directorate of Science & Technology with substantial assistance from the U.S. Air Force. The type of imagery is wet film panoramic and it used two cameras (AFT&FWD) for capturing stereoscopic imagery.

==== Landsat ====
Landsat is the oldest continuous Earth-observing satellite imaging program. Optical Landsat imagery has been collected at 30 m resolution since the early 1980s. Beginning with Landsat 5, thermal infrared imagery was also collected (at coarser spatial resolution than the optical data). The Landsat 7, Landsat 8, and Landsat 9 satellites are currently in orbit.

==== MODIS ====
MODIS has collected near-daily satellite imagery of the earth in 36 spectral bands since 2000. MODIS is on board the NASA Terra and Aqua satellites.

==== Sentinel ====
The ESA is currently developing the Sentinel constellation of satellites. Currently, 7 missions are planned, each for a different application. Sentinel-1 (SAR imaging), Sentinel-2 (decameter optical imaging for land surfaces), and Sentinel-3 (hectometer optical and thermal imaging for land and water) have already been launched.

==== ASTER ====
The ASTER is an imaging instrument onboard Terra, the flagship satellite of NASA's Earth Observing System (EOS) launched in December 1999. ASTER is a cooperative effort between NASA, Japan's Ministry of Economy, Trade and Industry (METI), and Japan Space Systems (J-spacesystems). ASTER data is used to create detailed maps of land surface temperature, reflectance, and elevation. The coordinated system of EOS satellites, including Terra, is a major component of NASA's Science Mission Directorate and the Earth Science Division. The goal of NASA Earth Science is to develop a scientific understanding of the Earth as an integrated system, its response to change, and to better predict variability and trends in climate, weather, and natural hazards.

- Land surface climatology—investigation of land surface parameters, surface temperature, etc., to understand land-surface interaction and energy and moisture fluxes
- Vegetation and ecosystem dynamics—investigations of vegetation and soil distribution and their changes to estimate biological productivity, understand land-atmosphere interactions, and detect ecosystem change
- Volcano monitoring—monitoring of eruptions and precursor events, such as gas emissions, eruption plumes, development of lava lakes, eruptive history and eruptive potential
- Hazard monitoring—observation of the extent and effects of wildfires, flooding, coastal erosion, earthquake damage, and tsunami damage
- Hydrology—understanding global energy and hydrologic processes and their relationship to global change; included is evapotranspiration from plants
- Geology and soils—the detailed composition and geomorphologic mapping of surface soils and bedrocks to study land surface processes and Earth's history
- Land surface and land cover change—monitoring desertification, deforestation, and urbanization; providing data for conservation managers to monitor protected areas, national parks, and wilderness areas

==== Meteosat ====
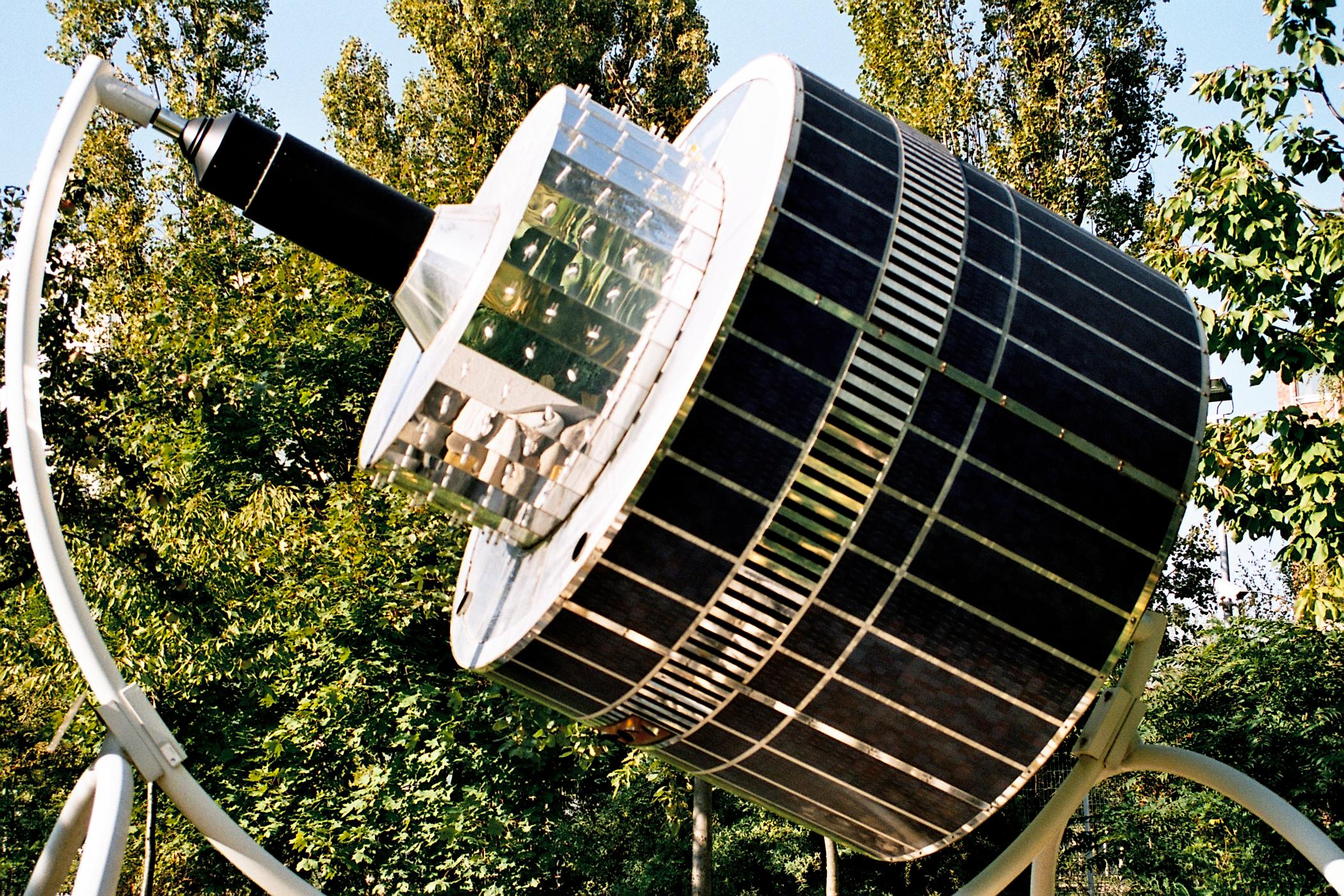
Model of a first generation Meteosat geostationary satellite

The Meteosat-2 geostationary weather satellite began operationally to supply imagery data on 16 August 1981. Eumetsat has operated the Meteosats since 1987.

- The Meteosat visible and infrared imager (MVIRI), three-channel imager: visible, infrared and water vapour; It operates on the first generation Meteosat, Meteosat-7 being still active.
- The 12-channel Spinning Enhanced Visible and Infrared Imager (SEVIRI) includes similar channels to those used by MVIRI, providing continuity in climate data over three decades; Meteosat Second Generation (MSG).
- The Flexible Combined Imager (FCI) on Meteosat Third Generation (MTG) will also include similar channels, meaning that all three generations will have provided over 60 years of climate data.

==== Himawari ====
The Himawari satellite series features advanced imaging technology and frequent data updates. Himawari-8 and Himawari-9 have become indispensable tools for weather forecasting, disaster management, and climate research, benefiting not only Japan but the entire Asia-Pacific region.

- Frequent Updates: These satellites can provide full-disk images of the Asia-Pacific region every 10 minutes, and even more frequently (every 2.5 minutes) for specific areas (Japan), ensuring that meteorologists have up-to-date information for accurate weather forecasting.
- Spectral Bands:
  - Visible Light Bands (0.47 μm, 0.51 μm, 0.64 μm): These bands are used for daytime cloud, land, and ocean surface observations. They provide high-resolution images that are critical for tracking cloud movements and assessing weather conditions.
  - Near-Infrared Bands (0.86 μm, 1.6 μm, 2.3 μm, 6.9 μm, 7.3 μm, 8.6 μm, 9.6 μm, 11.2 μm, 13.3 μm): These bands help in distinguishing between different types of clouds, vegetation, and surface features. They are particularly useful for detecting fog, ice, and snow.
  - Infrared Bands (3.9 μm, 6.2 μm, 10.4 μm, 12.4 μm): The remaining bands cover the thermal infrared spectrum. These bands are crucial for measuring cloud-top temperatures, sea surface temperatures, and atmospheric water vapor content. They enable continuous monitoring of weather patterns.
- Advanced Imaging Technology: Himawari-8 and Himawari-9 are equipped with the Advanced Himawari Imager (AHI), which provides high-resolution images of the Earth. The AHI can capture images in 16 different spectral bands, allowing for detailed observation of weather patterns, clouds, and environmental phenomena.

=== Private domain ===
Several satellites are built and maintained by private companies, as follows.

==== GeoEye ====
GeoEye's GeoEye-1 satellite was launched on September 6, 2008. The GeoEye-1 satellite has high resolution imaging system and is able to collect images with a ground resolution of 0.41 meters (16 inches) in panchromatic or black and white mode. It collects multispectral or color imagery at 1.65-meter resolution or about 64 inches.

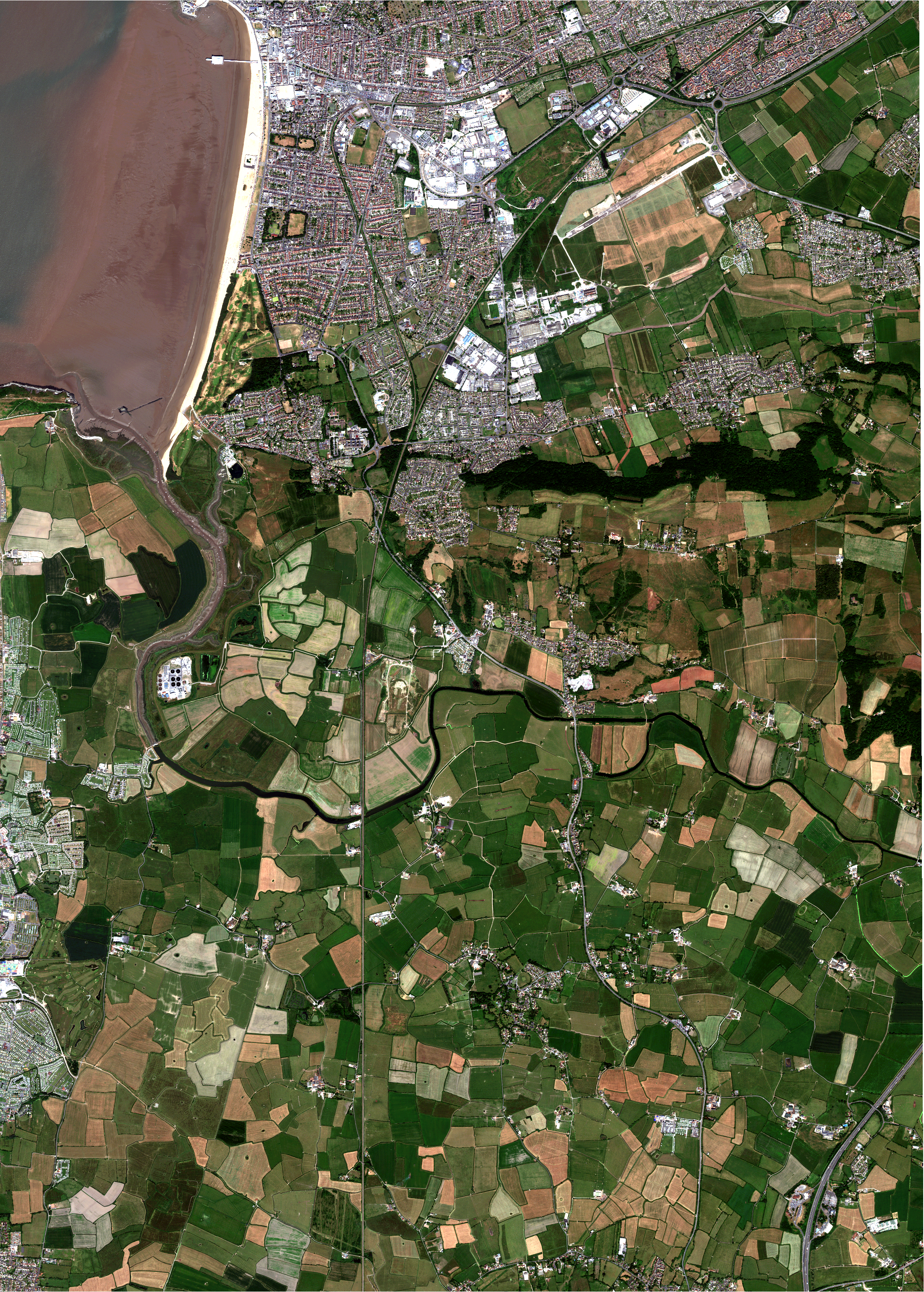
WorldView-2 image of Weston-super-Mare

==== Maxar ====
Maxar's WorldView-2 satellite provides high resolution commercial satellite imagery with 0.46 m spatial resolution (panchromatic only). The 0.46 meters resolution of WorldView-2's panchromatic images allows the satellite to distinguish between objects on the ground that are at least 46 cm apart. Similarly Maxar's QuickBird satellite provides 0.6 meter resolution (at nadir) panchromatic images.

Maxar's WorldView-3 satellite provides high resolution commercial satellite imagery with 0.31 m spatial resolution. WVIII also carries a short wave infrared sensor and an atmospheric sensor.

==== Airbus Intelligence ====
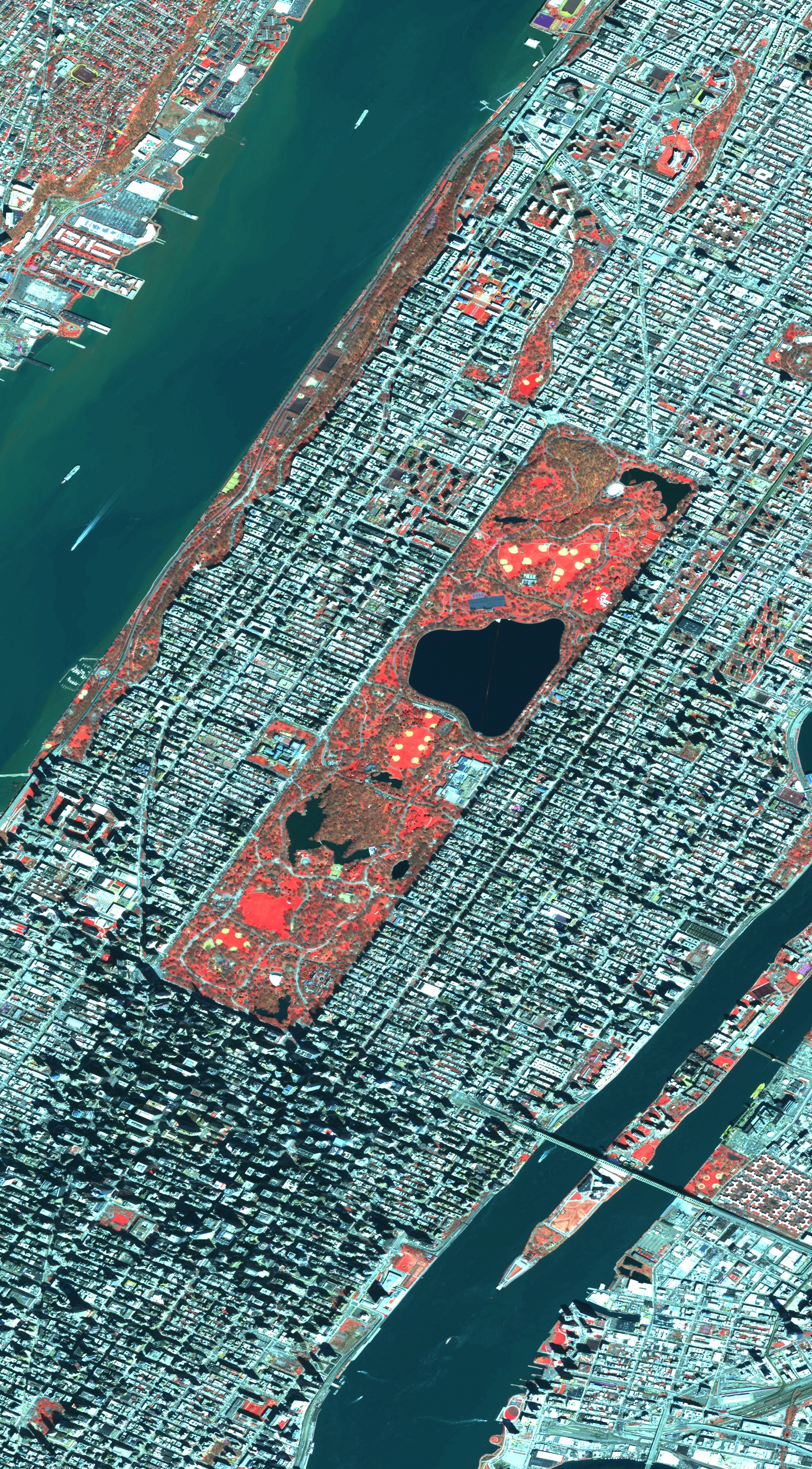
Pleiades image of Central Park in New York City

Pléiades constellation is composed of two very-high-resolution (50 centimeters pan & 2.1 meter spectral) optical Earth-imaging satellites. Pléiades-HR 1A and Pléiades-HR 1B provide the coverage of Earth's surface with a repeat cycle of 26 days. Designed as a dual civil/military system, Pléiades will meet the space imagery requirements of European defense as well as civil and commercial needs. Pléiades Neo is the advanced optical constellation, with four identical 30-cm resolution satellites with fast reactivity.

==== Spot Image ====
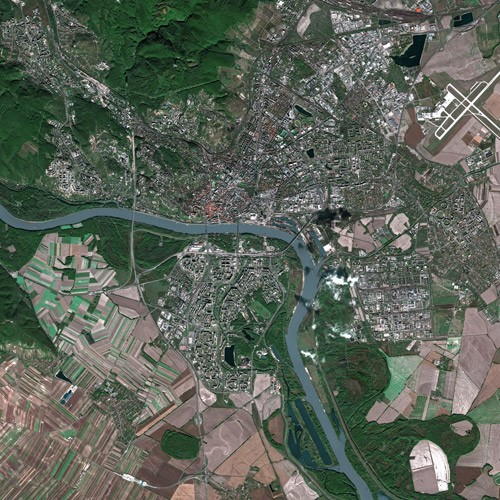
SPOT image of Bratislava

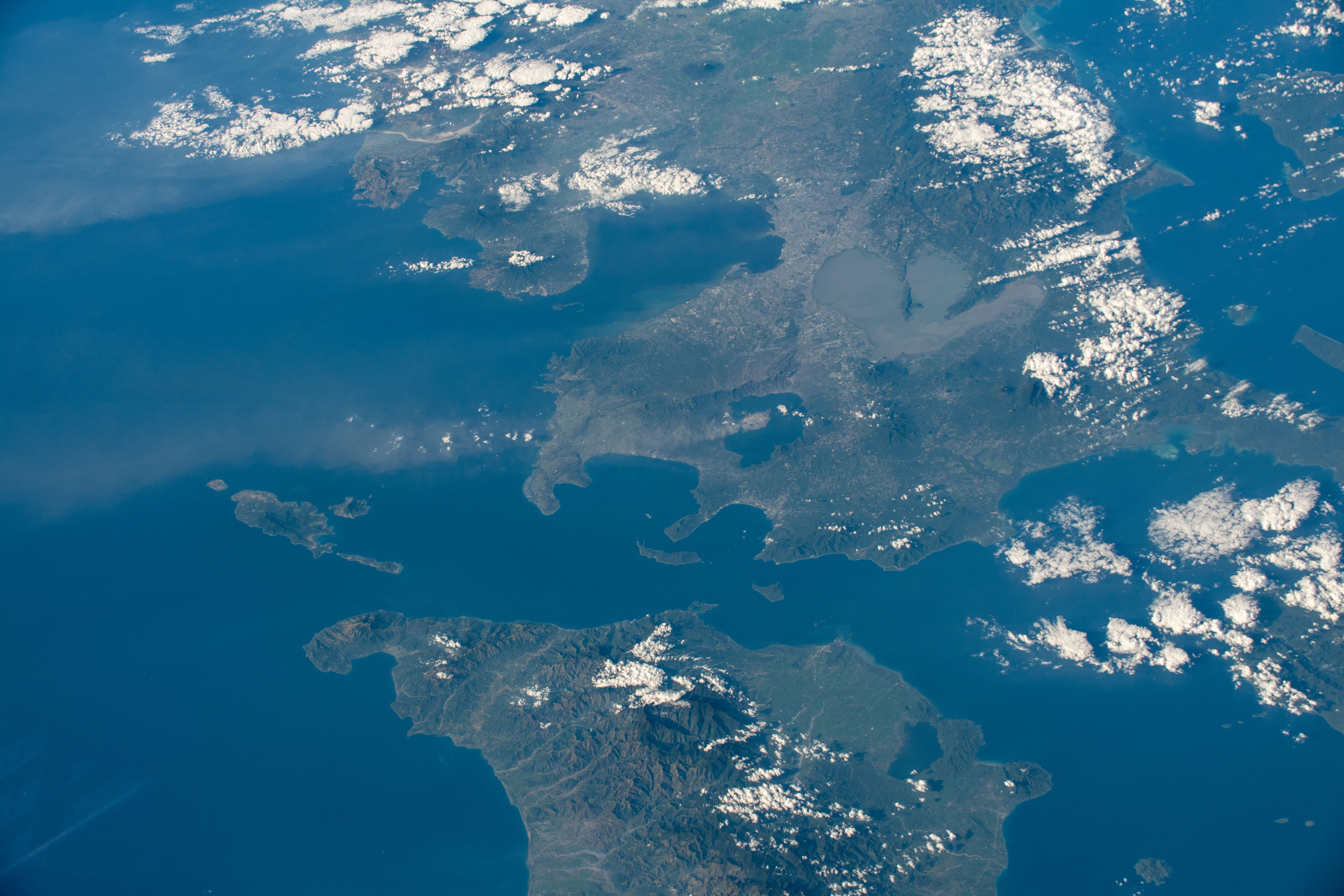
Satellite view of Southern Luzon taken by the ISS

The 3 SPOT satellites in orbit (Spot 5, 6, 7) provide very high resolution images – 1.5 m for Panchromatic channel, 6m for Multi-spectral (R,G,B,NIR). Spot Image also distributes multiresolution data from other optical satellites, in particular from Formosat-2 (Taiwan) and Kompsat-2 (South Korea) and from radar satellites (TerraSar-X, ERS, Envisat, Radarsat). Spot Image is also the exclusive distributor of data from the high resolution Pleiades satellites with a resolution of 0.50 meter or about 20 inches. The launches occurred in 2011 and 2012, respectively. The company also offers infrastructures for receiving and processing, as well as added value options.

==== Planet Labs ====
Planet Labs operates three satellite imagery constellations, RapidEye, Dove and SkySat.

In 2015, Planet acquired BlackBridge, and its constellation of five RapidEye satellites, launched in August 2008. The RapidEye constellation contains identical multispectral sensors which are equally calibrated. Therefore, an image from one satellite will be equivalent to an image from any of the other four, allowing for a large amount of imagery to be collected (4 million km^{2} per day), and daily revisit to an area. Each travel on the same orbital plane at 630 km, and deliver images in 5 meter pixel size. RapidEye satellite imagery is especially suited for agricultural, environmental, cartographic and disaster management applications. The company not only offers their imagery, but consults their customers to create services and solutions based on analysis of this imagery. The RapidEye constellation was retired by Planet in April 2020.

Planet's Dove satellites are CubeSats that weigh 4 kilograms (8.8 lb), 10 by 10 by 30 centimetres (3.9 in × 3.9 in × 11.8 in) in length, width and height, orbit at a height of about 400 kilometres (250 mi) and provide imagery with a resolution of 3–5 metres (9.8–16.4 ft) and are used for environmental, humanitarian, and business applications.

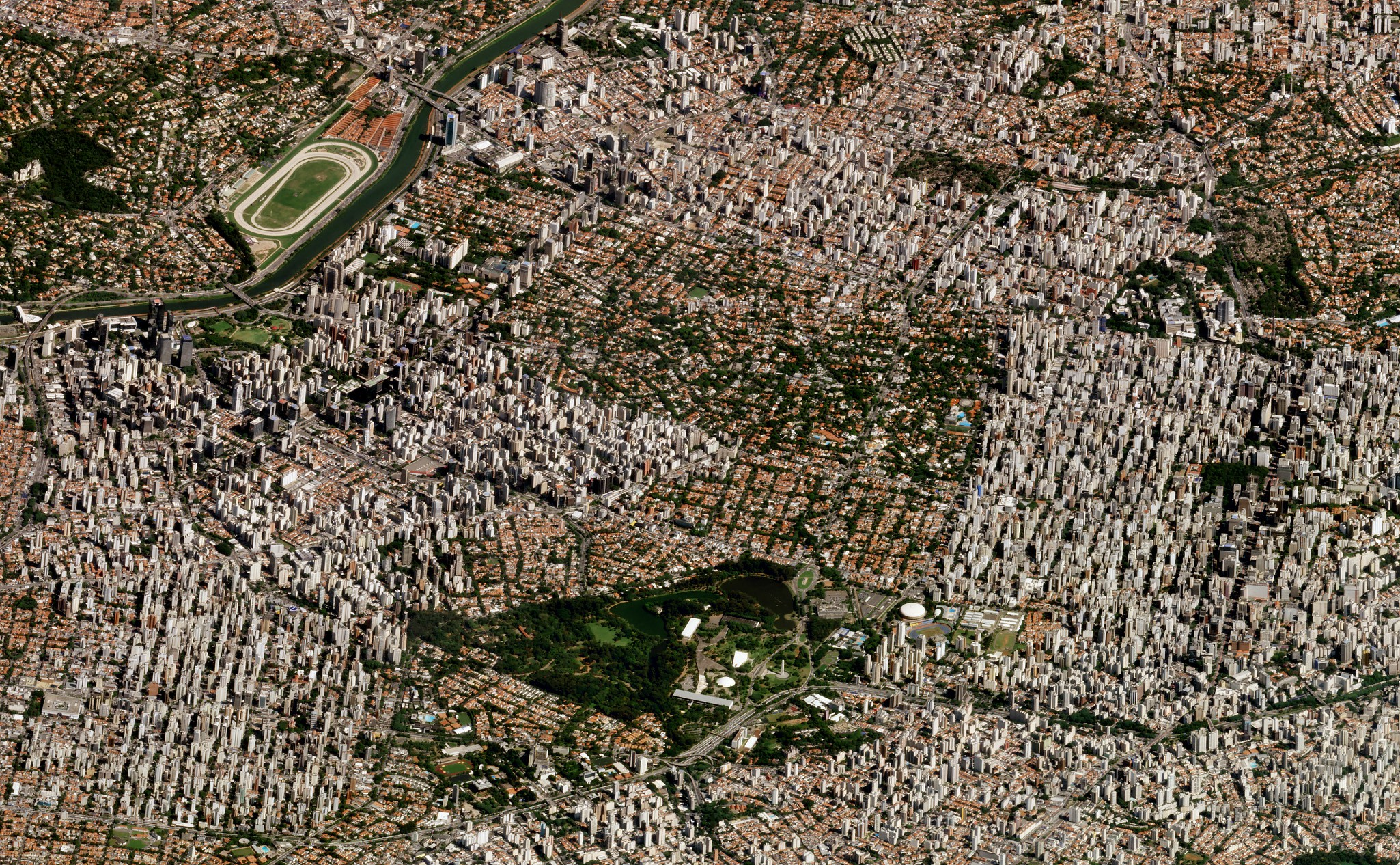
SkySat image of São Paulo, the largest city in Brazil

SkySat is a constellation of sub-metre resolution Earth observation satellites that provide imagery, high-definition video and analytics services. Planet acquired the satellites with their purchase of Terra Bella (formerly Skybox Imaging), a Mountain View, California-based company founded in 2009 by Dan Berkenstock, Julian Mann, John Fenwick, and Ching-Yu Hu, from Google in 2017.

The SkySat satellites are based on using inexpensive automotive grade electronics and fast commercially available processors, but scaled up to approximately the size of a minifridge. The satellites are approximately 80 centimetres (31 in) long, compared to approximately 30 centimetres (12 in) for a 3U CubeSat, and weigh 100 kilograms (220 lb).

==== ImageSat International ====
Earth Resource Observation Satellites, better known as "EROS" satellites, are lightweight, low earth orbiting, high-resolution satellites designed for fast maneuvering between imaging targets. In the commercial high-resolution satellite market, EROS is the smallest very high resolution satellite; it is very agile and thus enables very high performances. The satellites are deployed in a circular Sun-synchronous near polar orbit at an altitude of 510 km (± 40 km). EROS satellites imagery applications are primarily for intelligence, homeland security and national development purposes but also employed in a wide range of civilian applications, including: mapping, border control, infrastructure planning, agricultural monitoring, environmental monitoring, disaster response, training and simulations, etc.

EROS A – a high resolution satellite with 1.9–1.2m resolution panchromatic was launched on December 5, 2000.

EROS B – the second generation of Very High Resolution satellites with 70 cm resolution panchromatic, was launched on April 25, 2006.

EROS C2 – the third generation of Very High Resolution satellites with 30 cm. resolution panchromatic, was launched in 2021.

EROS C3 – the third generation of Very High Resolution satellites with 30 cm. resolution panchromatic and multispectral, was launched in 2023.

==== China Siwei ====
GaoJing-1 / SuperView-1 (01, 02, 03, 04) is a commercial constellation of Chinese remote sensing satellites controlled by China Siwei Surveying and Mapping Technology Co. Ltd. The four satellites operate from an altitude of 530 km and are phased 90° from each other on the same orbit, providing 0.5m panchromatic resolution and 2m multispectral resolution on a swath of 12 km.

== See also ==
- Aerial photography
- Earth observation satellite
- Moderate-resolution imaging spectroradiometer
- Reconnaissance satellite
- Remote sensing
- Shuttle Radar Topography Mission
- Timeline of first images of Earth from space
- Virtual globe
  - NASA World Wind
- Weather satellite
