= Vricon =

American geospatial-intelligence data and software provider

- Promotional image
- Industry: Remote sensing and mapping
- Founded: 2015
- Headquarters: McLean, Virginia
- Area served: Worldwide
- Key people: Manne Anliot (Vice-President, Head of Marketing and Sales)
- Products: 3D surface model software
- Website: vricon.com

Vricon was an American geospatial-intelligence data and software provider. It was a joint venture between Saab and DigitalGlobe and was headquartered in McLean, Virginia.

Vricon's three-dimensional visualization uses stereophotogrammetry with hundreds of images, typically from commercial satellite imagery. Vricon used automated 3D image processing algorithms to produce 3D data for government and commercial clients.

On July 1, 2020, Vricon was acquired by Maxar Technologies for approximately US$140 million.
