= HJW =

HJW may refer to:

- HJW theorem, used in quantum information theory
- HJW GeoSpatial, Inc., predecessor to GlobeXplorer, American spatial data company
- HJW Foundation, organization by Hansjörg Wyss, Swiss businessman
