= WV2 =

WV2 or WV-2 may refer to:

- Lockheed WV-2 Warning Star, a surveillance aircraft
- West Virginia's 2nd congressional district
- West Virginia Route 2
- WorldView-2, a commercial Earth observation satellite
- WV2, a postcode district in Wolverhampton, England; see WV postcode area
- Nickname of boxer Wilfredo Vázquez, Jr.
