= GlobeXplorer =

- Industry: Websites; Aerial Photography; Geographic Information Systems (GIS)
- Founded: 1999; 27 years ago
- Founder: Rob Shanks; Michael Fisher; Chris Nicholas; Paul Smith
- Defunct: 2007
- Fate: Acquired by DigitalGlobe
- Headquarters: Walnut Creek, California
- Key people: Rob Shanks, Co-founder/President; Paul Smith, Co-founder/COO; Majid Azad, CFO; Chris Nicholas, Co-founder/System architect
- Products: ImageAtlas; ImageBuilder; ImageConnect

GlobeXplorer was an online spatial data company that compiled and distributed aerial photos, satellite imagery, and map data from their online spatial archives. GlobeXplorer has been credited as the first company to establish a business around compiling and distributing online aerial and satellite imagery. In 2007, the company was acquired by DigitalGlobe.

GlobeXplorer's imagery and property data was licensed to many online information websites. GlobeXplorer obtained its content through online distribution relationships with about 30 of the world's top acquirers of aerial, satellite, and property data. GlobeXplorer's primary products were the ImageAtlas ecommerce storefront and ImageBuilder web developer toolkit. It also provided ImageConnect extensions and web services for GIS and Computer-aided design.

GlobeXplorer's defensible core competence was its ability to meter custom profiles of content for consumers and pay royalties to providers based on 512x512 "standard image units" (SIU). This was accomplished through content hosting, delivery via APIs and application plugins, and building a custom billing system modeled around TELCO call rating and inter-bank settlement accounting. Beyond imagery, the billing system also supported metering of vector data and usage of floating license tokens for programs such as Arc/INFO, PCI and ERDAS.

== History ==
GlobeXplorer was founded in 1999 by Rob Shanks, Michael Fisher, Chris Nicholas, and Paul Smith (former executives at HJW GeoSpatial, Inc.) through partnerships with Sun Microsystems, NASA, and Oracle Corporation. It grew from a NASA EOCAP project of HJW's to place ready-made orthophotography online, and an internal project of Sun Microsystems and Oracle to counter the Microsoft "Terraserver" technology demonstration. The EOCAP project concluded with the creation of an 'earth imagery' searchable website in 1998. HJW was acquired by Harrods of London, who provided financial backing to spin out the online effort into GlobeXplorer, which launched its public website in September 2000. An article entitled "Now you, too, can be a Spy" appeared on the front page of the Wall Street Journal's business section, and traffic reached nearly 4 million page views the first day.

In 2000, the company unveiled the largest Earth imagery archive.

In 2005, GlobeXplorer acquired AirPhotoUSA, a provider of aerial imagery.

In January 2007, Stewart Title sold the company to DigitalGlobe.

== See also ==
- Oracle Grid Engine
