= Kongsberg Satellite Services =

Norwegian satellite ground station services company

Coordinates: 69.66196°N 18.94225°E

Kongsberg Satellite Services AS
- Company type: Private
- Industry: Space
- Founded: December 21, 2001; 24 years ago
- Headquarters: Tromsø, Norway
- Area served: Global
- Products: Ground station services
- Revenue: ▲NOK 236 693 000 (before taxes, 2017)
- Operating income: ▲NOK 752 139 000 (2017)
- Number of employees: 358 (2023)
- Parent: Kongsberg Gruppen Norwegian Space Centre
- Website: ksat.no

Kongsberg Satellite Services AS (KSAT) is a Norwegian-based company. KSAT has the most extensive ground station network globally, and the world's largest ground station for support of polar orbiting satellites located at 78° North - Svalbard, Norway. They are a provider of ground network services and maritime monitoring services

KSAT headquarters is in Tromsø, Norway, with sales offices in Oslo, Stockholm and Denver, Colorado. KSAT AS is part of Kongsberg Defence & Aerospace of Norwegian Kongsberg Gruppen, an international technology group, that supplies high-technology to merchant marine, defence, aerospace, offshore oil and gas industries, and renewable and utilities industries.

KSAT was established in 2002, though its roots may be traced back to 1967 when the Tromsø ground station was inaugurated.

According to the Norwegian Communications Authority, KSAT is permitted to service Chinese state-owned defense contractor Chang Guang Satellite Technology Corporation.

== Sites ==
The company's global ground network consists of more than 200 antennas at 23 sites worldwide, this provides optimized locations for satellites in polar, inclined and equatorial orbits. Everything is remotely monitored and controlled and from the HQ's network operations center in Tromsø.

- Troll, Antarctic
- Cordoba, Argentina (partner station)
- Tolhuin, Argentina (partner station)
- Inuvik, Northwest Territories, Canada
- Punta Arenas, Chile
- Nemea, Greece
- Nuuk, Greenland
- Bangalore, India (partner station)
- Tokyo, Japan
- Mauritius
- Awarua, New Zealand
- Svalbard, Norway
- Tromsø, Norway
- Vardø, Norway
- Panama
- Azores, Portugal (partner station)
- Singapore
- Hartebeesthoek, South Africa
- Puertollano, Spain
- Dubai, United Arab Emirates
- Fairbanks, Alaska, United States
- Los Angeles, California, United States
- Hawaii, United States

== Ownership ==
KSAT is owned equally (50/50) by Space Norway AS (50%), and Kongsberg Defence & Aerospace AS (50%).
