= Maxar Technologies =

American space technology company (2017–2025)

Maxar Technologies Inc.
- Type: Private
- Industry: Geospatial solutions and services, engineering services, communications and imaging satellites
- Founded: 5 October 2017; 8 years ago
- Defunct: October 2025
- Fate: Split
- Successor: Lanteris Space Systems; Vantor
- Headquarters: Westminster, Colorado, United States
- Key people: Daniel Smoot (President and CEO); Arvind Srinivasan (CTO) Mike Mohn (CFO); Anat Gan Eden (CHRO)
- Revenue: ▼US$1.61 billion (2022)
- Operating income: ▼US$11 million (2022)
- Net income: ▼US$−150 million (2022)
- Total assets: ▲US$4.61 billion (2022)
- Total equity: ▼US$1.39 billion (2022)
- Owner: Advent International
- Number of employees: 2,600 (December 2024)

Maxar Technologies Inc., was an American space technology company, specializing in geospatial intelligence, Earth observation, and on-orbit satellite servicing, satellite products, and related services. DigitalGlobe and MDA Holdings Company merged to become Maxar Technologies on October 5, 2017.

Maxar Technologies was the parent holding company of Maxar Space Systems, headquartered in Palo Alto, California, US; and Maxar Intelligence, headquartered in Westminster, Colorado, US. From 2017 to 2023, it was dual-listed on the Toronto Stock Exchange and New York Stock Exchange as MAXR.

In October 2025, Maxar Intelligence and Maxar Space Systems rebranded to become Vantor and Lanteris respectively.

== History ==
Maxar Technologies was created in 2017 from the purchase of DigitalGlobe by MacDonald, Dettwiler and Associates (MDA), who renamed the company Maxar. The headquarters of the combined entity was then established in Westminster, Colorado. The company was dual-listed on the TSX and NYSE.

In Q3 2018 Maxar's revenue and adjusted profit missed estimates due to a decline in its satellite manufacturing segment oriented towards geosynchronous Earth orbit communications, which led to a plunge in the stock price. The situation was compounded in January 2019 with the loss of their relatively new WorldView-4 satellite, and the market capitalization fell from $3 to $0.3 billion in half a year, and with an insurance payment only covering a fifth of WV-4 total launch cost the company had to restructure its debts in April 2019.

In May 2019, the company was selected as the provider of the power and propulsion element for the Lunar Gateway developed by NASA.

On December 30, 2019, the company announced that it had entered into a definitive agreement to sell MDA's assets to a consortium of financial sponsors led by Northern Private Capital for CA$1 billion (US$765 million). The sale includes all of MDA's Canadian businesses, encompassing ground stations, radar satellite products, robotics, defense, and satellite components, representing approximately 1,900 employees.

On April 8, 2020, the sale of MDA to NPC officially closed. The divesting of its Canadian MDA portion returned MDA to a separate operating company. The newly formed privately held Canadian company was named MDA Ltd., which later listed on the Toronto Stock Exchange.

In 2022, Maxar published several satellite images that showed a Russian military convoy during its invasion of Ukraine.

In May 2023, Maxar was acquired by private equity firm Advent International, in an all-cash transaction worth $6.4 billion.

In September 2023, Maxar was broken into two business units, Maxar Space Systems (based in California, led by CEO Chris Johnson) and Maxar Intelligence (based in Colorado, led by CEO Dan Smoot).

In early March 2025, the Trump administration temporarily restricted Ukraine's access to U.S. intelligence, which impacted one U.S. government program managed by Maxar Intelligence.

=== Controversy over BSI Partnership and Pahalgam Imagery Orders (2025) ===
In May 2025, Maxar Intelligence faced scrutiny following reports that it had received an unusual spike in orders for high-resolution satellite images of Pahalgam, a region in Jammu and Kashmir, India. Between February 2 and 22, 2025, at least 12 such orders were placed, which was double the usual number. This surge occurred shortly after Maxar partnered with Business Systems International Pvt Ltd (BSI), a Pakistani geospatial firm.

BSI is owned by Obaidullah Syed, a Pakistani-American businessman who was convicted in 2021 for illegally exporting high-performance computing equipment and software to Pakistan's nuclear research agency. Despite this conviction, BSI was listed as a Maxar partner in 2023. Following the revelations about the satellite imagery orders, Maxar removed BSI from its list of partners on its website.

Maxar stated that BSI had not placed any orders for imagery of Pahalgam or its surrounding areas in 2025 and had not accessed any such imagery from its archives. However, the timing of the imagery orders and BSI's partnership raised concerns among defense analysts and experts.

In May 2025, it was further reported that the U.S. Department of Homeland Security had earlier complained that BSI had sold satellite imagery to an arm of the Pakistani government. This raised additional concerns about the firm’s access to sensitive geospatial data and its ties to Maxar Intelligence.

=== Timeline ===
- 2017: MDA completed its acquisition of DigitalGlobe, the combined company became Maxar Technologies, dual-listed on NYSE and TSX. MDA will then be a subsidiary of US-based Maxar by 2019.
- 2018: Announced acquisition of Neptec for $32 million.
- 2019: Completed U.S. domestication, changing the parent company's incorporation from Canada to Delaware, USA.
- 2020: MDA is sold to a consortium of Canadian investors led by Northern Private Capital. This sale includes the Houston-based MDA US Systems, LLC.
- 2020: Completed its acquisition of Vricon for $140 million. Vricon is a global leader in satellite-derived 3D data for defense and intelligence markets
- 2022: Maxar to be taken private through an acquisition led by Advent International, in a cash deal worth $6.4 billion. The acquisition completed in May 2023.
- 2024: Maxar Intelligence launches WorldView Legion a fleet of six high-performing satellites that dramatically expanded the ability to revisit the most rapidly changing areas on Earth, enabling more near-time insights.
- 2025: Maxar shuts down access to satellite images in Ukraine following request from the Trump administration.
- 2025: Came under scrutiny for Pahalgam imagery orders and prior partnership with BSI, a Pakistani firm flagged by U.S. Homeland Security for selling satellite data to Pakistan’s government.
- 2025: Maxar Intelligence becomes Vantor. Maxar Space Systems becomes Lanteris.

== See also ==
- ICEYE
- Intermap Technologies
- NV5 Geospatial Solutions
- Planet Labs
- Satellogic
