= WorldView-1 =

Commercial Earth observation satellite

- Mission type: Earth observation
- Operator: Vantor
- COSPAR ID: 2007-041A
- SATCAT no.: 32060
- Website: Vantor Constellation WorldView-1
- Mission duration: Planned: 7.25 years Elapsed: 18 years, 20 days

Spacecraft properties
- Bus: BCP-5000
- Manufacturer: Ball Aerospace
- Launch mass: 2,500 kilograms (5,500 lb)
- Dimensions: 3.6 × 2.5 m (11.8 × 8.2 ft)
- Power: 3200 watts

Start of mission
- Launch date: 18 September 2007, 18:35:00 UTC
- Rocket: Delta II 7920-10C, D-326
- Launch site: Vandenberg SLC-2W
- Contractor: Boeing / United Launch Alliance

Orbital parameters
- Reference system: Geocentric
- Regime: LEO
- Semi-major axis: 6,872.02 km (4,270.08 mi)
- Eccentricity: 0.0005028
- Perigee altitude: 497 km (309 mi)
- Apogee altitude: 504 km (313 mi)
- Inclination: 97.87 degrees
- Period: 94.49 minutes
- RAAN: 113.04 degrees
- Argument of perigee: 99.35 degrees
- Mean anomaly: 15.24 degrees
- Mean motion: 15.24
- Epoch: 25 January 2015, 02:44:46 UTC

WorldView-1 (WV 1) is a commercial Earth observation satellite owned by Vantor (formerly DigitalGlobe). WorldView-1 was launched on 18 September 2007, followed later by the WorldView-2 in 2009. First imagery from WorldView-1 was available in October 2007, prior to the six-year anniversary of the launch of QuickBird, DigitalGlobe's previous satellite.

WorldView-1 was partially financed through an agreement with the National Geospatial-Intelligence Agency (NGA). Some of the imagery captured by WorldView-1 for the NGA is not available to the general public. However, WorldView-1 freed capacity on DigitalGlobe's QuickBird satellite to meet the growing commercial demand for multi-spectral geospatial imagery.

== Design ==
Ball Aerospace built the WorldView-1 satellite bus and camera using an off-axis camera design identical to Quickbird, with the instrument's focal plane being supplied by ITT Exelis. The camera is a panchromatic imaging system featuring half-meter resolution imagery. With an average revisit time of 1.7 days, WorldView-1 is capable of collecting up to 750,000 square kilometers (290,000 sq mi) per day of half-meter imagery.

== Launch ==
- Launch Date: 18 September 2007
- Launch Time: 18:35 UTC (2:35 p.m. EDT)
- Launch Vehicle: Delta II 7920-10C, s/n D-326
- Launch Site: Space Launch Complex 2 West, Vandenberg Air Force Base, California

== See also ==
- 2007 in spaceflight
