= WorldView-2 =

Commercial Earth observation satellite

- Mission type: Earth observation
- Operator: Vantor
- COSPAR ID: 2009-055A
- SATCAT no.: 35946
- Website: Vantor Constellation WorldView-2
- Mission duration: Planned: 7.25 years Elapsed: 17 years, 1 month, 6 days

Spacecraft properties
- Bus: BCP-5000
- Manufacturer: Ball Aerospace
- Launch mass: 2,800 kg (6,200 lb)
- Power: 3200 watts

Start of mission
- Launch date: 8 October 2009, 18:51:01 UTC
- Rocket: Delta II 7920-10C, D-345
- Launch site: Vandenberg SLC-2W
- Contractor: Boeing / United Launch Alliance

Orbital parameters
- Reference system: Geocentric
- Regime: Sun-synchronous
- Perigee altitude: 772 kilometers (480 mi)
- Apogee altitude: 773 kilometers (480 mi)
- Inclination: 98.40 degrees
- Period: 100.16 minutes
- Epoch: 25 January 2015, 04:29:44 UTC

WorldView-2 (WV 2) is a commercial Earth observation satellite owned by Vantor (formerly DigitalGlobe). WorldView-2 provides commercially available panchromatic imagery of 0.46 m (18 in) resolution, and eight-band multispectral imagery with 1.84 m (72 in) resolution.

It was launched 8 October 2009 to become DigitalGlobe's third satellite in orbit, joining WorldView-1 which was launched in 2007 and QuickBird which was launched in 2001. It takes a new photograph of any place on Earth every 1.1 days.

== Design ==
Ball Aerospace built the spacecraft, which includes an optical telescope that can image objects 18 in (460 mm) in diameter.

== Launch ==
WorldView-2 was launched 8 October 2009 from Vandenberg Air Force Base on a Delta II flying in the 7920 configuration. The launch vehicle was provided by the United Launch Alliance and launch services were administered by Boeing.

== History ==
On 19 July 2016, the Joint Space Operations Center reported a debris causing event of at least 9 observable pieces, after which DigitalGlobe demonstrated the satellite to still be functional by releasing an image of downtown Oakland, California.

== See also ==
- 2009 in spaceflight
