= GeoEye-1 =

Commercial Earth observation satellite

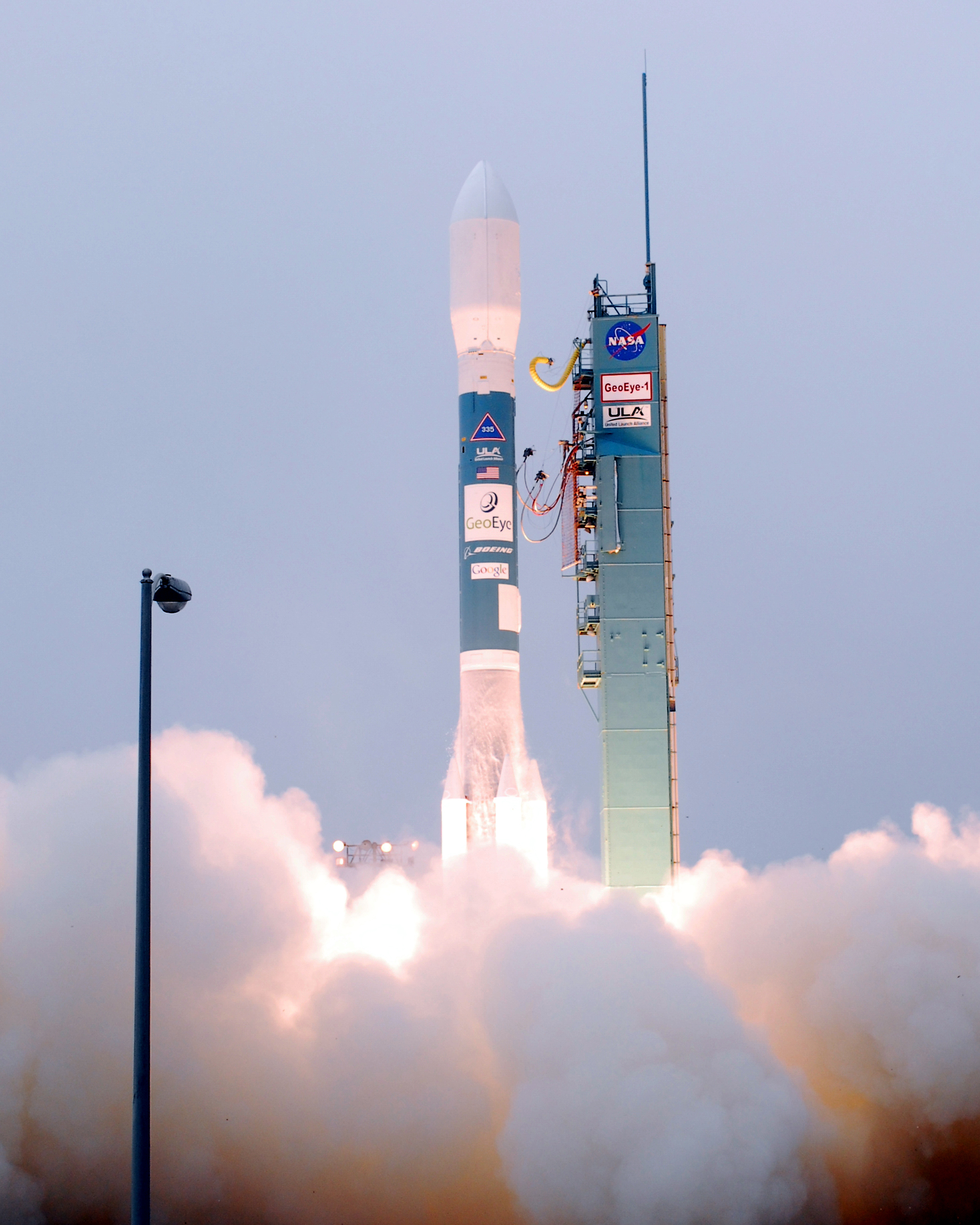
- Launch of Delta II rocket carrying GeoEye-1
- Names: OrbView-5
- Mission type: Earth observation
- Operator: Vantor (formerly GeoEye)
- COSPAR ID: 2008-042A
- SATCAT no.: 33331
- Mission duration: Planned: 7 years Elapsed: 18 years, 1 month, 27 days

Spacecraft properties
- Bus: SA-200HP
- Manufacturer: General Dynamics
- Launch mass: 1,955 kg (4,310 lb)
- Payload mass: 452 kg (996 lb)
- Dimensions: 4.35 × 2.7 m (14.3 × 8.9 ft) (arrays stowed)
- Power: 3,862 watts

Start of mission
- Launch date: 6 September 2008, 18:50:57 UTC
- Rocket: Delta II 7420-10, D-335
- Launch site: Vandenberg SLC-2W
- Contractor: Boeing / United Launch Alliance

Orbital parameters
- Reference system: Geocentric
- Regime: Sun-synchronous
- Semi-major axis: 7,057 km (4,385 mi)
- Eccentricity: 0.000879
- Perigee altitude: 673 km (418 mi)
- Apogee altitude: 685 km (426 mi)
- Inclination: 98.12 degrees
- Period: 98.34 minutes
- RAAN: 347.09 degrees
- Argument of perigee: 221.37 degrees
- Epoch: 30 September 2018, 16:31:21 UTC

Main telescope
- Diameter: 1.1 m (3.6 ft)
- Focal length: 13.3 m (44 ft)
- Resolution: Panchromatic: 41 cm (16 in); Multispectral: 165 cm (65 in)

Transponders
- Bandwidth: X band: 150 or 740 Mbps

GeoEye-1 is a high-resolution Earth observation satellite owned by Vantor (formerly DigitalGlobe), launched on September 6, 2008. The satellite was acquired in the 2013 purchase of GeoEye.

== History ==
On 1 December 2004, General Dynamics C4 Systems announced it had been awarded a contract worth approximately US$209 million to build the OrbView-5 satellite. Its sensor is designed by the ITT Exelis.

The satellite, now known as GeoEye-1, was originally scheduled for launch in April 2008 but lost its 30-day launch slot to a U.S. government mission which had itself been delayed. It was rescheduled for launch 22 August 2008 from Vandenberg Air Force Base aboard a Delta II launch vehicle. The launch was postponed to 4 September 2008, due to unavailability of the Big Crow telemetry-relay aircraft. It was delayed again to 6 September because Hurricane Hanna interfered with its launch crews.

The launch took place successfully on 6 September 2008 at 18:50:57 UTC. The GeoEye-1 satellite separated successfully from its Delta II launch vehicle at 19:49 UTC, 58 minutes and 56 seconds after launch.

== Specifications and operation ==
GeoEye-1 provides 0.41 m (16 in) panchromatic and 1.65 m (5.4 ft) multispectral imagery at nadir in 15.2 km (9.4 mi) swaths. The spacecraft is in a Sun-synchronous orbit at an altitude of 681 km (423 mi) and an inclination of 98 degrees, with a 10:30 a.m. equator crossing time. GeoEye-1 can image up to 60 degrees off nadir. It is operated out of Dulles, Virginia.

At the time of its launch, GeoEye-1 was the world's highest resolution commercial Earth-imaging satellite. GeoEye-1 was manufactured in Gilbert, Arizona, by General Dynamics and the first image was returned on 7 October of Kutztown University of Pennsylvania in Kutztown, Pennsylvania.

Google, which had its logo on the side of the rocket, has exclusive online mapping use of its data. While GeoEye-1 is capable of imagery with details the size of 41 centimeters per pixel (16 in/px), that resolution was only available to the U.S. government. Google has access to details of 50 cm per pixel (20 in/px). Prior maximum commercial imagery was 60 cm (24 in).

The National Geospatial-Intelligence Agency and Google paid a combined US$502 million for the satellite and upgrades to GeoEye's four ground stations.

=== 2009 anomaly ===
In December 2009 GeoEye announced it had suspended imagery collections by GeoEye-1 for a few days, citing an irregularity in the downlink antenna. "The irregularity appears to limit the range of movement of GeoEye-1's downlink antenna, which may in turn affect GeoEye-1's ability to image and downlink simultaneously," GeoEye said at a press conference. However, the satellite continued with normal operations shortly thereafter, though with diminished simultaneous imaging-and-downlink capability for non-U.S. clients.

== See also ==
- 2008 in spaceflight
