= QuickBird =

Satellite

QuickBird was a high-resolution commercial Earth observation satellite, owned by DigitalGlobe, launched in 2001 and reentered after orbit decay in 2015. QuickBird used Ball Aerospace's Global Imaging System 2000 (BGIS 2000). The satellite collected panchromatic (black and white) imagery at 61 centimeter resolution and multispectral imagery at 2.44- (at 450 km) to 1.63-meter (at 300 km) resolution, as orbit altitude is lowered during the end of mission life.

At this resolution, detail such as buildings and other infrastructure are easily visible. However, this resolution is insufficient for working with smaller objects such as a license plate on a car. The imagery can be imported into remote sensing image processing software, as well as into GIS packages for analysis.

Contractors included Ball Aerospace & Technologies, Kodak and Fokker Space. Original plans called for a constellation of three QuickBird satellites scheduled to be in orbit by 2008. In the end, two QuickBird satellites, QuickBird I and II, made it to launch pad. However, only QuickBird II made it successfully into orbit (QuickBird I suffered launch failure). Thus QuickBird II satellite is usually referred to simply as QuickBird, and by the name QuickBird is usually meant the satellite QuickBird II.

Prior to QuickBird I and II, DigitalGlobe launched the EarlyBird 1 successfully in 1997 but the satellite lost communications after only four days in orbit due to power system failure.

== QuickBird I ==
The first QuickBird, QuickBird I (or QuickBird 1, QB 1, COSPAR 2000-074A) was launched 20 November 2000, by EarthWatch from the Plesetsk Cosmodrome in Russia by a Kosmos-3M rocket. QB-1 failed to reach planned orbit due to launch vehicle failure and was declared a failure. The satellite re-entered next day still attached to the upper stage of the rocket. The QB-1 satellite was in construction similar to QuickBird 2 satellite (described above and below in this article), which became later known simply as QuickBird.

== QuickBird II ==
QuickBird II (also QuickBird-2 or Quickbird 2, QB-2, COSPAR 2001-047A) or as it was later known, simply QuickBird, was launched for DigitalGlobe October 18, 2001 from the Vandenberg Air Force Base, California, aboard a Boeing Delta II rocket. The satellite was initially expected to collect at 1 meter resolution but after a license was granted in 2000 by the U.S. Department of Commerce / NASA, DigitalGlobe was able launch the QuickBird II with 0.61 meter panchromatic and 2.4 meter multispectral (previously planned 4 meter) resolution.

== Mission Extension ==
In April 2011, the Quickbird satellite was raised from an orbit of 450 km (280 mi) to 482 km (300 mi). The process, started in March 2011, extended the satellite's life. Before the operation the useful life of Quickbird was expected to drop off around mid-2012 but after the successful mission, the new orbit prolonged the satellite life into early 2015.

== Decaying ==
The last picture was acquired on December 17, 2014. On January 27, 2015, QuickBird re-entered Earth's atmosphere.

== Specifications ==
Sensors

- 60 cm (24 in) (1.37 μrad) panchromatic at nadir
- 2.4 m (7 ft 10 in) (5.47 μrad) multispectral at nadir
  - MS Channels: blue (450–520 nm), green (520–600 nm), red (630–690 nm), near-IR (760–890 nm)

Swath width and area size

- Nominal swath width: 18 km at nadir
- Accessible ground swath: 544 km centered on the satellite ground track (to 30° off nadir)
- Area of interest
  - Single area: 18 km by 18 km
  - Strip: 18 km by 360 km

Orbit

- Altitude (original): 450 km – 97.2 degree Sun synchronous circular orbit
- Altitude (post-orbit modification): 482 km – 98 degree sun synchronous inclination
- Revisit frequency: 1 to 3.5 days depending on latitude at 60 cm resolution
- Viewing angle: Agile spacecraft, in-track and cross-track pointing
- Period 94.2 minutes

On-board storage

- 128 Gigabit capacity (approximately 57 single area images)

Spacecraft

- Fueled for 7 years, design life 5 years
- 2100 lb (950 kg), 3.04 m (10 ft) in length

== Launch ==
- Launch Date: October 18, 2001
- Launch Window: 1851–1906 GMT (1451–1506 EDT)
- Launch Vehicle: Delta II
- Launch Site: SLC-2W, Vandenberg Air Force Base, California
- USAF Designation: Quickbird 2.

== See also ==
- 2000 in spaceflight
- 2001 in spaceflight
- DigitalGlobe
