= DigitalGlobe =

American space imagery company

- Type: Subsidiary
- Industry: Satellite imagery
- Founded: January 1992
- Founder: Walter Scott
- Defunct: 5 October 2017
- Successor: Maxar Technologies
- Headquarters: Westminster, Colorado, U.S.
- Area served: Worldwide
- Key people: Jeff Culwell Sr. (vice president, operations)
- Products: High-resolution satellite imagery and geospatial solutions
- Revenue: US$ 654.6 million (2014)
- Operating income: US$ 25.4 million (2014)
- Net income: US$ 18.5 million (2014)
- Total assets: US$ 3,095.2 million (2014)
- Number of employees: 1,200 (2014)
- Parent: Advent International
- Website: www.digitalglobe.com

DigitalGlobe (formerly EarthWatch) was an American commercial vendor of space imagery and geospatial content, and operator of civilian remote sensing spacecraft. The company went public on the New York Stock Exchange on 14 May 2009, selling 14.7 million shares at US$19.00 each to raise US$279 million in capital. On 5 October 2017, Maxar Technologies completed its acquisition of DigitalGlobe.

The company's "WorldView" satellites should not be confused with the unrelated WorldView company (a stratospheric balloon operator).

== Origins ==
WorldView Imaging Corporation was founded in January 1992 in Oakland, California in anticipation of the 1992 Land Remote Sensing Policy Act (enacted in October 1992), which permitted private companies to enter the satellite imaging business. Its founder was Walter Scott, who was joined by co-founder and CEO Doug Gerull in late 1992. In 1993, the company received the first high resolution commercial remote sensing satellite license issued under the 1992 Act. The company was initially funded with private financing from Silicon Valley sources and interested corporations in North America, Europe and Japan. Dr. Scott was head of the Lawrence Livermore Laboratories "Brilliant Pebbles" and "Brilliant Eyes" projects which were part of the Strategic Defense Initiative. Doug Gerull was the executive in charge of the Mapping Sciences division at the Intergraph Corporation. The company's first remote sensing license from the United States Department of Commerce allowed it to build a commercial remote sensing satellite capable of collecting images with 3 m (9.8 ft) resolution.

In 1995, the company became EarthWatch Incorporated, merging WorldView with Ball Aerospace & Technologies Corp.'s commercial remote sensing operations.

In September 2001, EarthWatch became DigitalGlobe.

In 2007, DigitalGlobe acquired online imagery provider GlobeXplorer to extend its imagery distribution capabilities via online APIs and web services.

In 2011, DigitalGlobe was inducted into the Space Foundation's Space Technology Hall of Fame for its role in advancing commercial Earth-imaging satellites.

In 2013, DigitalGlobe purchased GeoEye.

In February 2017, MacDonald, Dettwiler and Associates (MDA) and DigitalGlobe reached an agreement for MDA to acquire DigitalGlobe for US$2.4 billion. As of May 2017, DigitalGlobe's image catalog contains 100 petabytes worth of data, and grows by 100 terabytes each day. As of 5 October 2017, MDA has announced it has completed its acquisition of DigitalGlobe. On 5 October 2017, DigitalGlobe and MDA Holdings Company merged to become Maxar Technologies

On 30 December 2019, the company announced that it had entered into a definitive agreement to sell MDA to a consortium of financial sponsors led by Northern Private Capital for CAD$1 billion (US$765 million). The sale included all of MDA's Canadian businesses, encompassing ground stations, radar satellite products, robotics, defense, and satellite components, representing approximately 1,900 employees.

On 8 April 2020, the sale of the MDA assets to NPC officially closed. The newly formed privately held Canadian company was named MDA.

== Satellites ==
=== EarlyBird-1 ===
EarlyBird-1 (COSPAR 1997-085A) commercial Earth imaging satellite was built for EarthWatch Inc. by CTA Space Systems (later part of Orbital Sciences Corporation) and launched on 24 December 1997, from the Svobodny Cosmodrome by a Start-1 launch vehicle. It had a mass of 317 kg (699 lb) and a design life of 3 years (fuel reserves for 5 years). It included a panchromatic (black-and-white) camera with a 3 m (9.8 ft) resolution and a multispectral (color) camera with a 15 m (49 ft) resolution. The imaging sensor was derived from a 1998-cancelled NASA satellite called Clark (SSTI 2). EarlyBird-1 was the first commercial satellite to be launched from the Svobodny Cosmodrome. Although the launch was successful, the satellite lost communications after only four days in orbit due to power system failure.

=== IKONOS ===
IKONOS was launched 24 September 1999. It was the world's first high-resolution commercial imaging satellite to collect panchromatic (black-and-white) images with 0.8 m (2 ft 7 in) resolution and multispectral (color) imagery with 3.2 m (10 ft) resolution. On 31 March 2015, IKONOS was officially decommissioned after more than doubling her mission design life, spending 5,680 days in orbit and making 83,131 trips around the Earth.

=== QuickBird ===
QuickBird, launched on 18 October 2001, was DigitalGlobe's primary satellite until early 2015. It was built by Ball Aerospace, and launched by a Boeing Delta II. It is in a 450 km (280 mi) altitude, 98° inclination Sun-synchronous orbit. An earlier launch attempt resulted in the loss of QuickBird-1; after this, the second satellite of the series, QuickBird-2 was launched and it is this satellite that became known simply as QuickBird (as no other QuickBird satellites were launched). It included a panchromatic camera with a 60 cm (24 in) resolution and a multispectral camera with a 2.4 m (7 ft 10 in) resolution. On 27 January 2015, QuickBird was de-orbited, exceeding her initial life expectancy by nearly 300%.

=== GeoEye-1 ===
The GeoEye-1 satellite collects images at 0.41 m (1 ft 4 in) panchromatic (black-and-white) and 1.65 m (5 ft 5 in) multispectral resolution. The satellite can collect up to 350,000 km^{2} (140,000 sq mi) of multispectral imagery per day. This is used for large-scale mapping projects. GeoEye-1 can revisit any point on Earth once every three days or sooner.

=== WorldView satellite system ===
==== WorldView-1 ====
Ball Aerospace built WorldView-1. It was launched on 18 September 2007 from Vandenberg Air Force Base on a Delta II 7920-10C. Launch services were provided by United Launch Alliance (ULA). The National Geospatial-Intelligence Agency (NGA) is expected to be a major customer of WorldView-1 imagery. It included a panchromatic only camera with a 50 cm (20 in) maximum resolution.

==== WorldView-2 ====
Ball Aerospace built WorldView-2. It was launched on 8 October 2009. DigitalGlobe partnered with Boeing commercial launch services to deliver WorldView-2 into a Sun-synchronous orbit. The satellite includes a panchromatic sensor with a 46 cm (18 in) maximum resolution and a multispectral sensor of 184 cm (72 in)

==== WorldView-3 ====
Ball Aerospace built WorldView-3. It was launched on 13 August 2014. It has a maximum resolution of 25 cm (9.8 in). WorldView-3 operates at an altitude of 617 km (383 mi), where it has an average revisit time of less than once per day. Over the course of a day it is able to collect imagery of up to 680,000 km^{2} (260,000 sq mi).

Previously, DigitalGlobe was only licensed to sell images with a higher resolution than 50 cm (20 in) to the U.S. military. However, DigitalGlobe obtained permission, in June 2014, from the United States Department of Commerce, to allow the company to more widely exploit its commercial satellite imagery. The company was permitted to offer customers the highest resolution imagery available from their constellation. Additionally, the updated approvals allowed the sale of imagery to customers at up to 25 cm (9.8 in) panchromatic and 100 cm (39 in) multispectral ground sample distance (GSD), beginning six months after WorldView-3 became operational. WorldView-3 was launched aboard a United Launch Alliance Atlas V launch vehicle in the 401 configuration on 13 August 2014, at 18:30 UTC from Vandenberg Space Launch Complex 3 (SLC-3E) at Vandenberg Air Force base.

WorldView-3 is the industry's first multi-payload, super-spectral, high-resolution commercial satellite.

==== WorldView-4 ====
The WorldView-4 satellite was designed to provide panchromatic images at a highest resolution of 31 cm (12 in), and multispectral images at 124 cm (49 in). Originally named GeoEye-2, the spacecraft was designed and built by Lockheed Martin, while the camera payload was provided by ITT Corporation.

Following the merger of GeoEye and DigitalGlobe, in 2013, DigitalGlobe announced that GeoEye-2 would be completed as a ground spare to be launched if or when required. It was renamed to WorldView-4 in July 2014, when the company announced that it would be launched in Fall 2016. It was launched on 11 November 2016.

In January 2019, Maxar reported the failure of a control moment gyroscope on the satellite, rendering it inoperable.

== Customers and competitors ==
DigitalGlobe's customers range from urban planners, to conservation organizations like the Amazon Conservation Team, to the U.S. federal agencies, including NASA and the United States Department of Defense's National Geospatial-Intelligence Agency (NGA). Much of Google Earth and Google Maps high resolution-imagery is provided by DigitalGlobe.

DigitalGlobe's main competitor was Airbus with Spot and Pleiades satellites.

== See also ==
- Photogrammetry
- Remote sensing
- Satellite Sentinel Project
- Tomnod, a DigitalGlobe project that uses crowdsourcing to identify objects and places in satellite images.
