= List of Delta II launches =

Delta II

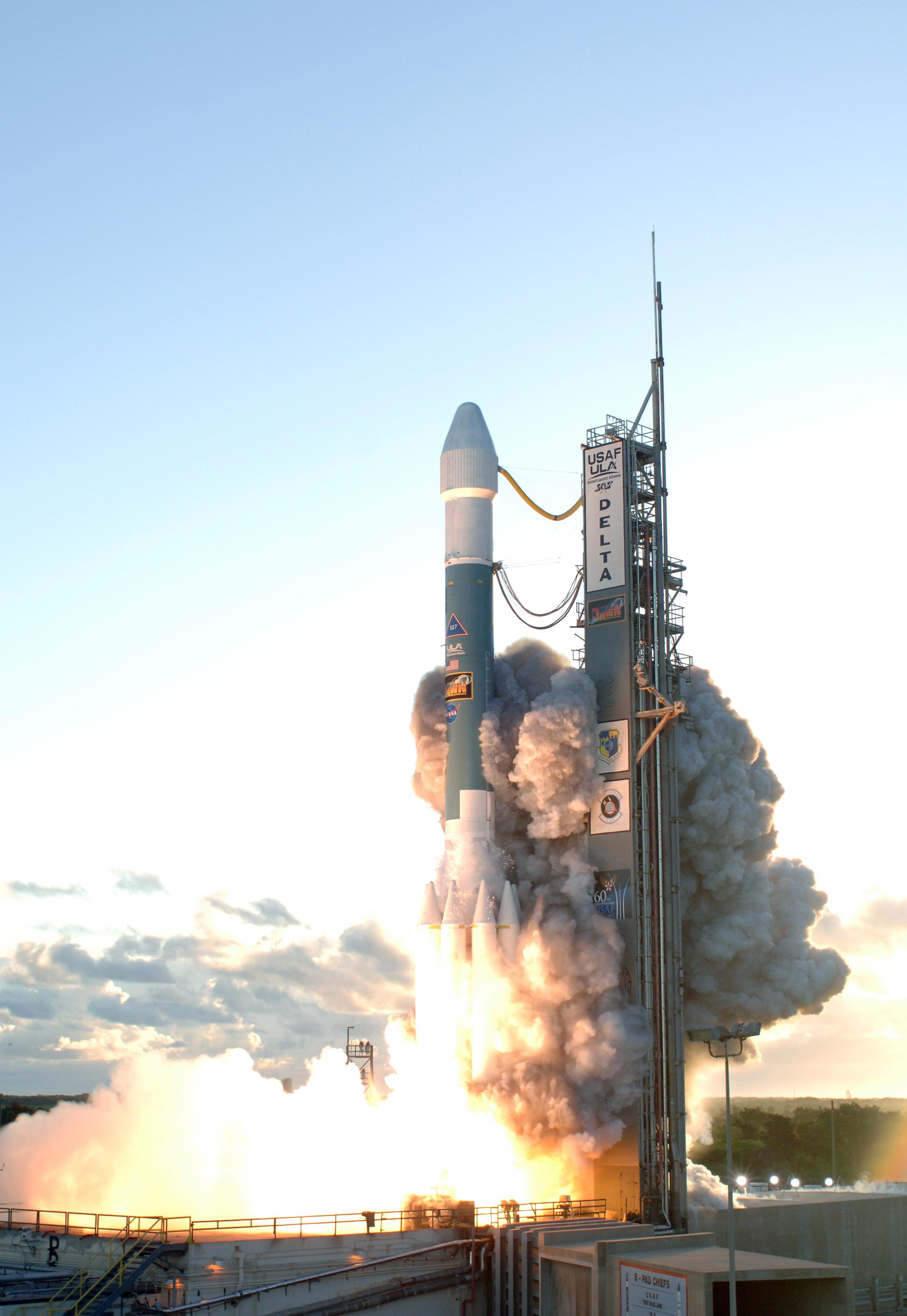
- A Delta II launch vehicle launches from Cape Canaveral carrying the Dawn spacecraft.
- Function: Launch vehicle
- Manufacturer: United Launch Alliance
- Country of origin: United States
- Cost per launch: US$51 million in 1987 (7920-10 model) US$137 million in 2018 before retirement

Size
- Height: 38.9 m (128 ft)
- Diameter: 2.44 m (8 ft 0 in)
- Mass: 152,000–286,000 kg (335,000–631,000 lb)
- Stages: 2 or 3

Capacity

Payload to Low Earth orbit
- Mass: 2,800–6,140 kg (6,170–13,540 lb)

Payload to Geostationary transfer orbit
- Mass: 1,140–2,190 kg (2,510–4,830 lb)

Payload to Heliocentric orbit
- Mass: 806–1,519 kg (1,777–3,349 lb)

Launch history
- Status: Retired
- Launch sites: Cape Canaveral, SLC-17; Vandenberg Air Force Base, SLC-2W
- Total launches: 155; Delta 6000: 17; Delta 7000: 132; Delta 7000H: 6
- Success(es): 153; Delta 6000: 17; Delta 7000: 130; Delta 7000H: 6
- Failure: 1 (Delta 7000)
- Partial failure: 1 (Delta 7000)
- First flight: Delta 6000: 14 February 1989 (USA-35); Delta 7000: 26 November 1990 (USA-66); Delta 7000H: 8 July 2003 (Opportunity rover)
- Last flight: Delta 6000: 24 July 1992 (Geotail); Delta 7000: 15 September 2018 (ICESat-2); Delta 7000H: 10 September 2011 (GRAIL)

Boosters (6000 Series) – Castor 4A
- No. boosters: 9
- Powered by: Solid
- Maximum thrust: 478 kN (107,000 lb_{f})
- Specific impulse: 266 s (2.61 km/s)
- Burn time: 56 seconds

Boosters (7000 Series) – GEM 40
- No. boosters: 3, 4, or 9
- Powered by: Solid
- Maximum thrust: 492.9 kN (110,800 lb_{f})
- Specific impulse: 274 s (2.69 km/s)
- Burn time: 64 seconds

Boosters (7000 Heavy) – GEM 46
- No. boosters: 9
- Powered by: Solid
- Maximum thrust: 628.3 kN (141,200 lb_{f})
- Specific impulse: 278 s (2.73 km/s)
- Burn time: 76 seconds or 178.03 seconds after lift off

First stage – Thor/Delta XLT(-C)
- Powered by: 1 RS-27 (6000 series) or RS-27A (7000 series)
- Maximum thrust: 1,054 kN (237,000 lb_{f})
- Specific impulse: 302 s (2.96 km/s)
- Burn time: 260.5 seconds
- Propellant: RP-1 / LOX

Second stage – Delta K
- Powered by: 1 AJ10-118K
- Maximum thrust: 43.6 kN (9,800 lb_{f})
- Specific impulse: 319 s (3.13 km/s)
- Burn time: 431 seconds
- Propellant: N_{2}O_{4} / Aerozine 50

Third stage – PAM-D (optional)
- Powered by: Star 48B
- Maximum thrust: 66 kN (15,000 lb_{f})
- Specific impulse: 286 s (2.80 km/s)
- Burn time: 87 seconds

Delta II was an expendable launch system, originally designed and built by McDonnell Douglas. Delta II was part of the Delta rocket family and entered service in 1989. Delta II vehicles included the Delta 6000, and the two later Delta 7000 variants ("Lite" and "Heavy"). The rocket flew its final mission ICESat-2 on 15 September 2018, earning the launch vehicle a streak of 100 successful missions in a row, with the last failure being GPS IIR-1 in 1997.

The Delta II series was developed after the 1986 Challenger accident and consisted of the Delta 6000-series and 7000-series, with two variants (Lite and Heavy) of the latter.

The Delta 6000-series introduced the Extra Extended Long Tank first stage, which was 12 feet longer, and the Castor 4A boosters. Six SRBs ignited at takeoff and three ignited in the air.

The Delta 7000-series introduced the RS-27A main engine, which was modified for efficiency at high altitude at some cost to low-altitude performance, and the lighter and more powerful GEM-40 solid boosters from Hercules. The Delta II Med-Lite was a 7000-series with no third stage and fewer strap-ons (often three, sometimes four) that was usually used for small NASA missions. The Delta II Heavy was a Delta II 792X with the enlarged GEM-46 boosters from Delta III.

== Launch statistics ==
=== Launch outcome ===
- Failure
- Partial Failure
- Success

=== Launch sites ===
- Cape Canaveral, SLC-17A
- Cape Canaveral, SLC-17B
- Vandenberg, SLC-2W

=== Launch configuration ===
- 6000-series
- 7000-series
- 7000 Heavy

=== Launch destination ===
- LEO
- SSO
- MEO
- GTO
- HEO
- TLI
- Heliocentric

== Launches ==
Flight No.	Date / time (UTC)	Rocket, Configuration	Launch site	Payload	Payload mass	Orbit	Customer	Launch outcome
1	14 February 1989; 18:30	Delta II 6925	CCAFS, LC-17A	USA-35 (GPS II-1)	840 kg	MEO	U.S. Air Force	Success
1	Maiden flight of the Delta II, First 6000-series launch, Navigation satellite							
2	10 June 1989; 22:30	Delta II 6925	CCAFS, LC-17A	USA-38 (GPS II-2)	840 kg	MEO	U.S. Air Force	Success
2	Navigation satellite							
3	18 August 1989; 05:58	Delta II 6925	CCAFS, LC-17A	USA-42 (GPS II-3)	840 kg	MEO	U.S. Air Force	Success
3	First night launch of Delta II, Navigation satellite							
4	21 October 1989; 09:31	Delta II 6925	CCAFS, LC-17A	USA-47 (GPS II-4)	840 kg	MEO	U.S. Air Force	Success
4	Navigation satellite							
5	11 December 1989; 18:10	Delta II 6925	CCAFS, LC-17B	USA-49 (GPS II-5)	840 kg	MEO	U.S. Air Force	Success
5	First Delta II launch from SLC-17B, Navigation satellite							
6	24 January 1990; 22:55	Delta II 6925	CCAFS, LC-17A	USA-50 (GPS II-6)	840 kg	MEO	U.S. Air Force	Success
6	Navigation satellite							
7	14 February 1990; 16:15	Delta II 6920-8	CCAFS, LC-17B	LACE / RME	2,470 kg	LEO	NASA	Success
7	Military research							
8	26 March 1990; 02:45	Delta II 6925	CCAFS, SLC-17A	USA-54 (GPS II-7)	840 kg	MEO	US Air Force	Success
8	GPS Block II satellite							
9	13 April 1990; 22:28	Delta II 6925-8	CCAFS, LC-17B	Palapa B2R		GTO	NewSat	Success
9	First commercial Delta II launch, Comsat							
10	1 June 1990; 02:48	Delta II 6920-10	CCAFS, LC-17A	ROSAT	2,42 kg	LEO	NASA / DLR	Success
10	Space telescope designed for x-ray astronomy							
11	2 August 1990; 05:39	Delta II 6925	CCAFS LC-17A	USA-63 (GPS II-8)	840 kg	MEO	US Air Force	Success
11	Navigation satellite							
12	18 August 1990; 00:42	Delta II 6925	CCAFS LC-17B	Thor 1 (BSB-R2)		GTO		Success
12	Comsat							
13	1 October 1990; 2:56	Delta II 6925	CCAFS LC-17A	USA-64 (GPS II-9)	840 kg	MEO	US Air Force	Success
13	Navigation satellite							
14	30 October 1990; 23:16	Delta II 6925	CCAFS LC-17B	Inmarsat-2 F1		GTO	Inmarsat	Success
14	200th Delta launch, Maritime comsat							
15	26 November 1990; 2:39	Delta II 7925	CCAFS LC-17A	USA-66 (GPS IIA-1)	1,816 kg	MEO	US Air Force	Success
15	First 7000-series launch, Navigation satellite							
16	8 January 1991; 00:53	Delta II 7925	CCAFS LC-17B	NATO 4A	1,433 kg	GTO	NATO	Success
16	Comsat							
17	8 March 1991; 23:03	Delta II 6925	CCAFS LC-17B	Inmarsat-2 F2		GTO	Inmarsat	Success
17	Comsat							
18	13 April 1991; 00:09	Delta II 7925	CCAFS LC-17B	ASC-2 (Spacenet F4)		GTO		Success
18	Communications satellite							
19	29 May 1991; 22:55	Delta II 7925	CCAFS LC-17B	Aurora 2		GTO		Success
19	Communications satellite							
20	4 July 1991; 02:32	Delta II 7925	CCAFS LC-17A	USA-71 (GPS IIA-2)	1,816 kg	MEO	US Air Force	Success
20	GPS Block IIA satellite							
21	23 February 1992; 22:29	Delta II 7925-9.5	CCAFS, LC-17B	USA-79 (GPS IIA-3)	840 kg	MEO	U.S. Air Force	Success
21	Navigation satellite							
22	10 April 1992; 03:1	Delta II 7925-9.5	CCAFS, LC-17B	USA-80 (GPS IIA-4)	840 kg	MEO	U.S. Air Force	Success
22	Navigation satellite							
23	14 May 1992; 00:40	Delta II 7925	CCAFS, LC-17B	Palapa B4		GTO	Indosat	Success
23	Communications satellite							
24	7 June 1992; 16:40	Delta II 6920-10	CCAFS, LC-17A	EUVE	3,275 kg	LEO	NASA	Success
24	Space telescope designed for ultraviolet astronomy							
25	7 July 1992; 09:1	Delta II 7925-9.5	CCAFS, LC-17B	USA-83 (GPS IIA-5)	840 kg	MEO	U.S. Air Force	Success
25	Navigation satellite							
26	24 July 1992; 14:26	Delta II 6925	CCAFS, LC-17A	GEOTAIL	980 kg	HEO	NASA	Success
26	Final 6000-series launch, Earth observation satellite							
27	31 August 1992; 10:41	Delta II 7925	CCAFS, LC-17B	Satcom C4		GTO		Success
27	Communications satellite							
28	9 September 1992; 08:57	Delta II 7925-9.5	CCAFS, LC-17A	USA-84 (GPS IIA-6)	840 kg	MEO	U.S. Air Force	Success
28	Navigation satellite							
29	12 October 1992; 09:47	Delta II 7925	CCAFS, LC-17B	DFS Kopernikus-3	850 kg	GTO	Deutsche Bundespost	Success
29	Communications satellite							
30	22 November 1992; 23:54	Delta II 7925-9.5	CCAFS, LC-17A	USA-85 (GPS IIA-7)	840 kg	MEO	U.S. Air Force	Success
30	Navigation satellite							
31	18 December 1992; 22:16	Delta II 7925-9.5	CCAFS, LC-17B	USA-87 (GPS IIA-8)	840 kg	MEO	U.S. Air Force	Success
31	Navigation satellite							
32	3 February 1993; 02:55	Delta II 7925	CCAFS LC-17A	USA-88 (GPS IIA-9)	1,816 kg	MEO	US Air Force	Success
32	Navigation satellite							
33	30 March 1993; 03:09	Delta II 7925	CCAFS LC-17A	USA-90 (GPS IIA-10)/SEDS-1	1,816 kg	MEO/LEO	US Air Force	Success
33	Navigation satellite/Tether demonstration							
34	13 May 1993; 00:07	Delta II 7925	CCAFS LC-17A	USA-91 (GPS IIA-11)	1,816 kg	MEO	US Air Force	Success
34	Navigation satellite							
35	26 June 1993; 13:27	Delta II 7925	CCAFS LC-17A	USA-92 (GPS IIA-12)/PMG	1,816 kg	MEO/LEO	US Air Force	Success
35	Navigation satellite/Technology demonstration							
36	30 August 1993; 12:38	Delta II 7925	CCAFS LC-17B	USA-94 (GPS IIA-13)	1,816 kg	MEO	US Air Force	Success
36	Navigation satellite							
37	26 October 1993; 17:04	Delta II 7925	CCAFS LC-17B	USA-96 (GPS IIA-14)	1,816 kg	MEO	US Air Force	Success
37	Navigation satellite							
38	8 December 1993; 00:48	Delta II 7925	CCAFS LC-17A	NATO 4B		GTO	NATO	Success
38	Communications satellite							
39	19 February 1994; 23:45	Delta II 7925-8	CCAFS LC-17B	Galaxy 1R		GTO	Intelsat	Success
39	Communications satellite							
40	10 March 1994; 03:40	Delta II 7925	CCAFS LC-17A	USA-100 (GPS IIA-15)/SEDS-2	1,816 kg	MEO/LEO	US Air Force	Success
40	Navigation satellite/Tether demonstration							
41	1 November 1994; 09:31	Delta II 7925-10	CCAFS LC-17B	Wind	1,195 kg	Heliocentric	NASA	Success
41	First Delta II launch past GTO, Sent to L_{1} Lagrange point, studies radio waves and plasma in solar wind, expected to operate until 2070							
42	5 August 1995; 11:10	Delta II 7925-9.5	CCAFS LC-17B	Koreasat 1	711 kg	GTO	KT Corporation	Partial failure
42	Communications satellite, One SRB failed to separate, slowing the booster's orbital velocity. Spacecraft eventually reached correct orbit but with substantially shortened operational life.							
43	4 November 1995; 14:22	Delta II 7920-10	VAFB SLC-2W	RADARSAT-1 and SURFSAT	2,750 kg	Geocentric	CSA	Success
43	Communications satellite, First Delta II launch from Vandenberg							
44	30 December 1995; 13:48	Delta II 7920-10	CCAFS LC-17A	XTE	3,200 kg	LEO	NASA	Success
44	Communications satellite							
45	14 January 1996; 11:10	Delta II 7925	CCAFS LC-17B	Koreasat-2				Success
46	17 February 1996; 20:43	Delta II 7925-8	CCAFS LC-17B	NEAR	487 kg	Heliocentric	NASA	Success
46	First Delta II launch to another planetary body, orbiter of 433 Eros, first spacecraft to orbit and land on an asteroid, later renamed NEAR Shoemaker							
47	24 February 1996; 11:24	Delta II 7925-10	VAFB SLC-2W	Polar	1,300 kg	Geocentric	NASA	Success
47	Earth observation satellite							
48	28 March 1996; 00:21	Delta II 7925	CCAFS LC-17B	USA-117 (GPS IIA-16)	1,816 kg	MEO	US Air Force	Success
48	Navigation satellite							
49	24 April 1996; 12:27	Delta II 7920-10	VAFB SLC-2W	MSX	2,700 kg	Geocentric	BMDO	Success
49	Infrared telescope							
50	24 May 1996; 01:10	Delta II 7925	CCAFS LC-17B	Galaxy 9	700 kg	GSO	PanAmSat / Intelsat	Success
50	Communications satellite							
51	16 July 1996; 00:50	Delta II 7925	CCAFS LC-17A	USA-126 (GPS IIA-17)	1,816 kg	MEO	US Air Force	Success
51	Navigation satellite							
52	12 September 1996; 08:49	Delta II 7925	CCAFS LC-17A	USA-128 (GPS IIA-18)	1,816 kg	MEO	US Air Force	Success
52	Navigation satellite							
53	7 November 1996; 17:00	Delta II 7925	CCAFS LC-17A	Mars Global Surveyor	1,030.5 kg	Heliocentric	NASA	Success
53	First Delta II launch to another planet, Mars orbiter, first successful Mars spacecraft since Viking program							
54	4 December 1996; 06:58	Delta II 7925	CCAFS LC-17B	Mars Pathfinder	264 kg	Heliocentric	NASA	Success
54	Mars lander and rover, first rover (Sojourner) on another planet							
55	17 January 1997; 16:28	Delta II 7925-9.5	CCAFS SLC-17A	GPS IIR-1	2,030 kg	Planned: MEO	US Air Force	Failure
55	Exploded 13 seconds after launch due to SRB failure. Navigation satellite							
56	5 May 1997; 14:55	Delta II 7920-10C	VAFB SLC-2W	MS-1		LEO	Iridium	Success
56	Five Iridium satellites							
57	20 May 1997; 22:39	Delta II 7925-9.5	CCAFS SLC-17A	Telenor Thor II	1,467 kg	GTO	Telenor	Success
57	Hughes HS 376 satellite							
58	9 July 1997; 13:04	Delta II 7920-10C	VAFB SLC-2W	MS-2		LEO	Iridium	Success
58	Five Iridium satellites							
59	23 July 1997; 03:43	Delta II 7925-9.5	CCAFS SLC-17A	USA-132 (GPS IIR-2)	2,032 kg	MEO	US Air Force	Success
59	Navigation satellite							
60	21 August 1997; 00:38	Delta II 7920-10C	VAFB SLC-2W	MS-3		LEO	Iridium	Success
60	Five Iridium satellites							
61	25 August 1997; 14:39	Delta II 7920-8	CCAFS SLC-17A	Advanced Composition Explorer (ACE)	562 kg	Heliocentric	NASA	Success
61	Solar wind and cosmic-ray research							
62	27 September 1997; 01:23	Delta II 7920-10C	VAFB SLC-2W	MS-4		LEO	Iridium	Success
62	Five Iridium satellites							
63	6 November 1997; 00:30	Delta II 7925	CCAFS SLC-17A	USA-134 (GPS IIA-19)	2,032 kg	MEO	US Air Force	Success
63	Navigation satellite							
64	9 November 1997; 01:34	Delta II 7920-10C	VAFB SLC-2W	MS-5		LEO	Iridium	Success
64	Five Iridium satellites							
65	20 December 1997; 13:16	Delta II 7920-10C	VAFB SLC-2W	MS-6		LEO	Iridium	Success
65	Five Iridium satellites							
66	10 January 1998; 00:32	Delta II 7925-9.5	CCAFS SLC-17B	Skynet 4D			Astrium Services	Success
67	14 February 1998; 14:34	Delta II 7420-10C	CCAFS SLC-17A	Globalstar-1	550 kg	LEO	Globalstar	Success
67	Four SS/L satellites							
68	18 February 1998; 13:58	Delta II 7920-10C	VAFB SLC-2W	MS-7		LEO	Iridium	Success
68	Five Iridium satellites							
69	30 March 1998; 06:02	Delta II 7920-10C	VAFB SLC-2W	MS-8		LEO	Iridium	Success
69	Five Iridium satellites							
70	24 April 1998; 22:38	Delta II 7420-10C	CCAFS SLC-17A	Globalstar-2	550 kg	LEO	Globalstar	Success
70	Four SS/L satellites							
71	17 May 1998; 21:16	Delta II 7920-10C	VAFB SLC-2W	MS-9		LEO	Iridium	Success
71	Five Iridium satellites							
72	10 June 1998; 00:35	Delta II 7925-9.5	CCAFS SLC-17A	Thor III		GEO	Telenor	Success
73	8 September 1998; 21:13	Delta II 7920-10C	VAFB SLC-2W	MS-10		LEO	Iridium	Success
73	Five Iridium satellites							
74	24 October 1998; 12:08	Delta II 7326	CCAFS SLC-17A	Deep Space 1	373 kg	Heliocentric	NASA	Success
74	Satellite Technology							
75	6 November 1998; 13:37	Delta II 7920-10C	VAFB SLC-2W	MS-11		LEO	Iridium	Success
75	Five Iridium satellites							
76	22 November 1998; 23:54	Delta II 7925-9.5	CCAFS SLC-17B	BONUM-1				Success
77	11 December 1998; 18:45	Delta II 7425	CCAFS SLC-17A	Mars Climate Orbiter	338 kg	Heliocentric	NASA	Success
77	Payload later failed, Mars orbiter							
78	3 January 1999; 20:21	Delta II 7425	CCAFS SLC-17B	Mars Polar Lander	290 kg	Heliocentric	NASA	Success
78	Payload later failed, Mars lander							
79	7 February 1999; 21:04	Delta II 7426	CCAFS SLC-17A	Stardust	305.397 kg	Heliocentric	NASA	Success
79	Comet trail sample return mission, surviving elements renamed to NExT							
80	23 February 1999; 10:29	Delta II 7920-10	VAFB SLC-2W	ARGOS (P91-1 ARGOS), Ørsted and SUNSAT	2,450 kg	Polar orbit	AFRL / NRL / STP	Success
80	At a mission cost of $220M, ARGOS, with its nine payloads, was the USAF's largest R&D mission. Both Ørsted and SUNSAT were their respective countries first satellites. Research and development, scientific							
81	15 April 1999; 18:32	Delta II 7920-10	VAFB SLC-2W	Landsat 7	2,200 kg	SSO	NASA	Success
82	10 June 1999; 13:48	Delta II 7420-10C	CCAFS SLC-17B	Globalstar 3	550 kg	LEO	Globalstar	Success
83	24 June 1999; 15:44	Delta II 7320-10	CCAFS SLC-17A	FUSE	1,360 kg	LEO	NASA	Success
83	Space telescope							
84	10 July 1999; 08:45	Delta II 7420-10C	CCAFS SLC-17B	Globalstar 4	550 kg	LEO	Globalstar	Success
85	25 July 1999; 07:46	Delta II 7420-10C	CCAFS SLC-17A	Globalstar 5	550 kg	LEO	Globalstar	Success
86	17 August 1999; 04:37	Delta II 7420-10C	CCAFS SLC-17B	Globalstar 6	550 kg	LEO	Globalstar	Success
87	7 October 1999; 12:51	Delta II 7925-9.5	CCAFS SLC-17A	USA-145 (GPS IIR-3)	2,032 kg	MEO	US Air Force	Success
87	Navigation satellite							
88	8 February 2000; 21:24	Delta II 7420-10C	CCAFS SLC-17B	Globalstar 7	550 kg	LEO	Globalstar	Success
88	Mobile Communications							
89	25 March 2000; 20:34	Delta II 7326-9.5	VAFB SLC-2W	IMAGE	210 kg	Polar	NASA	Success
89	Solar Wind Monitoring							
90	11 May 2000; 01:48	Delta II 7925-9.5	CCAFS SLC-17A	USA-150 (GPS IIR-4)	2,032 kg	MEO	US Air Force	Success
90	Navigation satellite							
91	17 July 2000; 09:17	Delta II 7925-9.5	CCAFS SLC-17A	USA-151 (GPS IIR-5)	2,032 kg	MEO	US Air Force	Success
91	Navigation satellite							
92	10 November 2000; 17:14	Delta II 7925-9.5	CCAFS SLC-17A	USA-154 (GPS IIR-6)	2,032 kg	MEO	US Air Force	Success
92	Navigation satellite							
93	21 November 2000; 18:24	Delta II 7320-10	VAFB SLC-2W	EO-1/SAC-C	573 kg	LEO	NASA	Success
93	Earth Observing							
94	30 January 2001; 07:55	Delta II 7925-9.5	CCAFS SLC-17A	USA-156 (GPS IIR-7)	2,032 kg	MEO	US Air Force	Success
94	Navigation satellite							
95	7 April 2001; 15:02	Delta II 7925-9.5	CCAFS SLC-17A	2001 Mars Odyssey	376.3 kg	Heliocentric	NASA	Success
95	Mars orbiter, spacecraft later became the longest operation Mars spacecraft to date							
96	18 May 2001; 17:45	Delta II 7925-9.5	CCAFS SLC-17B	GeoLITE	1800 kg	GTO	US NRO	Success
96	Technology Demonstrator							
97	30 June 2001; 19:46	Delta II 7425-10	CCAFS SLC-17B	WMAP	763 kg	Sun-Earth L2	NASA	Success
97	Cosmic microwave background experiments, First flight with a 10-foot (3.0 m) composite fairing.							
98	8 August 2001; 16:13	Delta II 7326-9.5	CCAFS SLC-17A	Genesis Probe	494 kg	Heliocentric	NASA	Success
98	Solar Wind sample return							
99	18 October 2001; 18:51	Delta II 7320-10	VAFB SLC-2W	QuickBird	951 kg	SSO	DigitalGlobe	Success
99	Earth Imaging							
100	2001-12-07; 15:07	Delta II 7920-10	VAFB SLC-2W	Jason-1/TIMED	1160 kg	LEO	NASA	Success
100	100th Delta II launch, Earth Observation							
101	11 February 2002; 17:43	Delta II 7920-10C	VAFB SLC-2W	Iridium IS-1	689 kg	LEO	Iridium Communications	Success
101	Mobile Communications							
102	4 May 2002; 09:54	Delta II 7920-10L	VAFB SLC-2W	Aqua	3,117 kg	LEO	NASA	Success
102	Earth Observation							
103	3 July 2002; 06:47	Delta II 7425	CCAFS SLC-17A	CONTOUR	328 kg	Heliocentric	NASA	Success
103	Payload later failed, Comet probe							
104	13 January 2003; 00:45	Delta II 7320-10	VAFB SLC-2W	ICESat, CHIPSat	1304 kg	SSO	NASA	Success
104	Earth science satellite, Astronomical satellite							
105	29 January 2003; 18:06	Delta II 7925-9.5	CCAFS SLC-17B	USA-166 (GPS IIR-8)	2,032 kg	MEO	US Air Force	Success
105	Navigation satellite							
106	31 March 2003; 22:09	Delta II 7925-9.5	CCAFS SLC-17A	USA-168 (GPS IIR-9)	2,032 kg	MEO	US Air Force	Success
106	Navigation satellite							
107	10 June 2003; 17:58	Delta II 7925-9.5	CCAFS SLC-17A	Spirit (MER-A)	185 kg	Heliocentric	NASA	Success
107	Mars rover							
108	8 July 2003; 03:18	Delta II 7925H-9.5	CCAFS SLC-17B	Opportunity (MER-B)	185 kg	Heliocentric	NASA	Success
108	Mars rover, First Delta II Heavy launch (with GEM 46s used on the Delta III)							
109	25 August 2003; 05:35	Delta II 7920H-9.5	CCAFS SLC-17B	Spitzer Space Telescope (SIRTF)	851.5 kg	Heliocentric	NASA	Success
109	Infrared telescope, 300th Delta rocket mission, First Delta II Heavy launch without a third-stage motor							
110	21 December 2003; 08:05	Delta II 7925-9.5	CCAFS SLC-17A	USA-175 (GPS IIR-10)	2,032 kg	MEO	US Air Force	Success
110	Navigation satellite							
111	20 March 2004; 17:53	Delta II 7925-9.5	CCAFS SLC-17B	USA-177 (GPS IIR-11)	2,032 kg	MEO	US Air Force	Success
111	Navigation satellite							
112	20 April 2004; 16:57	Delta II 7920-10C	VAFB SLC-2W	Gravity Probe B	3,100 kg	Polar Orbit	NASA	Success
112	Science satellite							
113	23 June 2004; 22:54	Delta II 7925-9.5	CCAFS SLC-17B	USA-178 (GPS IIR-12)	2,032 kg	MEO	US Air Force	Success
113	Navigation satellite							
114	15 July 2004; 10:02	Delta II 7920-10L	VAFB SLC-2W	Aura	2,970 kg	SSO	NASA	Success
114	Atmospheric science satellite, First use of a stretched 10-foot (3.0 m)-wide fairing							
115	3 August 2004; 06:15	Delta II 7925H-9.5	CCAFS SLC-17B	MESSENGER	1,107.9 kg	Heliocentric	NASA	Success
115	Mission to Mercury, first spacecraft to visit Mercury since Mariner 10 and first to orbit Mercury							
116	6 November 2004; 05:39	Delta II 7925-9.5	CCAFS SLC-17B	USA-180 (GPS IIR-13)	2,032 kg	MEO	US Air Force	Success
116	Navigation satellite							
117	20 November 2004; 17:16	Delta II 7320-10C	CCAFS SLC-17A	Swift	843 kg	LEO	NASA	Success
117	Gamma-ray telescope							
118	12 January 2005; 18:47	Delta II 7925-9.5	CCAFS, SLC-17B	Deep Impact	650 kg	Heliocentric	NASA	Success
118	Comet impactor and flyby probe, surviving elements later renamed EPOXI							
119	20 May 2005; 10:22	Delta II 7320-10C	VAFB, SLC-2W	NOAA-18	1457 kg	SSO	NOAA	Success
119	Weather satellite							
120	26 September 2005; 03:37	Delta II 7925-9.5	CCAFS, SLC-17A	USA-183 (GPS IIR-M-1)	2,032 kg	MEO	U.S. Air Force	Success
120	Navigation satellite							
121	28 April 2006; 10:02	Delta II 7420-10C	VAFB SLC-2W	CloudSat, CALIPSO	1287 kg	SSO	NASA	Success
121	Two Atmospheric Satellites							
122	21 June 2006; 22:15	Delta II 7925-9.5	CCAFS SLC-17A	Microsatellite Technology Experiment (MiTEx) (USA 187/USA 188/USA 189)		GTO	US Air Force	Success
122	Navy upper stage test, small sat launch							
123	25 September 2006; 18:50	Delta II 7925-9.5	CCAFS SLC-17A	USA-190 (GPS IIR-M-2)	2,032 kg	MEO	US Air Force	Success
123	Navigation satellite							
124	26 October 2006; 00:52	Delta II 7925-10L	CCAFS SLC-17B	STEREO	547 kg	Heliocentric	NASA	Success
124	Two solar observatories							
125	17 November 2006; 19:12	Delta II 7925-9.5	CCAFS SLC-17A	USA-192 (GPS IIR-M-3)	2,032 kg	MEO	US Air Force	Success
125	Navigation satellite							
126	14 December 2006; 21:00	Delta II 7920-10	VAFB SLC-2W	USA-193 (NROL-21)	2,300 kg	LEO	US NRO	Success
126	First launch by United Launch Alliance. Reconnaissance satellite. Payload failed shortly after deployment; would eventually be destroyed on 20 February 2008, by an ASAT. See also: Operation Burnt Frost							
127	17 February 2007; 23:01	Delta II 7925-10C	CCAFS SLC-17B	THEMIS	77 kg	HEO	NASA	Success
127	Five magnetosphere observatories							
128	8 June 2007; 02:34	Delta II 7420-10	VAFB SLC-2W	COSMO-SkyMed 1		LEO	ASI	Success
128	Earth imaging/reconnaissance, Italian government							
129	4 August 2007; 09:26	Delta II 7925	CCAFS SLC-17A	Phoenix	350 kg	Heliocentric	NASA	Success
129	Mars lander							
130	18 September 2007; 18:35	Delta II 7920-10	VAFB SLC-2W	DigitalGlobe WorldView-1	2,500 kg	SSO	DigitalGlobe	Success
130	Commercial Earth imaging satellite							
131	27 September 2007; 11:34	Delta II 7925H-9.5	CCAFS SLC-17B	Dawn	747.1 kg	Heliocentric	NASA	Success
131	First purposeful mission to the Asteroid Belt, 4 Vesta and 1 Ceres orbiter, first spacecraft to orbit two different planetary bodies							
132	17 October 2007; 12:23	Delta II 7925-9.5	CCAFS SLC-17A	USA-196 (GPS IIR-M-4)	2,032 kg	MEO	US Air Force	Success
132	Navigation satellite							
133	9 December 2007; 02:31	Delta II 7420-10	VAFB SLC-2W	COSMO-2		LEO	ASI	Success
133	Italian government, Earth imaging/reconnaissance							
134	20 December 2007; 20:04	Delta II 7925-9.5	CCAFS SLC-17A	USA-199 (GPS IIR-M-5)	2,032 kg	MEO	US Air Force	Success
134	Navigation satellite							
135	15 March 2008; 06:10	Delta II 7925-9.5	CCAFS SLC-17A	USA-201 (GPS IIR-M-6)	2,032 kg	MEO	US Air Force	Success
135	80th consecutive successful launch, Navigation satellite							
136	11 June 2008; 16:05	Delta II 7920H-10C	CCAFS SLC-17B	GLAST	4,303 kg	LEO	NASA	Success
136	First Delta II Heavy launch with a 10-foot (3.0 m)-wide composite fairing, Gamma-ray Telescope							
137	20 June 2008; 07:46	Delta II 7320	VAFB SLC-2W	Jason-2	510 kg	LEO	NASA	Success
137	Ocean topography							
138	6 September 2008; 18:50	Delta II 7420-10	VAFB SLC-2W	GeoEye-1	1,955 kg	LEO	DigitalGlobe	Success
138	Earth imaging							
139	25 October 2008; 02:28	Delta II 7420	VAFB SLC-2W	COSMO-3		LEO	ASI	Success
139	Earth imaging/reconnaissance							
140	6 February 2009; 10:22	Delta II 7320-10C	VAFB SLC-2W	NOAA-19 (NOAA-N Prime)	1,440 kg	SSO	NOAA	Success
140	Weather satellite							
141	7 March 2009; 03:49	Delta II 7925-10L	CCAFS SLC-17B	Kepler	478 kg	Heliocentric	NASA	Success
141	Space photometer							
142	24 March 2009; 08:34	Delta II 7925-9.5	CCAFS SLC-17A	USA-203 (GPS IIR-M-7)	2,032 kg	MEO	US Air Force	Success
142	Navigation satellite							
143	5 May 2009; 20:24	Delta II 7920-10C	VAFB SLC-2W	USA-205 (STSS-ATRR/GMD Block 2010 SRR)	Classified	LEO	MDA	Success
143	Satellite Technology							
144	17 August 2009; 10:35	Delta II 7925	CCAFS SLC-17A	USA-206 (GPS IIRM-8)	2,032 kg	MEO	US Air Force	Success
144	Navigation satellite, Final launch from SLC-17A, Final Delta II launch for the USAF, Final use of the 7925 configuration							
145	25 September 2009; 12:20	Delta II 7920-10C	CCAFS SLC-17B	USA-208/209 (STSS Demo/GMD Block 2006)		LEO	US Air Force	Success
145	90th consecutive success for Delta II, Missile Defense Technology test							
146	8 October 2009; 18:51	Delta II 7920-10C	VAFB SLC-2W	WorldView-2	2,800 kg	LEO	DigitalGlobe	Success
146	Earth imaging/reconnaissance							
147	14 December 2009; 14:09	Delta II 7320-10C	VAFB SLC-2W	WISE	347 kg	LEO	NASA	Success
147	Space telescope							
148	6 November 2010; 02:20	Delta II 7420-10C	VAFB SLC-2W	COSMO-4	1,900 kg	SSO	Italian Space Agency	Success
148	Earth imaging / One of four reconnaissance and Earth observation satellites. The satellite's imagery will be applied to defense and security assurance in Italy and other countries, seismic hazard analysis, environmental disaster monitoring, and agricultural mapping.							
149	10 June 2011; 14:20	Delta II 7320-10C	VAFB SLC-2W	SAC-D	1,350 kg	SSO	CONAE / NASA	Success
149	A technology demonstration and Earth observation satellite. The launch was delayed from May 2010 because development of the spacecraft was taking longer than expected.							
150	10 September 2011; 13:08	Delta II 7920H-10C	CCAFS SLC-17B	GRAIL	307 kg	Lunar orbit	NASA/JPL	Success
150	Final Delta II Heavy launch and final launch from SLC-17 at CCAFS. Part of NASA's Discovery Program which used high-quality gravitational field mapping of the Moon to determine its interior structure. The launch was delayed several days due to high level winds and an issue with the rocket's propulsion system that was detected while the Delta II rocket was drained of fuel.							
151	28 October 2011; 09:48	Delta II 7920-10C	VAFB SLC-2W	Suomi NPP / ELaNa III	1,400 kg	SSO	NASA / NOAA / DoD	Success
151	A weather satellite that acts as a bridge between POES satellites and the Joint Polar Satellite System. The satellite measures climate data. The launch also included the secondary payload ELaNa III, 5 CubeSats that are part of the Educational Launch of Nanosatellites NASA program.							
152	2 July 2014; 09:56	Delta II 7320-10C	VAFB SLC-2W	OCO-2	454 kg	SSO	NASA	Success
152	Climate research satellite being used to study carbon dioxide concentrations and distributions in the atmosphere. The initial launch attempt on 1 July at 09:56:44 UTC was scrubbed at 46 seconds on the countdown clock due to a faulty valve on the water suppression system, used to flow water on the launch pad to dampen the acoustic energy during launch.							
153	31 January 2015; 14:22	Delta II 7320-10C	VAFB SLC-2W	SMAP/ELaNa X	944 kg	SSO	NASA	Success
153	Final launch of Delta II 7300 series. Environmental research satellite. SMAP provides measurements of the land surface soil moisture and freeze-thaw state with near-global revisit coverage in 2–3 days. The launch also included the secondary payload ELaNa X, 3 CubeSats that are part of the Educational Launch of Nanosatellites NASA program.							
154	18 November 2017; 09:47	Delta II 7920-10C	VAFB SLC-2W	JPSS-1/NOAA-20	2,540 kg	SSO	NOAA	Success
154	Final flight of the Delta II 7900 series. The NOAA-20 launch was delayed several times, from 2014 to 2017, due to various testing problems. First satellite of the JPSS series weather satellite system. JPSS will provide the global environmental data used in numerical weather prediction models for forecasts, and scientific data used for climate monitoring. Re-designated NOAA-20.							
155	15 September 2018, 13:02	Delta II 7420-10C	VAFB SLC-2W	ICESat-2	1,514 kg	LEO	NASA	Success
155	Final Delta II launch and final flight of a Thor-derived launch vehicle. 100th successful launch of a Delta II in a row. Earth science satellite.							
