= List of Thor and Delta launches (1990–1999) =

Between 1990 and 1999, there were 89 Thor-based rockets launched, of which 85 were successful, giving a 95.5% success rate.

== Launch statistics ==
=== Rocket configurations ===
- Delta I (4000)
- Delta II (6000)
- Delta II (7000)
- Delta III (8000)
- H-1

=== Launch sites ===
- Cape Canaveral SLC-17A
- Cape Canaveral SLC-17B
- Vandenberg SLC-2W
- Tanegashima SLC-N

=== Launch outcomes ===
- Success
- Partial Failure
- Failure

== Launch history ==
=== 1990 ===
There were 13 Thor missiles launched in 1990. All 13 launches were successful.

Flight No.	Date / time (UTC)	Rocket, Configuration	Launch site	Payload	Payload mass	Orbit	Customer	Launch outcome
191	January 24, 1990; 22:55	Delta II 6925	CCAFS LC-17A	USA-50 (GPS II-6)	840 kg	MEO	US Air Force	Success
191	Navigation satellite							
H-21 (F)	February 7, 1990; 01:33	H-I	Tanegashima SLC-N	MOS-1B (Momo-1B) / Oscar 20 / DEBUT		LEO / SSO	JAXA	Success
H-21 (F)	Earth observation satellite / Amateur radio satellite / Technological demonstration							
192	February 14, 1990; 16:15	Delta II 6920-8	CCAFS LC-17B	LACE / RME	2,470 kg	LEO	NASA	Success
192	Military research							
193	March 26, 1990; 02:45	Delta II 6925	CCAFS LC-17A	USA-54 (GPS II-7)	840 kg	MEO	US Air Force	Success
193	GPS Block II satellite							
194	April 13, 1990; 22:28	Delta II 6925-8	CCAFS LC-17B	Palapa B2R		GTO	NewSat	Success
194	First commercial Delta II launch, Comsat							
195	June 1, 1990; 21:48	Delta II 6920-10	CCAFS LC-17A	ROSAT	2,421 kg	LEO	NASA	Success
195	Space telescope							
196	June 12, 1990; 05:52	Delta 4925-8	CCAFS LC-17B	INSAT 1D		GTO		Success
196	Comsat, Last Delta I launch							
197	August 2, 1990; 05:39	Delta II 6925	CCAFS LC-17A	USA-63 (GPS II-8)	840 kg	MEO	US Air Force	Success
197	Navigation satellite							
198	August 18, 1990; 00:42	Delta II 6925	CCAFS LC-17B	Thor 1 (BSB-R2)		GTO		Success
198	Comsat							
H-22 (F)	August 28, 1990; 09:05	H-I	Tanegashima SLC-N	BS-3A (Yuri-3A)		GTO		Success
H-22 (F)	Direct broadcasting satellite							
199	October 1, 1990; 21:56	Delta II 6925	CCAFS LC-17A	USA-64 (GPS II-9)	840 kg	MEO	US Air Force	Success
199	Navigation satellite							
200	October 30, 1990; 23:16	Delta II 6925	CCAFS LC-17B	Inmarsat-2 F1		GTO	Inmarsat	Success
200	200th Delta launch, Maritime comsat							
201	November 26, 1990; 21:39	Delta II 7925	CCAFS LC-17A	USA-66 (GPS IIA-1)	1,816 kg	MEO	US Air Force	Success
201	First 7000-series launch, Navigation satellite							

=== 1991 ===
There were 6 Thor missiles launched in 1991. All 6 launches were successful.

Flight No.	Date / time (UTC)	Rocket, Configuration	Launch site	Payload	Payload mass	Orbit	Customer	Launch outcome
202	January 8, 1991; 00:53	Delta II 7925	CCAFS LC-17B	NATO 4A	1,433 kg	GTO	NATO	Success
202	Comsat							
203	March 8, 1991; 23:03	Delta II 6925	CCAFS LC-17B	Inmarsat-2 F2		GTO	Inmarsat	Success
203	Comsat							
204	April 13, 1991; 00:09	Delta II 7925	CCAFS LC-17B	ASC-2 (Spacenet F4)		GTO		Success
204	Communications satellite							
205	May 29, 1991; 22:55	Delta II 7925	CCAFS LC-17B	Aurora 2		GTO		Success
205	Communications satellite							
206	July 4, 1991; 02:32	Delta II 7925	CCAFS LC-17A	USA-71 (GPS IIA-2)	1,816 kg	MEO	US Air Force	Success
206	GPS Block IIA satellite							
H-23 (F)	August 25, 1991; 08:40	H-I	Tanegashima SLC-N	BS-3B (Yuri-3B)		GTO	JAXA	Success
H-23 (F)	Direct broadcasting satellite							

=== 1992 ===
There were 12 Thor missiles launched in 1992. All 12 launches were successful.

Flight No.	Date / time (UTC)	Rocket, Configuration	Launch site	Payload	Payload mass	Orbit	Customer	Launch outcome
H-24 (F)	11 February 1992; 01:50	H-I	Tanegashima, SLC-N	JERS-1 (Fuyo)		LEO / SSO	JAXA	Success
H-24 (F)	Final flight of Japanese license built Deltas; final use of Extended Long Tank Thor. Earth observation satellite							
207	23 February 1992; 22:29	Delta II 7925-9.5	CCAFS, LC-17B	USA-79 (GPS IIA-3)	840 kg	MEO	U.S. Air Force	Success
207	Navigation satellite							
208	10 April 1992; 03:20	Delta II 7925-9.5	CCAFS, LC-17B	USA-80 (GPS IIA-4)	840 kg	MEO	U.S. Air Force	Success
208	Navigation satellite							
209	14 May 1992; 00:40	Delta II 7925	CCAFS, LC-17B	Palapa B4		GTO	Indosat	Success
209	Communications satellite							
210	7 June 1992; 16:40	Delta II 6920-10	CCAFS, LC-17A	EUVE	3,275 kg	LEO	NASA	Success
210	Space telescope							
211	7 July 1992; 09:20	Delta II 7925-9.5	CCAFS, LC-17B	USA-83 (GPS IIA-5)	840 kg	MEO	U.S. Air Force	Success
211	Navigation satellite							
212	24 July 1992; 14:26	Delta II 6925	CCAFS, LC-17A	GEOTAIL	980 kg	HEO	NASA	Success
212	Final 6000-series launch, Earth observation satellite							
213	31 August 1992; 10:41	Delta II 7925	CCAFS, LC-17B	Satcom C4		GTO		Success
213	Communications satellite							
214	9 September 1992; 08:57	Delta II 7925-9.5	CCAFS, LC-17A	USA-84 (GPS IIA-6)	840 kg	MEO	U.S. Air Force	Success
214	Navigation satellite							
215	12 October 1992; 09:47	Delta II 7925	CCAFS, LC-17B	DFS Kopernikus-3	850 kg	GTO	Deutsche Bundespost	Success
215	Communications satellite							
216	22 November 1992; 23:54	Delta II 7925-9.5	CCAFS, LC-17A	USA-85 (GPS IIA-7)	840 kg	MEO	U.S. Air Force	Success
216	Navigation satellite							
217	18 December 1992; 22:16	Delta II 7925-9.5	CCAFS, LC-17B	USA-87 (GPS IIA-8)	840 kg	MEO	U.S. Air Force	Success
217	Navigation satellite							

=== 1993 ===
There were 7 Thor missiles launched in 1993. All 7 launches were successful.

Flight No.	Date / time (UTC)	Rocket, Configuration	Launch site	Payload	Payload mass	Orbit	Customer	Launch outcome
218	February 3, 1993; 02:55	Delta II 7925	CCAFS LC-17A	USA-88 (GPS IIA-9)	1,816 kg	MEO	US Air Force	Success
218	Navigation satellite							
219	March 30, 1993; 03:09	Delta II 7925	CCAFS LC-17A	USA-90 (GPS IIA-10)/SEDS-1	1,816 kg	MEO/LEO	US Air Force	Success
219	Navigation satellite/Tether demonstration							
220	May 13, 1993; 00:07	Delta II 7925	CCAFS LC-17A	USA-91 (GPS IIA-11)	1,816 kg	MEO	US Air Force	Success
220	Navigation satellite							
221	June 26, 1993; 13:27	Delta II 7925	CCAFS LC-17A	USA-92 (GPS IIA-12)/PMG	1,816 kg	MEO/LEO	US Air Force	Success
221	Navigation satellite/Technology demonstration							
222	August 30, 1993; 12:38	Delta II 7925	CCAFS LC-17B	USA-94 (GPS IIA-13)	1,816 kg	MEO	US Air Force	Success
222	Navigation satellite							
223	October 26, 1993; 17:04	Delta II 7925	CCAFS LC-17B	USA-96 (GPS IIA-14)	1,816 kg	MEO	US Air Force	Success
223	Navigation satellite							
224	December 8, 1993; 00:48	Delta II 7925	CCAFS LC-17A	NATO 4B		GTO	NATO	Success
224	Communications satellite							

=== 1994 ===
There were 3 Thor missiles launched in 1994. All 3 launches were successful.

Flight No.	Date / time (UTC)	Rocket, Configuration	Launch site	Payload	Payload mass	Orbit	Customer	Launch outcome
225	February 19, 1994; 23:45	Delta II 7925-8	CCAFS LC-17B	Galaxy 1R		GTO	Intelsat	Success
225	Communications satellite							
226	March 10, 1994; 03:40	Delta II 7925	CCAFS LC-17A	USA-100 (GPS IIA-15)/SEDS-2	1,816 kg	MEO/LEO	US Air Force	Success
226	Navigation satellite/Tether demonstration							
227	November 1, 1994; 09:31	Delta II 7925-10	CCAFS LC-17B	Wind	1,195 kg	Heliocentric	NASA	Success
227	Solar research							

=== 1995 ===
There were 3 Thor missiles launched in 1995. 2 of the 3 launches were successful, giving a 66.7% success rate.

Flight No.	Date / time (UTC)	Rocket, Configuration	Launch site	Payload	Payload mass	Orbit	Customer	Launch outcome
228	5 August 1995; 11:10	Delta II 7925–9.5	CCAFS, LC-17B	Koreasat 1	711 kg	GTO	KT Corporation	Partial failure
228	Communications satellite, One SRB failed to separate, retarding the booster's orbital velocity. Spacecraft eventually reached correct orbit but with substantially shortened operational life.							
229	4 November 1995; 14:22	Delta II 7920-10	VAFB, SLC-2W	RADARSAT-1 and SURFSAT	2,750 kg	Geocentric	CSA	Success
229	Earth observation satellite, first Delta II launch from Vandenberg.							
230	30 December 1995; 13:48:00	Delta II 7920-10	CCAFS, LC-17A	Rossi X-ray Timing Explorer	3,200 kg	Low Earth orbit	NASA	Success
230	Explorer program							

=== 1996 ===
There were 10 Thor missiles launched in 1996. All 10 launches were successful.

Flight No.	Date / time (UTC)	Rocket, Configuration	Launch site	Payload	Payload mass	Orbit	Customer	Launch outcome
231	January 14, 1996; 11:10	Delta II 7925	CCAFS LC-17B	Koreasat-2				Success
232	February 17, 1996; 20:43	Delta II 7925-8	CCAFS LC-17B	NEAR	487 kg	Heliocentric	NASA	Success
232	Asteroid orbiter							
233	February 24, 1996; 11:24	Delta II 7925-10	VAFB SLC-2W	Polar	1,300 kg	Geocentric	NASA	Success
233	Earth observation satellite							
234	March 28, 1996; 00:21	Delta II 7925	CCAFS LC-17B	USA-117 (GPS IIA-16)	1,816 kg	MEO	US Air Force	Success
234	Navigation satellite							
235	April 24, 1996; 12:27	Delta II 7920-10	VAFB SLC-2W	MSX	2,700 kg	Geocentric	BMDO	Success
235	Infra-red telescope							
236	May 24, 1996; 01:10	Delta II 7925	CCAFS LC-17B	Galaxy 9	700 kg	GSO	PanAmSat / Intelsat	Success
236	Communications satellite							
237	July 16, 1996; 00:50	Delta II 7925	CCAFS LC-17A	USA-126 (GPS IIA-17)	1,816 kg	MEO	US Air Force	Success
237	Navigation satellite							
238	September 12, 1996; 08:49	Delta II 7925	CCAFS LC-17A	USA-128 (GPS IIA-18)	1,816 kg	MEO	US Air Force	Success
238	Navigation satellite							
239	November 7, 1996; 17:00	Delta II 7925	CCAFS LC-17A	Mars Global Surveyor	1,030.5 kg	Heliocentric	NASA	Success
239	Mars orbiter							
240	December 4, 1996; 06:58	Delta II 7925	CCAFS LC-17B	Mars Pathfinder	264 kg	Heliocentric	NASA	Success
240	Mars lander and rover							

=== 1997 ===
There were 11 Thor missiles launched in 1997. 10 of the 11 launches were successful, giving a 90.9% success rate.

Flight No.	Date / time (UTC)	Rocket, Configuration	Launch site	Payload	Payload mass	Orbit	Customer	Launch outcome
241	January 17, 1997; 16:28	Delta II 7925-9.5	CCAFS LC-17A	GPS IIR-1	2,030 kg	Planned: MEO	US Air Force	Failure
241	Exploded 13 seconds after launch due to SRB failure. Navigation satellite							
242	May 5, 1997; 14:55	Delta II 7920-10C	VAFB SLC-2	MS-1		LEO	Iridium	Success
242	Five Iridium satellites							
243	May 20, 1997; 22:39	Delta II 7925-9.5	CCAFS LC-17A	Telenor Thor II	1,467 kg	GTO	Telenor	Success
243	Hughes HS 376 satellite							
244	July 9, 1997; 13:04	Delta II 7920-10C	VAFB SLC-2W	MS-2		LEO	Iridium	Success
244	Five Iridium satellites							
245	July 23, 1997; 03:43	Delta II 7925-9.5	CCAFS LC-17A	USA-132 (GPS IIR-2)	2,032 kg	MEO	US Air Force	Success
245	Navigation satellite							
246	August 21, 1997; 00:38	Delta II 7920-10C	VAFB SLC-2W	MS-3		LEO	Iridium	Success
246	Five Iridium satellites							
247	August 25, 1997; 14:39	Delta II 7920-8	CCAFS LC-17A	Advanced Composition Explorer (ACE)	562 kg	Heliocentric	NASA	Success
247	Solar wind and cosmic-ray research							
248	September 27, 1997; 01:23	Delta II 7920-10C	VAFB SLC-2W	MS-4		LEO	Iridium	Success
248	Five Iridium satellites							
249	November 6, 1997; 00:30	Delta II 7925	CCAFS LC-17A	USA-134 (GPS IIA-19)	2,032 kg	MEO	US Air Force	Success
249	Navigation satellite							
250	November 9, 1997; 01:34	Delta II 7920-10C	VAFB SLC-2W	MS-5		LEO	Iridium	Success
250	Five Iridium satellites							
251	December 20, 1997; 13:16	Delta II 7920-10C	VAFB SLC-2W	MS-6		LEO	Iridium	Success
251	Five Iridium satellites							

=== 1998 ===
There were 13 Thor missiles launched in 1998. 12 of the 13 launches were successful, giving a 92.3% success rate.

Flight No.	Date / time (UTC)	Rocket, Configuration	Launch site	Payload	Payload mass	Orbit	Customer	Launch outcome
252	January 10, 1998; 00:32	Delta II 7925-9.5	CCAFS SLC-17B	Skynet 4D			Astrium Services	Success
253	February 14, 1998; 14:34	Delta II 7420-10C	CCAFS SLC-17A	Globalstar-1	550 kg	LEO	Globalstar	Success
253	Four SS/L satellites							
254	February 18, 1998; 13:58	Delta II 7920-10C	VAFB SLC-2W	MS-7		LEO	Iridium	Success
254	Five Iridium satellites							
255	March 30, 1998; 06:02	Delta II 7920-10C	VAFB SLC-2W	MS-8		LEO	Iridium	Success
255	Five Iridium satellites							
256	April 24, 1998; 22:38	Delta II 7420-10C	CCAFS SLC-17A	Globalstar-2	550 kg	LEO	Globalstar	Success
256	Four SS/L satellites							
257	May 17, 1998; 21:16	Delta II 7920-10C	VAFB SLC-2W	MS-9		LEO	Iridium	Success
257	Five Iridium satellites							
258	June 10, 1998; 00:35	Delta II 7925-9.5	CCAFS SLC-17A	Thor III		GEO	Telenor	Success
259	August 27, 1998; 01:17	Delta III 8930	CCAFS SLC-17B	Galaxy 10	700 kg	GTO	PanAmSat / Intelsat	Failure
259	Maiden flight of Delta III, Destroyed by range safety after control problems and depletion of hydraulic fluid, Communications satellite							
260	September 8, 1998; 21:13	Delta II 7920-10C	VAFB SLC-2W	MS-10		LEO	Iridium	Success
260	Five Iridium satellites							
261	October 24, 1998; 12:08	Delta II 7326	CCAFS SLC-17A	Deep Space 1	373 kg	Heliocentric	NASA	Success
261	Satellite Technology							
262	November 6, 1998; 13:37	Delta II 7920-10C	VAFB SLC-2W	MS-11		LEO	Iridium	Success
262	Five Iridium satellites							
263	November 22, 1998; 23:54	Delta II 7925-9.5	CCAFS SLC-17B	BONUM-1				Success
264	December 11, 1998; 18:45	Delta II 7425	CCAFS SLC-17A	Mars Climate Orbiter	338 kg	Heliocentric	NASA	Success
264	Payload later failed, Mars orbiter							

=== 1999 ===
There were 11 Thor missiles launched in 1999. 10 of the 11 launches were successful, giving a 90.9% success rate.

Flight No.	Date / time (UTC)	Rocket, Configuration	Launch site	Payload	Payload mass	Orbit	Customer	Launch outcome
265	January 3, 1999; 20:21	Delta II 7425	CCAFS SLC-17B	Mars Polar Lander	290 kg	Heliocentric	NASA	Success
265	Payload later failed, Mars lander							
266	February 7, 1999; 21:04	Delta II 7426	CCAFS SLC-17A	Stardust	305.397 kg	Heliocentric	NASA	Success
266	Comet probe							
267	February 23, 1999; 10:29	Delta II 7920-10	VAFB SLC-2W	ARGOS (P91-1 ARGOS), Ørsted and SUNSAT	2,450 kg	Polar orbit	AFRL / NRL / STP	Success
267	At a mission cost of $220M, ARGOS, with its nine payloads, was the USAF's largest R&D mission. Both Ørsted and SUNSAT were their respective countries first satellites. Research and development, scientific							
268	April 15, 1999; 18:32	Delta II 7920-10	VAFB SLC-2W	Landsat 7	2,200 kg	SSO	NASA	Success
269	May 5, 1999; 01:00	Delta III 8930	CCAFS SLC-17B	Orion 3	4,300 kg	GTO	Loral	Failure
269	Second stage engine failure. Payload placed into LEO, Communications satellite							
270	June 10, 1999; 13:48	Delta II 7420-10C	CCAFS SLC-17B	Globalstar 3	550 kg	LEO	Globalstar	Success
271	June 24, 1999; 15:44	Delta II 7320-10	CCAFS SLC-17A	FUSE	1,360 kg	LEO	NASA	Success
271	Space telescope							
272	July 10, 1999; 08:45	Delta II 7420-10C	CCAFS SLC-17B	Globalstar 4	550 kg	LEO	Globalstar	Success
273	July 25, 1999; 07:46	Delta II 7420-10C	CCAFS SLC-17A	Globalstar 5	550 kg	LEO	Globalstar	Success
274	August 17, 1999; 04:37	Delta II 7420-10C	CCAFS SLC-17B	Globalstar 6	550 kg	LEO	Globalstar	Success
275	October 7, 1999; 12:51	Delta II 7925-9.5	CCAFS SLC-17A	USA-145 (GPS IIR-3)	2,032 kg	MEO	US Air Force	Success
275	Navigation satellite							
