= USA-206 =

American navigation satellite used for GPS

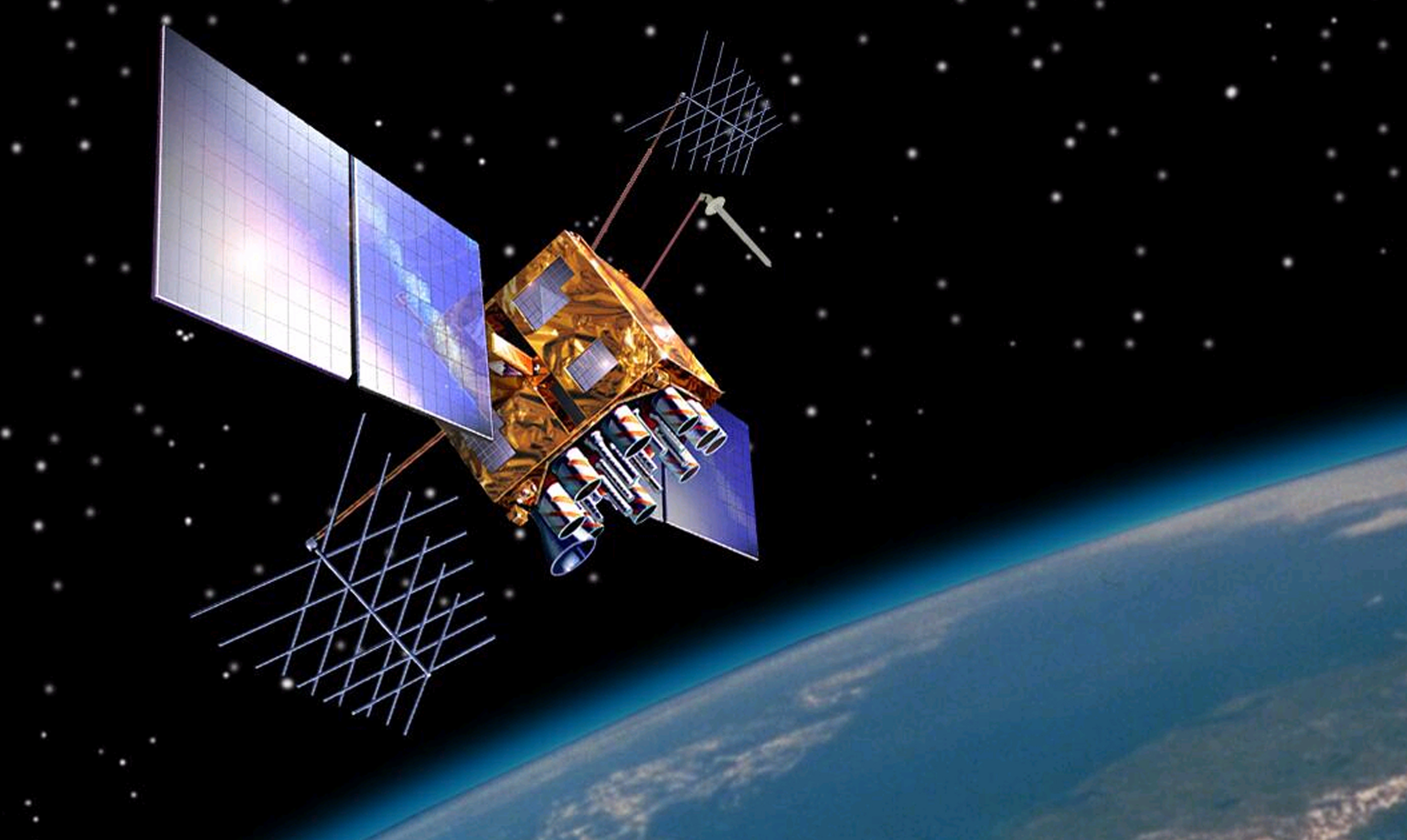
- Artist's impression of a GPS IIRM satellite in orbit
- Mission type: Navigation
- Operator: US Air Force
- COSPAR ID: 2009-043A
- SATCAT no.: 35752
- Mission duration: 10 years (planned)

Spacecraft properties
- Spacecraft type: GPS Block IIRM
- Bus: AS-4000
- Manufacturer: Lockheed Martin
- Launch mass: 2,032 kilograms (4,480 lb)

Start of mission
- Launch date: 17 August 2009, 10:35:00 UTC
- Rocket: Delta II 7925-9.5, D343
- Launch site: Cape Canaveral SLC-17A
- Contractor: ULA

Orbital parameters
- Reference system: Geocentric
- Regime: Medium Earth (Semi-synchronous)
- Perigee altitude: 20,200 kilometers (12,600 mi)
- Apogee altitude: 20,200 kilometers (12,600 mi)
- Inclination: 55 degrees
- Period: 12 hours

USA-206, also GPS SVN-50, PRN-05 and NAVSTAR 64 and known before launch as GPS IIR-21, GPS IIRM-8 or GPS IIR-21(M), is an American navigation satellite that forms part of the Navstar Global Positioning System. It was the twenty-first and last Block IIR GPS satellite to be launched and the eighth to use the modernized IIRM configuration.

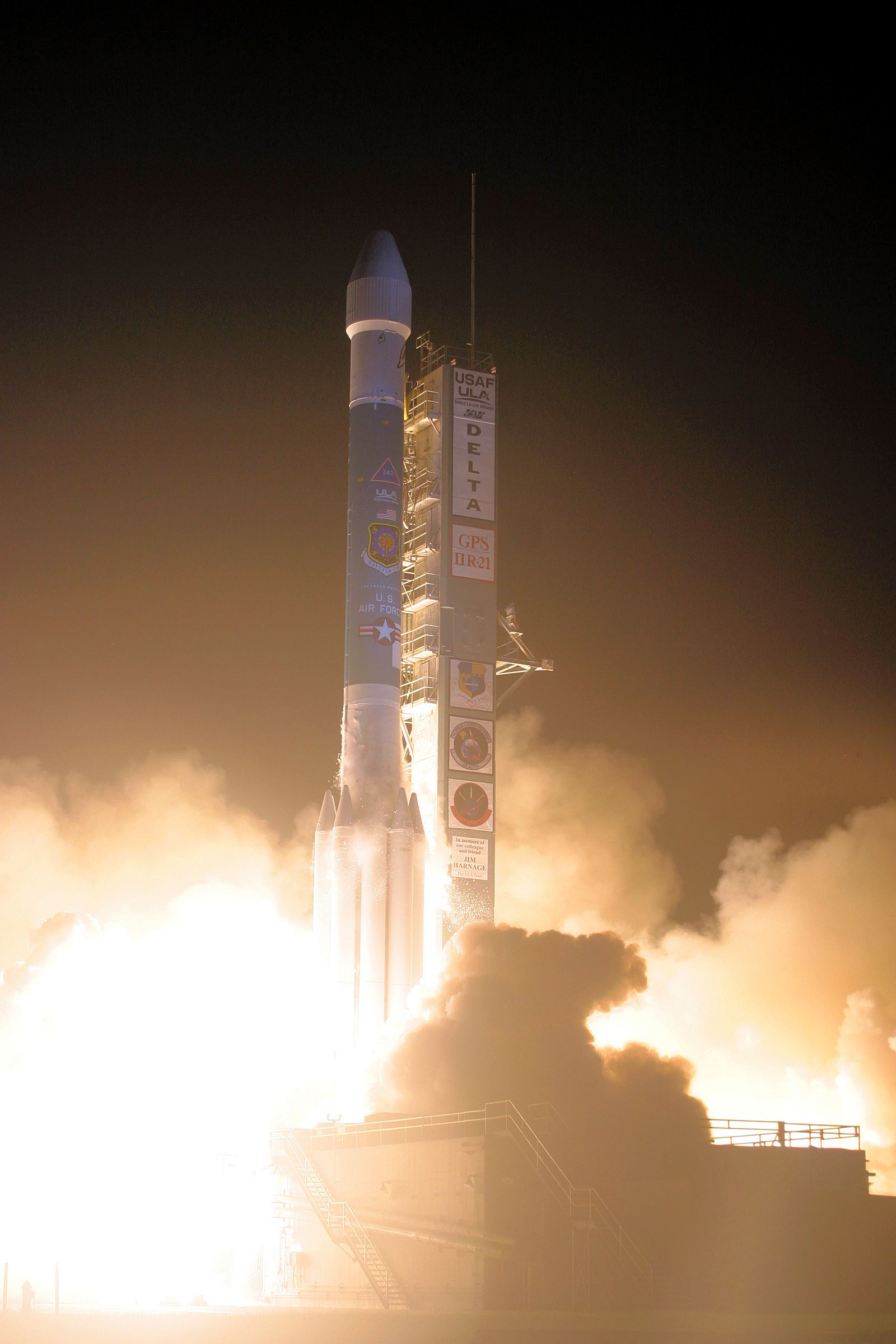
Launch of USA-206

GPS IIR-21 was built by Lockheed Martin, based on the AS-4000 satellite bus, with the navigation payload being built by ITT. It was launched by a United Launch Alliance Delta II rocket, using the 7925-9.5 configuration, on 17 August 2009 at 10:35 GMT. It was the last spacecraft to launch from Space Launch Complex 17A at the Cape Canaveral Air Force Station, a launch pad which was first used in August 1957 for test flights of the PGM-17 Thor missile. It is also the final flight of an AS-4000 bus, the final GPS launch on a Delta II, and the final Delta II launch to be overseen by the US Air Force.

Following separation from its carrier rocket, GPS IIR-21 received its USA designation, USA-206. It was deployed into a transfer orbit, from which raised itself to a semi-synchronous medium Earth orbit on 19 August, using an onboard Star 37FM apogee motor. It is a 2,032-kilogram (4,480 lb) satellite, and is expected to operate for at least ten years. Once it had completed on-orbit testing, it began covering Slot 3 of Plane E of the GPS constellation, replacing USA-126, or GPS IIA-26, which was launched in July 1996. It was declared operational on 27 August 2009.
