= USA-38 =

American navigation satellite used for GPS

- Names: Navstar 2-02; GPS II-2; GPS SVN-13
- Mission type: Navigation
- Operator: U.S. Air Force
- COSPAR ID: 1989-044A
- SATCAT no.: 20061
- Mission duration: 7.5 years (planned); 15 years (achieved)

Spacecraft properties
- Spacecraft: GPS II
- Spacecraft type: GPS Block II
- Manufacturer: Rockwell International
- Launch mass: 840 kg (1,850 lb)
- Dimensions: 5.3 m (17 ft) of long
- Power: 710 watts

Start of mission
- Launch date: 10 June 1989, 22:19 UTC
- Rocket: Delta II 6925-9.5 (Delta D185)
- Launch site: Cape Canaveral, LC-17A
- Contractor: McDonnell Douglas
- Entered service: July 1989

End of mission
- Deactivated: 12 February 2004

Orbital parameters
- Reference system: Geocentric orbit
- Regime: Medium Earth orbit (Semi-synchronous)
- Slot: B3 (slot 3 plane B)
- Perigee altitude: 19,967 km (12,407 mi)
- Apogee altitude: 20,395 km (12,673 mi)
- Inclination: 54.5°
- Period: 717.92 minutes

USA-38, also known as GPS II-2 and GPS SVN-13, was an American navigation satellite which formed part of the Global Positioning System. It was the second of nine Block II GPS satellites to be launched, which were the first operational GPS satellites to be launched.

== Background ==
It was part of the 21-satellite Global Positioning System (GPS) Block II series that provides precise position data (accurate to within 16 m) to military and civilian users worldwide. Its signals could be received on devices as small as a telephone. The GPS II satellites, built by Rockwell International for the Air Force Space Systems Division, each have a 7.5-year design life. The Air Force intends to launch a GPS II every two to three months until the constellation of 21 operational satellites and three spares is aloft. The GPS Block II joins seven operational Block 1 satellites.

== Launch ==
USA-38 was launched at 22:19 UTC on 10 June 1989, atop a Delta II launch vehicle, flight number D185, flying in the 6925-9.5 configuration. The launch took place from Launch Complex 17A (LC-17A) at the Cape Canaveral Air Force Station (CCAFS), and placed USA-38 into a transfer orbit. The satellite raised itself into medium Earth orbit using a Star-37XFP apogee motor.

== Mission ==
On 11 July 1989, USA-38 was in an orbit with a perigee of 19,967 km (12,407 mi), an apogee of 20,395 km (12,673 mi), a period of 717.92 minutes, and 54.5° of inclination to the equator. It operated in slot 3 of plane B of the GPS constellation. The satellite had a mass of 840 kg (1,850 lb), and generated 710 watts of power. It had a design life of 7.5 years, and was deactivated on 12 February 2004.
