= USA-79 =

American navigation satellite used for GPS

- Names: Navstar 2A-03; GPS IIA-3; GPS II-12; GPS SVN-25
- Mission type: Navigation
- Operator: U.S. Air Force
- COSPAR ID: 1992-009A
- SATCAT no.: 21890
- Mission duration: 7.5 years (planned); 17.75 years (achieved)

Spacecraft properties
- Spacecraft: GPS-IIA
- Spacecraft type: GPS Block IIA
- Manufacturer: Rockwell International
- Launch mass: 840 kg (1,850 lb)
- Dimensions: 5.3 m (17 ft) of long
- Power: 710 watts

Start of mission
- Launch date: 23 February 1992, 22:29:00 UTC
- Rocket: Delta II 7925-9.5 (Delta D207)
- Launch site: Cape Canaveral, LC-17B
- Contractor: McDonnell Douglas
- Entered service: 27 March 1992

End of mission
- Disposal: Graveyard orbit
- Deactivated: 18 December 2009

Orbital parameters
- Reference system: Geocentric orbit
- Regime: Medium Earth orbit (Semi-synchronous)
- Slot: A2 (slot 2 plane A)
- Perigee altitude: 19,913 km (12,373 mi)
- Apogee altitude: 20,318 km (12,625 mi)
- Inclination: 54.70°
- Period: 714.70 minutes

USA-79, also known as GPS IIA-3, GPS II-12 and GPS SVN-25, was an American navigation satellite which formed part of the Global Positioning System. It was the third of nineteen Block IIA GPS satellites to be launched.

== Background ==
Global Positioning System (GPS) was developed by the U.S. Department of Defense to provide all-weather round-the-clock navigation capabilities for military ground, sea, and air forces. Since its implementation, GPS has also become an integral asset in numerous civilian applications and industries around the globe, including recreational uses (e.g., boating, aircraft, hiking), corporate vehicle fleet tracking, and surveying. GPS employs 24 spacecraft in 20,200 km circular orbits inclined at 55.0°. These vehicles are placed in 6 orbit planes with four operational satellites in each plane.

GPS Block 2 was the operational system, following the demonstration system composed of Block 1 (Navstar 1 - 11) spacecraft. These spacecraft were 3-axis stabilized, nadir pointing using reaction wheels. Dual solar arrays supplied 710 watts of power. They used S-band (SGLS) communications for control and telemetry and Ultra high frequency (UHF) cross-link between spacecraft. The payload consisted of two L-band navigation signals at 1575.42 MHz (L1) and 1227.60 MHz (L2). Each spacecraft carried 2 rubidium and 2 Cesium clocks and nuclear detonation detection sensors. Built by Rockwell Space Systems for the U.S. Air force, the spacecraft measured 5.3 m across with solar panels deployed and had a design life of 7.5 years.

== Launch ==
USA-79 was launched at 22:29:00 UTC on 23 February 1992, atop a Delta II launch vehicle, flight number D207, flying in the 7925-9.5 configuration. The launch took place from Launch Complex 17B (LC-17B) at the Cape Canaveral Air Force Station (CCAFS), and placed USA-79 into a transfer orbit. The satellite raised itself into medium Earth orbit using a Star-37XFP apogee motor.

== Mission ==
On 27 March 1992, USA-79 was in an orbit with a perigee of 19,913 km (12,373 mi), an apogee of 20,318 km (12,625 mi), a period of 714.70 minutes, and 54.70° of inclination to the equator. It had PRN 25, and operated in slot 2 of plane A of the GPS constellation. The satellite had a mass of 840 kg (1,850 lb). It had a design life of 7.5 years, and ceased operations on 18 December 2009.
