= USA-66 =

American navigation satellite used for GPS

- Names: Navstar 2A-01; GPS IIA-1; GPS II-10; GPS SVN-23
- Mission type: Navigation
- Operator: U.S. Air Force
- COSPAR ID: 1990-103A
- SATCAT no.: 20959
- Mission duration: 7.5 years (planned); 25 years (achieved)

Spacecraft properties
- Spacecraft: GPS IIA
- Spacecraft type: GPS Block IIA
- Manufacturer: Rockwell International
- Launch mass: 840 kg (1,850 lb)
- Dimensions: 5.3 m (17 ft) of long
- Power: 710 watts

Start of mission
- Launch date: 26 November 1990, 21:39:01 UTC
- Rocket: Delta II 7925-9.5 (Delta D201)
- Launch site: Cape Canaveral, LC-17A
- Contractor: McDonnell Douglas
- Entered service: 30 December 1990

End of mission
- Disposal: Graveyard orbit
- Deactivated: 25 January 2016

Orbital parameters
- Reference system: Geocentric orbit
- Regime: Medium Earth orbit (Semi-synchronous)
- Slot: E5 (slot 5 plane E)
- Perigee altitude: 19,935 km (12,387 mi)
- Apogee altitude: 20,279 km (12,601 mi)
- Inclination: 54.8°
- Period: 714.8 minutes

USA-66, also known as GPS IIA-1, GPS II-10 and GPS SVN-23, was an American navigation satellite which formed part of the Global Positioning System. It was the first of nineteen Block IIA GPS satellites to be launched, and was the oldest GPS satellite still in operation until its decommissioning on 25 January 2016.

== Background ==
Global Positioning System (GPS) was developed by the U.S. Department of Defense to provide all-weather round-the-clock navigation capabilities for military ground, sea, and air forces. Since its implementation, GPS has also become an integral asset in numerous civilian applications and industries around the globe, including recreational used (e.g., boating, aircraft, hiking), corporate vehicle fleet tracking, and surveying. GPS employs 24 spacecraft in 20,200 km circular orbits inclined at 55.0°. These vehicles are placed in 6 orbit planes with four operational satellites in each plane.

GPS Block 2 was the operational system, following the demonstration system composed of Block 1 (Navstar 1 - 11) spacecraft. These spacecraft were 3-axis stabilized, nadir pointing using reaction wheels. Dual solar arrays supplied 710 watts of power. They used S-band (SGLS) communications for control and telemetry and Ultra high frequency (UHF) cross-link between spacecraft. The payload consisted of two L-band navigation signals at 1575.42 MHz (L1) and 1227.60 MHz (L2). Each spacecraft carried 2 rubidium and 2 Cesium clocks and nuclear detonation detection sensors. Built by Rockwell Space Systems for the U.S. Air force, the spacecraft measured 5.3 m across with solar panels deployed and had a design life of 7.5 years.

== Launch ==
USA-66 was launched at 21:39:01 UTC on 26 November 1990, atop a Delta II launch vehicle, flight number D201, flying in the 7925-9.5 configuration. The launch took place from Launch Complex 17A (LC-17A) at the Cape Canaveral Air Force Station (CCAFS), and placed USA-66 into a transfer orbit. The satellite raised itself into medium Earth orbit using a Star-37XFP apogee motor.

== Mission ==
On 30 December 1990, USA-66 was in an orbit with a perigee of 19,935 km (12,387 mi), an apogee of 20,279 km (12,601 mi), a period of 714.8 minutes, and 54.8° of inclination to the equator. It was initially given PRN 23, which it used until its retirement in February 2004; however, it was subsequently reactivated broadcasting PRN 32 and in February 2008 it rejoined the operational constellation.

It is located in slot 5 of plane E of the GPS constellation. The satellite has a mass of 840 kg (1,850 lb). It had a design life of 7.5 years, but remained in service for over 25 years.

On 25 January 2016, USA-66 was decommissioned, and removed from the GPS constellation. When engineers took it offline, its disappearance triggered a software bug that left the timing of 15 of the remaining GPS satellites off by 13.7 microseconds, causing widespread GPS disruptions.
