= USA-50 =

American navigation satellite used for GPS

- Names: Navstar 2-06; GPS II-6; GPS SVN-18
- Mission type: Navigation
- Operator: U.S. Air Force
- COSPAR ID: 1990-008A
- SATCAT no.: 20452
- Mission duration: 7.5 years (planned); 10.5 years (achieved)

Spacecraft properties
- Spacecraft: GPS II
- Spacecraft type: GPS Block II
- Manufacturer: Rockwell International
- Launch mass: 840 kg (1,850 lb)
- Dimensions: 5.3 m (17 ft) of long
- Power: 710 watts

Start of mission
- Launch date: 24 January 1990, 22:55:01 UTC
- Rocket: Delta II 6925-9.5 (Delta D191)
- Launch site: Cape Canaveral, LC-17A
- Contractor: McDonnell Douglas
- Entered service: February 1990

End of mission
- Deactivated: 18 August 2000

Orbital parameters
- Reference system: Geocentric orbit
- Regime: Medium Earth orbit (Semi-synchronous)
- Slot: ?
- Perigee altitude: 20,087 km (12,481 mi)
- Apogee altitude: 20,275 km (12,598 mi)
- Inclination: 54.6°
- Period: 717.92 minutes

USA-50, also known as GPS II-6 and GPS SVN-18, was an American navigation satellite which formed part of the Global Positioning System. It was the sixth of nine Block II GPS satellites to be launched, which were the first operational GPS satellites to fly.

== Background ==
It was part of the 21-satellite Global Positioning System (GPS) Block II series that provides precise position data (accurate to within 16 m) to military and civilian users worldwide. Its signals could be received on devices as small as a telephone. The GPS II satellites, built by Rockwell International for the Air Force Space Systems Division, each have a 7.5-year design life. The Air Force intends to launch a GPS II every 2 to 3 months until the constellation of 21 operational satellite and 3 spares is aloft. The GPS Block II join 7 operational Block 1 satellites.

== Launch ==
USA-50 was launched at 22:55:01 UTC on 24 January 1990, atop a Delta II launch vehicle, flight number D191, flying in the 6925-9.5 configuration. The launch took place from Launch Complex 17A (LC-17A) at the Cape Canaveral Air Force Station (CCAFS), and placed USA-50 into a transfer orbit. The satellite raised itself into medium Earth orbit using a Star-37XFP apogee motor.

== Mission ==
On 25 February 1990, USA-50 was in an orbit with a perigee of 20,087 km (12,481 mi), an apogee of 20,275 km (12,598 mi), a period of 717.92 minutes, and 54.6° of inclination to the equator. The satellite had a mass of 840 kg (1,850 lb), and generated 710 watts of power. It had a design life of 7.5 years, and was retired from service on 18 August 2000.
