= ARGOS (satellite) =

American scientific satellite

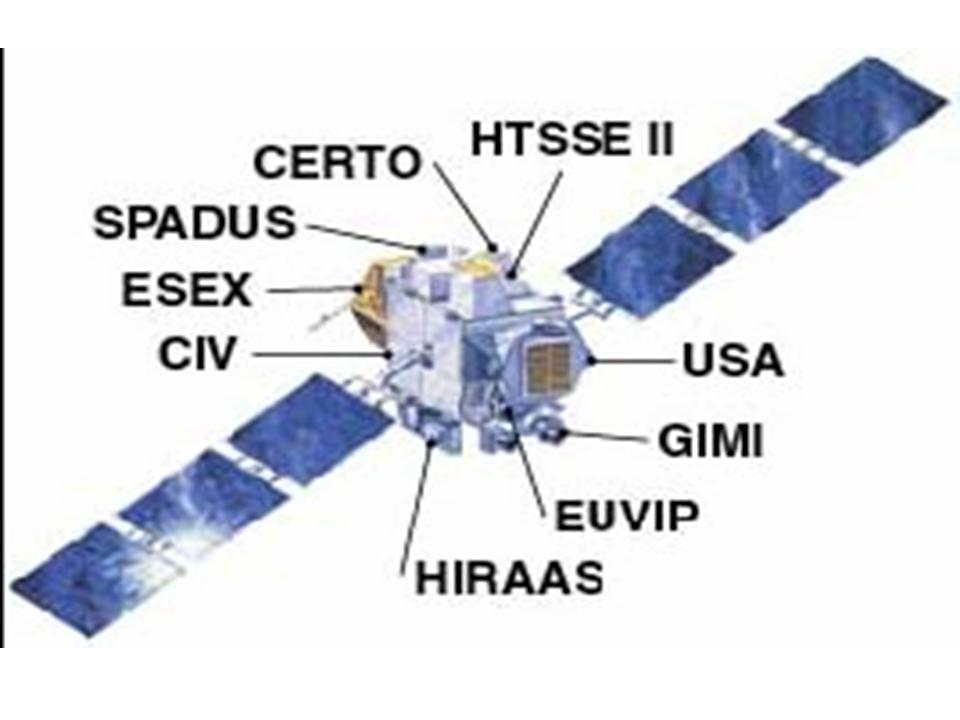
- Artist's rendition of ARGOS
- Mission type: Space environment
- Operator: AFRL; NRL; STP
- COSPAR ID: 1999-008A
- SATCAT no.: 25634
- Mission duration: 3 years (planned); 4.5 years (achieved)

Spacecraft properties
- Bus: ARGOS
- Manufacturer: Boeing
- Launch mass: 2,450 kg (5,400 lb)

Start of mission
- Launch date: 23 February 1999, 10:29:55 UTC
- Rocket: Delta II 7920-10
- Launch site: Vandenberg, SLC-2W
- Contractor: Boeing

End of mission
- Last contact: 31 July 2003

Orbital parameters
- Reference system: Geocentric orbit
- Regime: Sun-synchronous orbit
- Perigee altitude: 828 km (514 mi)
- Apogee altitude: 842 km (523 mi)
- Inclination: 98.78°
- Period: 101.47 minutes
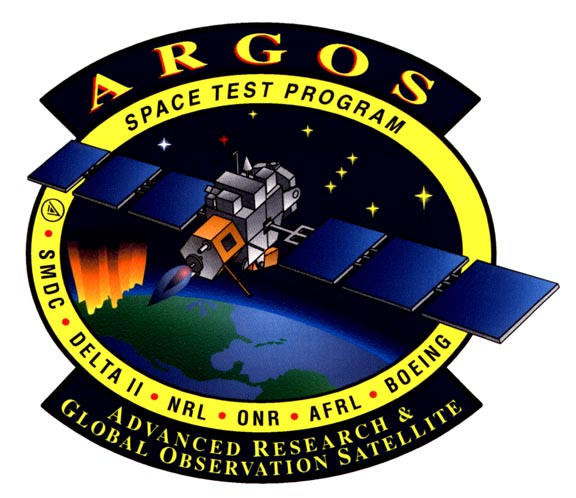
- ARGOS mission patch

The Advanced Research and Global Observation Satellite (ARGOS) was launched on 23 February 1999 carrying nine payloads for research and development missions by nine separate researchers. The mission terminated on 31 July 2003.

ARGOS was launched from SLC-2W, Vandenberg Air Force Base, California, atop a Boeing Delta II (7920-10) launch vehicle. Construction of the spacecraft bus and integration of the satellite's payloads was accomplished by Boeing at their Seal Beach, California facility. The program was funded and led by the DoD's Space Test Program (STP) as mission P91-1 (the first STP mission contract awarded in 1991).

The US$220 million mission was operated by Air Force Space Command's Space and Missile Systems Center's Test and Evaluation Directorate (then Space Development and Test Wing, now SMC's Advanced Systems and Development Directorate) from their RDT&E Support Complex (RSC) at Kirtland Air Force Base, New Mexico. ARGOS was the first mission operated 100% from the new state-of-the-art, commercial-off-the-shelf Kirtland facility; all previous SMC satellite missions had been operated in total or at least in part from the preceding center at Onizuka Air Force Station, California.

== Mission ==
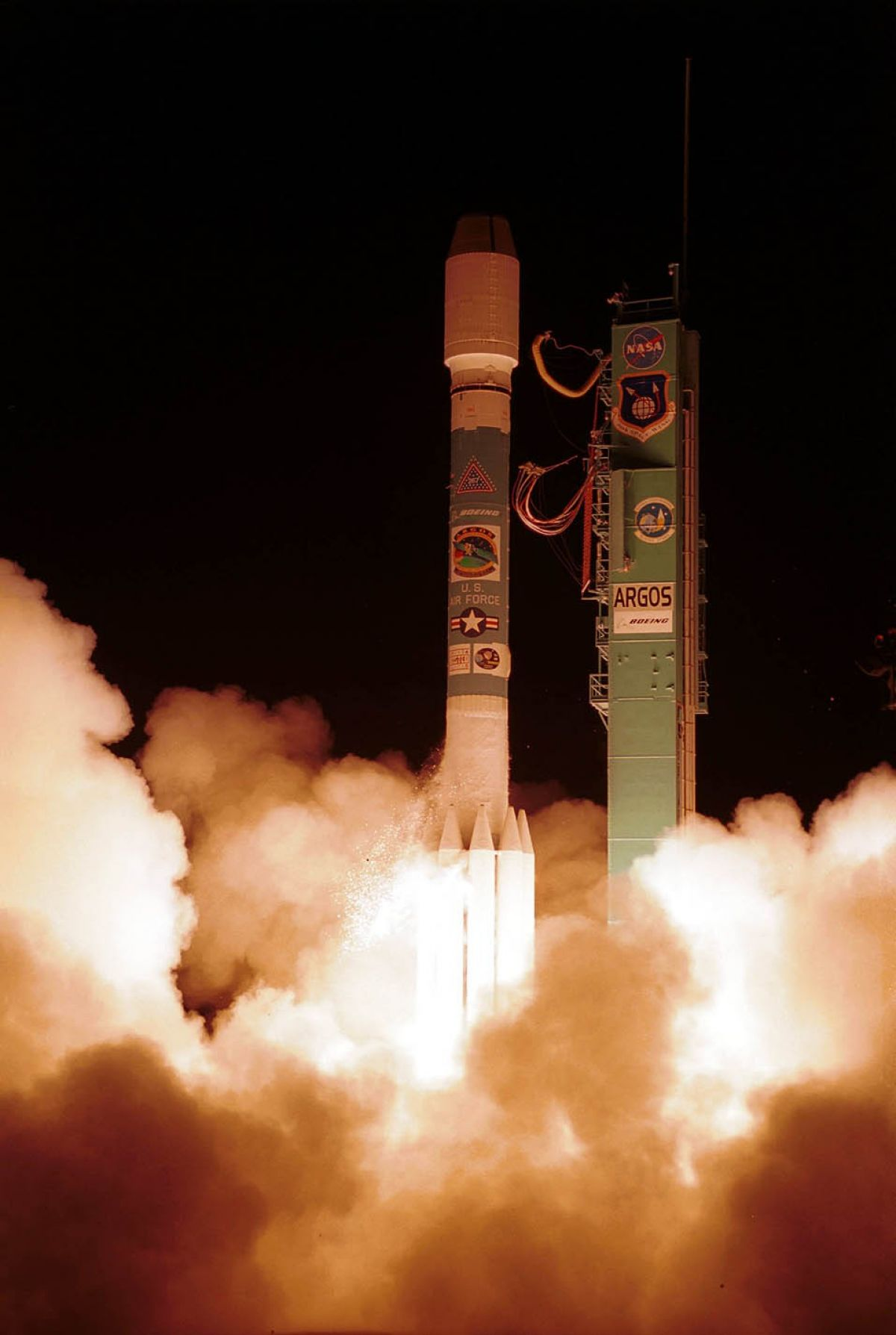
Launch of ARGOS, February 23, 1999.

ARGOS (also called STP mission P91-1) was a DoD research and development satellite mission, managed by the Space and Missile Systems Center Space Division at Kirtland AFB (SMC/TE), Albuquerque, NM. It was part of the USAF Space Test Program (STP) with the objective to demonstrate several new space technologies and to fly payloads for global Earth sensing and celestial observations.

The ARGOS had a design life of three years and was part of the DoD Space Test Program (STP), which supports the Air Force, Army, Navy, BMDO (now MDA), NASA, and various international space agencies. The nine ARGOS payloads, addressing more than 30 research objectives, conducted upper atmospheric observations and technology demonstrations. These included sensor technology for the International Space Station (ISS), as well as three high-priority ultraviolet imaging experiments and an X-ray sensor. The remaining experiments investigate ion propulsion, gas ionization physics, plume detection capabilities, and orbital debris. As part of DOD STP, ARGOS served the need to fly Department of Defense payloads that cannot be flown on the Space Shuttle or aboard small launch vehicles due to complexity, size, mission duration, or other constraints. The Naval Research Laboratory (NRL), U.S. Army Space and Strategic Defense Command, Air Force Research Laboratory, and Office of Naval Research have provided payloads for the ARGOS mission.

Per the Kirtland AFB mission control center, "As of 1500 Zulu on 31 July 2003, support of all ARGOS operations has been terminated. Decaying inertial reference units has led to a tumble of the aircraft. As a result, communications with the spacecraft have been lost".

The satellite was designed to operate in a Sun-synchronous orbit and many of the payloads required unique Sun-angles, and so the orbit was creatively designed by Robert Cleave to operate without the need for an on-board propulsion subsystem, which was later identified as a key winning strategy.

== Payloads ==
ARGOS was built at Boeing's Seal Beach California facility and, at the time, was the largest and most sophisticated research and development satellite that Boeing had ever developed for the U.S. Air Force.

The satellite included a range of sensors and experiments that were sponsored and furnished by various organizations within the U.S. space commununity. The selection of experiments was adjudicated through the DoD Selective Experiments Review Board (SERB) process. Experiments and sponsors are identified below:

- CERTO - Coherent Electromagnetic Radio Tomography Experiment (1996-18/NRL) instrumentation: developed by NRL's Plasma Physics Division, consists of a stable radio beacon transmitter on the satellite and a chain of receivers on the ground. Radio transmissions from the CERTO beacon are processed by the ground receivers to produce two-dimensional maps of the electron densities in the ionosphere. The CERTO measurement technique provides images of the ionosphere with 10 km vertical and horizontal resolution. In addition, ionospheric irregularities of 1 km or less in size can be determined by fluctuations in the CERTO radio waves. CERTO can also be used to calibrate the ionospheric densities obtained using the EUV instruments such as HIRAAS, GIMI, and EUVIP on ARGOS. The CERTO radio-based technique has the advantage of higher spatial resolution than provided by the EUV-based techniques, but requires ground-based receivers aligned under the satellite orbit. The two techniques together on the same satellite provide substantial improvements over each technique separately. CERTO principal investigator, Dr. Paul Bernhardt notes that the NRL instruments on ARGOS was the first demonstration combining EUV and radio sensors for enhanced imaging of the ionosphere.
- CIV - Critical Ionization Velocity Experiment (1990-9/AFRL-Kirtland AFB): Release of xenon and carbon dioxide gases from nozzles on the ARGOS orbiting with a velocity of about 7.4 km/s at an altitude of about 800 km is proposed. The releases have been conducted mostly in darkness over the Maui telescope site. The vector sum of the satellite and gas velocities have exceeded the velocity requirement for the critical ionization velocity (CIV) process of xenon. It is feasible that the xenon gas will achieve critical velocity ionization. Ion source and collisional stripping will not occur for the xenon gas and there is no photo-ionization in darkness; ionization processes competing with CIV are absent. Neutral density, ambient magnetic field, and seed ionization effects on the xenon gas CIV will be discussed. Unlike xenon, carbon dioxide will not undergo CIV because of its higher velocity requirement. However, it is feasible that carbon dioxide colliding with the atmospheric species will form excited CO and OH molecules, which will radiate subsequently. Optical, IR, and UV observations on the satellite and at Maui Optical Telescope will provide diagnostic measurements for the experiment.
- ESEX - Electric Propulsion Space Experiment (1990-13/AFRL-Edwards AFB): an effort by the Air Force Research Laboratory's Propulsion Directorate demonstrated a high-powered electric propulsion provided by a 26 kilowatt arcjet. Its performance and interactions with other experiments and spacecraft systems were evaluated. Through the ionizing of ammonia, ESEX's electric propulsion was expected to double the payload-to-orbit capability of current space propulsion systems. The ammonia propellant consumed was four times less than the best performing chemical rocket engine in use at that time. For the team, the best information gathered was the validation that firing the highest powered electric propulsion system in space did not interrupt telemetry or affect other equipment on the spacecraft.
- EUVIP - Extreme Ultraviolet Imaging Photometer Experiment (1990-8/Army Space & Strategic Defense Command): has established the behavior of the upper atmosphere and plasmasphere needed for Army secure communication systems design, prediction of magnetic storms, and characterization of the aurora.
- GIMI - Global Imaging Monitor of the Ionosphere Experiment (1990-19/NRL): will obtain wide-field FUV/EUV images of ionospheric and upper atmospheric emissions simultaneously, covering large areas of the Earth from a low Earth orbit. These images will be used to determine chemical densities [O+, nighttime O2, NO and N2] on a global basis and to detect disturbances in the ionosphere that are caused by auroral activity, gravity waves and foreign materials from meteors, suspected "ice comets", rocket exhausts and chemical releases. In between the atmospheric observations, GIMI will also perform an all-sky survey of stars and celestial diffuse sources at far-ultraviolet wavelengths. The GIMI instrument has two coaligned cameras for simultaneous observations of selected targets. Camera 1, which is sensitive in the 75-110 nm range, will primarily be used for observations of the dayside ionosphere, auroras, and stellar occultations, and for star field surveys. Camera 2 is sensitive in the 131-160 and 131-200 nm far-UV wavelength ranges and will be used for observations of the nightside ionosphere, airglow, stellar occultations, star field surveys, and also gas releases and rocket plumes at night.
- HIRAAS - High Resolution Airglow/Aurora Spectrograph Experiment (1990-5/NRL): is a multi-instrument experiment that will scan the edge of the Earth's atmosphere (called the limb) about every 90 seconds to measure naturally occurring airglow missions in the 50 to 340 nanometer (nm) wavelength range over a wide array of geophysical conditions and at varying local times. The instruments will perform continuous observations over several spectral bands with resolution up to ten times better than with previous experiments. These measurements will be used to infer the composition (O+, N_{2}, O, and O_{2}) and temperature. Data from the HIRAAS experiment will be used to explore new concepts in monitoring space weather from satellites, and to improve high frequency communications and over-the-horizon radar, which rely on propagation through the atmosphere. The measurements will also help researchers assess the long-term effects of the increases of atmospheric greenhouse gases on the upper atmosphere and ionosphere.
- HTSSE II - High Temperature Superconductivity Space Experiment (1992-2/NRL): developed by the Naval Research Laboratory will space qualify superconducting digital subsystems that could offer factors of 100 to 1000 in power reduction - more than ten times higher speed and similar weight reduction, than today's silicon or gallium arsenide (GaAs) based electronics. Spacecraft designers will evaluate the benefits for future systems.
- SPADUS - Space Dust Experiment (1990-33/Office of Naval Research): sponsored by the University of Chicago with funding by the Office of Naval Research, will measure velocity and impact of dust in space orbit.
- USA - Unconventional Stellar Aspect (1990-22/NRL): sponsored by Naval Research Lab, Space Science Division, the USA experiment was designed to observe bright X-ray sources, mostly binary star systems, including a black hole, a neutron star, or a white dwarf, orbiting with a more typical star. In neutron stars, gravity has compressed matter down to densities larger than those found in the nucleus of an atom. In all of these types of binary systems, extraordinarily strong, relativistic gravitational forces and enormous magnetic fields act in concert to produce dramatic phenomena not observable from Earth-based laboratories. In addition to providing valuable new information for astrophysicists and particle physicists, USA has been designed to make significant contributions to applied science, environmental science, and engineering research. It will use X-ray sources to test new approaches to satellite navigation and to conduct the first tomographic survey of Earth's atmosphere. It will also test new concepts for making spacecraft computers more reliable, an approach called fault-tolerant computing. Finally, a unique feature of USA is that photon events are time tagged by reference to an onboard GPS receiver allowing precise absolute time and location determination. USA operated from 1 May 1999, through 16 November 2000.

== Bus characteristics ==
P91-1 ARGOS Mission Book.

- ARGOS Spacecraft mass: 5,491 lb (2,491 kg)
- The ARGOS satellite could generate 2200 watts of electrical power from solar panels
- Data Rates for SV: 4 and 128 kbit/s; Experiments: 1.024, 4.096, and 5 Mbit/s

== Orbit characteristics ==
- Initial: Circular orbit altitude: 455 nmi (851 km), with inclination: 98.725°.
- Final, post second-stage depletion burn: 335 x 459 nautical miles (833 km) orbit inclined at 96.7°.
- Through the ESEX and CIV experiment operations, the mission orbit was lowered over two kilometers.

== Liftoff postponements ==
After about six weeks stacked on the launch pad, and as long for mission crews to report only to replan activities for another night and slightly different time, the rocket and its satellites blasted away from Earth's pull.

- 15 January 1999 - postponed launch 24 hours to complete testing of the link between the spacecraft and the ground telemetry station. "The spacecraft team observed noise intrusion on the telemetry signal sent from the spacecraft to the ground station. The spacecraft team has corrected the problem and validation testing is underway. The 24-hour delay allows the spacecraft team to finalize its testing prior to the launch vehicle upper stage fueling".
- 21 January 1999 - launch postponed due to weather (upper-level winds).
- 22 January 1999 - launch postponed due to weather (upper-level winds).
- 27 January 1999 - launch postponed due to weather (upper-level winds).
- 28 January 1999 - launch postponed — the Boeing launch team determined that a propellant valve on vernier engine number two failed to open on command. This caused the engine shutdown and initiation of the autosafe mechanism on the launch vehicle. During the engine start sequence, the two vernier engines are required to ignite prior to ignition of the main engine. The main engine and two vernier engines were automatically shut down at approximately T-0 when it was detected that one of the vernier engines had failed to ignite. All vehicle safing systems performed as designed and expected.
- 7 February 1999 - launch postponed due to weather (upper-level winds).
- 8 February 1999 - launch postponed due to weather (upper-level winds).
- 12 February 1999 - launch postponed due to weather (upper-level winds).
- 13 February 1999 - launch postponed due to an electrical problem in the first stage of the booster.
- 21 February 1999 - launch postponed due to weather (upper-level winds).
- 23 February 1999 - the rocket lifted off at 10:29 UTC from California's Vandenberg Air Force Base.

== Secondary satellites launched with ARGOS ==
As the launching of the ARGOS satellite did not require the full payload capacity of its launching rocket, Delta II, there was room left in the payload-mass-budget of the launch vehicle and thus two secondary satellites were added to, and launched on, the same rocket on 23 February 1999. NASA sponsored the secondary satellites, Ørsted (SSC #25635) and SUNSAT (SSC #25636), which were the first satellites of their respective countries, Denmark and South Africa.

== See also ==
- List of Delta II launches
