= GPS satellite blocks =

Generations of US navigation satellites

GPS satellite constellation animation

Various Earth orbits to scale; green dash-dot line is medium Earth orbit, a typical GPS orbit.

Animation of GPS satellites' orbits from 15 May 2013 to 6 September 2018 USA-242 · USA-239 · USA-151 · Earth Note: This animation does not reflect actual orbits which are approximately 350 times denser than these.

GPS satellite blocks are the various production generations of the Global Positioning System (GPS) used for satellite navigation. The first satellite in the system, Navstar 1, was launched by the United States Air Force on 22 February 1978. The GPS satellite constellation is now operated by the 2nd Navigation Warfare Squadron (2 NWS) of Mission Delta 31, United States Space Force.

The GPS satellites circle the Earth at an altitude of about 20,000 km (12,427 miles) and complete two full orbits every day.

== Satellites by block ==
Block	Launched	Launch Failures	Testing/ Reserve	Operational	Retired	Manufacturer	Remarks
Block I	11	1	0	0	10	Rockwell International	
Block II	9	0	0	0	9	Rockwell International	One unlaunched prototype
Block IIA	19	0	0	0	19	Rockwell International	
Block IIR	13	1	5	4	3	Lockheed Martin	
Block IIRM	8	0	1	7	0	Lockheed Martin	
Block IIF	12	0	1	11	0	Boeing	
Block III	10	0	1	9	0	Lockheed Martin	
Block IIIF	0	0	0	0	0	Lockheed Martin	
Total	82	2	8	31	41		
As of 24 April 2026

== Block I satellites ==
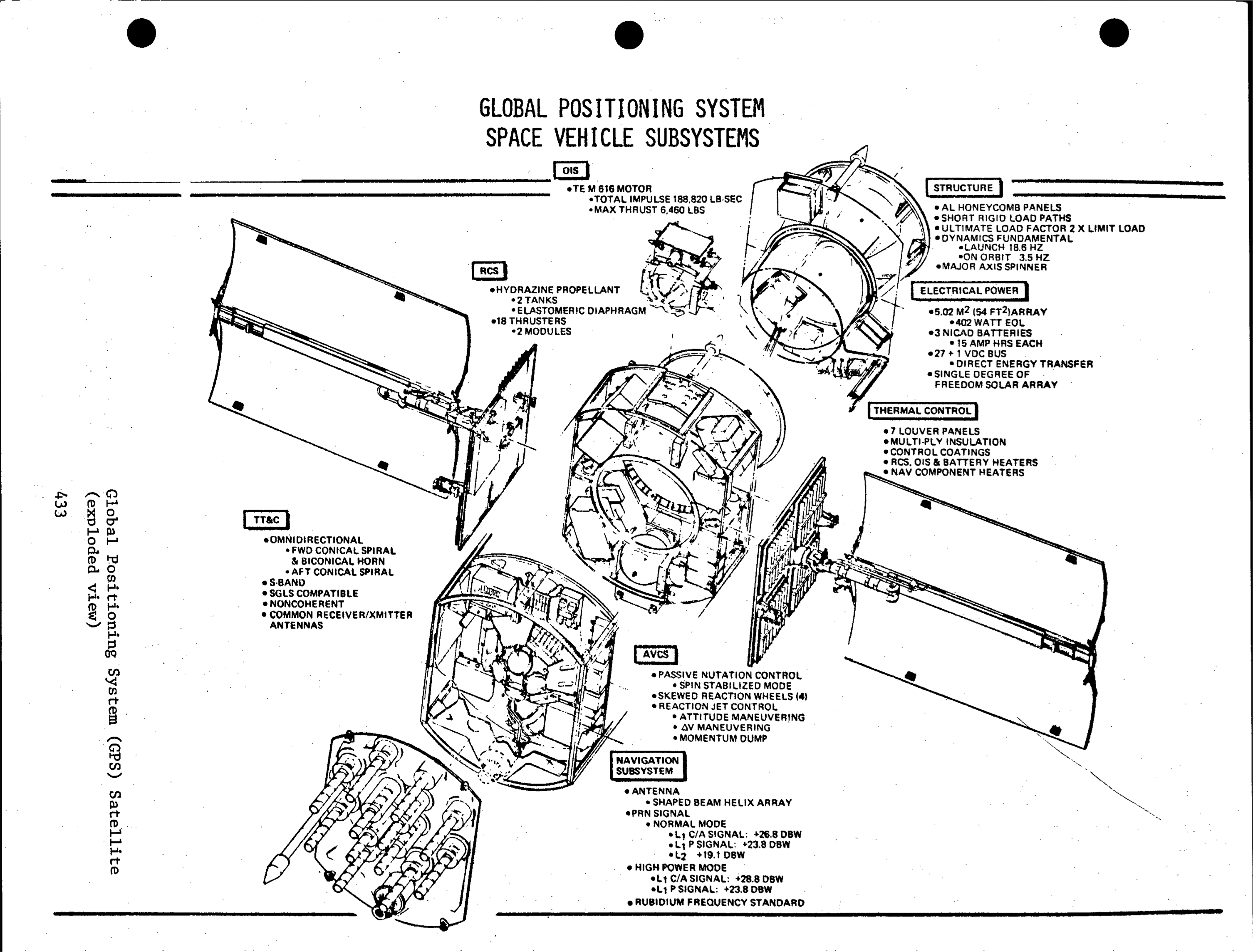
Exploded view of a GPS Block 1 satellite

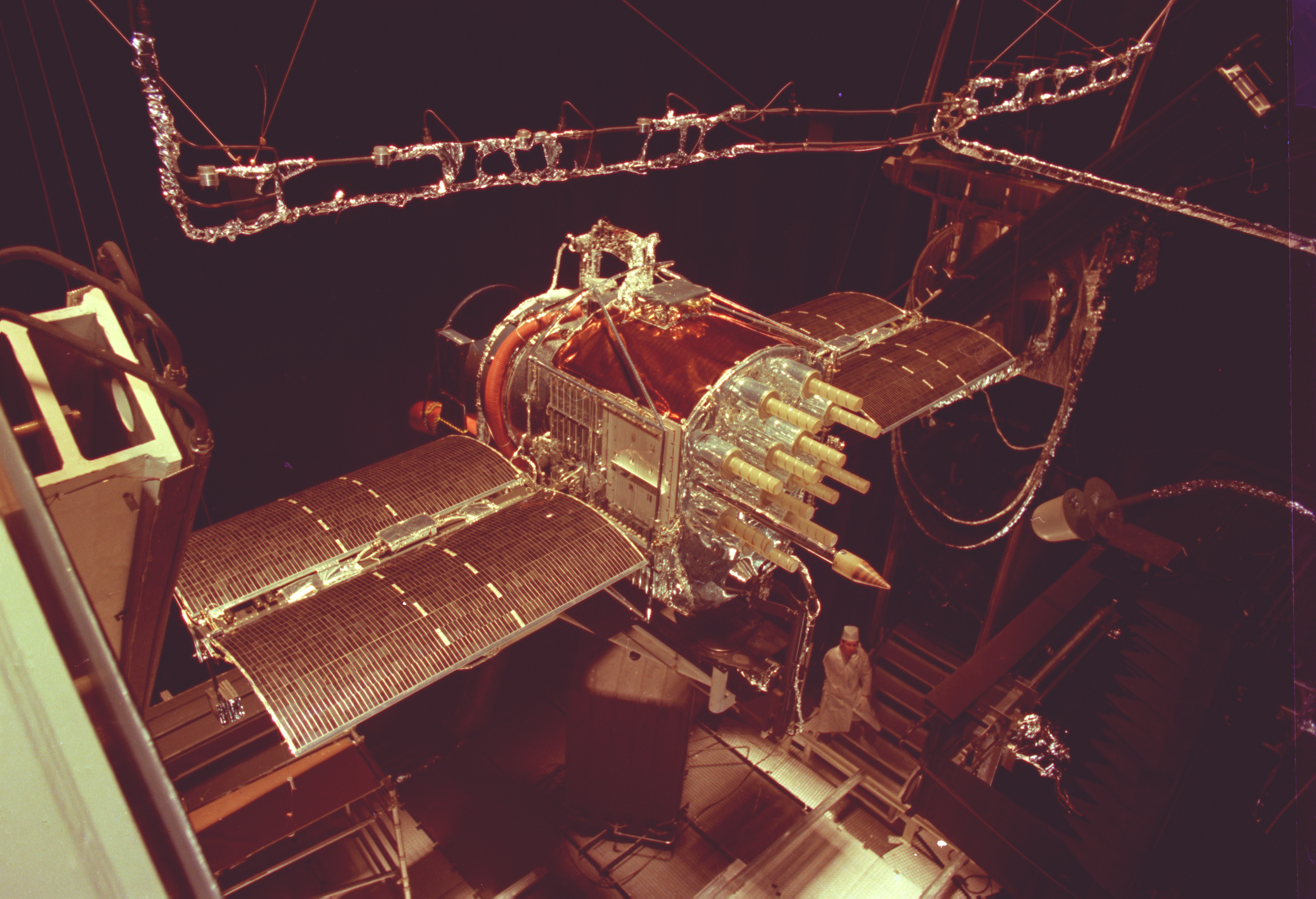
A full-scale GPS was tested in the Mark I Space Chamber at the Arnold Engineering Development Complex (AEDC) in 1977.

Rockwell International was awarded a contract in 1974 to build the first eight Block I satellites. In 1978, the contract was extended to build an additional three Block I satellites. Beginning with Navstar 1 in 1978, ten "Block I" GPS satellites were successfully launched. One satellite, "Navstar 7", was lost due to an unsuccessful launch on 18 December 1981.

The Block I satellites were launched from Vandenberg Air Force Base using Atlas rockets that were converted intercontinental ballistic missiles. The satellites were built by Rockwell International at the same plant in Seal Beach, California where the S-II second stages of the Saturn V rockets were built.

The Block I series consisted of the concept validation satellites and reflected various stages of system development. Lessons learned from the 10 satellites in the series were incorporated into the fully operational Block II series.

Dual solar arrays supplied over 400 watts of power, charging nickel–cadmium batteries for operations in Earth's shadow. S-band communications were used for control and telemetry, while an UHF channel provided cross-links between spacecraft. A hydrazine propulsion system was used for orbital correction. The payload included two L-band navigation signals at 1575.42 MHz (L1) and 1227.60 MHz (L2).

The final Block I launch was conducted on 9 October 1985, but the last Block I satellite was not taken out of service until 18 November 1995, well past its 5-year design life.

== Block II satellites ==
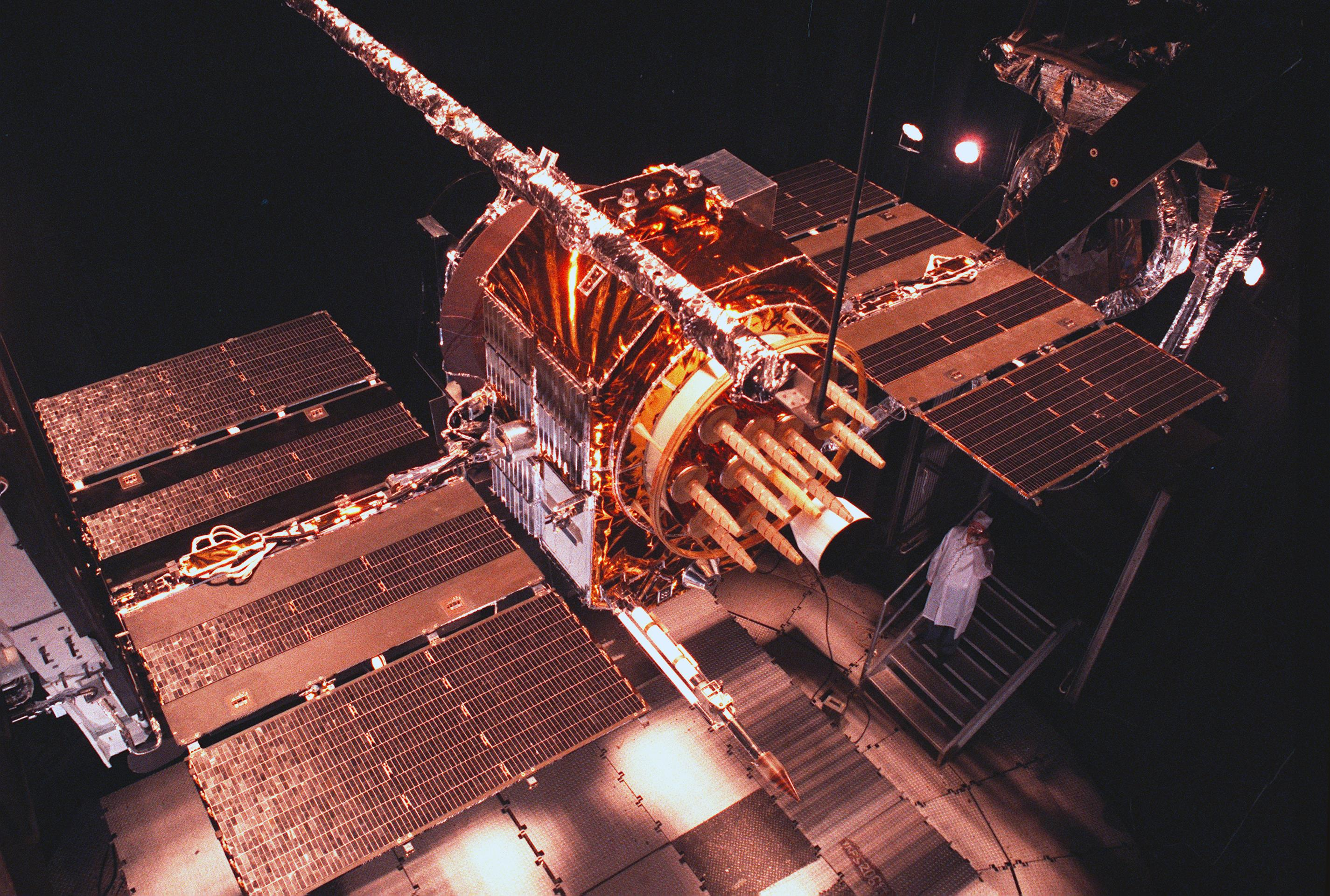
GPS II underwent a four-month series of qualification tests in the AEDC Mark I Space Chamber to determine whether the satellite could withstand extreme heat and cold in space, 1985.

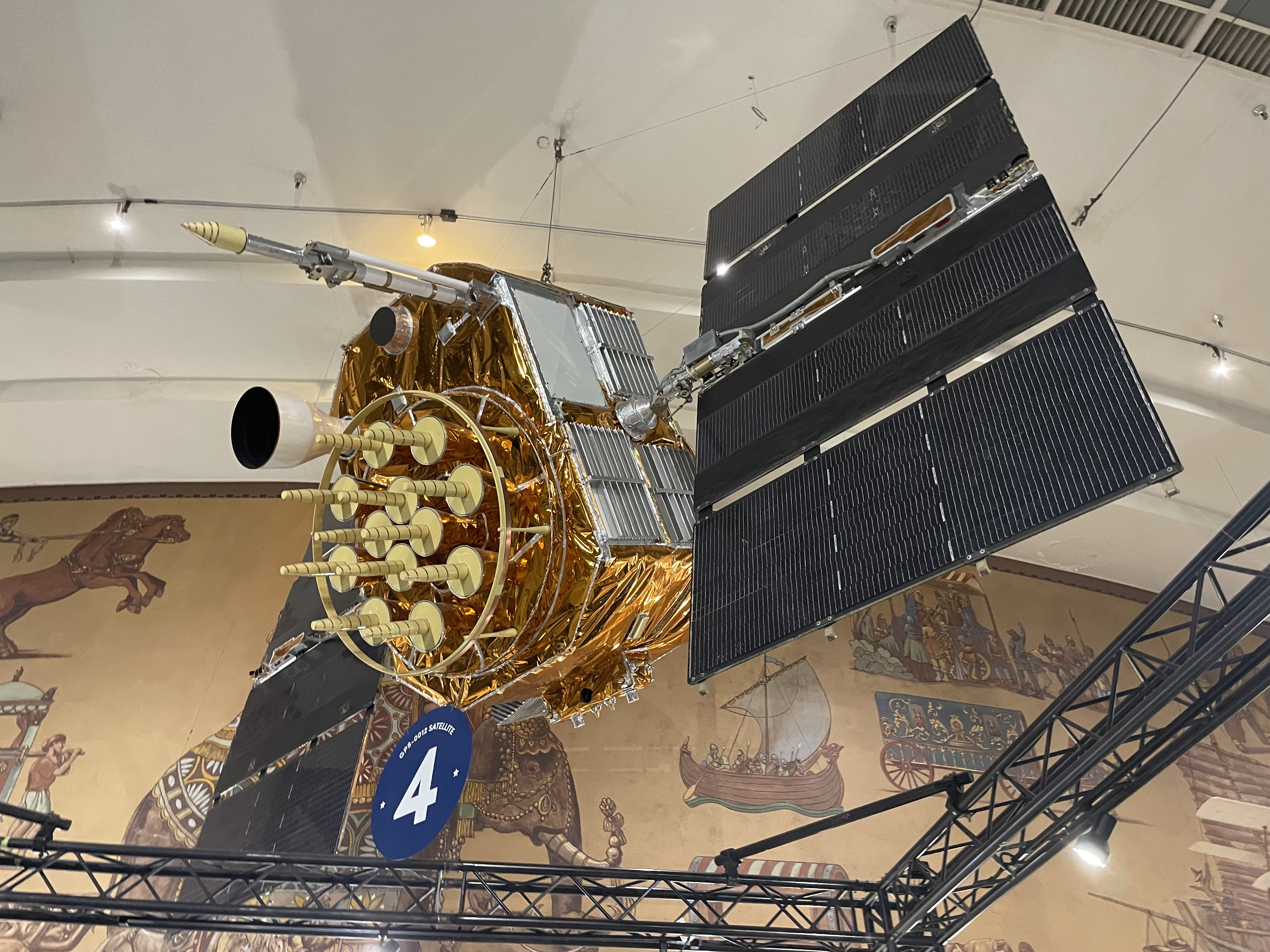
The same vehicle on display at the San Diego Air and Space Museum 30 years later.

The Block II satellites were the first full scale operational GPS satellites, designed to provide 14 days of operation without any contact from the control segment. The prime contractor was Rockwell International, which built a SVN 12 qualification vehicle after an amendment to the Block I contract. In 1983, the company was awarded an additional contract to build 28 Block II/IIA satellites.

Block II spacecraft were three-axis stabilized, with ground pointing using reaction wheels. Two solar arrays supplied 710 watts of power, while S-band communications were used for control and telemetry. A UHF channel was used for cross-links between spacecraft. A hydrazine propulsion system was used for orbital correction. The payload included two L-band GPS signals at 1575.42 MHz (L1) and 1227.60 MHz (L2). Each spacecraft carried two rubidium and two cesium clocks, as well as nuclear detonation detection sensors, leading to a mass of 1,660 kg (3,660 lb).

The first of the nine satellites in the initial Block II series was launched on 14 February 1989; the last was launched on 1 October 1990. The final satellite of the series to be taken out of service was decommissioned on 15 March 2007, well past its 7.5 year design life.

=== Block IIA series ===
The Block IIA satellites were slightly improved versions of the Block II series, designed to provide 180 days of operation without contact from the control segment. However, the mass increased to 1,816 kg (4,004 lb), with no increase to the 7.5 year design life.

Nineteen satellites in the Block IIA series were launched, the first on 26 November 1990 and the last on 6 November 1997. Two of the satellites in this series, numbers 35 and 36, were equipped with laser retro-reflectors, allowing them to be tracked independently of their radio signals, providing unambiguous separation of clock and ephemeris errors.

SVN-34, the last Block IIA satellite, broadcast on the PRN 18 signal. It was removed from service on 9 October 2019 but kept as an on-orbit spare until April 2020.

=== Block IIR series ===
The Block IIR series are "replenishment" (replacement) satellites developed by Lockheed Martin. Each satellite weighs 2,030 kg (4,480 lb) at launch and 1,080 kg (2,380 lb) once on orbit. The first attempted launch of a Block IIR satellite failed on 17 January 1997 when the Delta II rocket exploded 12 seconds into flight. The first successful launch was on 23 July 1997. Twelve satellites in the series were successfully launched. At least ten satellites in this block carried an experimental S-band payload for search and rescue, known as Distress Alerting Satellite System. They also had the same 7.5 year design life as their predecessors.

=== Block IIR-M series ===
The Block IIR-M satellites include a new military signal and a more robust civil signal, known as L2C. There are eight satellites in the Block IIR-M series, which were built by Lockheed Martin. The first Block IIR-M satellite was launched on 26 September 2005. The final launch of a IIR-M was on 17 August 2009. They also had the same 7.5 year design life as their predecessors.

=== Block IIF series ===
The Block IIF series are "follow-on" satellites developed by Boeing and first designed with the operational L5 signal in mind. The satellite has a mass of 1,630 kg (3,590 lb) and an increased design life of 12 years. The first Block IIF space vehicle was launched in May 2010 on a Delta IV rocket. The twelfth and final IIF launch was on 5 February 2016.

== Block III satellites ==
=== Block III series ===
GPS Block III is the first series of third-generation GPS satellites, incorporating new signals (such as L1C) and broadcasting at higher power levels. Their improved 15 year design life is 3x that of the first series. On 23 December 2018, the first GPS III satellite was launched aboard a SpaceX Falcon 9 Full Thrust. The last GPS III satellite is SV10, launched in April 2026.

=== Block IIIF series ===
The Block IIIF series is the second set of GPS Block III satellites, which will consist of up to 22 space vehicles. Block IIIF launches are expected to begin no earlier than 2027 and continue through 2037.

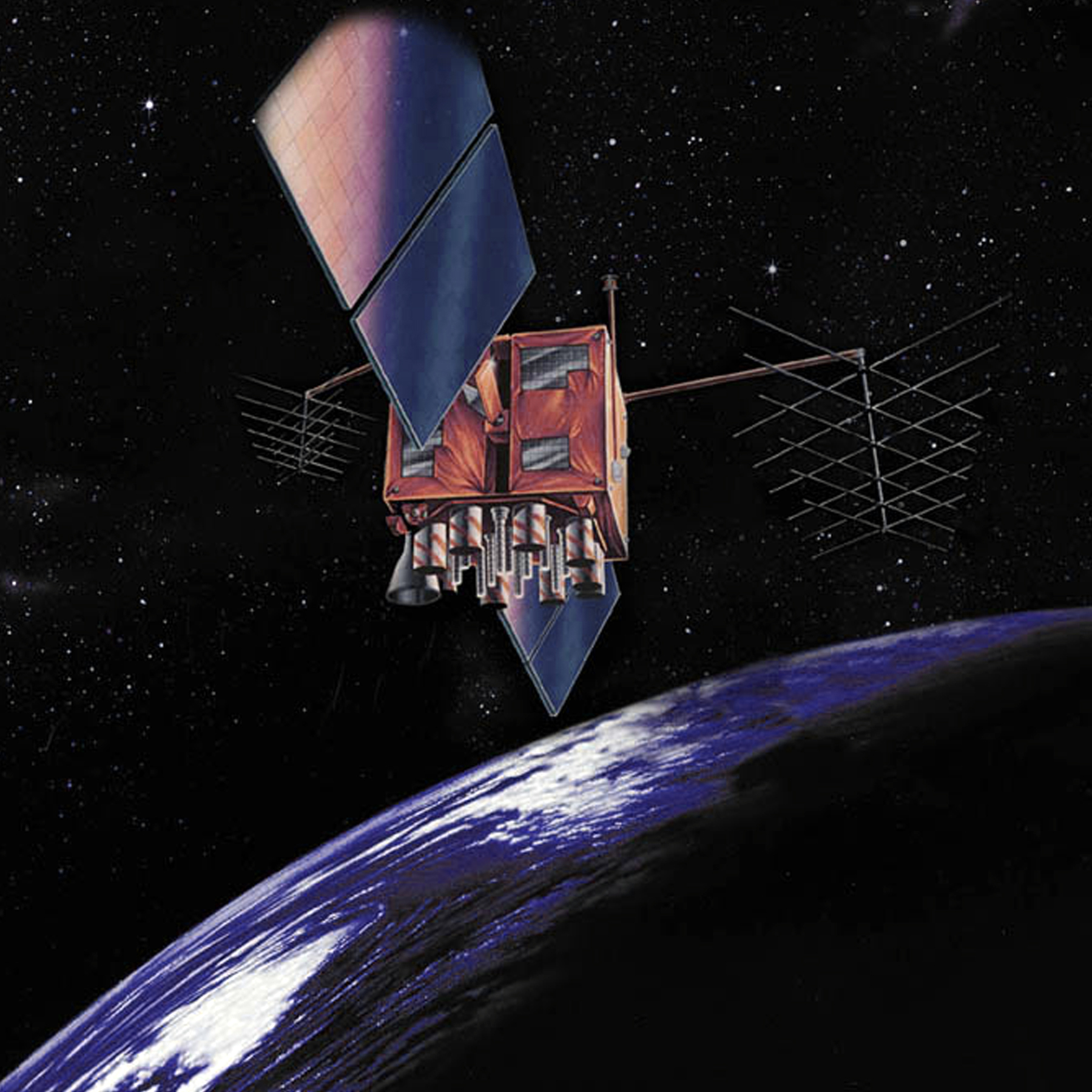
Artist's impression of a GPS-IIR satellite in orbit

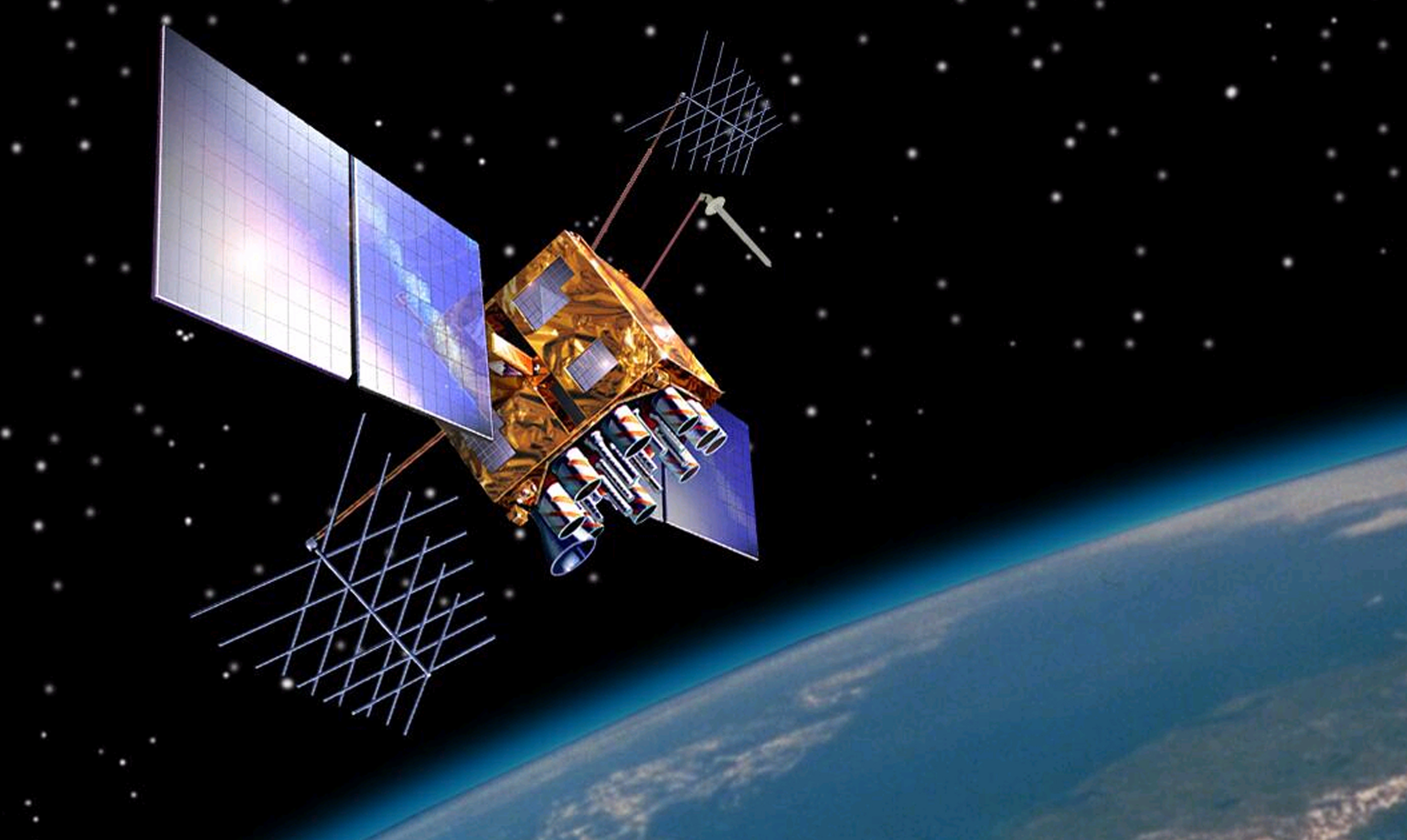
Artist's impression of a GPS-IIRM satellite in orbit

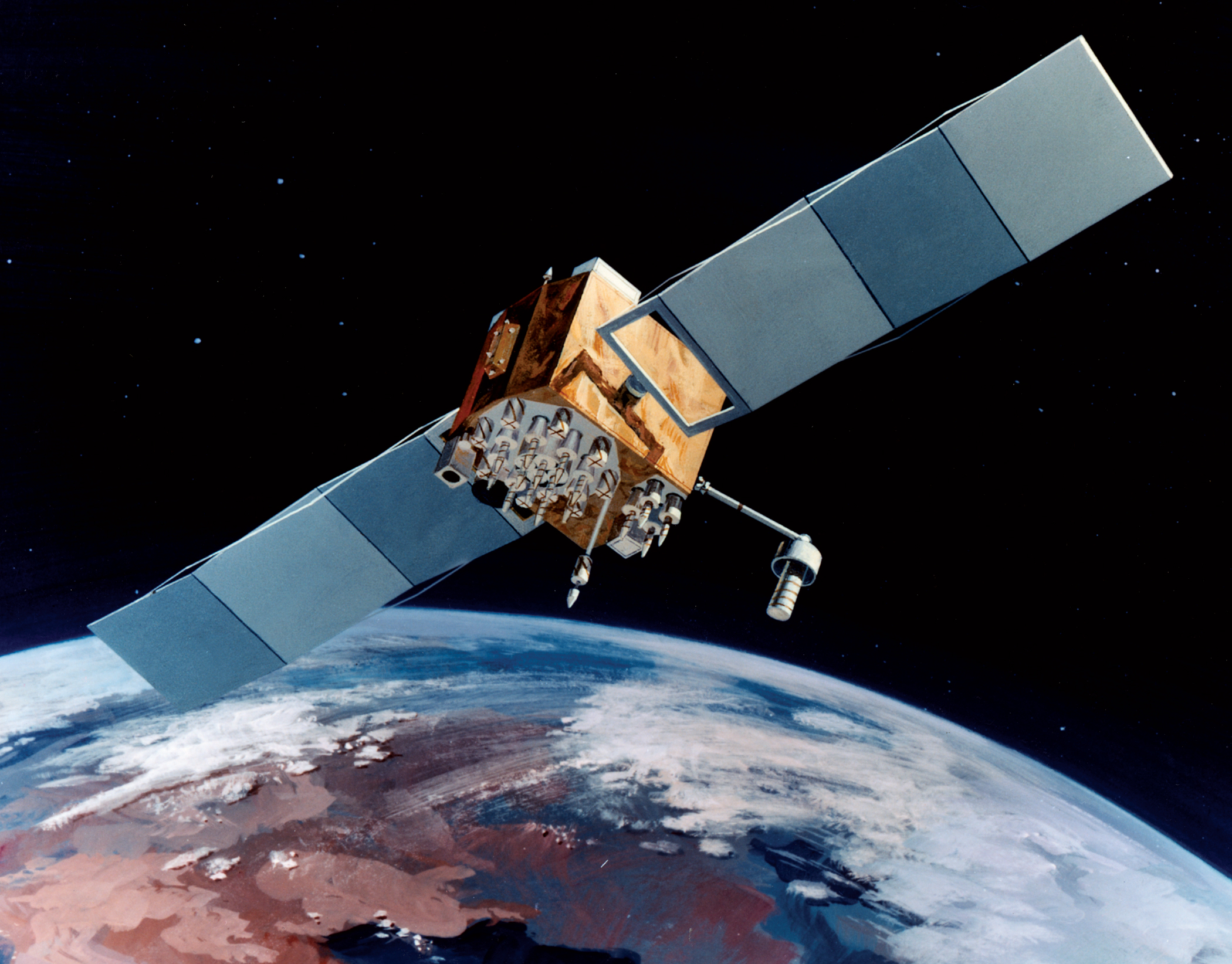
Artist's impression of a Navstar-2F satellite in orbit

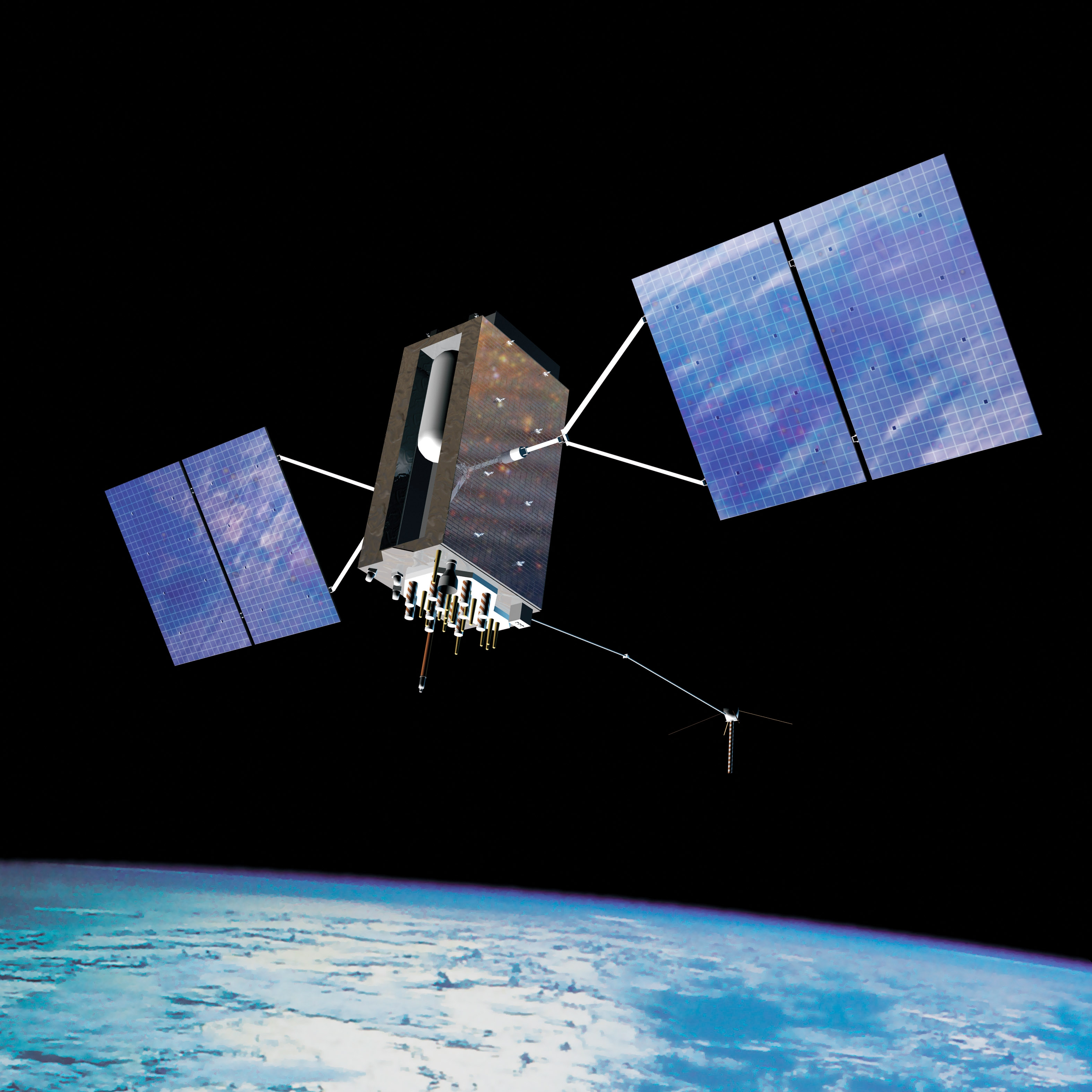
Artist's impression of a GPS Block III satellite in orbit

== See also ==
- List of GPS satellites
- GPS signals
