= GPS IIR-1 =

First of new class of GPS satellite, destroyed soon after launch in January 1997

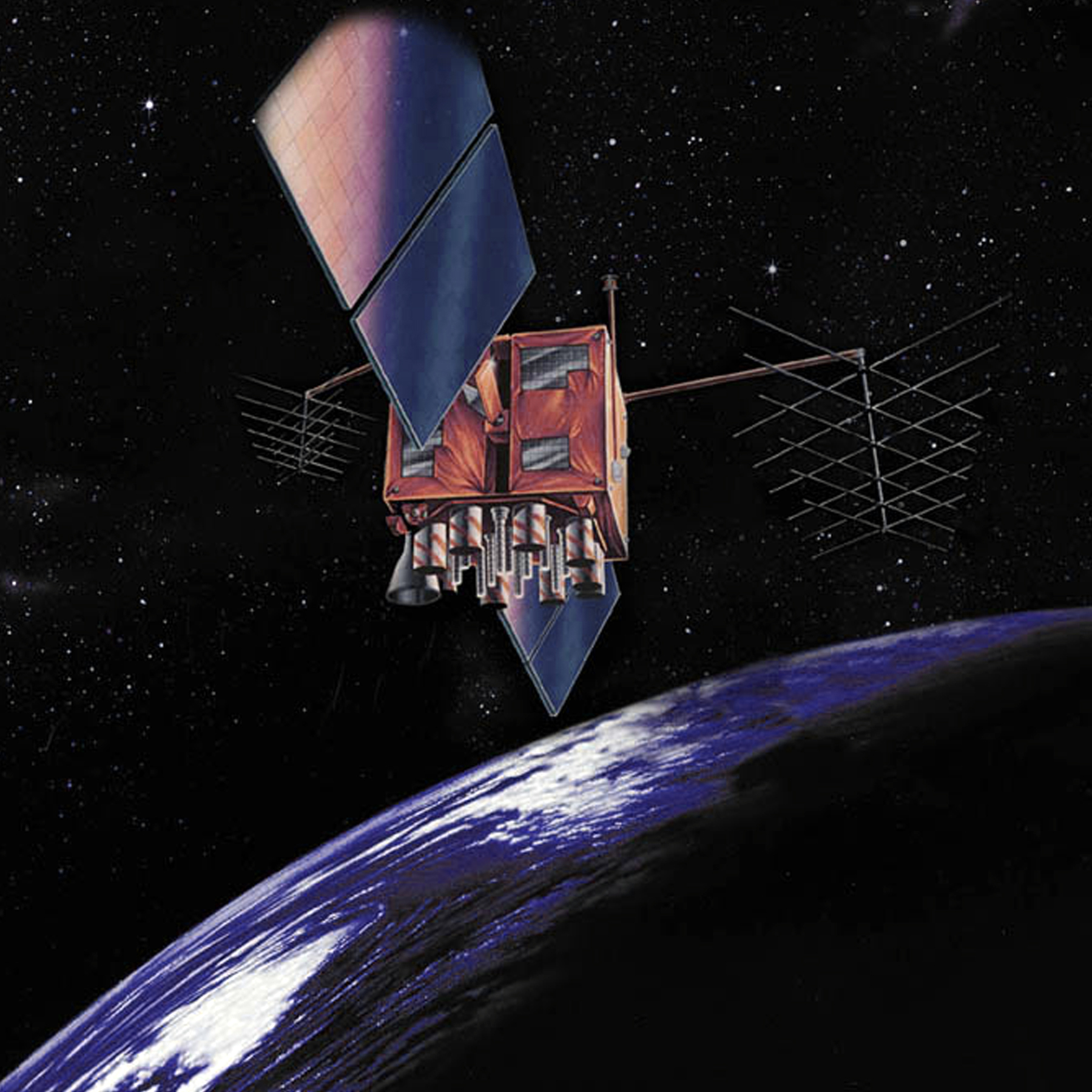
- A Block IIR GPS satellite
- Names: Navstar 42; GPS SVN-42
- Mission type: Navigation
- Operator: U.S. Air Force
- Mission duration: 10 years (planned); Failed to orbit

Spacecraft properties
- Spacecraft: GPS IIR
- Spacecraft type: GPS Block IIR
- Bus: AS-4000
- Manufacturer: Lockheed Martin
- Launch mass: 2,030 kg (4,480 lb)

Start of mission
- Launch date: 17 January 1997, 16:28:01 UTC
- Rocket: Delta II 7925-9.5 (Delta D241)
- Launch site: Cape Canaveral SLC-17A
- Contractor: McDonnell Douglas

Orbital parameters
- Reference system: Geocentric orbit (planned)
- Regime: Medium Earth orbit (Semi-synchronous)
- Perigee altitude: 20,200 km
- Apogee altitude: 20,200 km
- Inclination: 55.0°
- Period: 720.0 minutes

GPS IIR-1 or GPS SVN-42 was the first Block IIR GPS satellite to be launched. It was to have been operated as part of the United States Air Force Global Positioning System. It was launched on 17 January 1997, and was destroyed 13 seconds into its flight due to a malfunction of the Delta II launch vehicle that was carrying it. It was estimated to have cost US$40 million, with its launch vehicle costing US$55 million. The satellite that was used for the GPS IIR-1 mission was the second production IIR satellite, SVN-42.

== Launch ==
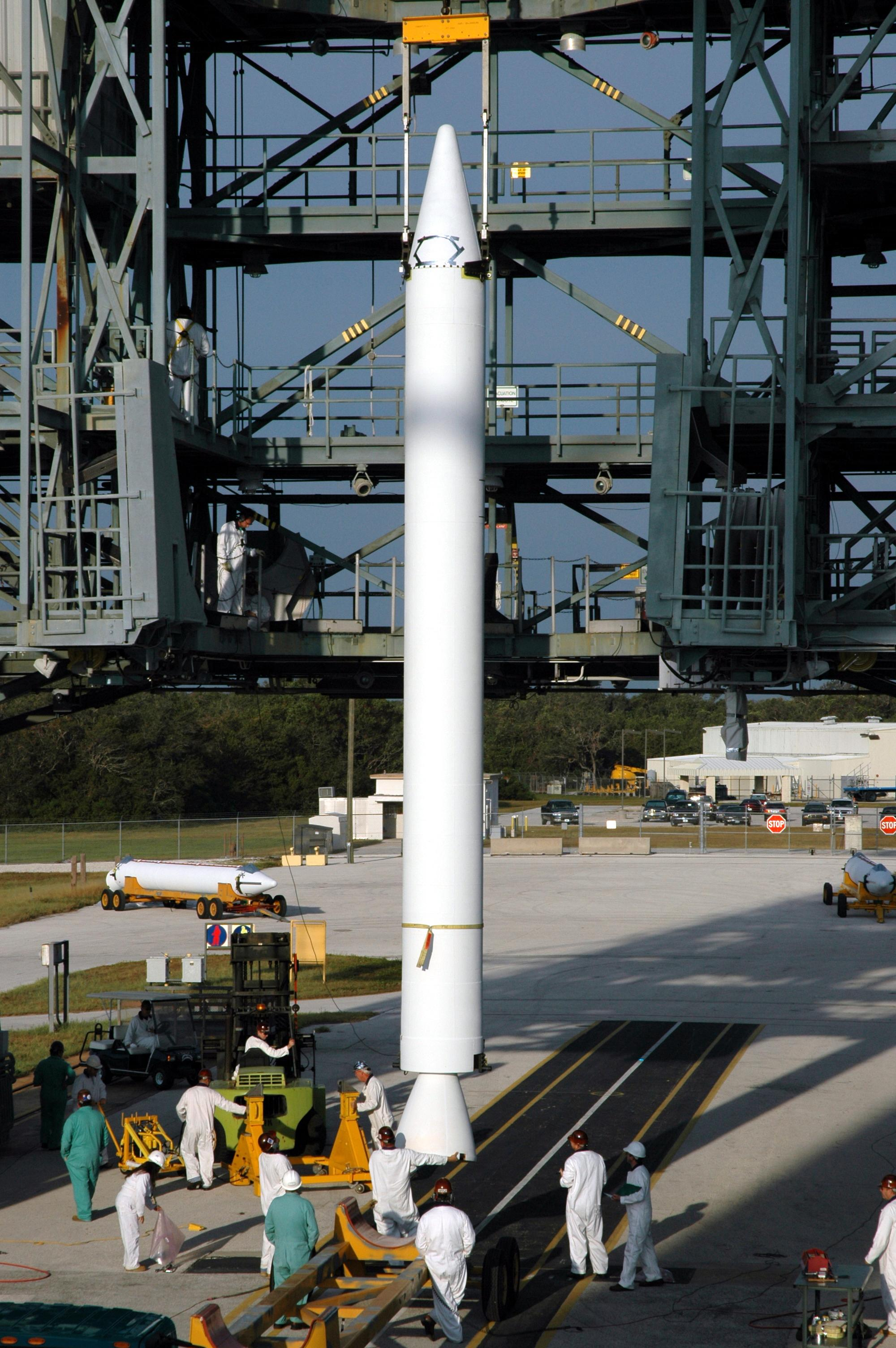
A Delta II solid rocket booster (SRB)

GPS IIR-1 was launched on a Delta II 7925-9.5 launch vehicle, serial number D241, from Launch Complex 17A (LC-17A) at the Cape Canaveral Air Force Station (CCAFS). The launch occurred at 16:28:01 UTC, on 17 January 1997. Thirteen seconds later, the rocket's flight termination system was activated by its onboard computer. This detonated explosive charges aboard the rocket, causing it to explode. At the time of explosion, the rocket was 490 m (1,610 ft) above the launch complex. It was the lowest-altitude launch failure at Cape Canaveral since Atlas-Centaur AC-5 in 1965 and only the third total loss of a Delta in the previous two decades.

== Investigation ==
An investigation determined that the failure was caused by a crack in the casing of the number 2 GEM-40 solid rocket motor, which started to form at T+6 seconds and grew from there. At T+12 seconds, the Solid rocket booster (SRB) casing ruptured and debris struck the number 8 SRB next to it, causing that motor to fail as well. One second later, the range safety destruct charges automatically activated, causing the rocket to auto-terminate, which led to the self-destruction of the first stage and the detonation of the remaining SRBs. The upper stages were blasted free. At T+21 seconds, the Range Safety Officer sent a manual destruct command to terminate the upper stages for safety purposes, resulting in their destruction. The GPS satellite and payload shroud survived intact until impacting the ground. It could not be determined with certainty what had tripped the destruct system on the first stage; possible explanations including a lanyard being pulled, a shock wave from the rupture of the number 2 SRB, or heat generated by the event.

The booster had been damaged by pressure from a support in a new transportation system that had recently been introduced. Following the failure, the system was revised, and ultrasound inspections of boosters on future flights were introduced.

== Debris ==
Debris from the explosion fell into the Atlantic Ocean and on the Cape Canaveral Air Force Station. Some debris landed around the launch pad, and a small fire started. Other debris landed in the parking lot outside the complex blockhouse, destroying twenty cars and trucks that were located there. Two hundred and fifty tons of debris fell within 915 m (3,002 ft) of the launch pad, to include on the grounds of the nearby Air Force Space and Missile Museum. One piece of debris made a hole in a cable track, allowing smoke to enter the blockhouse.

Personnel of the area around the launch site were advised to stay indoors, close windows, and turn off air conditioning systems as a precaution, as some vapors from the fuel could be irritant or toxic. The explosion was reported to have been felt 40 km (25 mi) away from the launch site, and damage to store windows 16 km (9.9 mi) away was reported.

== Impact ==
A number of Delta II launches were delayed while the cause of the failure was investigated and corrective action was taken. It returned to service on 5 May 1997, making the first Delta II launch from Vandenberg Air Force Base SLC-2W. That launch was successful.

With the retirement of the Delta II launch system, the GPS IIR-1 mission stands as the only outright failure of a Delta II rocket. The only partial failure of a Delta II was the launch of Koreasat 1, where one of the solid rocket motors failed to separate; the satellite still reached its correct orbit by using onboard propellant, which left it with a shorter than planned operational life expectancy.

GPS IIR-1 was to have replaced an older satellite, which was still operational at the time of its replacement's launch. This satellite was able to continue operating until another replacement could be launched.

The launch of GPS IIR-1 was the last to use the Complex 17 blockhouse, with future launches being controlled from a Launch Control Center in the 1st Space Launch Squadron Operations Building, 3 km (1.9 mi) south of the pad. This was already under construction at the time of the failure, as the blockhouse was unable to support the Delta III rocket, which was then under development. Following the failure, construction on the new control facilities was accelerated. Multiple personal vehicles were destroyed, totalling to $429,000 USD of damage.

== See also ==
- GOES-G
