= USA-150 =

American navigation satellite used for GPS

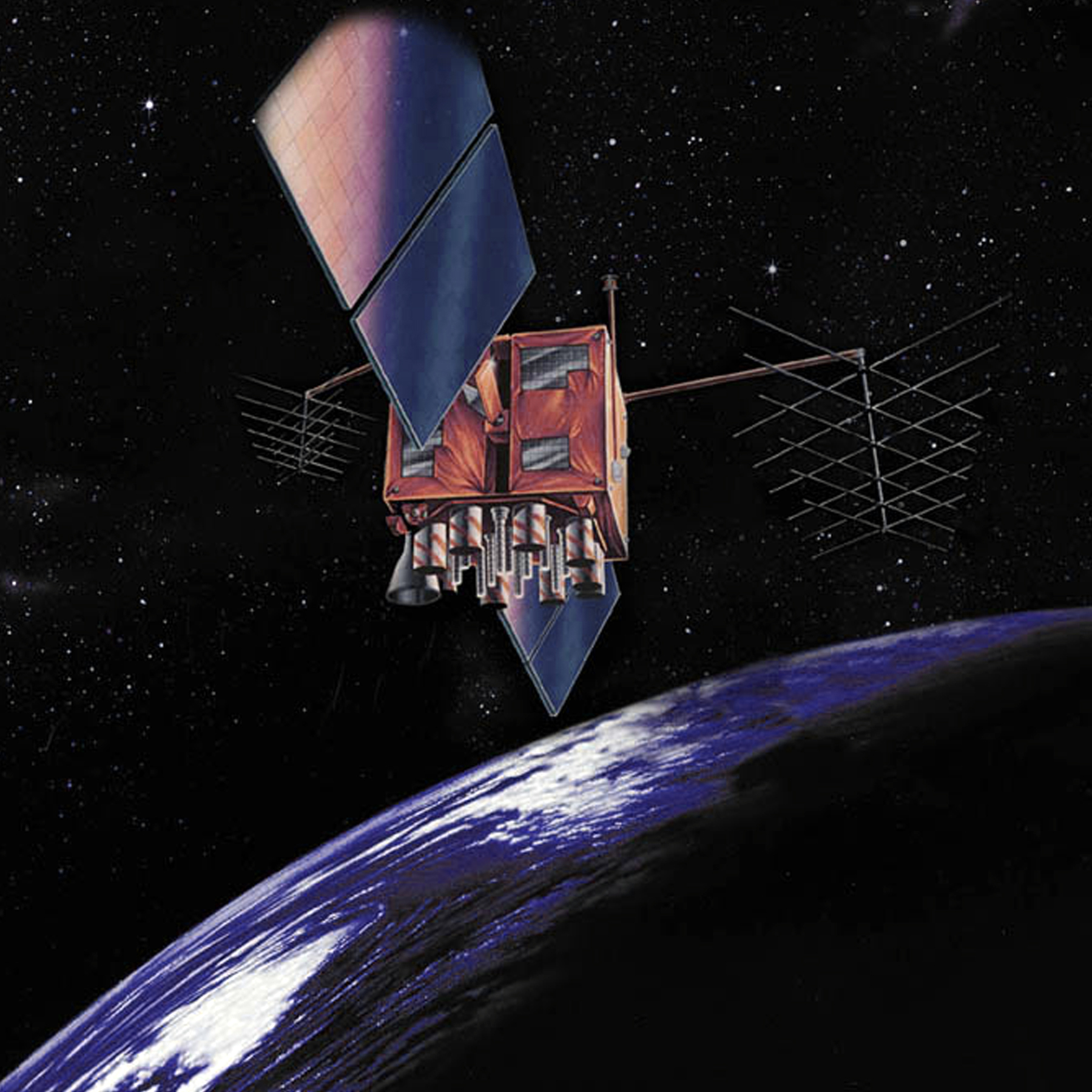
- A Block IIR GPS satellite
- Names: Navstar 47; GPS IIR-4; GPS SVN-51
- Mission type: Navigation
- Operator: U.S. Air Force
- COSPAR ID: 2000-025A
- SATCAT no.: 26360
- Mission duration: 10 years (planned)

Spacecraft properties
- Spacecraft: GPS II-R
- Spacecraft type: GPS Block IIR
- Bus: AS-4000
- Manufacturer: Lockheed Martin
- Launch mass: 2,032 kg (4,480 lb)

Start of mission
- Launch date: 11 May 2000, 01:48:00 UTC
- Rocket: Delta II 7925-9.5 (Delta D278)
- Launch site: Cape Canaveral, SLC-17A
- Contractor: McDonnell Douglas
- Entered service: 11 June 2000

End of mission
- Deactivated: 08 January 2026

Orbital parameters
- Reference system: Geocentric orbit
- Regime: Medium Earth orbit (Semi-synchronous)
- Slot: E-1
- Perigee altitude: 20,133 km (12,510 mi)
- Apogee altitude: 20,234 km (12,573 mi)
- Inclination: 54.9°
- Period: 718.02 minutes

USA-150, also known as GPS IIR-4 and GPS SVN-51, is an American navigation satellite which forms part of the Global Positioning System. It was the fourth Block IIR GPS satellite to be launched, out of thirteen in the original configuration, and twenty one overall. It was built by Lockheed Martin, using the AS-4000 satellite bus.

== Launch ==
USA-150 was launched at 01:48:00 UTC on 11 May 2000, atop a Delta II carrier rocket, flight number D278, flying in the 7925-9.5 configuration. The launch took place from Space Launch Complex 17A at the Cape Canaveral Air Force Station, and placed USA-150 into a transfer orbit. The satellite raised itself into medium Earth orbit using a Star-37FM apogee motor.

== Mission ==
By 11 June 2000, USA-150 was in an orbit with a perigee of 20,133 km (12,510 mi), an apogee of 20,234 km (12,573 mi), a period of 718.02 minutes, and 54.9° of inclination to the equator. It is used to broadcast the PRN 20 signal, and operates in slot 1 of plane E of the GPS constellation, having replaced USA-35, the first operational GPS satellite. The satellite has a mass of 2,032 kg (4,480 lb), and a design life of 10 years. Operational from 11 May 2000 to 04 August 2025, decommissioned until reactivated 30 Sep 2025 to 08 Jan 2026.
