= AJ-60A =

Solid rocket booster by Aerojet Rocketdyne

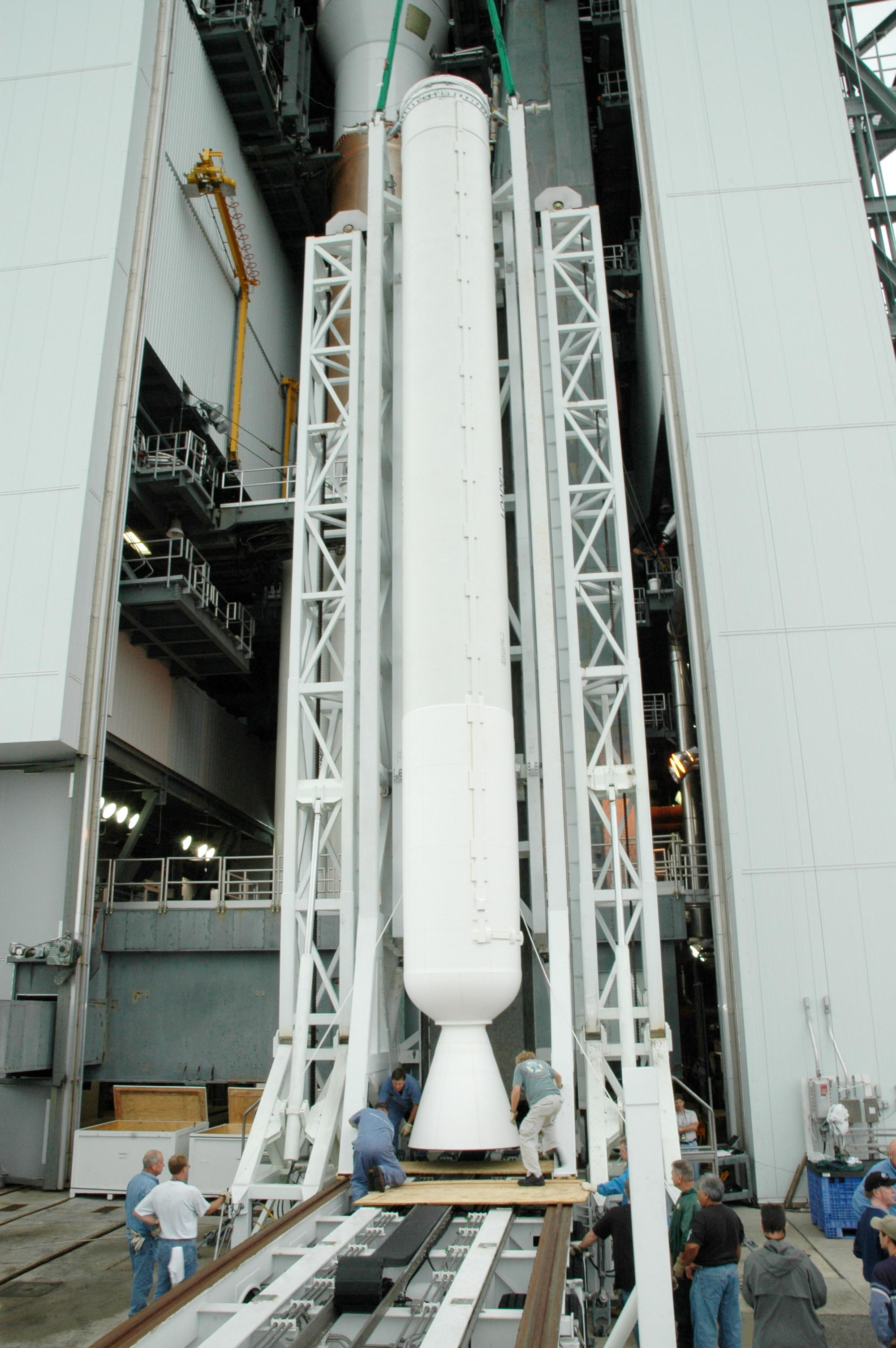
- An AJ-60A booster, without nosecone attached, being fitted to an Atlas V
- Manufacturer: Aerojet Rocketdyne
- Country of origin: USA
- Used on: Atlas V

General characteristics
- Height: 17.0 m (669 in)
- Diameter: 1.6 m (62 in)
- Gross mass: 46,697 kg (102,949 lb)

Engine details
- Maximum thrust: 1,688.4 kN (379,600 lbf)
- Burn time: 94 seconds
- Propellant: HTPB/AP (APCP)

AJ-60A is a solid rocket booster produced by Aerojet Rocketdyne. Up to 2020 they were used as strap-on boosters on all United Launch Alliance Atlas V rocket configurations. They continue to be used on the Atlas V N22 configuration used to launch the Boeing Starliner.

== History ==
The AJ-60A rocket motor was developed between 1999 and 2003 for use on the Atlas V.

On January 19, 2006 the New Horizons spacecraft to Pluto was launched directly into a solar-escape trajectory at 16.26 kilometers per second (58,536 km/h; 36,373 mph) from Cape Canaveral using an Atlas V version with 5 of these SRBs and Star 48B third stage. New Horizons passed the Moon's orbit in just nine hours.

In 2015, ULA announced that the Atlas V will switch to new GEM 63 boosters produced by Northrop Grumman Innovation Systems. (GEM 63XL, a stretched version of the GEM 63 booster is used on the Vulcan rocket.) The first Atlas V launched with GEM 63 boosters on November 13, 2020.

== Design ==
AJ-60A is a solid fueled rocket burning HTPB-based composite solid propellant. The casing is composed of a graphite-epoxy composite, and the engine throat and nozzle are made of carbon-phenolic composite. As configured for use on Atlas V, the nozzle is fixed at a 3 degree cant away from the attachment point, but Aerojet offers a variant with thrust vectoring capability. The Atlas V configuration also features an inward slanting nosecone, but it is available with a conventional nosecone or none at all for use on other rockets. The stages are designed to be transported by truck.
