= Graphite-Epoxy Motor =

American solid rocket booster

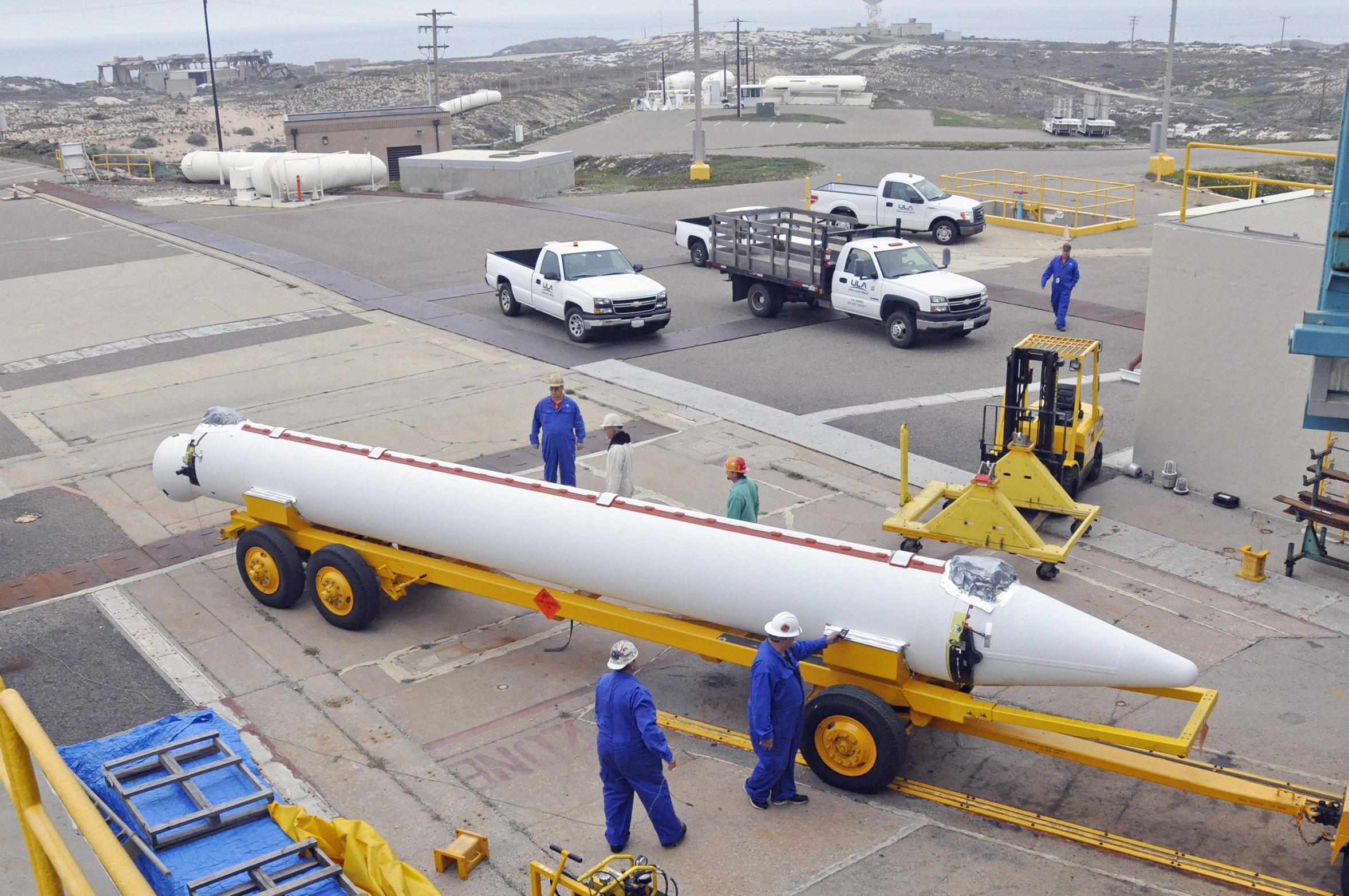
- A GEM 40 solid rocket motor being prepared for integration with a Delta II launch vehicle
- Manufacturer: Hercules (1990‍–‍1995); Alliant Techsystems (1995‍–‍2015); Orbital ATK (2015‍–‍2017); Northrop Grumman (2017‍–‍present)
- Country of origin: United States
- Used on: Ground-Based Interceptor; Delta II; Delta III; Delta IV; Atlas V; Vulcan Centaur; OmegA (Cancelled)

Associated stages
- Comparable: AJ-60A; Castor

Launch history
- Status: Active
- First flight: November 26, 1990

The Graphite-Epoxy Motor (GEM) is a family of solid rocket boosters developed in the late 1980s and first flown in 1990. The motors use casings made from carbon-fiber-reinforced polymer and a propellant consisting of ammonium perchlorate composite propellant, formulated with hydroxyl-terminated polybutadiene as a binder, ammonium perchlorate as an oxidizer, and aluminum powder as a fuel.

Production of GEM motors has passed through several companies due to mergers and acquisitions. They were manufactured by Hercules from 1990 to 1995, Alliant Techsystems from 1995 to 2015, and Orbital ATK from 2015 to 2017, before being taken over by Northrop Grumman in 2017.

GEM boosters are used on the Vulcan Centaur launch vehicle operated by United Launch Alliance (ULA), as well as the Ground-Based Interceptor missile, and were previously flown on the Delta II, Delta III, Delta IV, and Atlas V. Motor designations include numerals indicating booster diameter in inches.

The series originated with the GEM 40 for the Delta II, followed by the larger GEM 46 for the Delta III and Delta II Heavy, which increased length and diameter and introduced optional thrust vectoring nozzles. The GEM 60 was subsequently developed for the Delta IV, providing additional liftoff thrust for Medium+ configurations with fixed or vectorable nozzles. The GEM 63 was a replacement for the older AJ-60A in order to reduce costs and increase performance on Atlas V. The GEM 63XL for the Vulcan Centaur is the only current GEM motor in use.

== Active variants ==
=== GEM 63XL ===
The GEM 63XL, developed by Northrop Grumman, is an extended version of the GEM 63, approximately 73 inches (190 cm) longer. Each booster has a mass of about 117,000 pounds (53 metric tons). Static test firings began in 2020, and the booster entered service with the Vulcan Centaur launch vehicle on its first flight on January 8, 2024. Up to six GEM 63XLs can be mounted on a Vulcan core, depending on mission requirements.

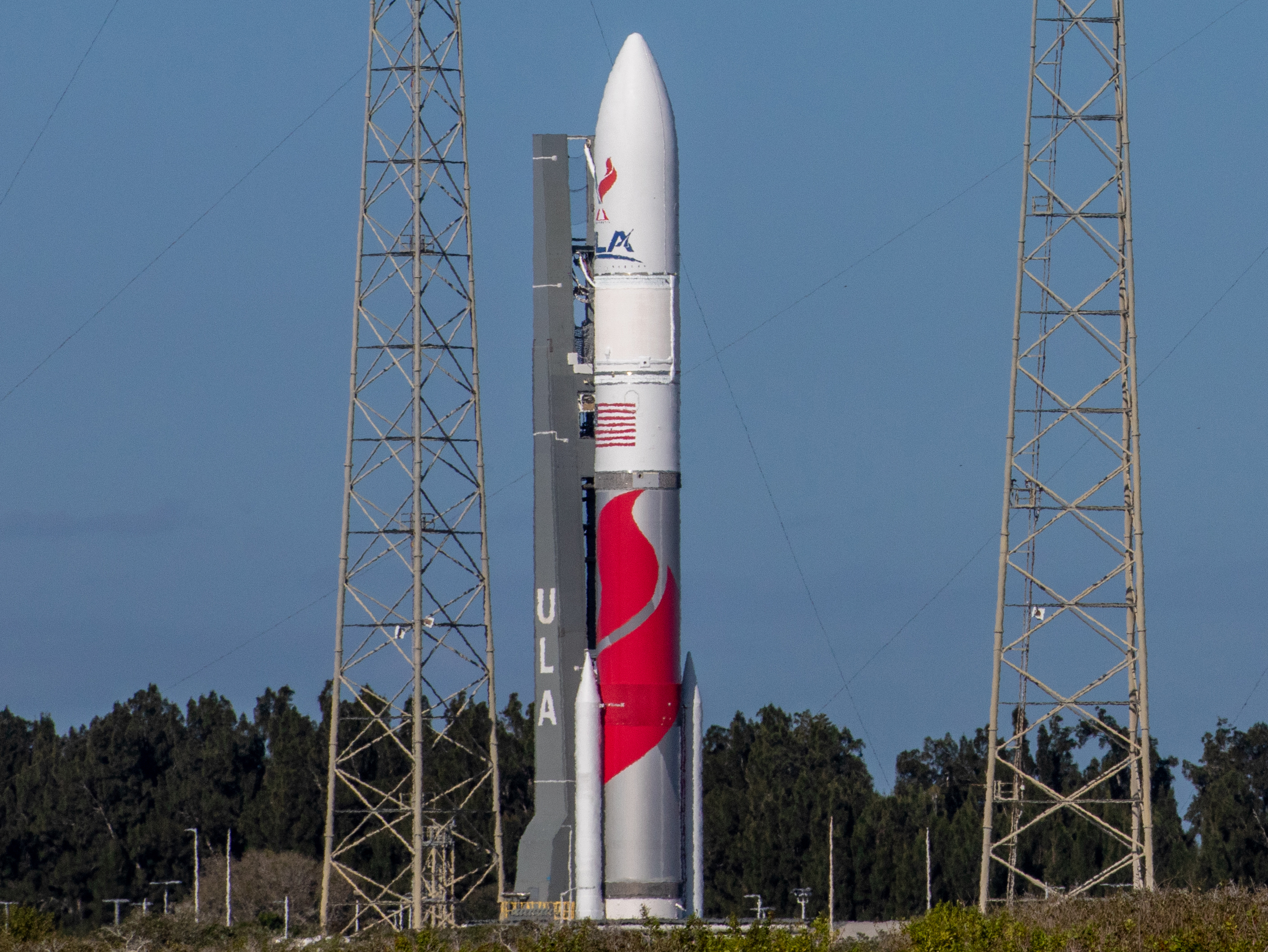
A Vulcan Centaur in VC2 configuration with 2 GEM 63XL boosters.

A variant equipped with a thrust-vectoring nozzle, the GEM 63XLT, was under development for the cancelled OmegA launch vehicle.

==== Anomalies ====
On October 4, 2024, a GEM 63XL experienced a partial failure about 35 seconds after liftoff during the Vulcan Centaur Cert-2 mission. change in the motor's exhaust plume and debris falling from the vehicle were observed. Analyses indicated damage or structural failure of the nozzle. Despite the anomaly, the mission reached orbit after burnout and separation of the two boosters at about 2 minutes 10 seconds into flight. The nozzle failure was later attributed to manufacturing defects.

In February 2026, another Vulcan mission experienced a performance anomaly affecting one of four solid rocket motors. A ULA vice president stated that "early during flight, the team observed a significant performance anomaly on one of the four solid rocket motors".

== Retired variants ==
=== GEM 40 ===
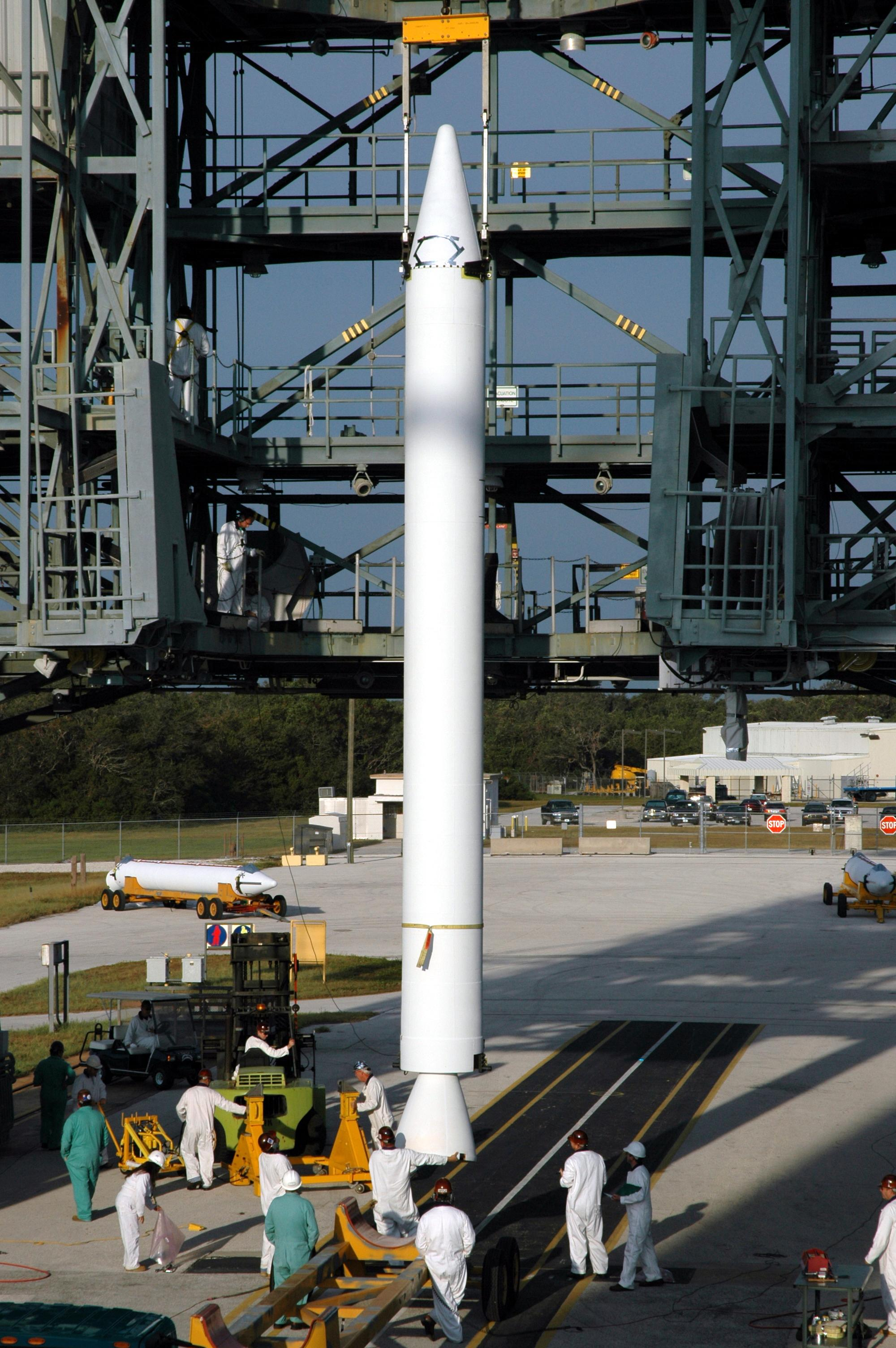
A GEM 40 is hoisted for attachment to a Delta II

The GEM 40 was a 40.4-inch-diameter (1,030 mm) solid rocket motor developed for the 7000-series Delta II launch vehicle beginning in 1987 by Hercules. Its first flight took place in 1990 on the USA-66 mission, when 9 boosters were used on a Delta II 7925 launcher. The use of composite materials allowed for casings lighter than the steel casings of the Castor 4 SRMs they replaced. The reduction in weight was used to extend the GEM 40 by 5.9 feet (1.8 m) compared to the Castor 4 used on 6000-series Delta II. Delta II vehicles could be configured with three, four, or nine GEM 40 boosters. When using three or four boosters, all GEM 40s were ignited on the ground. On nine-booster Delta II, six were ignited on the ground; the remaining three were ignited in flight after burnout of the first six.

==== Failures ====
On August 5, 1995, a GEM 40 failed to separate from a Delta II 7925 carrying Koreasat 1. The excess mass of the booster resulted in the satellite reaching a lower orbit than intended. The satellite was able to correct for the error using on-board propellant.

On January 17, 1997, a Delta II (Delta 241) exploded due to a catastrophic failure in a GEM 40. The failure triggered the launch vehicle's self-destruct function 13 seconds after ignition. An Air Force investigation determined that the motor's casing had been damaged prior to launch, causing the case to split open soon after ignition.

=== GEM 40VN ===
The GEM 40VN, a thrust-vectoring variant of the GEM 40, was developed for the Ground-Based Midcourse Defense (GMD) anti-ballistic missile program. It uses the same basic motor configuration as the GEM 40, with a modified nozzle assembly providing up to ±6-degree thrust vector control. The motor can be configured for in-line or strap-on applications, and an extended nozzle is available for air ignition. A version was qualified for use on the Boost Vehicle/Boost Vehicle Plus (BV/BV+) configurations of the GMD interceptor program. The program later switched to an Orion 50-based missile.

=== GEM 46 ===
The GEM 46 was a 45.1-inch-diameter (1,150 mm) solid rocket motor originally developed for Delta III by Alliant Techsystems. This solid motor variant included thrust vector control (TVC) to help steer the vehicle. After the discontinuation of the Delta III, GEM 46 motors (without TVC) were used on the Delta II to create the Delta II Heavy, which could only be launched from a modified pad at Cape Canaveral Air Force Station, SLC-17B. Both Delta III and Delta II Heavy used nine GEM 46s, with six ignited on the ground and three .

==== Failures ====
On August 27, 1998, the GEM 46 boosters on the first Delta III, carrying the Galaxy 10 satellite, depleted their hydraulic fluid used to control the thrust-vectoring nozzle. This was due to guidance issues with the rest of the rocket, which forced the solid rocket motors to make rapid adjustments to compensate, using up the supply of hydraulic fluid before burnout. The nozzles were then stuck in a position that turned the rocket over, triggering the vehicle's self-destruct function 70 seconds after ignition.

=== GEM 60 ===
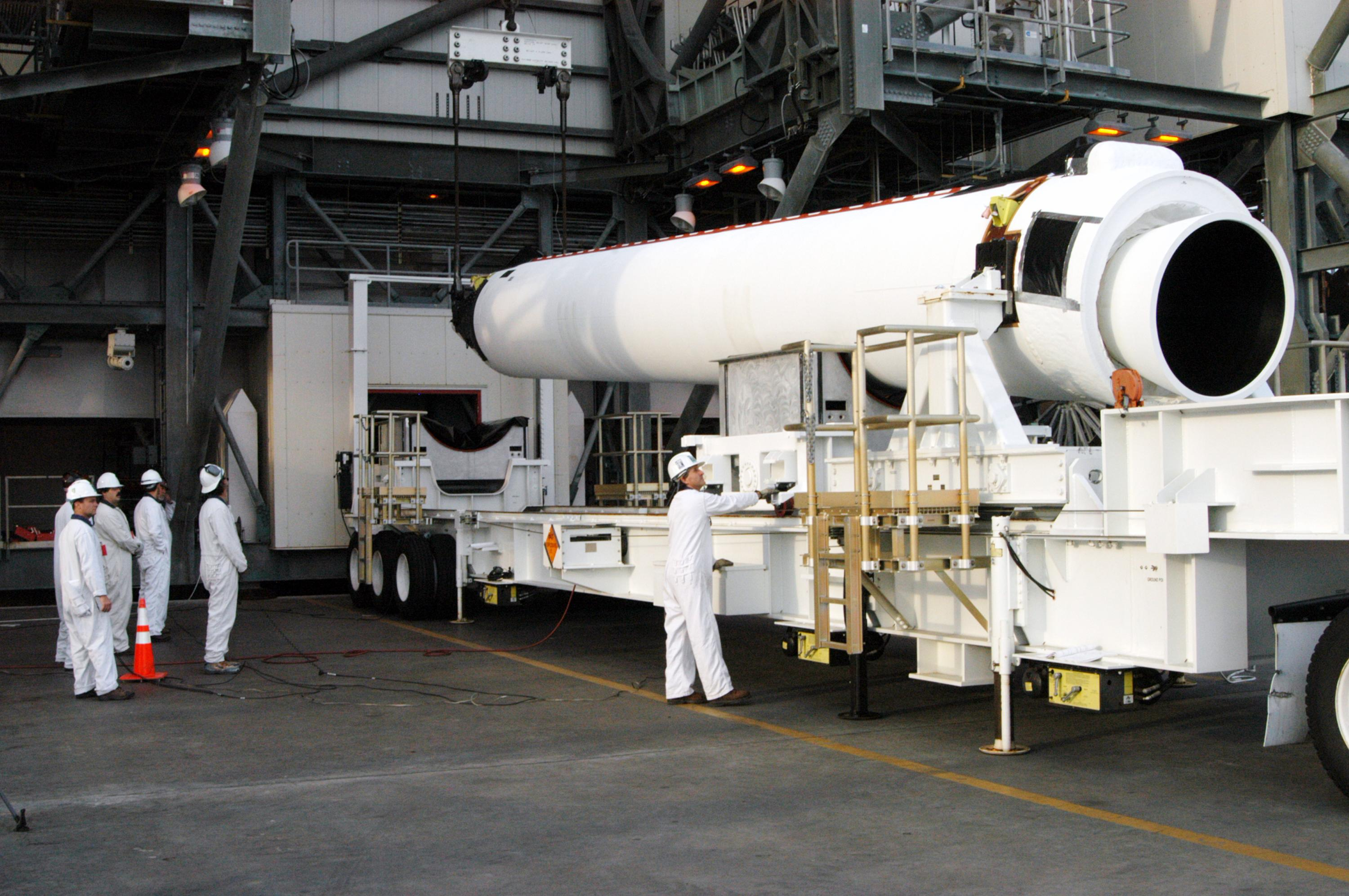
A GEM 60 being prepared for integration onto a Delta IV

The GEM 60 was a 60-inch-diameter (1,500 mm) solid motor used on the Delta IV family of launch vehicles, used with and without thrust vector control. Developed for the EELV program, its first flight was on November 20, 2002, boosting the first launch of the Delta IV. Delta IV Medium+ launchers were built with either two or four GEM 60. The added performance from the solid rocket motors allowed variants of the Delta IV Medium+ to accommodate a larger second stage. The motor was retired in 2019 after the final Delta IV Medium launch. Throughout its lifetime, 64 GEM 60 boosters were flown; there were no failures.

=== GEM 63 ===
The GEM 63 was a 63.2-inch-diameter (1,610 mm) solid motor used on the Atlas V. It was developed by Orbital ATK as a "drop-in" replacement for the AJ-60A solid rocket booster built by Aerojet Rocketdyne. Its dimensions were similar to those of the AJ-60A. The Atlas V first flew with the GEM 63 on the NROL-101 mission in 2020. According to ULA, the GEM 63 provided higher performance at about half the cost of the AJ-60A. The motor was retired in 2026 after the final Atlas V with satellites launched. Throughout its lifetime, 77 GEM 63 boosters were flown; there were no failures.

== Version comparison ==
Data from Northrop Grumman catalog

Name	Application	Length	Diameter	Mass		Thrust	Specific impulse	Burn time (sec.)	First flight	Final flight
Name	Application	Length	Diameter	Gross	Propellant	Thrust	Specific impulse	Burn time (sec.)	First flight	Final flight
GEM 40	Delta II	11 m (435 in)	1.03 m (40.4 in)	12,962 kg (28,577 lb)	11,770 kg (25,940 lb)	643.8 kN (144,740 lb_{f})	274 s (2.69 km/s)	63.3	November 26, 1990	September 15, 2018
GEM 40 (air‑lit)	Delta II	11 m (449.1 in)	1.03 m (40.4 in)	13,101 kg (28,883 lb)	11,770 kg (25,940 lb)	665.7 kN (149,660 lb_{f})	283.4 s (2.779 km/s)	63.3	November 26, 1990	September 15, 2018
GEM 40VN	Ground-Based Interceptor	11 m (425.1 in)	1.03 m (40.4 in)	13,102 kg (28,886 lb)	11,770 kg (25,940 lb)	478.74 kN (107,625 lb_{f})	265.3 s (2.602 km/s)	64.6		
GEM 46	Delta II Heavy, Delta III	12.59 m (495.8 in)	1.15 m (45.1 in)	18,860 kg (41,590 lb)	16,860 kg (37,180 lb)	611 kN (137,300 lb_{f})	277.8 s (2.724 km/s)	75.9	August 26, 1998	September 10, 2011
GEM 46 (air‑lit)	Delta II Heavy, Delta III	12.92 m (508.6 in)	1.15 m (45.1 in)	19,069 kg (42,039 lb)	16,860 kg (37,180 lb)	920 kN (206,000 lb_{f})	284 s (2.79 km/s)	75.9	August 26, 1998	September 10, 2011
GEM 46 (vectorable)	Delta III	12.48 m (491.5 in)	1.15 m (45.1 in)	19,140 kg (42,196 lb)	16,860 kg (37,180 lb)	875 kN (196,600 lb_{f})	279.8 s (2.744 km/s)	76.9	August 26, 1998	August 23, 2000
GEM 60	Delta IV M+	13.2 m (518 in)	1.5 m (60 in)	33,183 kg (73,156 lb)	29,698 kg (65,472 lb)	1,248.9 kN (280,767 lb_{f})	275 s (2.7 km/s)	90.8	November 20, 2002	August 22, 2019
GEM 60 (vectorable)	Delta IV M+	13.2 m (518 in)	1.5 m (60 in)	33,650 kg (74,185 lb)	29,698 kg (65,472 lb)	1,235.9 kN (277,852 lb_{f})	274 s (2.69 km/s)	90.8	November 20, 2002	August 22, 2019
GEM 63	Atlas V	20.1 m (792 in)	1.62 m (63.7 in)	49,342 kg (108,781 lb)	44,087 kg (97,195 lb)	1,649.6 kN (370,835 lb_{f})	279.06 s (2.737 km/s)	97.6	November 13, 2020	July 2, 2026
GEM 63XL	Vulcan Centaur	22 m (865.3 in)	1.62 m (63.7 in)	53,030 kg (116,920 lb)	47,853 kg (105,497 lb)	2,061 kN (463,249 lb_{f})	280.3 s (2.749 km/s)	87.3	January 8, 2024	—N/a

== Gallery ==
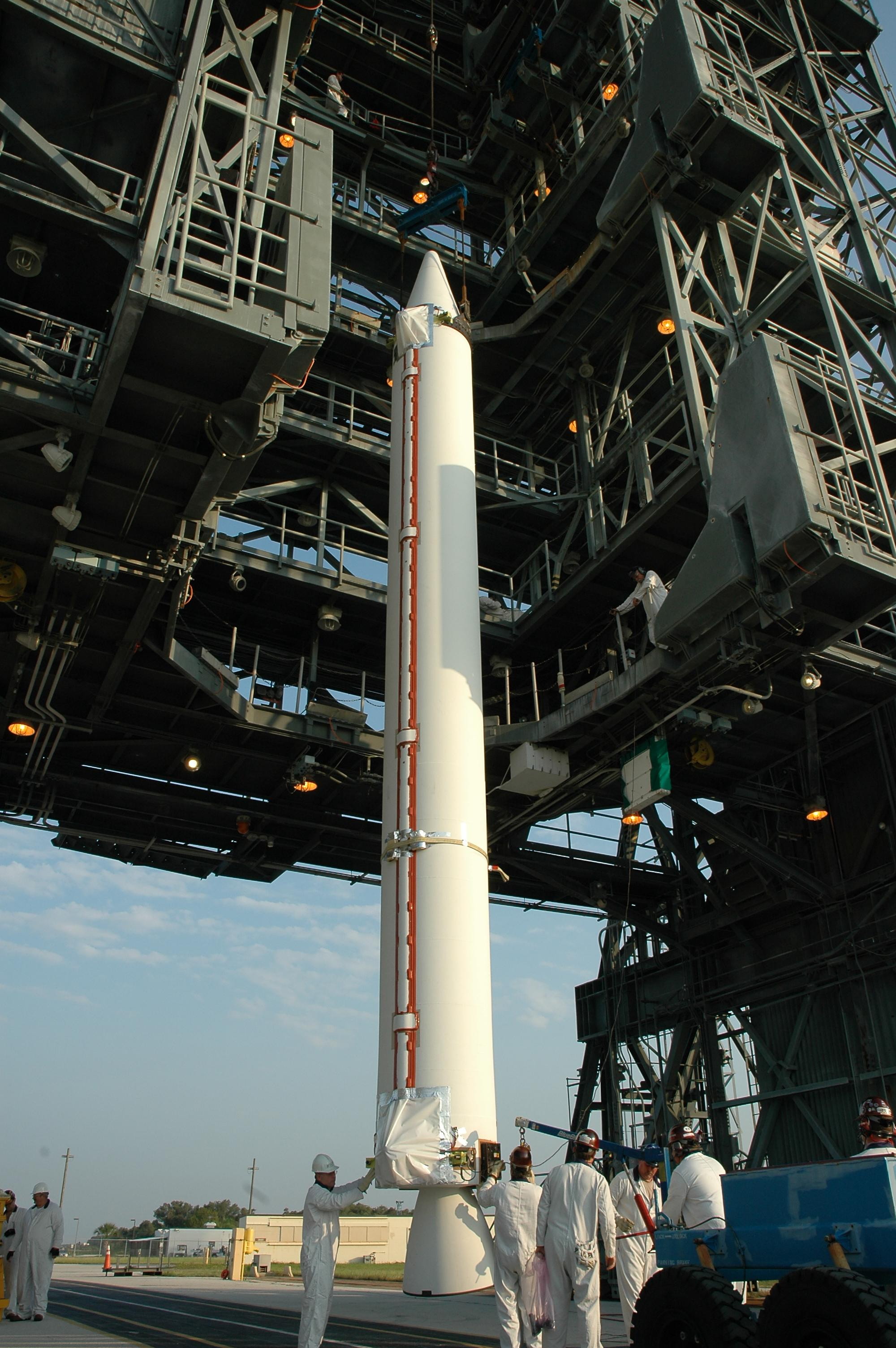
A GEM 46 motor prior to mating to a Delta II 7925H

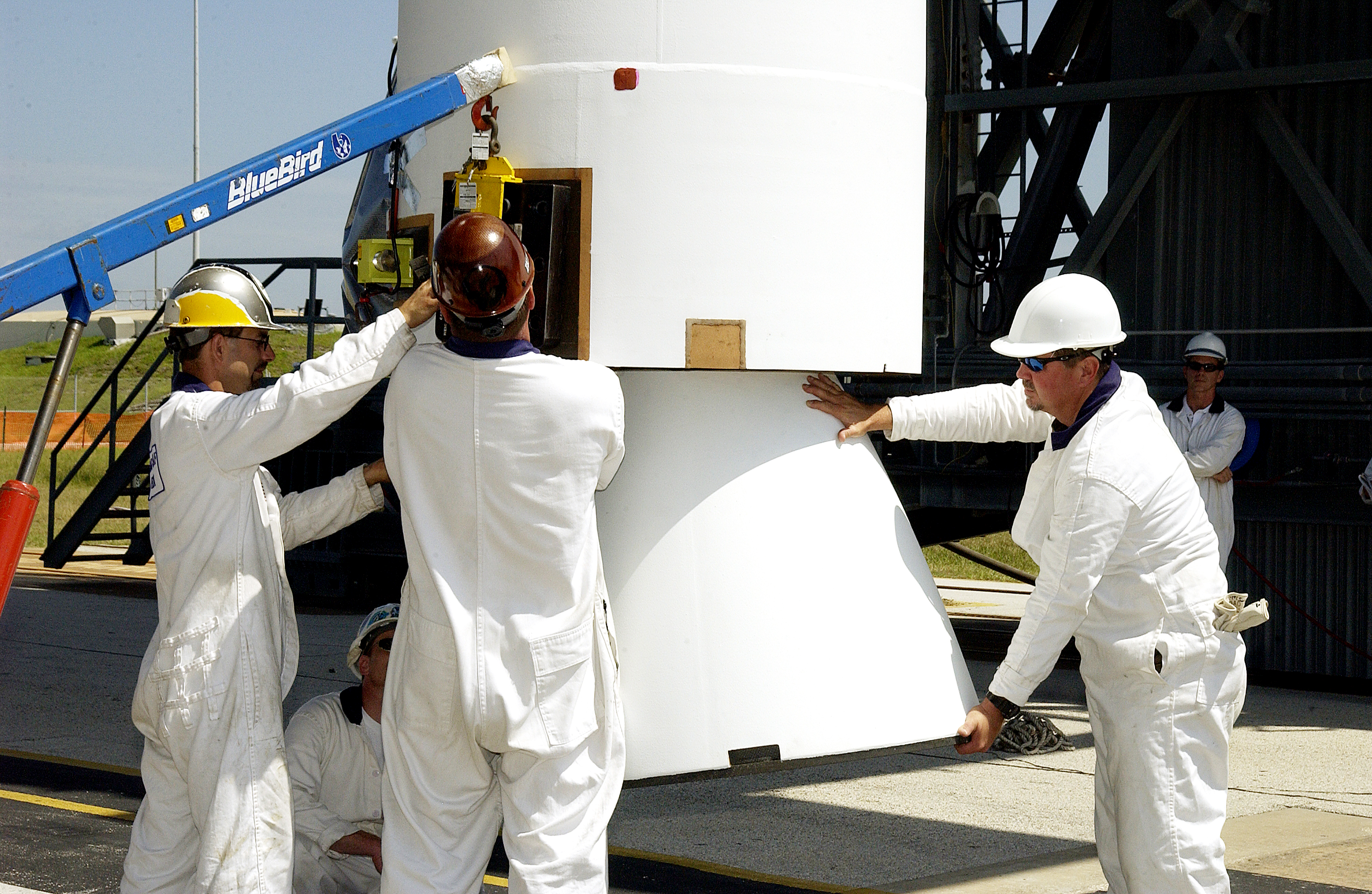
Technicians prepare a GEM 46 booster

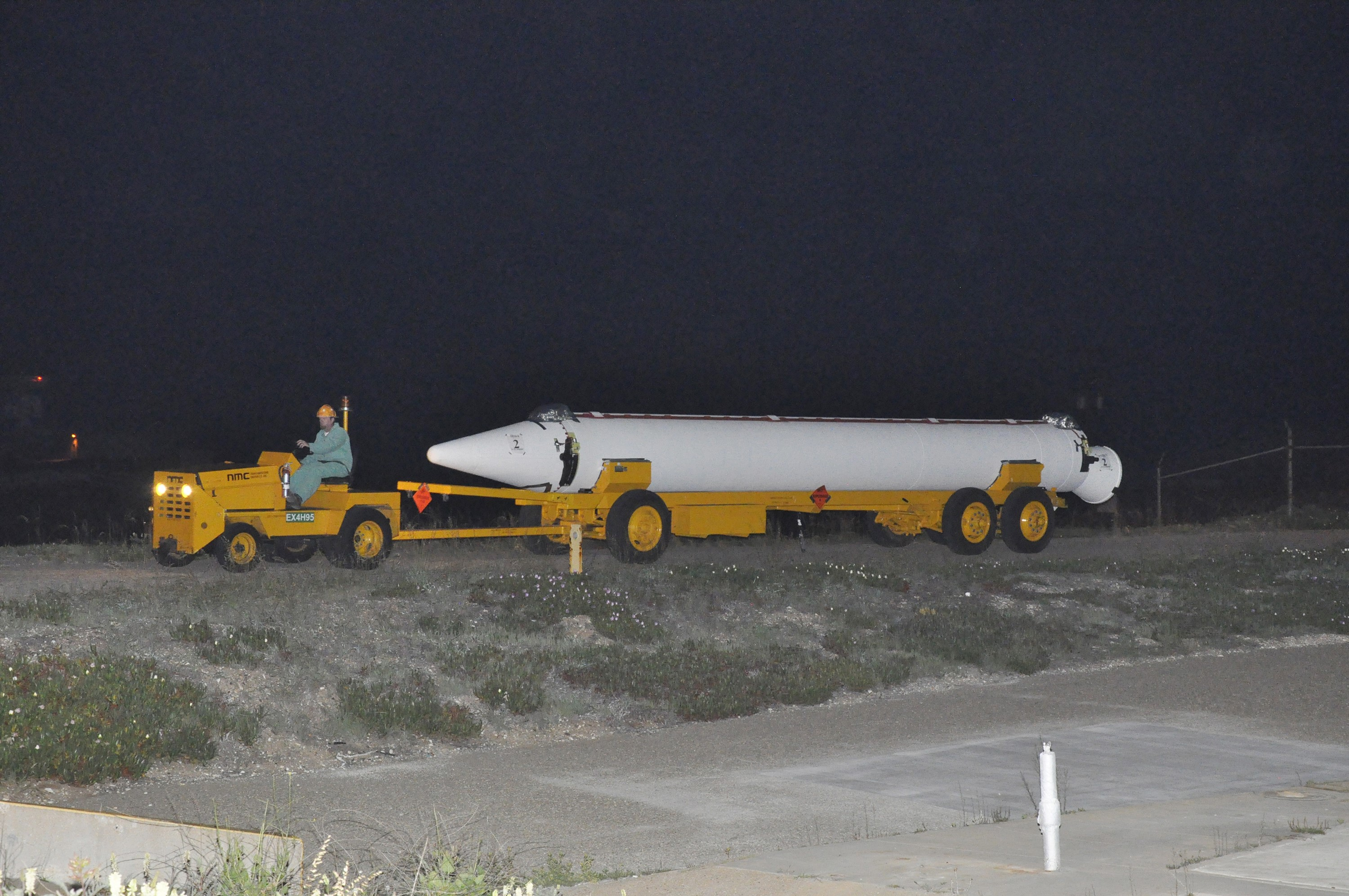
GEM 40 booster is towed to the integration facility

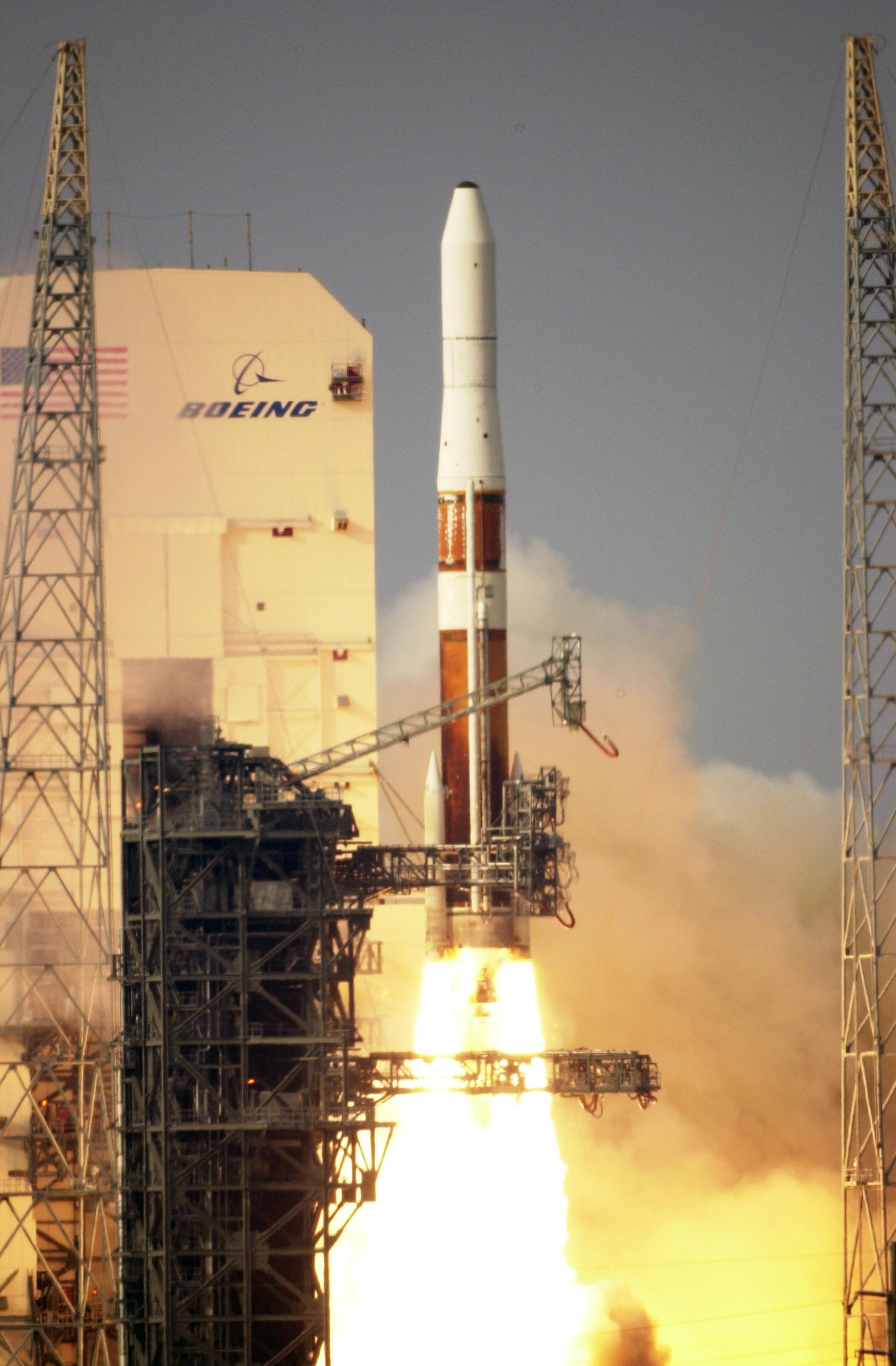
A Delta IV M+ (4,2) lifts off with 2 GEM 60 boosters

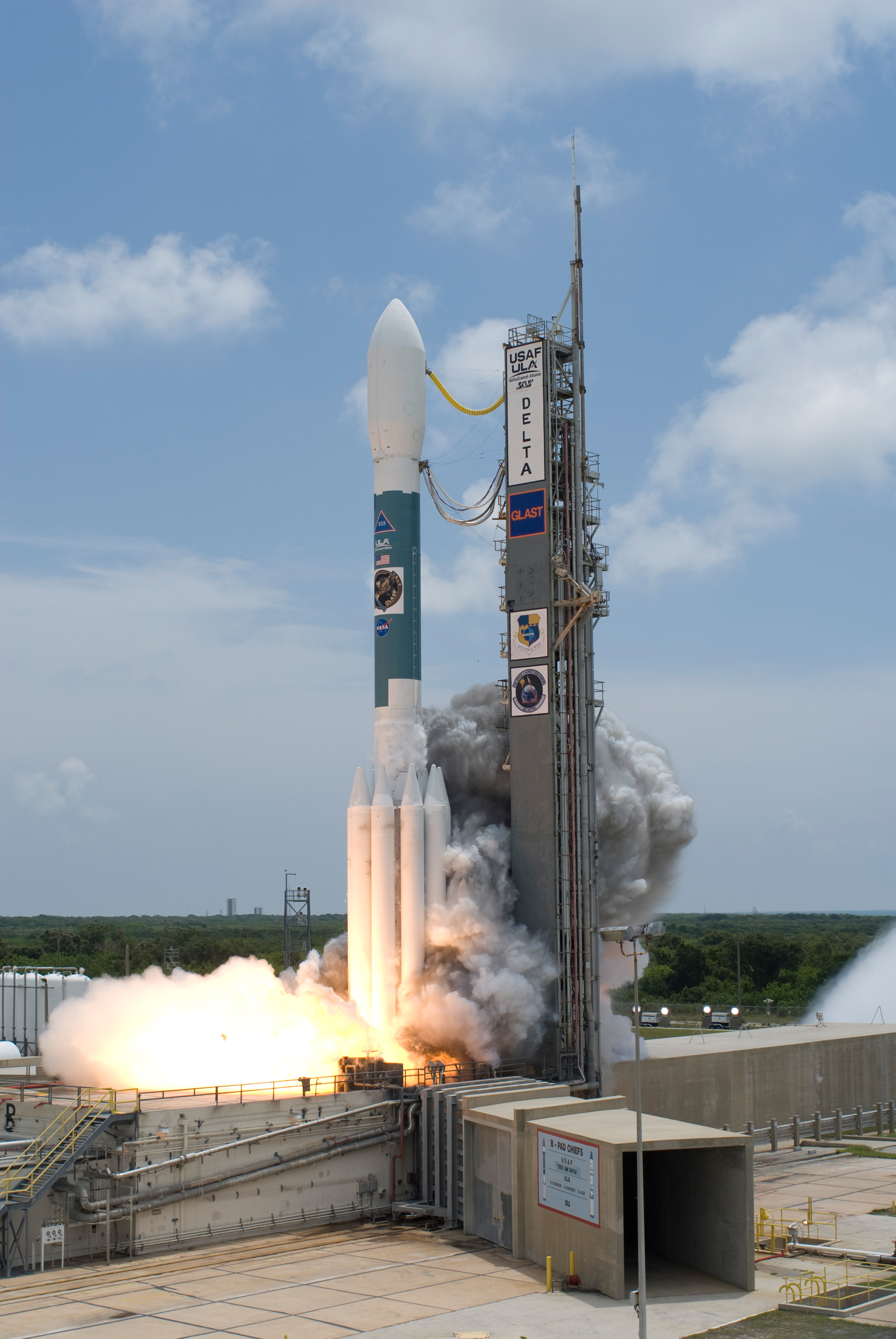
A Delta II 7920H ignites 9 GEM 46 boosters

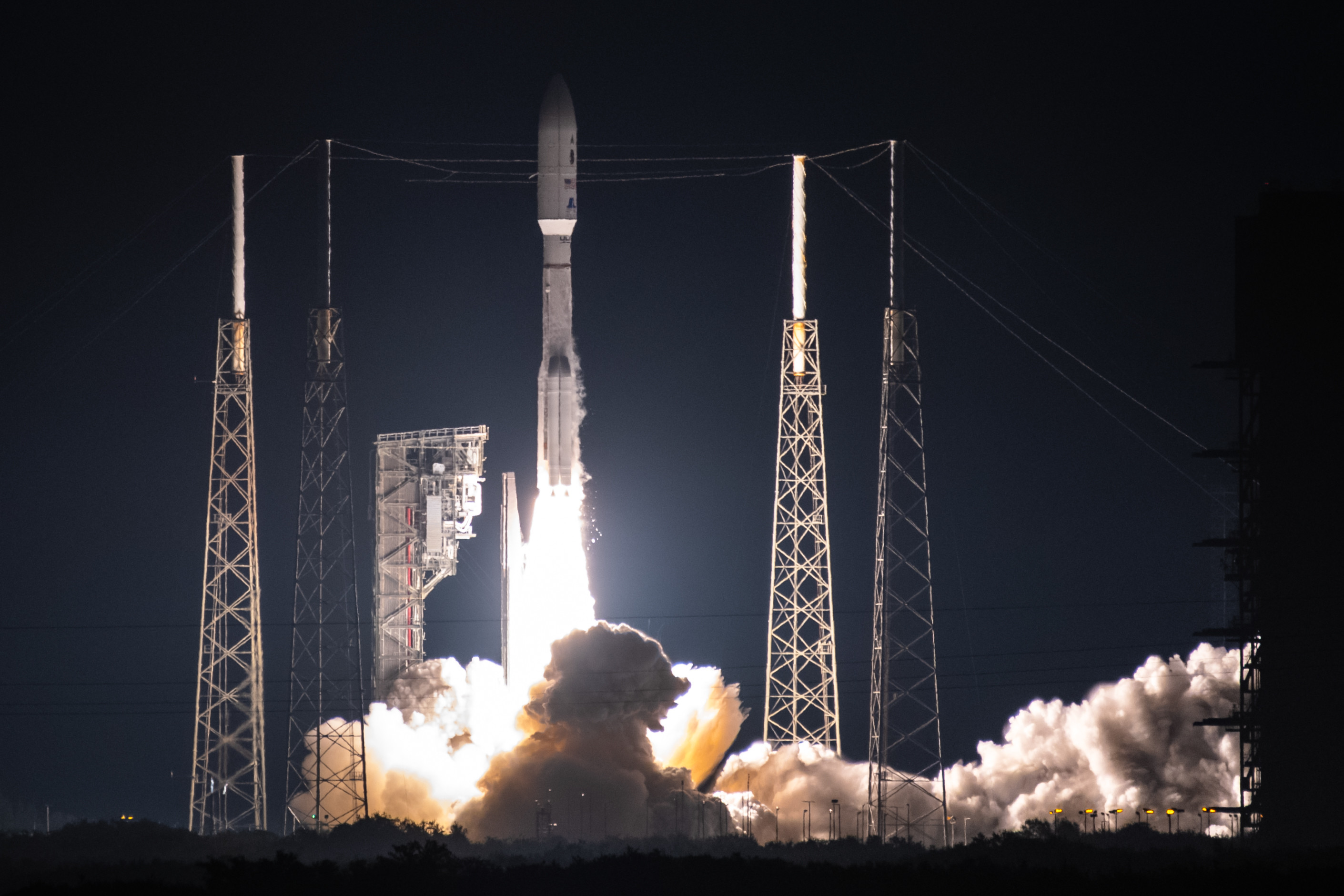
An Atlas V 541 lifts off with 4 GEM 63 boosters

== See also ==
- Solid rocket
- Spacecraft propulsion
