= USA-35 =

American navigation satellite used for GPS

- Names: Navstar 2-01; GPS II-1; GPS SVN-14
- Mission type: Navigation
- Operator: U.S. Air Force
- COSPAR ID: 1989-013A
- SATCAT no.: 19802
- Mission duration: 7.5 years (planned); 11 years (achieved)

Spacecraft properties
- Spacecraft: GPS II
- Spacecraft type: GPS Block II
- Manufacturer: Rockwell International
- Launch mass: 840 kg (1,850 lb)
- Dimensions: 5.3 m (17 ft) of long
- Power: 710 watts

Start of mission
- Launch date: 14 February 1989, 18:30 UTC
- Rocket: Delta II 6925-9.5 (Delta D184)
- Launch site: Cape Canaveral, LC-17A
- Contractor: McDonnell Douglas
- Entered service: 16 March 1989

End of mission
- Deactivated: 14 April 2000
- Last contact: 26 March 2000

Orbital parameters
- Reference system: Geocentric orbit
- Regime: Medium Earth orbit (Semi-synchronous)
- Slot: E1 (slot 1 plane E)
- Perigee altitude: 19,858 km (12,339 mi)
- Apogee altitude: 20,270 km (12,600 mi)
- Inclination: 55.1°
- Period: 713.2 minutes

USA-35, also known as Navstar 2-01, GPS II-1 and GPS SVN-14, was an American navigation satellite which formed part of the Global Positioning System. It was the first of nine Block II GPS satellites to be launched, which were the first operational GPS satellites to be launched.

== Background ==
It was one of the 21-satellite Global Positioning System (GPS) Block II series. When complete, the constellation will provide precise position data (accurate to within 16 m) to military and civilian users worldwide. Navstar signals can be received on devices as small as a telephone. The new generation Delta is 4.2 m taller and 13% more powerful than its predecessor. It can boost 3,982 kg into low Earth orbit, 1,447 kg into geotransfer orbit. The GPS II satellites, built by Rockwell International for Air Force Space Systems Division, each have a 7.5-year design life. The Air Force intends to launch a GPS II every 2 to 3 months until the constellation of 21 operational satellites and 3 spares is aloft.

== Launch ==
USA-35 was launched at 18:30 UTC on 14 February 1989, atop a Delta II launch vehicle, flight number D184, flying in the 6925–9.5 configuration. This was the maiden flight of the Delta II. The launch took place from Launch Complex 17A (LC-17A) at the Cape Canaveral Air Force Station (CCAFS), and placed USA-35 into a transfer orbit. The satellite raised itself into medium Earth orbit using a Star-37XFP apogee motor.

== Mission ==
On 16 March 1989, USA-35 was in an orbit with a perigee of 19,858 km (12,339 mi), an apogee of 20,270 km (12,600 mi), a period of 713.2 minutes, and 55.1° of inclination to the equator. The satellite had a mass of 840 kg (1,850 lb), and generated 710 watts of power. It had a design life of 7.5 years; however, it operated until 26 March 2000, when its reaction wheels failed. It was decommissioned on 14 April 2000, having been replaced by USA-150.
