= Delta II =

American space launch system (1989–2018)

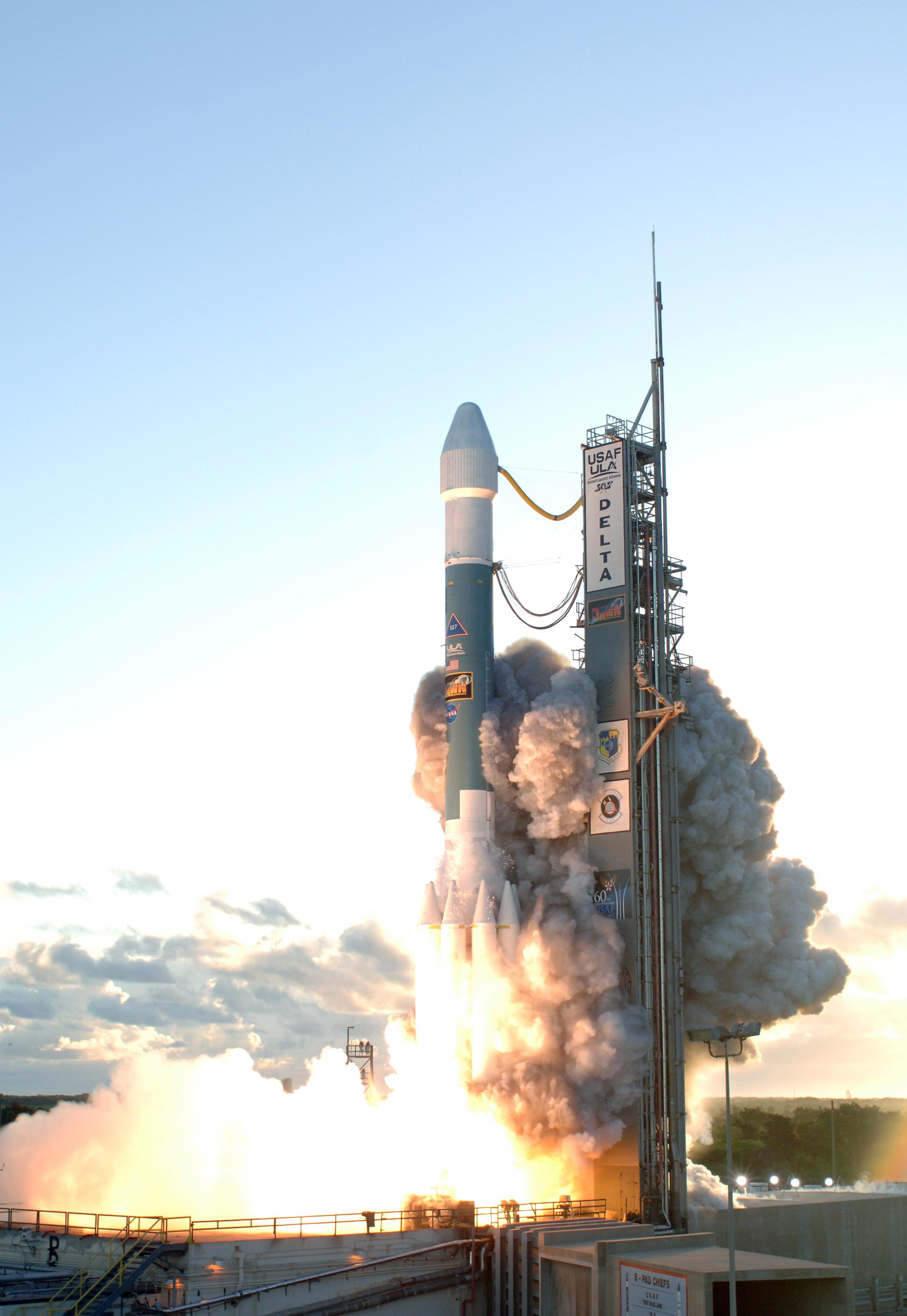
- A Delta II rocket launches from Cape Canaveral carrying the Dawn spacecraft.
- Function: Launch vehicle
- Manufacturer: McDonnell Douglas (1989–1997); Boeing Defense, Space & Security (1997–2006); United Launch Alliance (2006–2018)
- Country of origin: United States
- Cost per launch: US$51 million in 1987 (Note: (7920-10 model)); US$137 million in 2018

Size
- Height: 38.9 m (128 ft)
- Diameter: 2.44 m (8 ft)
- Mass: 152,000–286,100 kg (335,100–630,700 lb)

Capacity

Payload to LEO
- Orbital inclination: 28.7°
- Mass: 2,776–6,107 kg (6,120–13,464 lb)

Payload to GTO
- Orbital inclination: 28.7°
- Mass: 929–2,180 kg (2,048–4,806 lb)

Payload to SSO
- Orbital inclination: 98.7°
- Mass: 1,652–3,182 kg (3,642–7,015 lb)

Launch history
- Status: Retired
- Launch sites: Cape Canaveral, SLC-17; Vandenberg, SLC-2W
- Total launches: 155: Delta 6000: 17; Delta 7000: 132; Delta 7000 Heavy: 6
- Success(es): 153: Delta 6000: 17; Delta 7000: 130; Delta 7000 Heavy: 6
- Failure: 1 (Delta 7000)
- Partial failure: 1 (Delta 7000)
- First flight: Delta 6000: 14 February 1989 (USA-35); Delta 7000: 26 November 1990 (USA-66); Delta 7000 Heavy: 7 July 2003 (Opportunity rover)
- Last flight: Delta 6000: 24 July 1992 (Geotail); Delta 7000: 15 September 2018 (ICESat-2); Delta 7000 Heavy: 10 September 2011 (GRAIL)

Boosters (Delta 6000) – Castor 4A
- No. boosters: 9
- Height: 9.2 m (30 ft)
- Diameter: 1.02 m (3 ft 4 in)
- Empty mass: 1,457 kg (3,212 lb)
- Gross mass: 11,578 kg (25,525 lb)
- Powered by: Solid
- Maximum thrust: 478.3 kN (107,500 lb_{f})
- Specific impulse: 266 s (2.61 km/s)
- Burn time: 56 seconds
- Propellant: HTPB

Boosters (Delta 7000) – GEM 40
- No. boosters: 3, 4, or 9
- Height: 13.0 m (42.7 ft)
- Diameter: 1.02 m (3 ft 4 in)
- Empty mass: 1,315 kg (2,899 lb)
- Gross mass: 13,080 kg (28,840 lb)
- Powered by: Solid
- Maximum thrust: Ground-lit: 499.2 kN (112,200 lb_{f}); Air-lit: 516.2 kN (116,000 lb_{f})
- Specific impulse: Ground-lit: 274.0 s (2.687 km/s); Air-lit: 283.4 s (2.779 km/s)
- Burn time: 64 seconds
- Propellant: AP / HTPB / Al

Boosters (Delta 7000 Heavy) – GEM 46
- No. boosters: 9
- Height: 14.7 m (48 ft)
- Diameter: 1.17 m (3 ft 10 in)
- Empty mass: 2,035 kg (4,486 lb)
- Gross mass: 19,040 kg (41,980 lb)
- Powered by: Solid
- Maximum thrust: Ground-lit: 608.1 kN (136,700 lb_{f}); Air-lit: 628.5 kN (141,300 lb_{f})
- Specific impulse: Ground-lit: 224.0 s (2.197 km/s); Air-lit: 284.0 s (2.785 km/s)
- Burn time: 76 seconds or 178.03 seconds after liftoff
- Propellant: APCP / HTPB / Al

First stage – Thor/Delta XLT(-C)
- Height: 26.1 m (86 ft)
- Diameter: 2.44 m (8 ft 0 in)
- Empty mass: 5,680 kg (12,520 lb)
- Gross mass: 101,800 kg (224,400 lb)
- Powered by: 1 × RS-27 (6000 series) or RS-27A (7000 series)
- Maximum thrust: 1,054 kN (237,000 lb_{f})
- Specific impulse: 302 s (2.96 km/s)
- Burn time: 260.5 seconds
- Propellant: RP-1 / LOX

Second stage – Delta K
- Height: 6 m (20 ft)
- Diameter: 2.44 m (8 ft 0 in)
- Empty mass: 950 kg (2,090 lb)
- Gross mass: 6,954 kg (15,331 lb)
- Powered by: 1 × AJ10-118K
- Maximum thrust: 43.6 kN (9,800 lb_{f})
- Specific impulse: 319 s (3.13 km/s)
- Burn time: 431 seconds
- Propellant: N_{2}O_{4} / Aerozine 50

Third stage – PAM-D (optional)
- Powered by: 1 × Star 48B
- Maximum thrust: 66 kN (15,000 lb_{f})
- Specific impulse: 286 s (2.80 km/s)
- Burn time: 87 seconds
- Propellant: HTPB

Delta II was an expendable launch system designed and built by McDonnell Douglas, sometimes known as the Thorad Delta 1. Delta II was part of the Delta rocket family, derived from the Delta 3000, and entered service in 1989. There were two main variants, the Delta 6000 and Delta 7000, with the latter also having "Light" and "Heavy" subvariants. During its career, Delta II flew several payloads, including 24 Global Positioning System (GPS) Block II satellites, several dozen NASA payloads, and 60 Iridium communication satellites. The rocket flew its final mission, ICESat-2, on 15 September 2018, earning a streak of 100 consecutive successful missions, with the last failure being GPS IIR-1 in 1997. In the late 1990s, Delta II was developed into the unsuccessful Delta III, which was in turn developed into the more capable and successful Delta IV, though the latter shares little heritage with the original Thor and Delta rockets.

== History ==
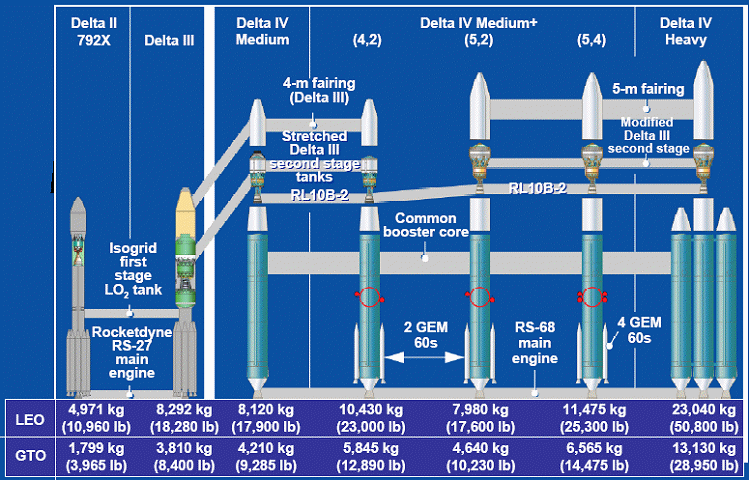
Evolution of the modern Delta rockets

In the early 1980s, all United States expendable launch vehicles were planned to be phased out in favor of the Space Shuttle, which would be responsible for all government and commercial launches. Production of Delta, Atlas-Centaur, and Titan 34D had ended. The Challenger disaster of 1986 and the subsequent halt of Shuttle operations changed this policy, and President Ronald Reagan announced in December 1986 that the Space Shuttle would no longer launch commercial payloads, and NASA would seek to purchase launches on expendable vehicles for missions that did not require crew or Shuttle support.

McDonnell Douglas, at that time the manufacturer of the Delta family, signed a contract with the U.S. Air Force in 1987 to provide seven Delta II. These were intended to launch a series of Global Positioning System (GPS) Block II satellites, which had previously been manifested for the Space Shuttle. The Air Force exercised additional contract options in 1988, expanding this order to 20 vehicles, and NASA purchased its first Delta II in 1990 for the launch of three Earth-observing satellites. The first Delta II launch occurred on 14 February 1989, with a Delta 6925 boosting the first GPS Block II satellite (USA-35) from Launch Complex 17A (SLC-17A) at Cape Canaveral into a 20,000 km (12,000 mi) high medium Earth orbit.

The first Delta II 7000-series flew on 26 November 1990, replacing the RS-27 engine of the 6000-series with the more powerful RS-27A engine. Additionally, the steel-cased Castor 4A solid boosters of the 6000-series were replaced with the composite-cased GEM 40. All further Delta II launches except three were of this upgraded configuration, and the 6000-series was retired in 1992 with the last launch being on July 24.

McDonnell Douglas began Delta III development in the mid-1990s as increasing satellite mass required more powerful launch vehicles. Delta III, with its liquid hydrogen second stage and more powerful GEM 46 boosters, could bring twice as much mass as Delta II to geostationary transfer orbit, but a string of two failures and one partial failure, along with the development of the much more powerful Delta IV, led to the cancellation of the Delta III program. The upgraded boosters would still find use on the Delta II, leading to the Delta II Heavy.

On 28 March 2003, the Air Force Space Command began the process of deactivating the Delta II launch facilities and infrastructure at Cape Canaveral once the last of the second-generation GPS satellites were launched. However, in 2008, it instead announced that it would transfer all the Delta II facilities and infrastructure to NASA to support the launch of the Gravity Recovery and Interior Laboratory (GRAIL) in 2011.

On 14 December 2006, with the launch of USA-193, was the first launch of the Delta II operated by United Launch Alliance.

The last GPS launch aboard a Delta II and the final launch from SLC-17A at Cape Canaveral occurred in 2009. The GRAIL Launch in 2011 marked the last Delta II Heavy launch and the last from Florida. The final five launches would all be from Vandenberg Air Force Base in California.

On 16 July 2012, NASA selected the Delta II to support the Orbiting Carbon Observatory (OCO-2), Soil Moisture Active Passive (SMAP), and Joint Polar Satellite System (JPSS-1 – NOAA-20) missions. This marked the final purchase of Delta II. OCO-2 was launched on 2 July 2014, Soil Moisture Active Passive (SMAP) was launched on 31 January 2015, and JPSS-1 was launched on 18 November 2017. All three of these launches were placed into orbit from SLC-2 at Vandenberg.

The Delta II family launched 155 times. Its only unsuccessful launches were Koreasat 1 in 1995, and GPS IIR-1 in 1997. The Koreasat 1 launch was a partial failure caused by one booster not separating from the first stage, which resulted in the satellite being placed in a lower-than-intended orbit. By using reserve fuel, it was able to achieve its proper geosynchronous orbit and operated for 10 years. The GPS IIR-1 was a total loss as the Delta II exploded 13 seconds after launch. The explosion occurred when a damaged solid rocket booster casing ruptured and triggered the vehicle's flight termination system. No one was injured, and the launch pad itself was not seriously impacted, though several cars were destroyed and a few buildings were damaged.

In 2007, Delta II completed its 75th consecutive successful launch, surpassing the 74 consecutive successful launches of the Ariane 4. With the launch of ICESat-2 in 2018, Delta II reached 100 consecutive successful launches.

During its career, Delta II achieved a peak launch rate of 12 launches in a single year, although its infrastructure was capable of supporting up to 15 launches per year.

While all completed Delta II rockets were launched, many flight-qualified spare parts remained in inventory. These spare parts were assembled, alongside a few structural simulators, to create a nearly complete Delta II for exhibition in its 7320-10C configuration. The rocket is displayed vertically at the Kennedy Space Center Visitor Complex, and bears its popular "shark teeth" livery on its fairing, which was painted on past Delta II rockets for the GPS launches.

== Vehicle description ==
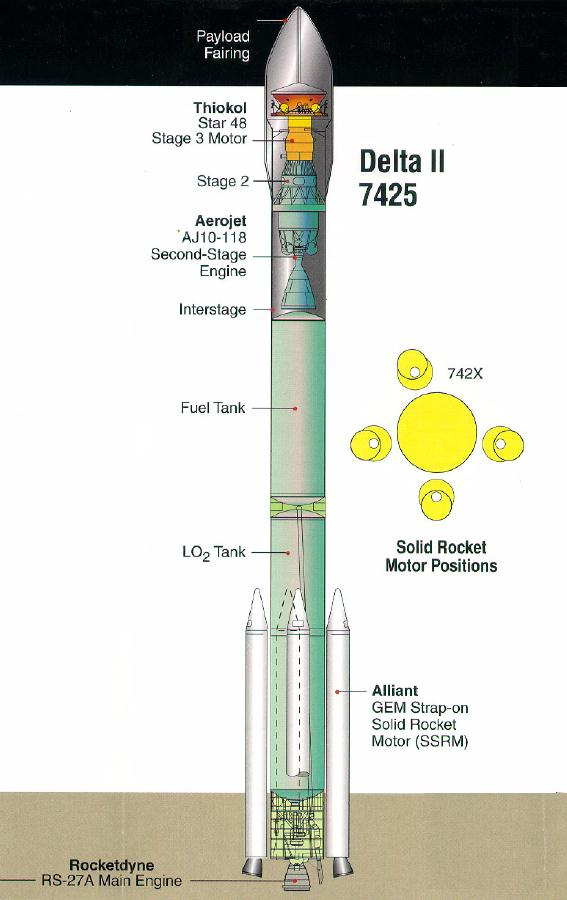
Delta II 7425 diagram

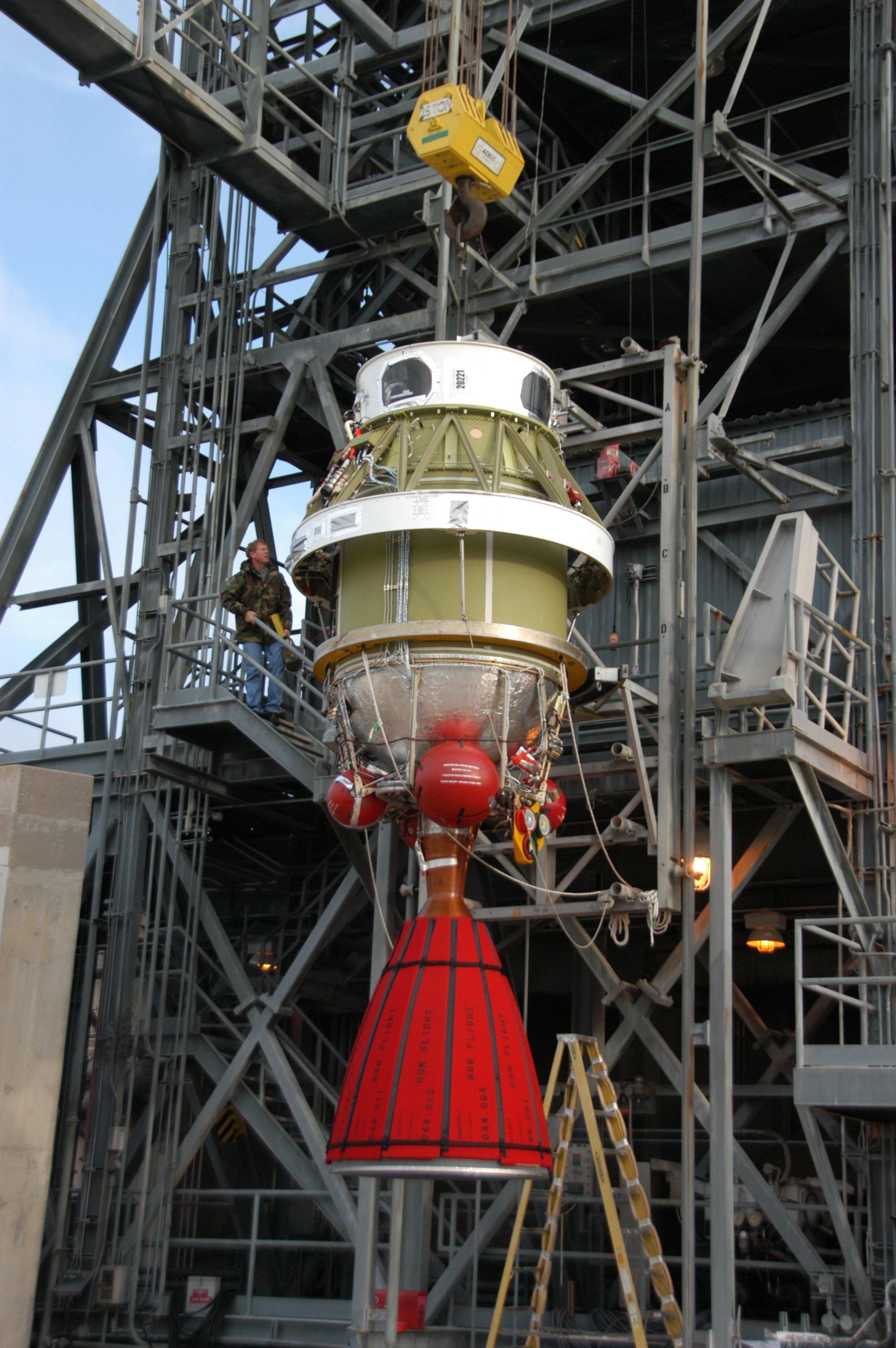
A Delta-K stage

=== First stage ===
The first stage of the Delta II was propelled by a Rocketdyne RS-27 or RS-27A main engine burning RP-1 and liquid oxygen. This stage was technically referred to as the "Extra-Extended Long Tank Thor", a derivative of the Thor ballistic missile as were all Delta rockets until the Delta IV. The RS-27 used on the 6000-series Delta II produced 915 kN (206,000 lbf) of thrust, while the upgraded RS-27A used by the 7000-series produced 1,054 kN (237,000 lbf). The stage was 26.1 meters (86 ft) long and 2.44 meters (8.0 ft) wide, had a mass of 101.8 tonnes (224,000 lb) when fueled, and burned for 260 seconds. The main engine, which could not throttle, provided pitch and yaw control for the vehicle during ascent using hydraulic gimballing. In addition, two Rocketdyne LR-101-NA-11 vernier engines provided roll control for the first stage during ascent and continued firing after the main engine shut down to stabilize the vehicle before stage separation.

The two first-stage tanks were constructed from aluminum isogrid panels, providing high strength at a lower mass. Nitrogen gas was used to pressurize the tanks. These tanks were stretched a total of 148 inches (3.8 m) from those of the Extended Long Tank Thor that flew on older Delta rockets, providing more propellant. Between the two tanks was the "center body", where first-stage avionics and communications equipment were housed. The solid rocket booster attachment points were located on the outside of the liquid oxygen tank and the aft skirt, the latter of which also contained a gyroscope for vehicle stability.

=== Solid rocket boosters ===
For additional thrust during launch, the Delta II used solid boosters. For the 6000-series, Delta II used Castor 4A boosters (sometimes stylized as "Castor IVA"), while the 7000-series used GEM 40 Graphite-Epoxy Motors manufactured by Alliant Techsystems (ATK). Like its predecessors, the Delta II 6000-series was only offered in nine-booster configurations. However, with the arrival of the 7000-series, variants with three and four boosters were introduced to allow Delta II to fly small payloads for cheaper. When three or four boosters were used, all ignited on the ground at launch, while models that used nine boosters would ignite six on the ground, then the remaining three would ignite in flight after the burnout and jettison of the first six.

The Castor 4A boosters were an improvement over the Castor 4 motors flown on the earlier Delta 3000 rocket, replacing the propellant with more modern HTPB-based propellant and providing an 11% increase in performance. The GEM 40 boosters on the 7000-series further improved Delta II's performance by each featuring 2.5 tonnes (5,500 lb) of extra propellant than the Castor 4A thanks to a lengthening of 3 meters (9.8 ft). In addition, the GEM boosters also boasted a lower dry mass than the Castors due to the former's carbon composite construction.

In 2003, the Delta II Heavy debuted, featuring larger GEM 46 motors from the abandoned Delta III program. These new motors allowed the vehicle to carry over 1,000 kg (2,200 lb) of extra payload into low-Earth orbit. Only Cape Canaveral Space Launch Complex 17B was capable of flying the Heavy configuration, as it was previously reinforced to handle the Delta III.

The Castor motor nozzles were angled 11° from vertical to aim their thrust into the vehicle's center of gravity, while the GEM motors had a slightly lower 10° tilt. On the nine-engine configuration, the three air-lit motors featured longer nozzles to allow the boosters to perform better in the upper atmosphere. All solid motors that flew on the Delta II featured fixed nozzles, meaning the first stage was solely responsible for vehicle control during the initial portions of the flight.

=== Delta-K second stage ===
The second stage of Delta II was the Delta-K, powered by a restartable (up to six restarts) Aerojet AJ10-118K engine burning hypergolic Aerozine-50 and N_{2}O_{4}. These propellants are highly toxic and corrosive, and once loaded the launch had to occur within approximately 37 days or the stage would have to be refurbished or replaced. This stage also contained a combined inertial platform and guidance system that controlled all flight events.

The Delta-K consisted of stainless steel tanks and a lightweight aluminum structure. The tanks were pressurized with helium gas, and the stage featured nitrogen thrusters for roll control during burns and for complete attitude control during coasts. The stage had a mass of 950 kg (2,090 lb) when empty, and 6,954 kg (15,331 lb) when fully fueled.

=== Third stage ===
For low Earth orbit missions, Delta II was not equipped with a third stage. Payloads bound for higher energy orbits such as GTO or to reach Earth escape velocity for trans-Mars injection or other destinations beyond Earth used an HTPB solid propellant third stage, situated inside the fairing during launch. This stage was spin-stabilized and depended on the second stage for proper orientation prior to stage separation, but was sometimes equipped with a hydrazine nutation control system to maintain proper spin axis. The third stage would be spun up using small rocket motors and then released by the second stage to perform its burn. The third stage also included a yo-weight system to induce tumbling in the stage after payload separation to prevent recontact, or a yo-yo de-spin mechanism to slow the rotation before payload release. The stage would also contain an S-band transmitter, batteries, and a sequencer to command the stage events.

Two third-stage options were available, both consisting of a single solid rocket motor. The most common by far was Star 48, flying on over 70 missions. The Star 48, also referred to as the Payload Assist Module-Delta (PAM-D, PAM-Delta), was the more, powerful of the two options, producing an average thrust of about 66.4 kN (14,900 lb_{f}) during its 87.1 seconds of burn time. The stage would end up flying primarily on the more powerful Delta variants and never flew on the three-booster configuration.

The other third-stage option was Star 37FM. This stage flew four times, and only on three- and four-booster configurations of Delta. Star 37FM produced about 45.8 kN (10,300 lb_{f}) of thrust during its 66.4-second burn.

== Naming system ==
The Delta II family used a four-digit system to generate its technical names:

- The first digit was either 6 or 7, denoting the 6000- or 7000-series Delta;
- The second digit indicated the number of boosters. Most Delta II rockets flew with 9 boosters, but some flew with 3 or 4;
- The third digit was always 2, denoting a second stage with an Aerojet AJ10 engine. Only Deltas prior to the 6000-series used a different engine, the TR-201;
- The last digit denoted the third stage. 0 denoted no third stage, 5 indicated a Payload Assist Module (PAM) stage with Star 48B being used, and 6 indicated it used the Star 37FM motor for a PAM.
- An H following the four digits denoted that the vehicle used larger Delta III GEM 46 boosters. The Heavy variant could be launched only from Cape Canaveral (as Vandenberg's pad wasn't modified to handle the larger SRBs) and was retired with the closure of that launch site in 2011;
- Numbers and letters following those indicate the type of fairing. -9.5 means that the vehicle had a 9.5 ft (2.9 m) diameter fairing, -10 means an aluminum 10 ft (3.0 m) diameter fairing, -10C means a composite 10 ft (3.0 m) diameter fairing, and -10L indicates a lengthened 10 ft (3.0 m) diameter composite fairing. In some early Delta II flights, a fairing, about 8-feet in diameter (from older Delta rockets) was flown, and those vehicles had the -8 designation.

For example, a Delta 7925H-10L used the RS-27A, nine GEM 46 boosters, a PAM third stage, and a lengthened 10 ft (3.0 m) diameter fairing. A Delta 6320–9.5 is a two-stage vehicle with an RS-27 first-stage engine, three Castor 4A boosters, a 9.5 ft (2.9 m) diameter fairing, and no third stage.

== Launch profile ==
Launch vehicle build-up
A Delta II launch vehicle was assembled vertically on the launch pad. Assembly started by hoisting the first stage into position. The solid rocket boosters were then hoisted into position and mated with the first stage. Launch vehicle build-up then continued with the second stage being hoisted atop the first stage.

Fueling
It took approximately 20 minutes to load the first stage with 37,900 L (10,000 U.S. gal) of fuel.

At T-45 minutes, fueling completion was confirmed. At T-20 minutes, the FTS pyros were armed. At T-20 minutes and T-4 minutes, two built-in holds occurred. During these holds, final launch checkouts were performed. At T-11 seconds SRB igniters were armed. Ignition of the main engine was at T-0.4 seconds. The ascent profile varies between missions.

SRB staging
If nine solid rocket boosters were used, only six were ignited at launch. After about a minute, once the first six were depleted, three air-start motors would ignite for another minute and the ground-start motors would separate. The air-start motors had nozzles optimized for high-altitude as they operated mostly in a near-vacuum during the flight.

If only three or four boosters were used, all were ignited on the ground and jettisoned at the same time.

== Delta II launches ==
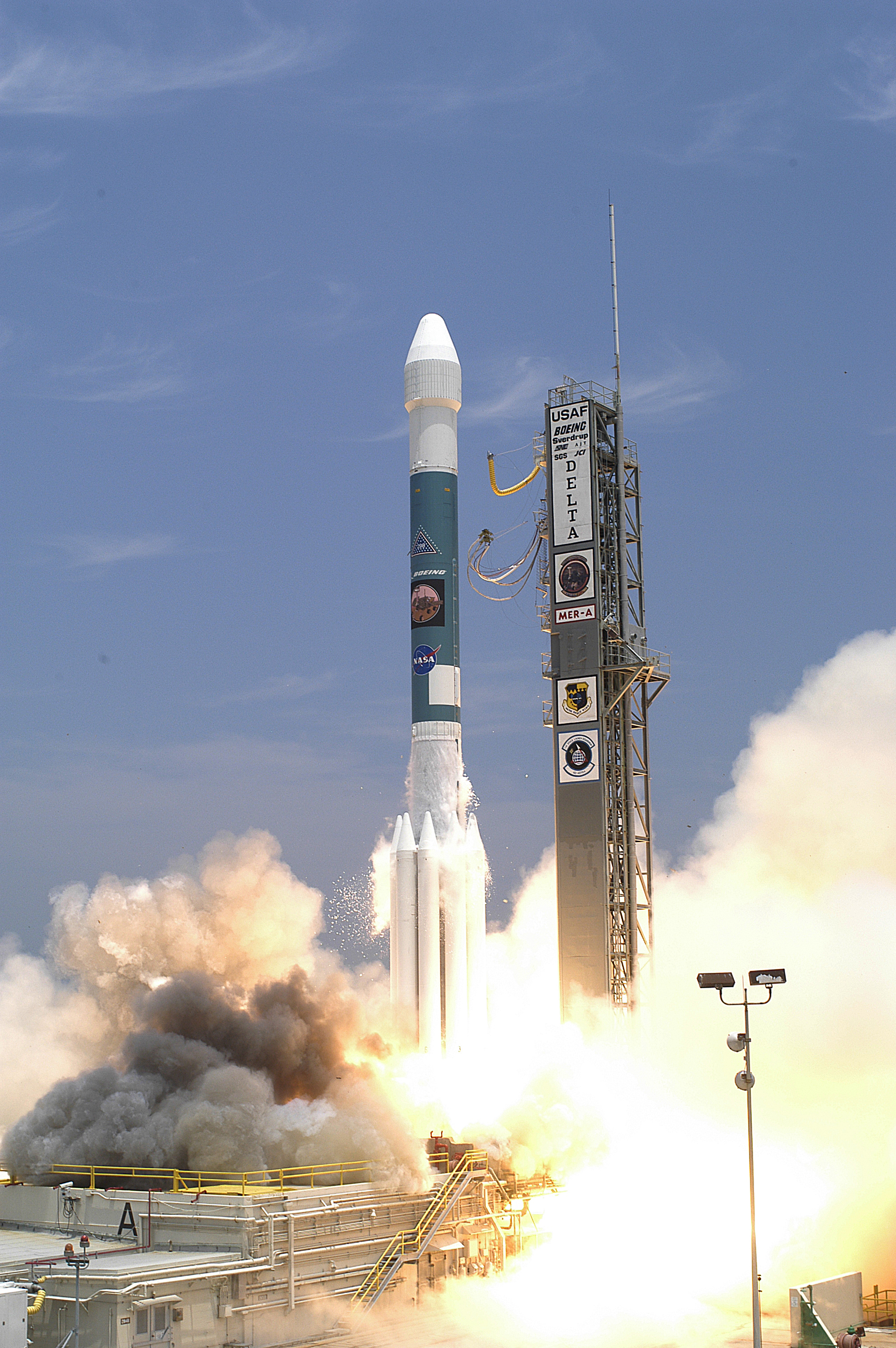
Delta II lifting off with MER-A on 10 June 2003

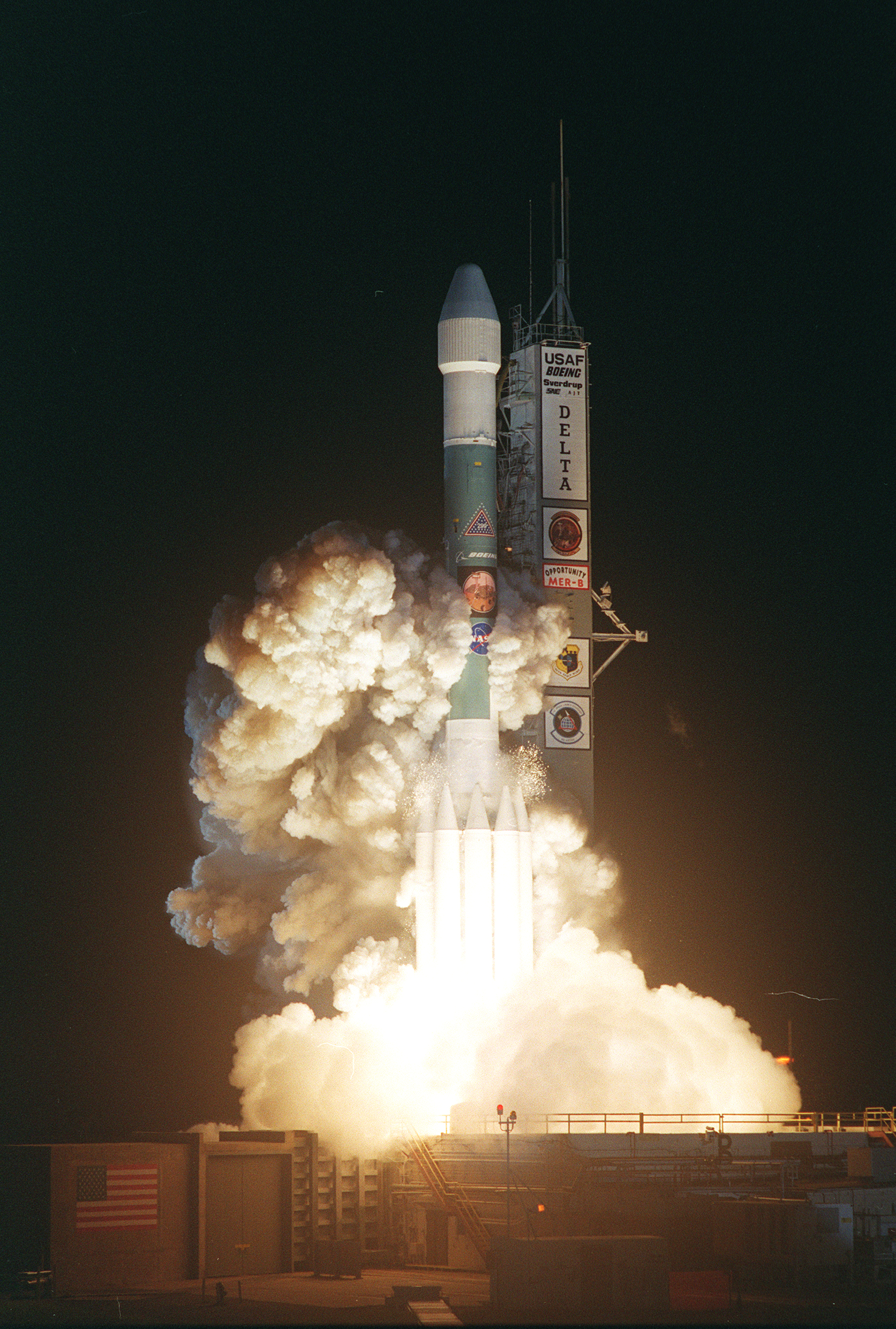
Delta II Heavy (7925H-9.5) lifting off from pad 17-B carrying MER-B

=== Notable payloads ===
Earth-orbiting

- GLAST
- Gravity Probe B
- 24 GPS satellites
- 60 Iridium satellites
- ICESat-2
- OSTM/Jason-2
- Radarsat-1
- ELFIN
- Polar (satellite)
- ROSAT
- STSS-ATRR
- Swift
- THEMIS
- USA 193 (NROL-21)
- WIND
- WISE
- WMAP
- Geotail

Interplanetary

- 2001 Mars Odyssey
- CONTOUR
- Dawn
- Deep Impact
- Deep Space 1
- Genesis
- GRAIL
- Mars Climate Orbiter
- Mars Exploration Rovers
- Mars Global Surveyor
- Mars Pathfinder
- Mars Phoenix
- Mars Polar Lander
- MESSENGER
- NEAR
- Spitzer Space Telescope (SIRTF)
- Kepler Space Telescope
- STEREO

The last Delta II launch was the ICESat-2 satellite in September 2018.

In 2008, ULA indicated that it had "around half a dozen" unsold Delta II rockets on hand, and by October 2017, ULA CEO Tory Bruno stated that there were no complete Delta II rockets left in ULA inventory.

There were some unused Delta II components, but not enough to build another vehicle. A Delta II, made of these leftover parts alongside some simulated parts, is located at the Kennedy Space Center rocket garden.

== Comparable rockets ==
- Antares
- Ariane 4 (retired)
- GSLV – Class of Indian medium-lift expendable launch vehicles, developed by ISRO
- Long March 4B
- PSLV – Indian expendable launch vehicle
- Soyuz
- Tsyklon-3 – Soviet / Russian launch vehicle (retired)
- Vega – European Space Agency launch system

== Space debris ==
The only person on record ever hit by space debris, Lottie Williams, was hit by a small, light piece of a Delta II rocket. Williams was exercising in a park in Tulsa, Oklahoma on 22 January 1997 when she was hit in the shoulder by a 15-centimeter (6 in) piece of blackened metallic material. The U.S. Space Command confirmed that a used Delta II rocket from the April 1996 launch of the Midcourse Space Experiment had crashed into the atmosphere 30 minutes earlier. The object tapped her on the shoulder and fell off harmlessly onto the ground. Williams collected the item and NASA tests later showed that the fragment was consistent with the materials of the rocket, and Nicholas Johnson, the agency's chief scientist for orbital debris, believes that she was, indeed hit by a piece of a recently launched Delta II.

Delta rockets have been involved in multiple fragmentation events as they were routinely left in orbit with enough fuel to explode. A large amount of current "space junk" is Delta rocket debris.

== See also ==
- Comparison of orbital launchers families
- Comparison of orbital launch systems
