= Delta III =

Space launch vehicle

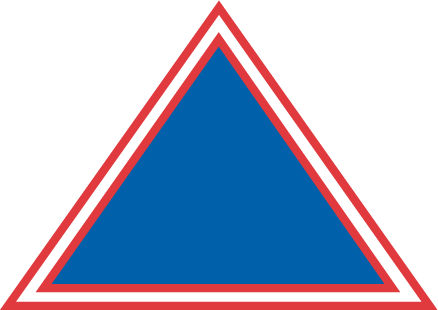

- Delta III rocket diagram
- Function: Orbital launch vehicle
- Manufacturer: Boeing (design, manufacturing and assembly); Mitsubishi Heavy Industries (RP-1 tank and upper stage manufacturing); NASDA (upper stage design); Contraves/ESA (fairing and payload adapters)
- Country of origin: United States

Size
- Height: 35 m (115 ft)
- Diameter: 4 m (13 ft)
- Mass: 301,450 kg (664,580 lb)
- Stages: 2 or 3

Capacity

Payload to LEO
- Mass: 8,290 kg (18,280 lb)

Payload to GTO
- Mass: 3,810 kg (8,400 lb)

Associated rockets
- Family: Delta

Launch history
- Status: Retired
- Launch sites: Cape Canaveral, SLC-17B
- Total launches: 3
- Success(es): 0
- Failure: 2
- Partial failure: 1
- First flight: 26 August 1998
- Last flight: 23 August 2000

Boosters – GEM 46
- No. boosters: 9
- Maximum thrust: 628.3 kN (141,200 lb_{f})
- Specific impulse: 273 seconds (2.68 km/s)
- Burn time: 75 seconds
- Propellant: AP / HTPB / Al

First stage
- Powered by: 1 × RS-27A
- Maximum thrust: 1,085.79 kN (244,100 lb_{f})
- Specific impulse: 254 seconds (2.49 km/s)
- Burn time: 260 seconds
- Propellant: LOX/RP-1

Second stage – DCSS
- Powered by: 1 × RL10B
- Maximum thrust: 110.03 kN (24,740 lb_{f})
- Specific impulse: 462 seconds (4.53 km/s)
- Burn time: 700 seconds
- Propellant: LOX / LH2

Third stage (Optional) – Star 48B
- Maximum thrust: 66.723 kN (15,000 lb_{f})
- Specific impulse: 286 seconds (2.80 km/s)
- Burn time: 87 seconds
- Propellant: HTPB

Delta III was an expendable launch vehicle made by McDonnell Douglas (later acquired by Boeing). Development was canceled before the vehicle became operational. The vehicle is the third generation of the Delta rocket family, developed from the highly successful Delta II to help meet the launch demand of larger satellites. While the Delta III never had a successful launch, some of the technologies developed were used in its successor, the Delta IV.

The Delta III was the first to use the Delta Cryogenic Second Stage, which was designed by the National Space Development Agency of Japan based on the second stage it developed for the H-IIA rocket and built by Mitsubishi Heavy Industries. Contraves built the fairing and payload adapters based on designs it used on the Ariane 4.

The first Delta III launch was on August 26, 1998. Of its three flights, the first two were failures, and the third, though declared successful, reached the low end of its targeted orbit range and carried only a dummy (inert) payload. The Delta III could deliver up to 3,810 kilograms (8,400 lb) to geostationary transfer orbit, twice the payload of its predecessor, the Delta II. Under the four-digit designation system from earlier Delta rockets, the Delta III is classified as the Delta 8930.

== History ==
Due to the continual size and mass growth of commercial satellites in the late 1980s, McDonnell Douglas realized the need for a higher-performance rocket than even their new Delta II. New satellite bus offerings from Hughes required a launch vehicle with a 4-meter diameter payload faring as well as the ability to send 3.5 tons of payload to a geostationary transfer orbit – neither of which Delta II offered.

Multiple options for evolving the Delta II to support larger payloads were considered in the late 1980s and early 1990s, namely using higher-performing liquid hydrogen/liquid oxygen upper stages. Eventually, the Delta III was announced in 1995, boasting an evolved Delta II first stage and a second stage based on that of the Japanese H-II rocket. This led to Delta III being similar in size to Delta II, meaning that the existing Delta II infrastructure at SLC-17B could be used after some modifications. Soon after the announcement, Hughes placed an order for 13 Delta III launches.

Delta III would only fly three times. The first two launches, both carrying live satellites, ended in failure. The third and final launch, carrying a dummy payload, was only partially successful after the RL-10B second-stage engine shut down prematurely. After commercial interest declined, the Delta III program was officially ended in 2003. Boeing then transitioned their focus to the new Delta IV rocket, which was much more capable than Delta III.

Multiple Delta III rockets were already built and would have been unused, but they were cannibalized for parts for both Delta II and Delta IV.

== Description ==
Delta III was developed from the Delta II rocket. The new vehicle sported a modified first stage and a new, more efficient upper stage. This led to Delta III having around double the payload capacity of Delta II. However, the consecutive failures of the initial Delta IIIs, combined with the more advanced Delta IV program and the continuing success of the Delta II, left the Delta III as an interim vehicle.

=== First stage ===
Like the Delta II, the first stage of the Delta III burned kerosene and liquid oxygen and was powered by one Rocketdyne RS-27A main engine with two LR-101-NA-11 vernier engines for roll control. The vernier engines were also used for attitude control after the main engine shut down, just before the second stage separated. While the propellant load and gross mass of the stage were nearly identical to the Delta II, the diameter of the kerosene tank was increased from 2.4 meters to 4 meters, while its height was reduced. The liquid oxygen tank and engine section remained largely unchanged. The redesigned kerosene tank reduced the overall length of the stage and, combined with the increased height of the second stage, allowed Delta III to use the same launch facilities as Delta II with only minor modifications.

The first stage thrust was augmented by nine GEM-46 solid rocket boosters, sometimes referred to as GEM LDXL (Large Diameter Extended Length). These were 14.7 m (48 ft) meters in length, 1.2 m (46 inches) in diameter, and had a mass of 19 metric tons each, about six metric tons more than the Delta II's standard GEM-40 motors. Six were ignited on the launch pad, while the remaining three were ignited just before burnout and separation of the ground-lit boosters. To maintain steering authority, three of the ground-lit boosters had vectoring nozzles. GEM-46 boosters would later find use on Delta II, creating the Delta II Heavy variant.

=== Delta Cryogenic Second Stage ===
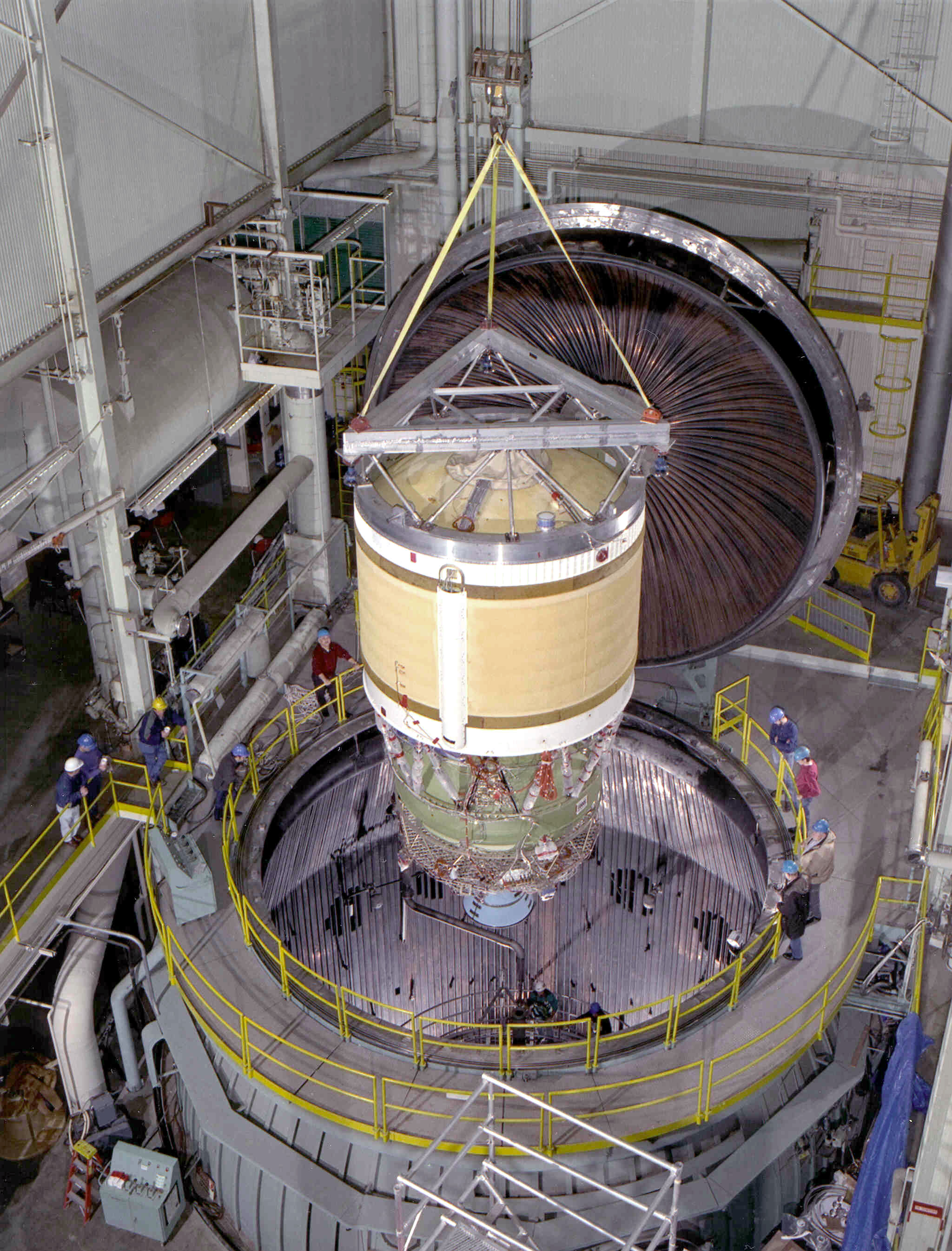
A Delta III DCSS upper stage undergoing testing at Plum Brook Field Station in January 1998

The second stage of the Delta III was the newly developed Delta Cryogenic Second Stage (DCSS), which burned liquid hydrogen and liquid oxygen. It was developed and manufactured partly by Mitsubishi Heavy Industries and was based on the second stage of JAXA's H-IIA rocket. Boeing was in charge of preliminary design and the development of new technologies, while Mitsubishi Heavy Industries was responsible for manufacturing. The liquid hydrogen tank was 4 m (13 ft) meters in diameter while the separate liquid oxygen tank (attached by a truss to the bottom of the hydrogen tank) was around 3 m (9.8 ft) meters in diameter. This stage offered significantly better performance than the Delta II's second stage, the Delta-K, which burned hypergolic propellants. The DCSS was powered by a Pratt & Whitney RL10B-2 engine, derived from the RL10 powering the Centaur upper stage but featuring electromechanical actuators for gimbal control and an extending nozzle for increased performance. After Delta III's retirement, the DCSS design was modified for use as the Delta IV's second stage in both the original 4-meter diameter form factor as well as a larger 5-meter diameter stage. A further refinement of the 5-meter diameter DCSS, known as the Interim Cryogenic Propulsion Stage, is used on the Block I Space Launch System rocket.

Control of the second stage was provided by 4 sets of hydrazine thrusters installed around the bottom of the liquid oxygen tank. During engine burns, these thrusters only provided roll control (as the engine itself could gimbal for pitch and yaw). During coast periods, these would then provide 3-axis control.

=== Star 48B third stage ===
Delta III was offered with an optional Star 48B solid-fueled third stage. It would have been attached on top of the DCSS and contained inside the payload fairing. The Star 48B would have been used for high-energy orbits, like geostationary or interplanetary missions. It was never flown on Delta III but was commonly used on Delta II missions. The Star 48B has also seen use on Delta IV and Atlas V.

=== Payload fairing ===
Delta III's payload fairing was a new composite design, matching the upper stage hydrogen tank's 4 m (13 ft) diameter and allowing larger payloads than the Delta II's 9.5 or 10-foot-diameter fairing. Delta III's 4-meter fairing was derived from Delta II's 10 ft composite fairing. This fairing design would later be repurposed on the Delta IV Medium.

== Launches ==
Flight Number	Date / time (UTC)	Rocket Configuration	Launch site	Payload	Payload mass	Orbit	Customer	Launch outcome
1	August 27, 1998; 01:17	Delta III 8930	CCAFS SLC-17B	Galaxy 10	700 kg (1,500 lb)	GTO	PanAmSat / Intelsat	Failure
1	Maiden flight of Delta III. Destroyed by range safety after control problems and depletion of hydraulic fluid. Communications satellite.							
2	May 5, 1999; 01:00	Delta III 8930	CCAFS SLC-17B	Orion 3	4,300 kg (9,500 lb)	GTO	Loral	Failure
2	Second stage engine failure. Payload placed in low Earth orbit, declared too low and Loral called satellite lost. Communications satellite.							
3	August 23, 2000; 11:05	Delta III 8930	CCAFS SLC-17B	DM-F3	4,383 kg (9,663 lb)	GTO	US Air Force	Partial failure
3	Reached lower than planned orbit. Final flight of Delta III. Payload was a DemoSat.							

== See also ==
- Comparison of orbital launchers families
