= Solid rocket booster =

Solid propellant motor used to augment the thrust of a rocket

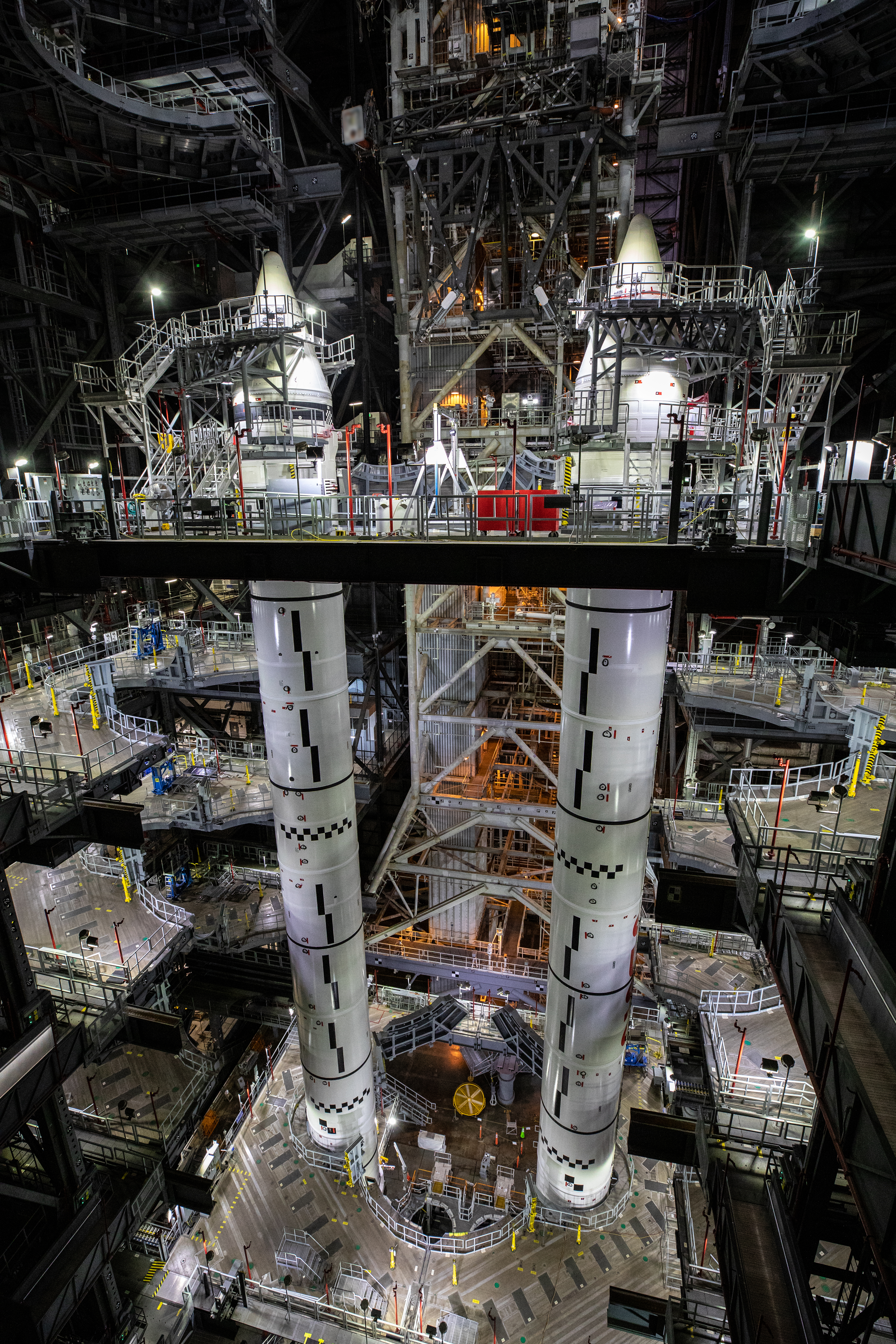
SLS's solid rocket boosters

A solid rocket booster (SRB) is a solid propellant motor used to provide thrust in spacecraft launches from initial launch through the first ascent. Many launch vehicles, including the Atlas V, Space Launch System (SLS) and Space Shuttle, have used SRBs to give launch vehicles much of the thrust required to place the vehicle into orbit.

The Space Shuttle used two Space Shuttle SRBs, which were the largest solid propellant motors ever built until the SLS and the first designed for recovery and reuse. The propellant for each solid rocket motor on the Space Shuttle weighed approximately 500,000 kilograms.

== Advantages ==
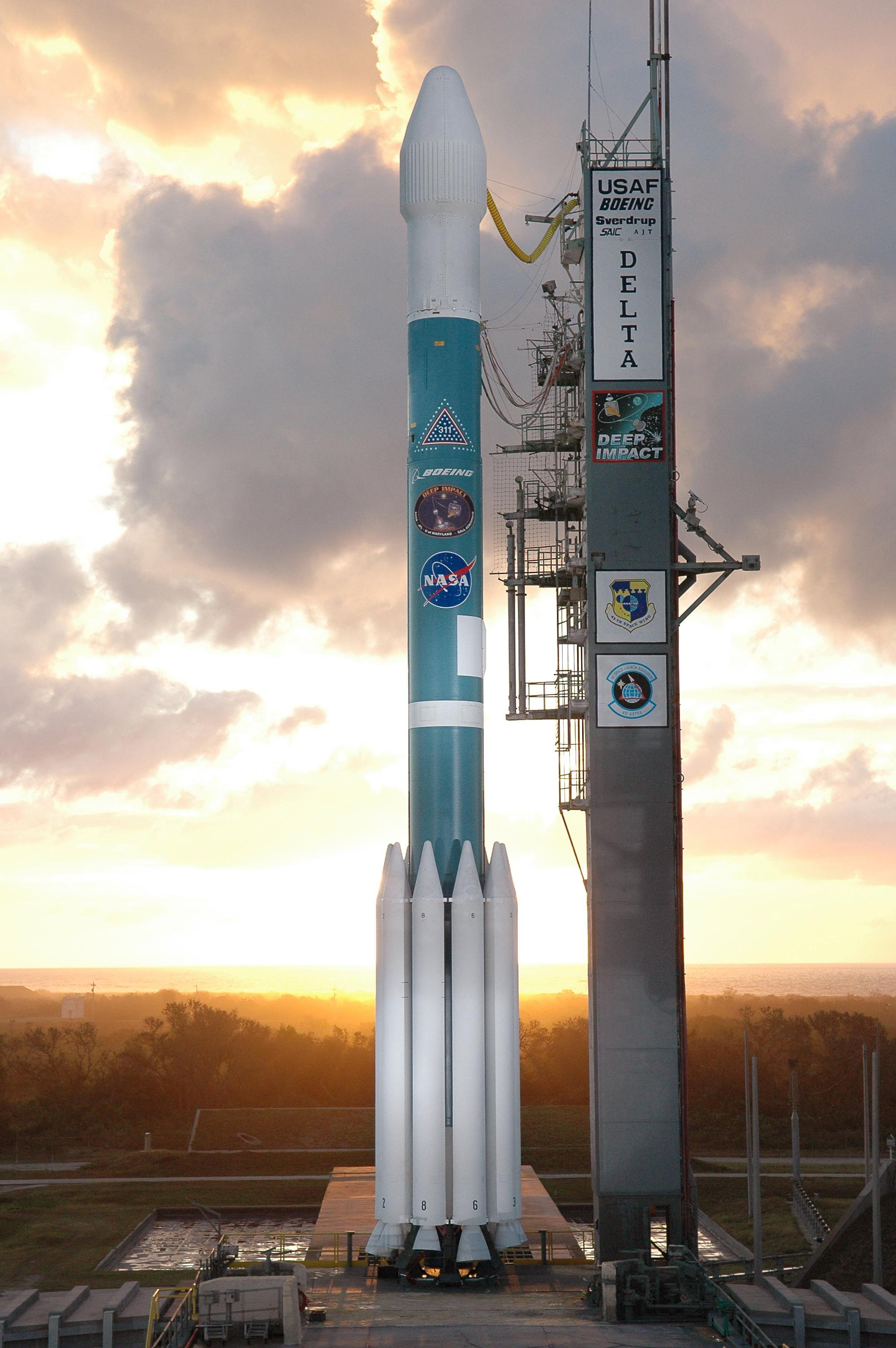
Delta II with nine solid rocket boosters

Compared to liquid propellant rockets, the solid-propellant motors (SRMs) have been capable of providing large amounts of thrust with a relatively simple design. They provide greater thrust without significant refrigeration and insulation requirements, and produce large amounts of thrust for their size. Adding detachable SRBs to a vehicle also powered by liquid-propelled rockets known as staging reduces the amount of liquid propellant needed and lowers the launch rig mass. Solid boosters are cheaper to design, test, and produce in the long run compared to the equivalent liquid propellant boosters. Reusability of components across multiple flights, as in the Shuttle assembly, also has decreased hardware costs.

One example of increased performance provided by SRBs is the Ariane 4 rocket. The basic 40 model with no additional boosters was capable of lifting a 4,795 lb (2,175 kg) payload to geostationary transfer orbit. The 44P model with 4 solid boosters has a payload of 7,639 lb (3,465 kg) to the same orbit.

== Disadvantages ==
Solid propellant boosters are not controllable and must generally burn until exhaustion after ignition, unlike liquid propellant or cold-gas propulsion systems. However, launch abort systems and range safety destruct systems can attempt to cut off propellant flow by using shaped charges. As of 1986 estimates for SRB failure rates have ranged from 1 in 1,000 to 1 in 100,000. SRB assemblies have failed suddenly and catastrophically. Nozzle blocking or deformation can lead to overpressure or a reduction in thrust, while defects in the booster's casing or stage couplings can cause the assembly to break apart by increasing aerodynamic stresses. Additional failure modes include bore choking and combustion instability. Failure of an O-ring seal on the Challenger space shuttle's right solid rocket booster led to its disintegration shortly after liftoff.

Solid rocket motors can present a handling risk on the ground, as a fully fueled booster carries a risk of accidental ignition. Such an accident occurred in the August 2003 Brazilian rocket explosion at the Brazilian Centro de Lançamento de Alcântara VLS rocket launch pad, killing 21 technicians.

== Launchers that use solid rocket boosters ==
Some launchers use a fixed number of boosters:

- Space Launch System: two (SLS Solid Rocket Boosters, five-segment)
- Space Shuttle: two (Space Shuttle Solid Rocket Boosters, four-segment)
- Ariane 5: two (P241/P238)
- LVM3: two (S200)

Some launchers use a variable number of boosters depending on payload and target orbit:

- Atlas V: zero, 1, 2, 3, 4, or 5 (GEM-63)
- Delta II: Often launched with 9 SRBs, but sometimes fewer.
- Delta IV Medium: zero, 2, or 4 Graphite-Epoxy Motors (GEM 60s) strap-on boosters
- PSLV: 2, 4, or 6 (S9/S12) and S139 First Stage
- Ariane 6: two or four P120C or four P160C
- Vulcan Centaur: zero, 2, 4, or 6 (GEM 63XL)

== See also ==
- Liquid rocket booster – Same as a solid rocket booster, but uses liquid instead of solid fuel
- Solid-fuel rocket
- Graphite-epoxy motor – American solid rocket booster
- Comparison of orbital rocket engines
- Space Shuttle Solid Rocket Booster
