= Koreasat 1 =

South Korean satellite launched in 2017

- Mission type: Communications
- Operator: KT Corporation
- COSPAR ID: 1995-041A
- SATCAT no.: 23639
- Mission duration: 10 years

Spacecraft properties
- Bus: AS-3000
- Manufacturer: Martin Marietta / Lockheed Martin
- Launch mass: 1,464 kilograms (3,228 lb)
- Dry mass: 711 kilograms (1,567 lb)

Start of mission
- Launch date: August 5, 1995, 11:10 UTC
- Rocket: Delta II 7925
- Launch site: Cape Canaveral LC-17B

End of mission
- Disposal: Decommissioned
- Deactivated: December 16, 2005

Orbital parameters
- Reference system: Geocentric
- Regime: Geostationary
- Longitude: 116° E
- Perigee altitude: 35,776 kilometers (22,230 mi)
- Apogee altitude: 35,796 kilometers (22,243 mi)
- Inclination: 2.7°
- Period: 1,436.1 minutes
- Epoch: August 5, 1995

Transponders
- Band: 12 FSS Ku band, 3 BSS Ku band
- Bandwidth: 36 MHz, 27 MHz
- Coverage area: South Korea, Asia,

Koreasat 1 was a South Korean communications satellite launched by a Delta II rocket from Cape Canaveral Air Force Station, Florida, United States. Owned by KT Corporation.

== History ==
One of the boosters of the Delta II rocket failed to separate from the first stage of the spacecraft, placing it 5,000 km short of its planned GTO apogee. The satellite had to use up 7.5 years worth of its 12-year lifetime fuel supply to make up the deficiency, shortening Koreasat 1's expected life to about 4.5 years. In order to extend its lifetime, it gave up north–south station-keeping operating in "inclined mode." In the end, the satellite managed to function for 10 years.

The satellite was equipped with a Star 30 solid apogee motor. It carried 625 kg (1,378 lb) of fuel for the apogee motor and 187 kg (412 lb) of hydrazine propellant.

It was eventually positioned in geosynchronous orbit at 116° E operated it at 47.5° E where it was focused on Hungary. The satellite went out of service on December 16, 2005, and was moved to the graveyard orbit. As of March 9, 2007, it was located at 152.88° E drifting at 2.155° W per day.

== See also ==
- Asia Broadcast Satellite
