= Feras =

Firas
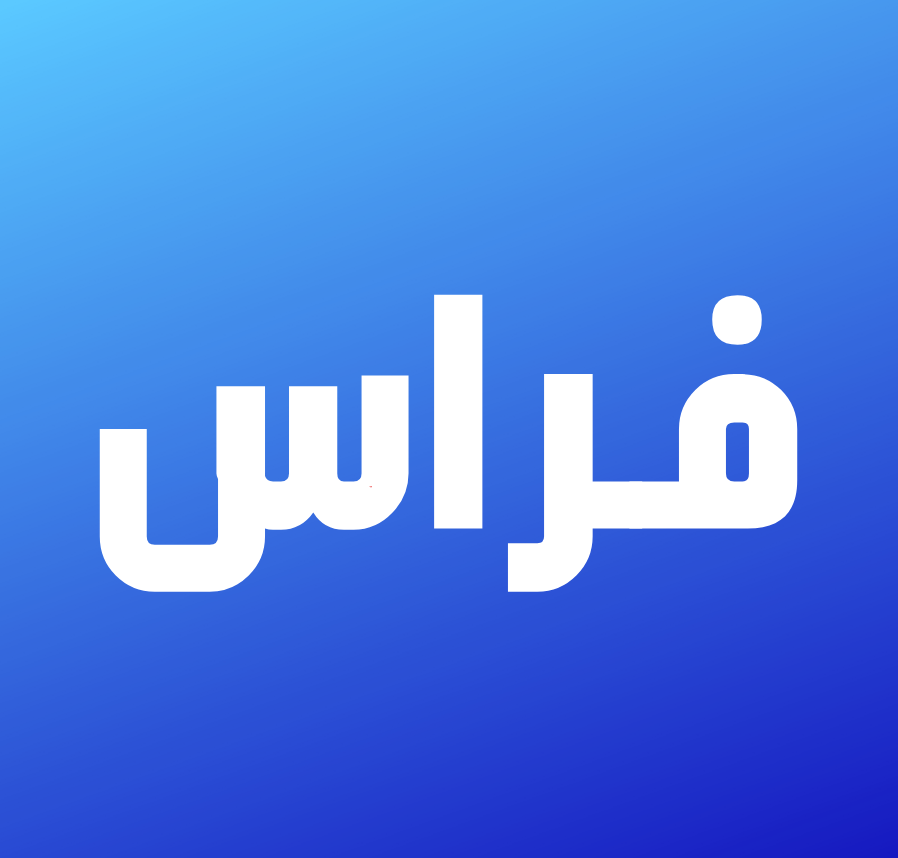
- Gender: Male

Origin
- Origin: Arabic

Other names
- Alternative spelling: Firas, Feras, Ferris
- Related names: Faris

Feras, Firas, or Firass (Arabic: فراس) is a masculine given name and surname of Arabic origin.

== Given name ==
Notable people with the name include:

=== Feras ===
- Feras Antoon (born 1975), Syrian-born Canadian businessman
- Feras Esmaeel (1983–2026), Syrian football player
- Feras Fayyad (born 1984), Syrian film director
- Feras Hatoum, Lebanese journalist
- Feras Kilani (born 1976), Palestinian-British journalist
- Feras Milhem, Palestinian lawyer and politician
- Feras Saied (1981–2015), Syrian bodybuilder
- Feras Shelbaieh (born 1993), Jordanian football player
- Feras Taleb (born 1977), Jordanian football player

=== Firas ===
- Firas Abu Akel (born 1997), Arab-Israeli footballer
- Firas Al Ali (born 1985), Syrian footballer
- Firas al-Buraikan (born 2000), Saudi Arabian footballer
- Firas Chaieb (born 1992), Qatari handball player
- Firas Chaouat (born 1996), Tunisian footballer
- Firas Abou Fakher (born 1988), Lebanese composer, musician, producer, and writer
- Firas Al-Ghamdi (born 1999), Saudi Arabian footballer
- Firas Al-Hawari, Jordanian politician
- Firas Kashosh (born 1976), Syrian footballer
- Firas Katoussi (born 1995), Tunisian taekwondo practitioner
- Firas Al-Khatib (born 1983), Syrian footballer
- Firas Khoury (born 1982), Palestinian film director and screenwriter
- Firas Lahyani (born 1991), Tunisian basketball player
- Firas Ben Larbi (born 1996), Tunisian footballer
- Firas Al-Mahamid (born 1977), Syrian athlete
- Firas Mugrabi (born 1991), Arab-Israeli footballer
- Firas al-Sawwah (born 1941), Syrian writer
- Firas Suleiman, Syrian poet and writer
- Firas Tlass (born 1960), Syrian businessman
- Firas Zahabi (born 1980), Canadian martial artist

=== Firass ===
- Firass Abiad (born 1970), Lebanese politician and medical doctor
- Firass Dirani (born 1984), Australian actor

== Surname ==
=== Firas ===
- Princess Dana Firas (born 1970), Jordanian princess

== See also ==
- Firas (disambiguation)
