= Space Shuttle engine =

Space Shuttle engine may refer to:

- AJ10, engine mounted on the Space Shuttle Orbital Maneuvering System
- RS-25, engine mounted on the Space Shuttle orbiter
