= Firas =

Firas (also Feras) may refer to:

- Firas or Feras, as Arabic given name.
- FIRAS (Far-InfraRed Absolute Spectrophotometer), an astronomical instrument aboard Cosmic Background Explorer

== See also ==
- Feras, a given name
