= European Service Module =

Primary power and propulsion component of the Orion spacecraft

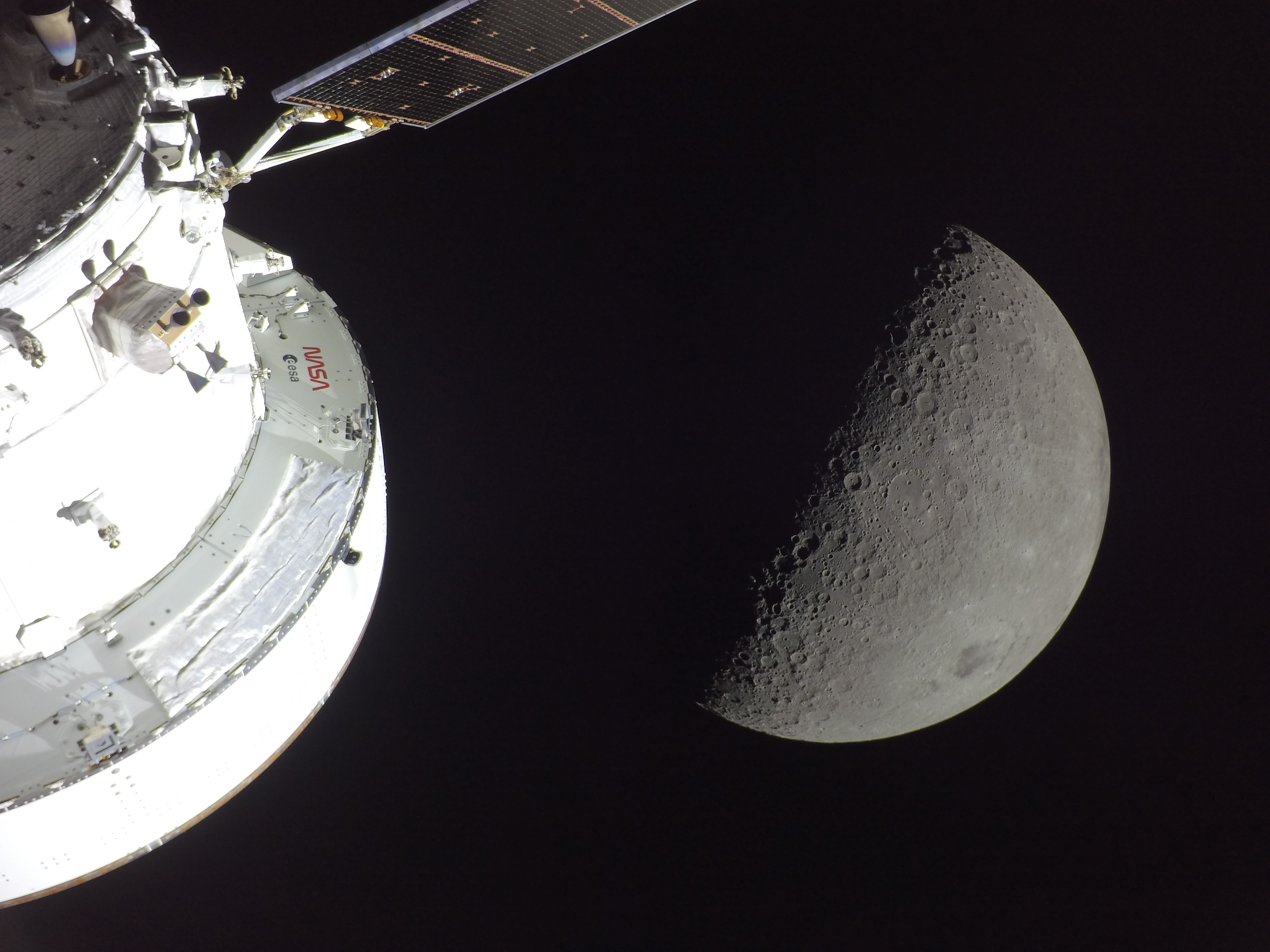
- The ESM is visible at left as Orion approaches the Moon on the 2026 Artemis II mission
- Manufacturer: Airbus Defence and Space
- Designer: ESA
- Operator: NASA

Specifications
- Launch mass: 34,085 lb (15,461 kg)
- Dry mass: 13,635 lb (6,185 kg)
- Power: 11 kW

Dimensions
- Height: 4 m (13 ft)
- Diameter: 4.1 m (13 ft 5 in) excluding solar panels; 5.2 m (17 ft 1 in) with solar panels stowed; 19 m (62 ft 4 in) with solar panels deployed

Production
- Status: Operational
- On order: 2
- Built: 6
- Launched: 2
- Retired: 2
- Maiden launch: November 16, 2022 (Artemis I)
- Last launch: April 1, 2026 (Artemis II, most recent)

Related spacecraft
- Derived from: Automated Transfer Vehicle
- Flown with: Orion

Propulsion
- Propellant mass: 8,600 kg (19,000 lb)
- Powered by: 1 × AJ10; 8 × R-4D
- Maximum thrust: AJ10: 26.6 kN (6,000 lb_{f}); R-4D: 3.92 kN (880 lb_{f})
- Propellant: MON-3/MMH

The European Service Module (ESM) is the service module component of the Orion spacecraft, serving as its primary power and propulsion component until it is discarded at the end of each mission. In January 2013, the National Aeronautics and Space Administration (NASA) announced that the European Space Agency (ESA) will contribute the service module for Artemis I, based on ESA's Automated Transfer Vehicle (ATV). It was delivered by Airbus Defence and Space from Bremen, Germany, to NASA at the end of 2018. After approval of the first module, ESA provided the ESM for Artemis II with current plans to continue the provision up to Artemis VI.

The module's first flight was Artemis I, the first major milestone in NASA's Artemis program to return humans to the Moon, on November 16, 2022. The Space Launch System launched Orion toward the Moon, where the ESM placed the spacecraft into distant retrograde orbit around the Moon, and subsequently extracted it from that orbit and sent it back to Earth.

The service module (SM) supports the crew module (CM) from launch through to separation prior to reentry. It provides in-space propulsion capability for orbital transfer, attitude control, and high altitude ascent aborts. It provides the water and oxygen needed for a habitable environment, generates and stores electrical power, and maintains the temperature of the vehicle's systems and components. This module can also transport unpressurized cargo and scientific payloads.

Unlike the Apollo command and service module, the ESM does not have the delta-v necessary to return to Earth from low lunar orbit. This limitation motivates the larger size of Artemis's Human Landing Systems, and previously the Lunar Gateway.

== History ==
=== Initial design ===
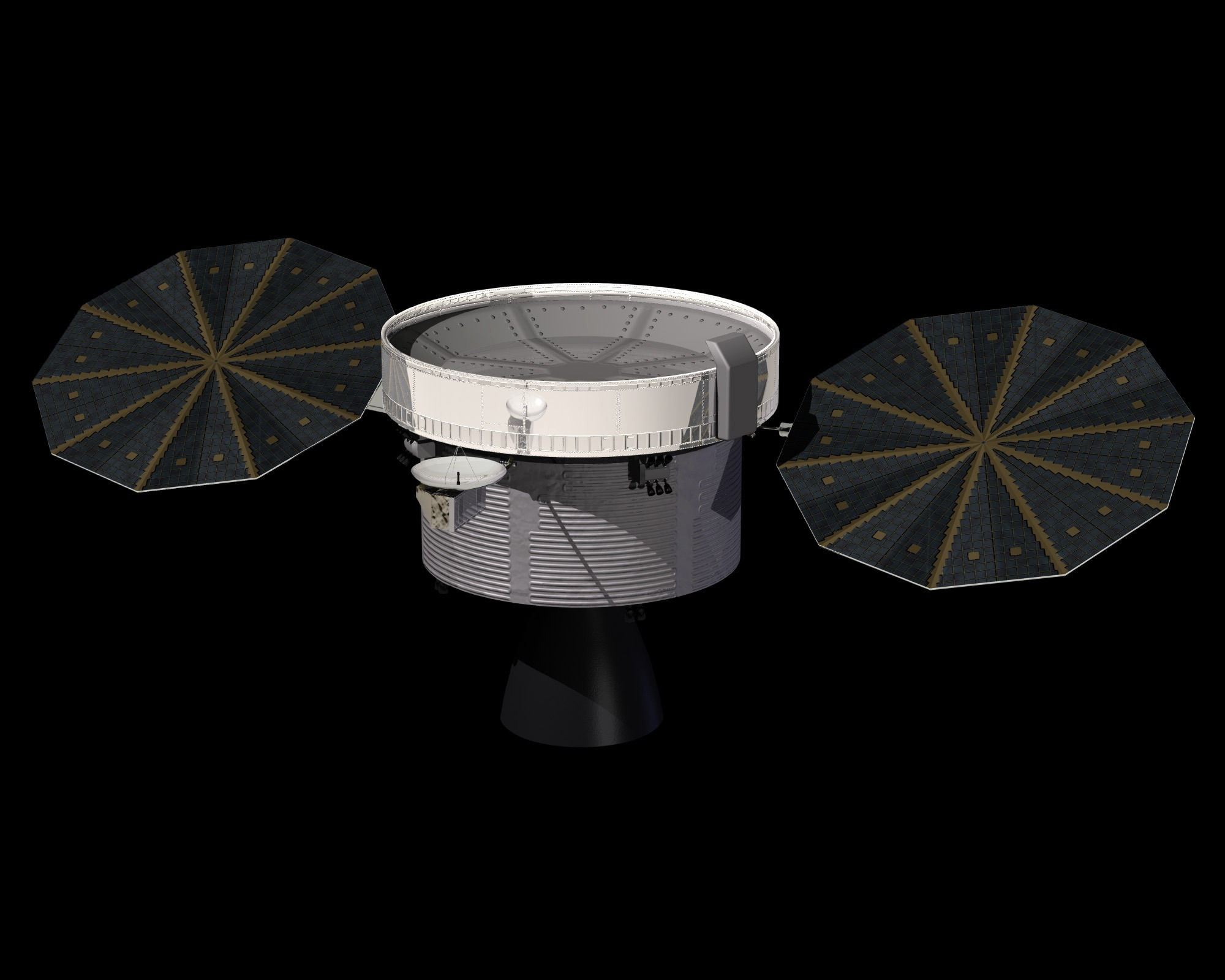
Pre-ATV service module design

Roughly cylindrical in shape, the original American-designed Orion SM, like the CM, would have been constructed of aluminium–lithium alloy (to keep weight down), and would have featured a pair of deployable decagonal solar panels, similar in design to the panels used on the Mars Phoenix lander. The panels, the first to be used on a U.S. crewed spacecraft (except for a 10-year period, the Soviet/Russian Soyuz spacecraft has used them since the first mission in 1967), would allow NASA to eliminate the need to carry malfunction-prone fuel cells, and their associated hardware (mainly liquid hydrogen tanks) in the SM, resulting in a shorter and more maneuverable spacecraft. Successful initial testing of an Orion solar array design using full-scale "UltraFlex wing" hardware was reported in October 2008.

The Orion Main Engine (OME) was a 33-kilonewton-thrust (7,500 lbf), pressure-fed, regeneratively cooled, storable bi-propellant rocket engine to be made by Aerojet. The OME was an increased performance version of the 27-kilonewton-thrust (6,000 lbf) rocket engine used by the Space Shuttle for its Orbital Maneuvering System. The SM Reaction Control System (RCS), the spacecraft's maneuvering thrusters (originally based on the Apollo "quad" system, but resembling that used on its predecessor, Gemini), would also be pressure-fed, and would use the same propellants. NASA believed the SM RCS would be able to act as a backup for a trans-Earth injection burn in case the main SM engine failed.

A pair of liquid oxygen tanks (similar to those used in the Apollo service module) would provide, along with small tanks of nitrogen, the crew with breathing air at sea-level or "cruising altitude" pressure (1 or 0.7 atm), with a small "surge tank" providing necessary life support during reentry and touchdown. Lithium hydroxide (LiOH) cartridges would recycle the spacecraft's environmental system by "scrubbing" the carbon dioxide (CO_{2}) exhaled by the astronauts from ship's air and adding fresh oxygen and nitrogen, which was then cycled back out into the system loop. Because of the switch from fuel cells to solar panels, the service module would have an onboard water tank to provide drinking water for the crew, and (when mixed with glycol), cooling water for the spacecraft's electronics. Unlike the practice during Apollo of dumping both water and urine overboard during the flight, the Orion would have an onboard recycling system, identical to that used on the International Space Station, to convert both waste water and urine into both drinking and cooling water.

The service module also mounted the spacecraft's waste heat management system (its radiators) and the aforementioned solar panels. These panels, along with backup batteries located in the Orion CM, would provide in-flight power to the ship's systems. The voltage, 28 volts DC, was similar to that used on the Apollo spacecraft during flight.

The Orion SM would be encapsulated by fiberglass shrouds jettisoned at the same time as the LES/Boost Protective Cover, which would take place roughly 2 1/2 minutes after launch (30 seconds after the solid rocket first stage was jettisoned). Prior to the "Orion 606" redesign, the Orion SM resembled a squat, enlarged version of the Apollo service module. The "Orion 606" SM design retained the 5-meter (16 ft) width for the attachments of the Orion SM with the Orion CM, but used a Soyuz-like service module design to allow Lockheed Martin to make the vehicle lighter in weight and permitting the attachment of the decagonal solar panels at the module's midpoints, instead of at the base near the spacecraft/rocket adapter, which might have subjected the panels to damage.

The Orion service module (SM) was projected comprising a cylindrical shape, having a diameter of 5 m (16 ft) and an overall length (including thruster) of 4.78 m (15 ft 8 in). The projected empty mass was 3,600 kg (8,000 lb), fuel capacity was 8,200 kg (18,000 lb).

=== Cost reviews and scope changes ===
A review of the Constellation program in 2009 by the new Augustine Commission prompted by the then new Obama administration had found that five years in, the service module development program was already running four years behind its 2020 lunar target and was woefully underfunded. The only element worth continuing was the Crew Exploration Vehicle in the role of a space station escape capsule. This led in 2010 to the Administration cancelling the program by withdrawing funding in the proposed 2011 budget. A public outcry led to the program being frozen rather than outright cancelled and a review launched in to how costs could be cut, which found that it was possible to continue if there was an emphasis on finding alternate funding, reducing the complexity by narrowing the scope to focus on the Moon and deep space rather than Mars, and by reusing existing hardware, reducing the range of equipment requiring development. The Ares I launcher intended for crew flights had significant design issues such as being overweight and prone to dangerous vibration, and in the case of a catastrophic failure its blast radius exceeded the escape system's ejection range. Its role as the Orion launch vehicle was replaced by the Space Launch System, and the three different Crew Exploration Vehicle designs were merged in to a single Multipurpose Crew Exploration Vehicle.

=== European ATV-based module ===
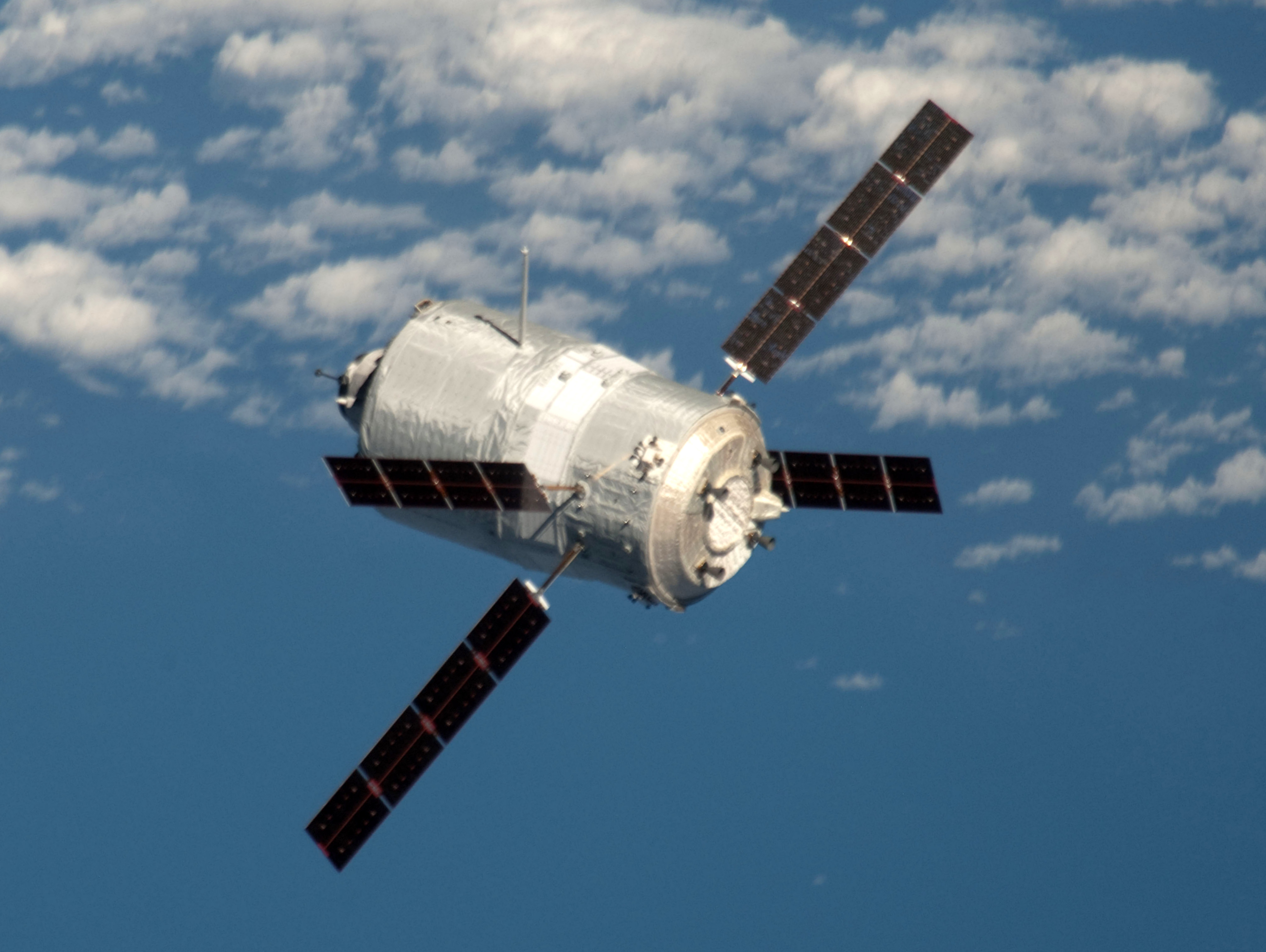
Edoardo Amaldi ATV approaching the International Space Station in 2012

In May 2011, ESA's director general announced a possible collaboration with NASA to work on a successor to ESA's Automated Transfer Vehicle (ATV). ESA's provision of this successor could be counted towards its 8% share of the operating costs of the International Space Station (ISS); the ATV missions resupplying the station only covered this obligation up to 2017. On 21 June 2012, Astrium announced that it had been awarded two separate studies to evaluate possible future missions building on the technology and experience gained from its development of ATV and the Columbus laboratory. The first study looked into the construction of a service module which would be used in tandem with the Orion capsule. The second examined the production of a versatile multi-purpose orbital vehicle. Each study was worth €6.5 million.

In November 2012, ESA obtained the commitment of its member states for it to construct an ATV-derived service module for Orion, to fly on the maiden flight of the Space Launch System, thereby meeting ESA's budgetary obligation to NASA regarding the ISS for 2017–2020. No decision was made about supplying the module for later Orion flights.

In January 2013, NASA announced its agreement, made the preceding December, that ESA would build the service module for Exploration Mission-1 (renamed Artemis I), then scheduled to take place in 2017. This service module was not required for Exploration Flight Test-1 in 2014, as this used a test service module supplied by Lockheed Martin. On 17 November 2014 ESA signed a €390 million fixed price contract with Airbus Defence and Space for the development and construction of the first ATV-based service module. In December 2016, ESA's member states agreed it would extend its commitment to the ISS to 2024, and would supply a second service module, as part of the resulting budgetary obligation.

=== Design ===
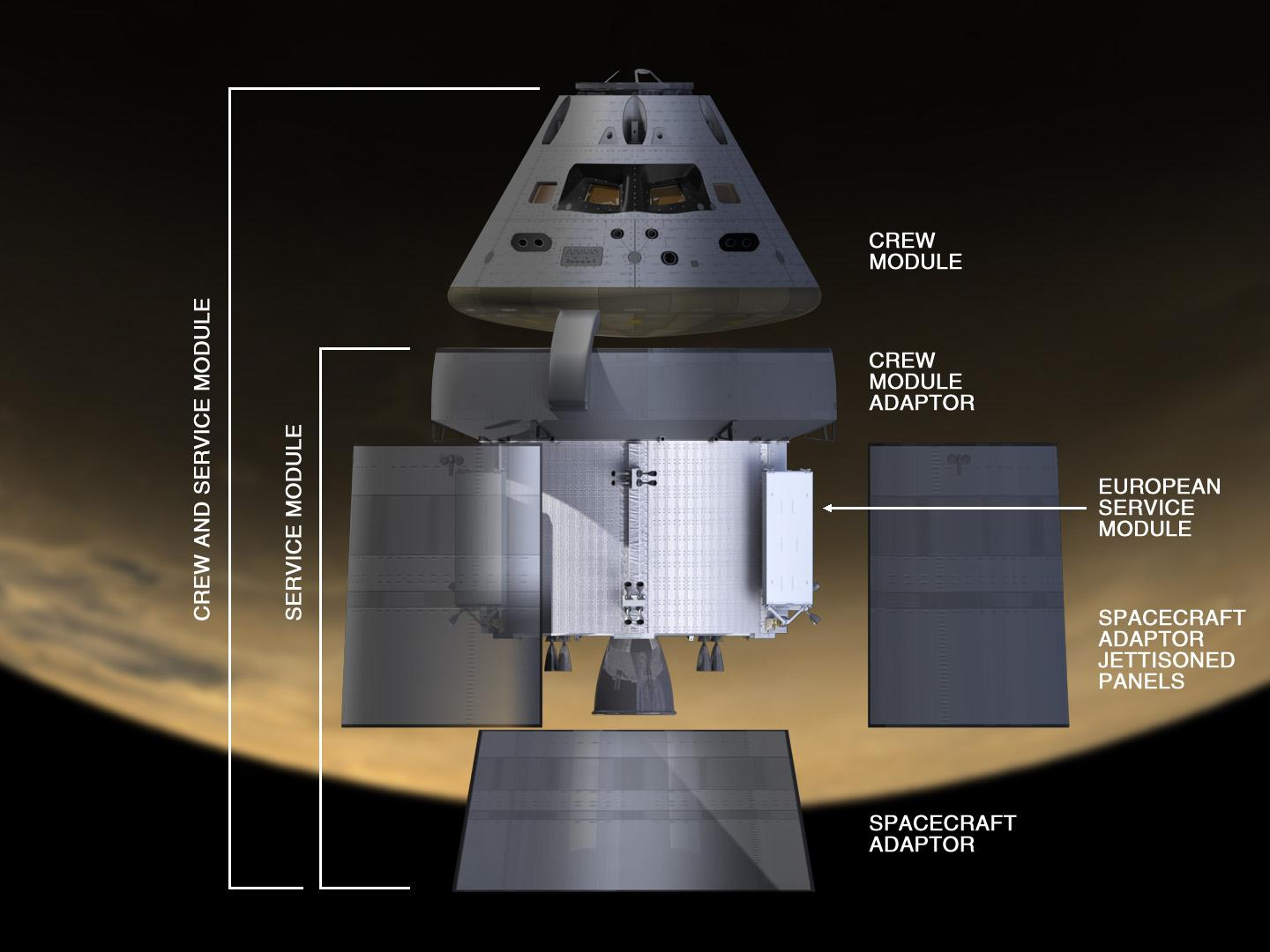
Service module shown with the crew module, adapters, and fairing panels

The service module is approximately 5.0 metres (16.5 ft) in diameter and 4.0 metres (13 ft) in length, and made of aluminium-lithium alloy.

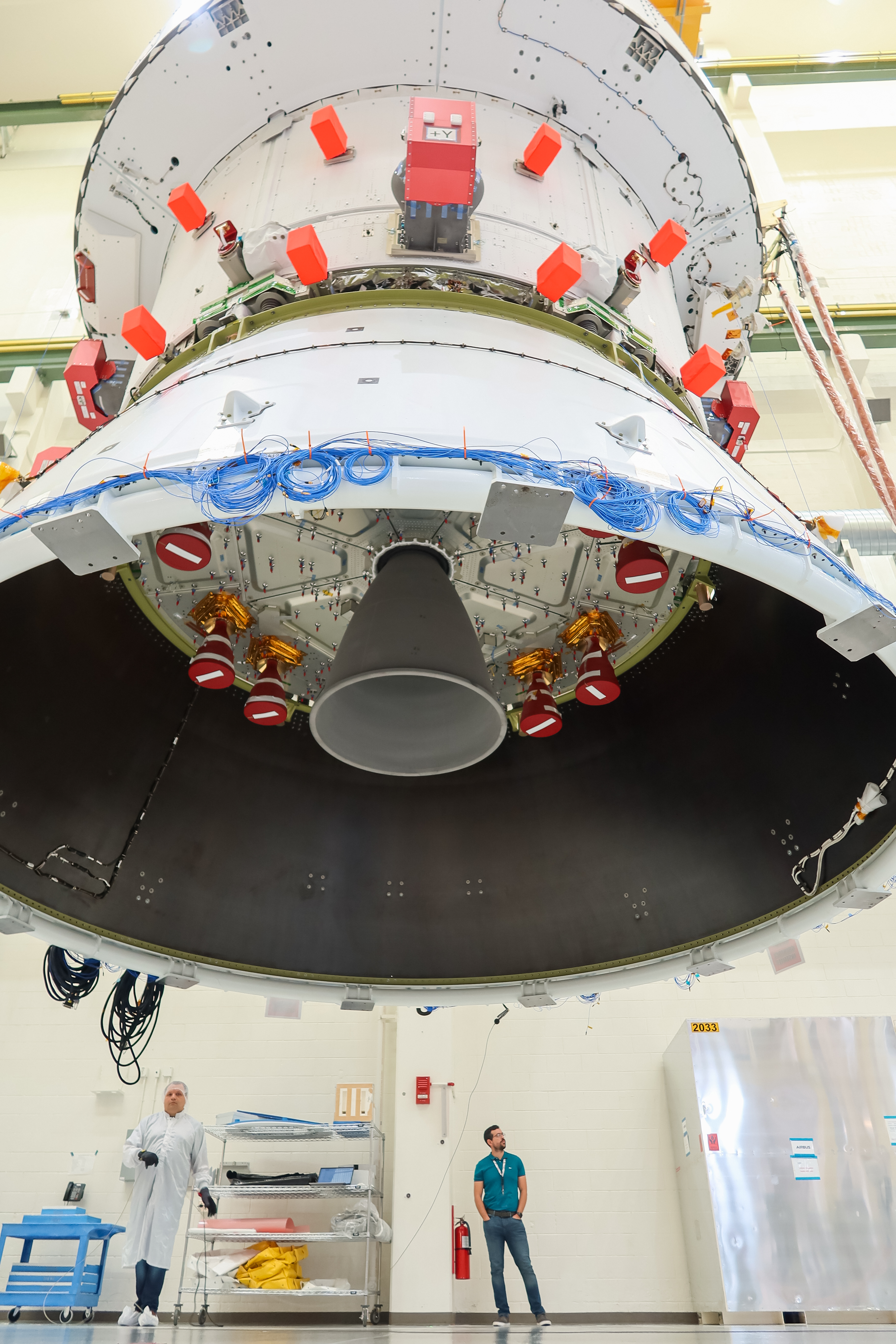
Looking up from beneath the ESM for the Artemis II mission showing its single AJ10 main engine and eight R-4D secondary engines

For the first six service modules, the main engine will be a NASA-provided refurbished AJ10-190 previously used with the Space Shuttle Orbital Maneuvering System. For example, the engine used on Artemis I had previously flown on 19 Space Shuttle missions, performing a total of 89 burns. The engine provides 26.6 kilonewtons (6,000 lb_{f}) of thrust. The AJ10 design itself has a long heritage, dating back to 1957 when it was developed for the Vanguard rocket, one of America's earliest launch vehicles. A variant of the AJ10 was also used on the Apollo service module. For future missions, Aerojet Rocketdyne will deliver up to 20 new Orion Main Engines (OME), based on the AJ10 design.

In comparison with the Apollo command and service module, which previously took astronauts to the Moon, the European Service Module (ESM) generates approximately twice as much electricity (11.2 kW vs 6.3 kW), weighs nearly 40% less when fully fueled (15,461 kg, vs 24,520 kg) and is roughly the same size (4 m in length excluding engine and 4.1 m vs 3.9 m in diameter) supporting the environment for a slightly (45%) larger habitable volume on the crew module (8.95 m^{3} vs 6.17 m^{3}) though it will carry 50% less propellant for orbital maneuvers (8,600 kg usable propellant vs 18,584 kg).

The ESM will be able to support a crew of four for 21 days which exceeds the 14 day endurance for the three-man Apollo.

The new design for the solar arrays, replacing ATK's decagonal (labeled "circular") UltraFlex design, is by Airbus Defence and Space, whose subsidiary, Airbus Netherlands (then known as Dutch Space), built the ATV's X-shaped array of four panels. The ATV's array was expected to generate 4.6 kilowatts. The upgraded version for the service module will generate about 11 kilowatts, and will span about 19 m (62 ft) when extended.

In September 2015, Thales Alenia Space signed a contract with Airbus Defence and Space to develop and produce thermomechanical systems for the service module, including structure and micrometeoroid protection, thermal control and consumable storage and distribution.

Lockheed Martin is building the two adapters, connecting the service module to the crew module and to the upper stage of the Space Launch System, and also the three fairing panels that are jettisoned after protecting the service module during launch and ascent.

==== From 2017 ====
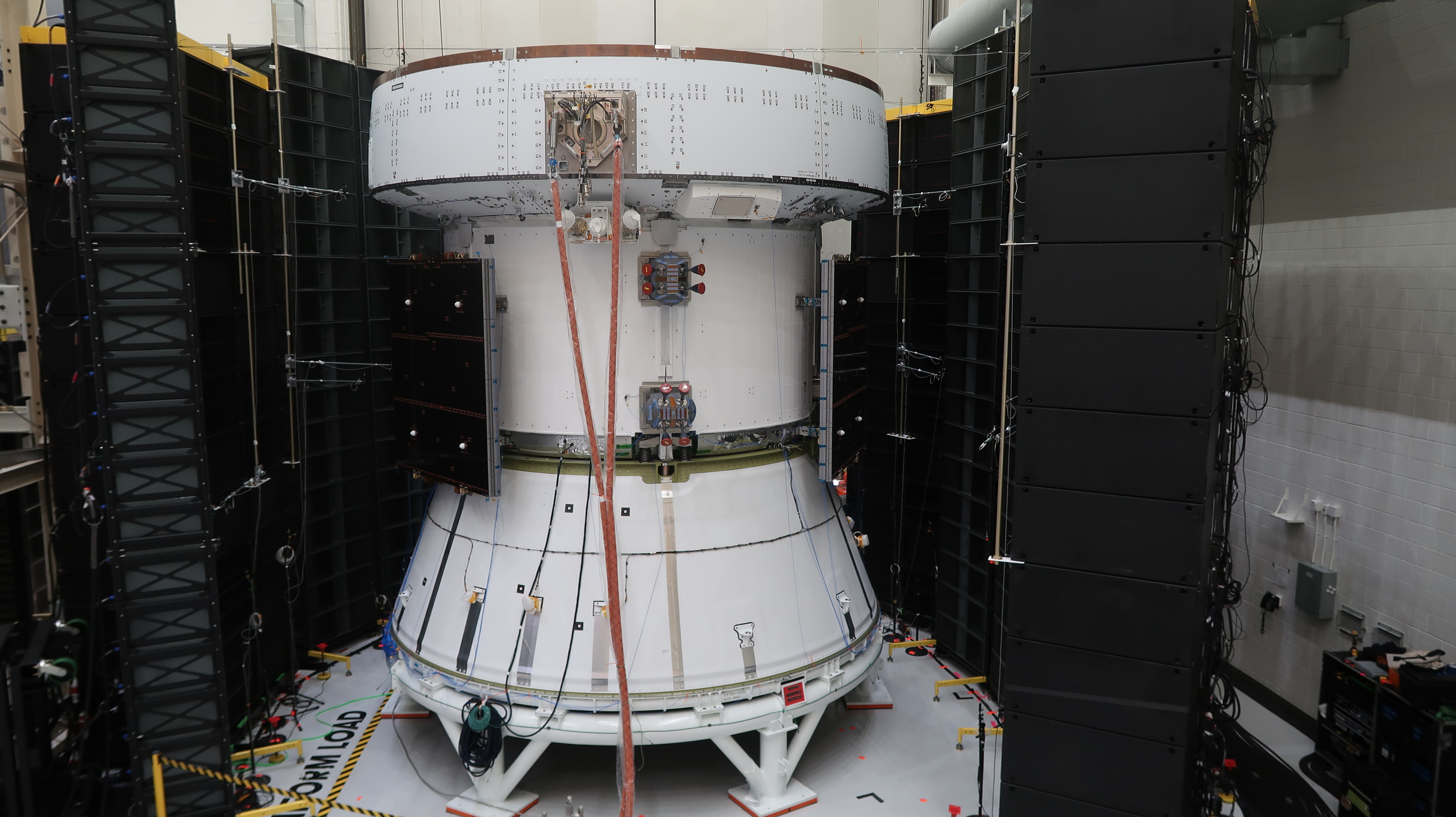
The ESM for the Artemis II mission inside the O&C building after testing in 2023

On 16 February 2017 a €200m contract was signed between Airbus and the European Space Agency for the production of a second European service module for use on the first crewed Orion flight.

On 26 October 2018 the first unit for Artemis I was assembled in full at Airbus Defence and Space's factory in Bremen.

In November 2019, ESA member states approved the financing of ESMs for Artemis III and IV. In May 2020 the contract between Airbus and the European Space Agency for the production of a third European Service Module was signed.

In October 2020, ESA and NASA sign a memorandum of understanding which includes the provision by ESA of ESM-4 and ESM-5 as a participation in the Gateway space station, allowing three flights of European astronauts to Lunar orbit between 2025 and 2030.

In February 2021, the contract between Airbus and the European Space Agency to provide ESM-4 to ESM-6 was signed.

=== Artemis II ===
The 2026 Artemis II mission saw the first crewed flight of the Orion spacecraft and the ESM. After they separated from the upper stage, the crew conducted a proximity operations demonstration with the ESM and using the Interim Cryogenic Propulsion Stage (ICPS) as a target. Over approximately 70 minutes, astronaut Victor Glover manually controlled the spacecraft, performing a series of maneuvers to evaluate handling qualities and practice techniques for future docking operations. The ICPS was equipped with a docking target, enabling tests of the ESM's ability to maneuver relative to another spacecraft using onboard navigation sensors and reaction control thrusters.

On flight day 2, following completion of high Earth orbit operations and system checks, Orion performed a 5-minute, 49-second trans-lunar injection (TLI) burn using the ESM's AJ10 main engine. This was the only use of the main engine during the mission; subsequent maneuvers were carried out by the eight smaller R-4D secondary engines. The burn consumed approximately 1,000 pounds (450 kg) of propellant and placed the spacecraft on a free-return trajectory around the Moon, requiring only minor course corrections for the remainder of the mission.

On flight day 4, astronauts Christina Koch and Jeremy Hansen took turns manually controlling the spacecraft during a 41-minute evaluation of its handling in deep space, testing both six-degree-of-freedom and three-degree-of-freedom thruster control modes.

A similar manual control test planned for flight day 8 was canceled so controllers could conduct additional testing of the propulsion system. The change allowed engineers to gather data on a small helium leak in the ESM and better characterize its behavior in flight.

The leak was in the ESM's helium pressurization system, which is used to feed propellants to the spacecraft's engines and thrusters. According to NASA, the leak occurred across valves in the oxidizer-side pressurization circuit and did not result in a loss of propellant to space. The issue did not affect propulsion performance, and all major burns were completed nominally. Due to the relatively low propulsion demands of the mission's free-return trajectory, the spacecraft retained significant propellant margins, and NASA determined the leak posed no risk to mission success or crew safety.

To support in-flight diagnostics, mission controllers modified the flight plan to prioritize propulsion system testing, including thermal and attitude variations to better characterize the leak under different conditions. Because the ESM is jettisoned prior to reentry and destroyed in Earth's atmosphere, these tests provided the only opportunity to collect detailed data on the affected hardware.

Post-flight assessments indicated that the leak rate observed in flight was higher than expected. NASA officials stated that the issue will likely require design modifications to the ESM's valve system for future missions. The data collected during Artemis II is expected to inform these updates, particularly for missions requiring more complex propulsion operations, such as sustained lunar orbit activities.

== Specifications ==
Length	4 m (13 ft 1 in)
Diameter	4.1 m (13 ft 5 in) excluding solar panels 5.2 m (17 ft 1 in) with solar panels stowed 19 m (62 ft 4 in) with solar panels deployed
Primary engine	1 × Aerojet AJ10 providing 26.6 kN (6,000 lb_{f}) of thrust (ESM-1 to ESM-6) 1 × Aerojet Orion Main Engine (from ESM-7 on)
Secondary engines	8 × Aerojet R-4D providing 490 N (110 lb_{f}) of thrust each, 3.92 kN (880 lb_{f}) total
Maneuvering thrusters	24 × Airbus Reaction Control System engines in six pods of four providing 220 N (49 lb_{f}) of thrust each, 5.28 kN (1,190 lb_{f}) total
Propellant capacity	9,000 kg (20,000 lb) of propellant in 4 × 2,000 L (440 imp gal; 530 US gal) tanks (2 × MON and 2 × MMH). Usable load is 8,600 kg (19,000 lb).
Power generation	11.2 kW from 4 × 7.375 m (24.20 ft) wings each containing 3 solar panels
Total launch mass	13,500 kg (29,800 lb) for Lunar Mission, including 240 kg (530 lb) of water in four tanks, 90 kg (200 lb) of oxygen in three tanks, 30 kg (66 lb) of nitrogen in one tank
Payload	Payload mass up to 380 kg (840 lb) and a payload volume of up to 0.57 m^{3} (20 cu ft)
Materials	Aluminum alloy (structure), stainless steel, titanium (tanks), Kapton (insulation) and copper (electrical and mechanical components)

== European Service Module models ==
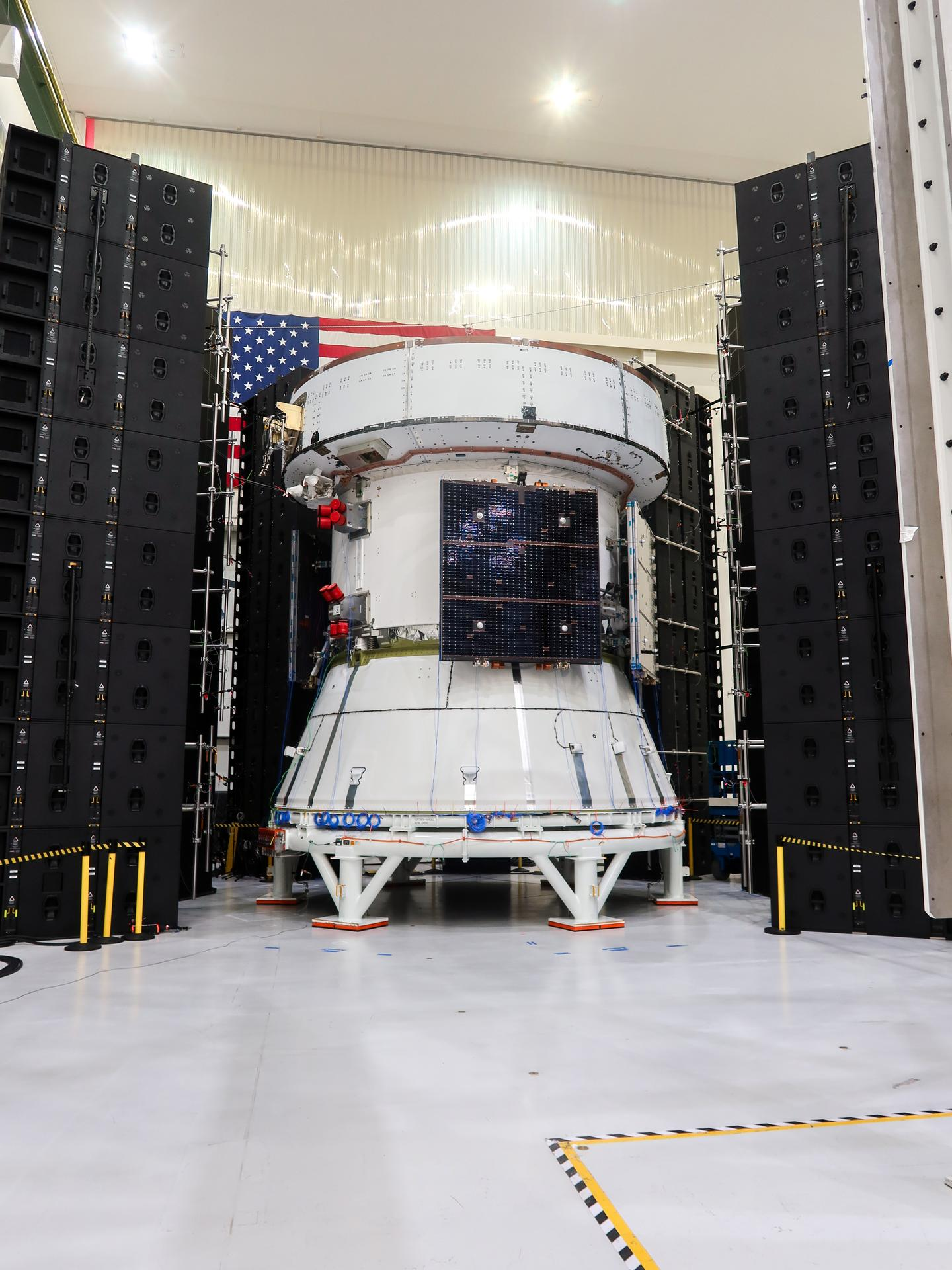
The ESM being tested for Artemis III, as seen inside O&C in May 2026.

Model	Mission	Status
STA	Structural Test Article	Used for structural testing at NASA Glenn Research Center
PQM	Propulsion Qualification Model	Used for propulsion testing at NASA White Sands Test Facility
ESM‑1	Artemis I	Mission complete, launched 16 November 2022
ESM‑2	Artemis II	Mission complete, launched 2 April 2026
ESM‑3	Artemis III	Delivered to NASA, in Operations and Checkout Building
ESM‑4	Artemis IV	Delivered to NASA, in Operations and Checkout Building
ESM‑5	Artemis V	Undergoing integration in Bremen, delivery planned for 2028.
ESM‑6	Artemis VI	Undergoing integration in Bremen, delivery planned for 2029.
ESM‑7 to 8	Artemis VII - VIII	In negotiations between ESA and NASA.
