= Hatoum =

Hatoum is a surname. Notable people with the surname include:

- Ed Hatoum (born 1947), Canadian ice hockey player
- Feras Hatoum, Lebanese journalist
- Milton Hatoum (born 1952), Brazilian writer, translator, and academic
- Mona Hatoum (born 1952), British-Palestinian artist
