= Delta-K =

American rocket stage

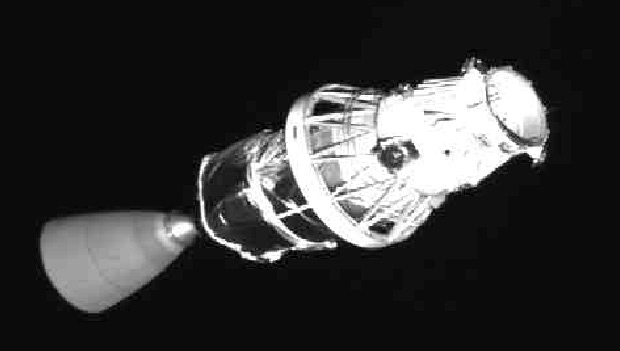
- Spent Delta-K stage, photographed in orbit
- Manufacturer: United Launch Alliance (formerly Boeing and McDonnell Douglas)
- Country of origin: United States
- Used on: Delta 4000; Delta 5000; Delta II

General characteristics
- Height: 5.9 meters (19 ft)
- Diameter: 2.4 meters (7.9 ft)
- Gross mass: 6,954 kilograms (15,331 lb)
- Propellant mass: 6,004 kilograms (13,237 lb)

Engine details
- Powered by: 1 AJ10-118K
- Maximum thrust: 43.63 kilonewtons (9,810 lbf)
- Specific impulse: 319 seconds (3.13 km/s)
- Burn time: 431 seconds
- Propellant: Aerozine 50 / N_{2}O_{4}

The Delta-K was an American rocket stage, developed by McDonnell Douglas and Aerojet. It was first used on 27 August 1989 as the second stage for the Delta 4000 series.

It continued to serve as the second stage for subsequent variants of the Delta rocket.

It was propelled by a single AJ10-118K rocket engine, fueled by Aerozine 50 and dinitrogen tetroxide, which are hypergolic.

The Delta-K had a long heritage to the first Able stage used in Project Vanguard. The AJ-10 engine was first used in the Able second stage of the Vanguard rocket, as the AJ10-118 configuration. It was initially fueled by nitric acid and UDMH. An AJ10 engine was first fired in flight during the third Vanguard launch, on 17 March 1958, which successfully placed the Vanguard 1 satellite into orbit.

As of 25 May 2008, 138 have been launched, and excluding one which was destroyed by the explosion of a lower stage, none have failed.

The Delta-K was used as the second stage of the Delta II rocket from 1989 to 2018. This second stage was retired at conclusion of the ICESat-2 launch on 15 September 2018.

== See also ==
- Delta Cryogenic Second Stage
- Advanced Common Evolved Stage
- Transtage
