= Delta 5000 =

Series of American expendable launch systems

Delta 5000 series
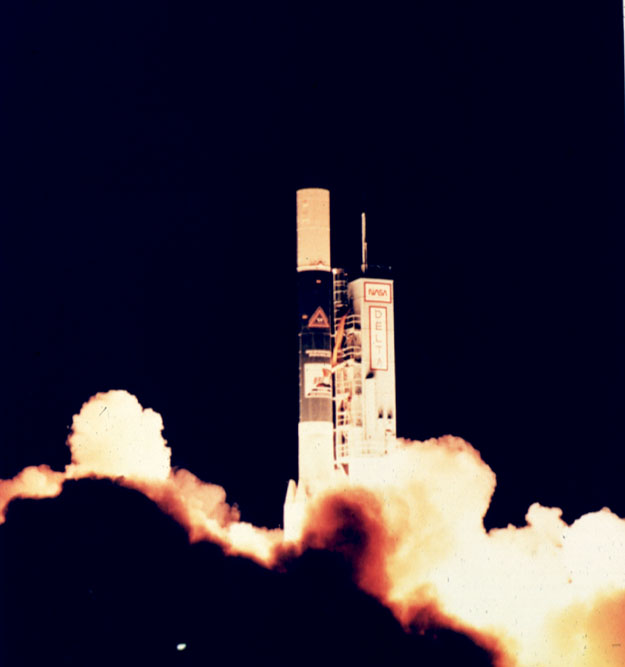
- Launch of the Delta 5920 with COBE
- Function: Expendable launch system
- Country of origin: United States
- Cost per launch: US$34.22 million in 1985 (US$79.99 million in 2018)

Size
- Height: 34 m (112 ft)
- Diameter: 2.44 m (8 ft 0 in)
- Mass: 201,580 kg (444,410 lb)
- Stages: 2

Capacity

Payload to LEO
- Mass: 3,848 kg (8,483 lb)

Payload to GTO
- Mass: 1,405 kg (3,097 lb)

Associated rockets
- Family: Delta
- Comparable: Delta 4000, Delta II

Launch history
- Status: Retired
- Launch sites: Vandenberg SLC-2W
- Total launches: 1
- Success(es): 1
- UTC date of spacecraft launch: 18 November 1989

Boosters – Castor 4A
- No. boosters: 9
- Height: 9.12 m (29.9 ft)
- Diameter: 1.02 m (3 ft 4 in)
- Empty mass: 1,529 kg (3,371 lb)
- Gross mass: 11,743 kg (25,889 lb)
- Powered by: Solid
- Maximum thrust: 478.3 kN (107,500 lb_{f})
- Specific impulse: Sea level: 237 seconds; Vacuum: 266 seconds
- Burn time: 56 s

First stage – Thor/Delta ELT
- Height: 22.37 m (73.4 ft)
- Diameter: 2.44 m (8 ft 0 in)
- Empty mass: 4,360 kg (9,610 lb)
- Gross mass: 84,368 kg (186,000 lb)
- Powered by: 1 RS-27
- Maximum thrust: 1,030.2 kN (231,600 lb_{f})
- Specific impulse: Sea level: 262 seconds; Vacuum: 296 seconds
- Burn time: 223 s
- Propellant: LOX / RP-1

Second stage – Delta K
- Height: 5.89 m (19.3 ft)
- Diameter: 2.44 m (8 ft 0 in)
- Empty mass: 950 kg (2,090 lb)
- Gross mass: 6,954 kg (15,331 lb)
- Powered by: 1 AJ10-118K
- Maximum thrust: 43.6 kN (9,800 lb_{f})
- Specific impulse: 319 s
- Burn time: 431 s
- Propellant: N_{2}O_{4} / Aerozine 50

The Delta 5000 series was an American expendable launch system which was used to conduct an orbital launch in 1989. It was a member of the Delta family of rockets. Although several variants were put forward, only the Delta 5920 was launched. The designation used a four digit numerical code to store information on the configuration of the rocket. It was built from a combination of spare parts left over from earlier Delta rockets, which were being retired, and parts from the Delta II 6000-series, which was just entering service.

The first stage was the RS-27 powered Extended Long Tank Thor, flown on several earlier Delta rockets. Nine Castor-4A solid rocket boosters were attached to increase thrust at lift-off, replacing the less powerful Castor-4 boosters used on the 3000 series. The Delta-K was used as a second stage. In the configuration that was launched, no third stage was flown.

The Delta 5000 was launched just once, from Space Launch Complex 2W at the Vandenberg Air Force Base. Launch occurred at 14:34 on 18 November 1989. It was successful, and placed the Cosmic Background Explorer (COBE) spacecraft into low Earth orbit.

== Payload ==
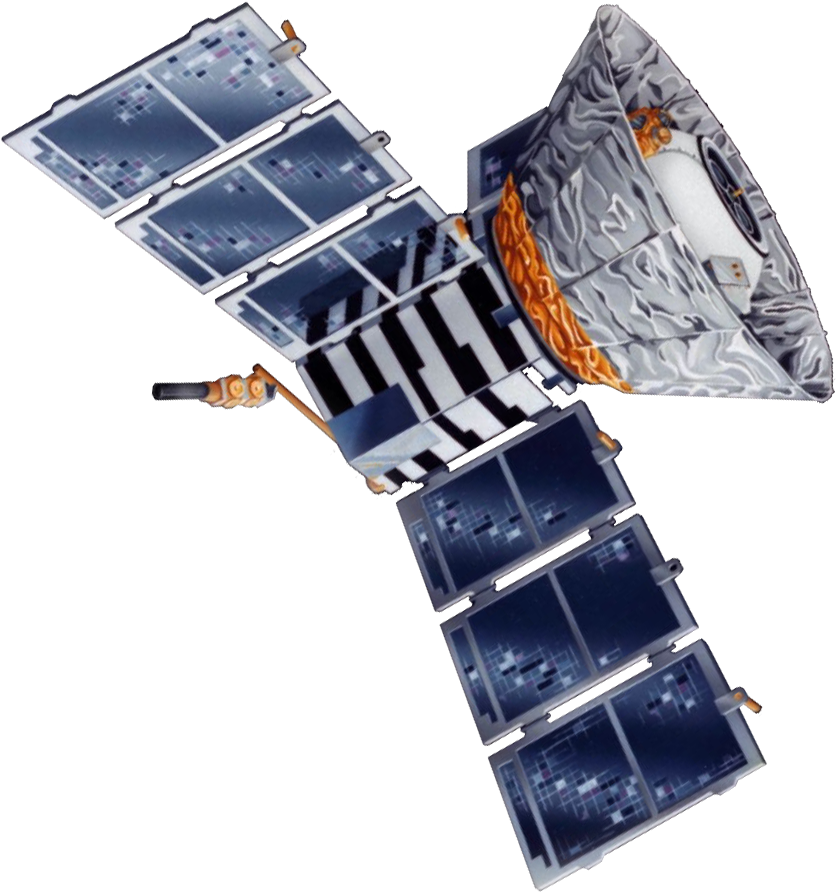
Artist's concept of the COBE spacecraft

The Cosmic Background Explorer (COBE /ˈkoʊbi/ KOH-bee), also referred to as Explorer 66, was a NASA satellite dedicated to cosmology, which operated from 1989 to 1993. Its goals were to investigate the cosmic microwave background radiation (CMB or CMBR) of the universe and provide measurements that would help shape the understanding of the cosmos.

COBE's measurements provided two key pieces of evidence that supported the Big Bang theory of the universe: that the CMB has a near-perfect black-body spectrum, and that it has very faint anisotropies. Two of COBE's principal investigators, George F. Smoot III and John C. Mather, received the Nobel Prize in Physics in 2006 for their work on the project. According to the Nobel Prize committee, "the COBE project can also be regarded as the starting point for cosmology as a precision science".

COBE was the second cosmic microwave background satellite, following RELIKT-1, and was followed by two more advanced spacecraft: the Wilkinson Microwave Anisotropy Probe (WMAP) operated from 2001 to 2010 and the Planck spacecraft from 2009 to 2013.
