= Delta 4000 =

American expendable launch system

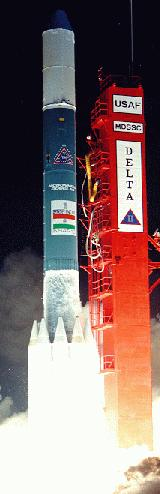
- Launch of a Delta 4925 (Delta 196) with INSAT-1D
- Function: Launch vehicle
- Manufacturer: McDonnell Douglas
- Country of origin: United States
- Cost per launch: US$34.22 million in 1985 (4925 variant) (US$79.99 million in 2018)

Size
- Height: 34 m (112 ft)
- Diameter: 2.44 m (8 ft 0 in)
- Mass: 200,740 kg (442,560 lb)
- Stages: 2 or 3

Capacity

Payload to LEO
- Mass: 3,400 kg (7,500 lb)

Payload to GTO
- Mass: 1,200 kg (2,600 lb)

Associated rockets
- Family: Delta
- Comparable: Delta 5000, Delta II

Launch history
- Status: Retired
- Launch sites: Cape Canaveral SLC-17; Vandenberg AFB SLC-2W
- Total launches: 2
- Success(es): 2
- First flight: 28 August 1989
- Last flight: 12 June 1990

Boosters – Castor 4A
- No. boosters: 9
- Height: 9.12 m (29.9 ft)
- Diameter: 1.02 m (3 ft 4 in)
- Empty mass: 1,529 kg (3,371 lb)
- Gross mass: 11,743 kg (25,889 lb)
- Powered by: Solid
- Maximum thrust: 478.3 kN (107,500 lb_{f})
- Specific impulse: Sea level: 237 seconds; Vacuum: 266 seconds
- Burn time: 56 s

First stage – Thor/Delta ELT
- Height: 22.4 m (73 ft)
- Diameter: 2.44 m (8 ft 0 in)
- Empty mass: 4,059 kg (8,949 lb)
- Gross mass: 84,067 kg (185,336 lb)
- Powered by: 1 MB-3
- Maximum thrust: 760.6 kN (171,000 lb_{f})
- Specific impulse: Sea level: 250 seconds; Vacuum: 285 seconds
- Burn time: 222 s
- Propellant: LOX / RP-1

Second stage – Delta K
- Height: 5.89 m (19.3 ft)
- Diameter: 2.44 m (8 ft 0 in)
- Empty mass: 950 kg (2,090 lb)
- Gross mass: 6,954 kg (15,331 lb)
- Powered by: 1 AJ10-118K
- Maximum thrust: 43.6 kN (9,800 lb_{f})
- Specific impulse: 319 s
- Burn time: 431 s
- Propellant: N_{2}O_{4} /Aerozine 50

Third stage – PAM-D (optional)
- Height: 2.03 m (6 ft 8 in)
- Diameter: 1.25 m (4 ft 1 in)
- Empty mass: 128 kg (282 lb)
- Gross mass: 2,137 kg (4,711 lb)
- Powered by: Star 48B
- Maximum thrust: 66 kN (15,000 lb_{f})
- Specific impulse: 286 s
- Burn time: 87 s

The Delta 4000 series was an American expendable launch system which was used to conduct two orbital launches in 1989 and 1990. It was a member of the Delta family of rockets. Although several variants were put forward, only the Delta 4925 was launched. The designations used a four digit numerical code to store information on the configuration of the rocket. It was built from a combination of spare parts left over from earlier Delta rockets, which were being retired, and parts from the Delta II 6000-series, which was just entering service.

== Configuration ==
The first stage was the MB-3-III powered Extended Long Tank Thor, previously flown on the 1000-series. Nine Castor-4A solid rocket boosters were attached to increase thrust at lift-off, replacing the less powerful Castor-4 boosters used on the 3000 series. The Delta-K was used as a second stage. A Star-48B PAM-D was used as a third stage, to boost payloads into geosynchronous transfer orbit.

== Launches ==
Two Delta 4000 launches occurred from Launch Complex 17B at Cape Canaveral. The first launched Marco Polo 1 for BSkyB, and the second launched INSAT-1D for the Indian Space Research Organisation. Both were successful.

Delta 4000 series launches
S/N	Version	Date	Location	Payload
Delta 187	Delta 4925	27.08.1989	LC-17B	Marco Polo 1
Delta 196	Delta 4925	12.06.1990	LC-17B	INSAT-1D
