= Diffuse Infrared Background Experiment =

DIRBE instrument lightpath

Diffuse Infrared Background Experiment (DIRBE) was an experiment on NASA's COBE mission, to survey the diffuse infrared sky. Measurements were made with a reflecting telescope with 19 cm diameter aperture. The goal was to obtain brightness maps of the universe at ten frequency bands ranging from the near to far infrared (1.25 to 240 micrometer). Also, linear polarization was measured at 1.25, 2.2, and 3.5 micrometers. During the mission, the instrument could sample half the celestial sphere each day.

== Mission details ==
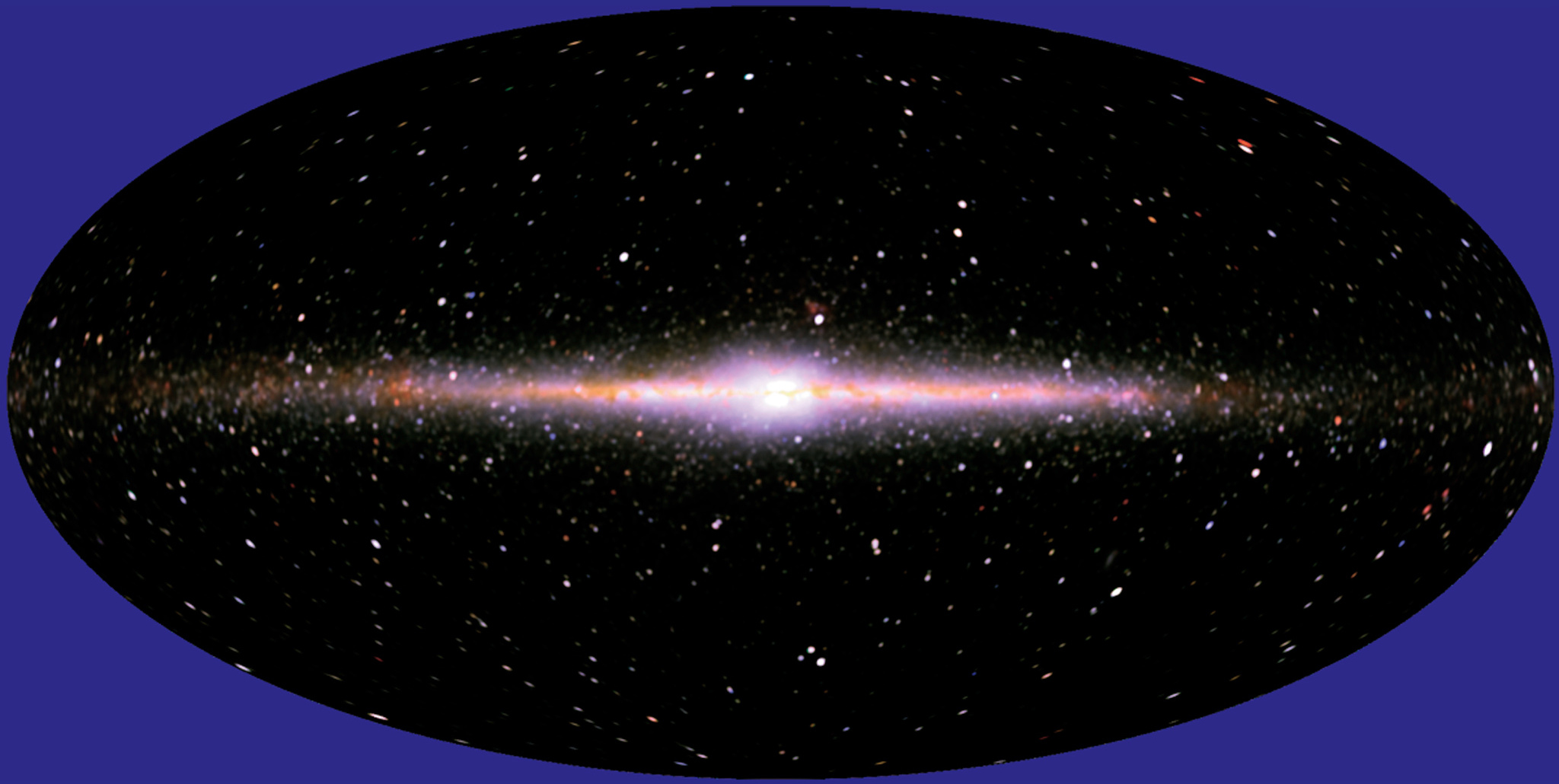
"Near-infrared sky as seen by the DIRBE. Data at 1.25, 2.2, and 3.5 μm wavelengths are represented respectively as blue, green and red colors" - NASA

The Cosmic Background Explorer (COBE) mission was launched in November 1989. The spacecraft contained liquid helium that cooled the DIRBE instrument to below 2K to allow it to image in the infrared wavelengths. Primary observation started December 11, 1989 and ran until September 21, 1990, when the liquid helium ran out. After that date only observations in the 1.25 to 4.9 micrometer bands could be carried out, at about 20% of original sensitivity.

The DIRBE instrument was an absolute radiometer with an off-axis folded-Gregorian reflecting telescope, with 19 cm diameter aperture.

== See also ==
- COBE — DIRBE
- Infrared astronomy
- Cosmic infrared background
- List of largest infrared telescopes

== Other infrared surveys ==
- IRAS 1983
- WISE 2010
- SPHEREx 2025
- Nancy Grace Roman Space Telescope 2027 (planned)
