= Orbital Maneuvering System =

Hypergolic orbital maneuvering engines used on NASA's Space Shuttle

Space Shuttle OMS/RCS Pod
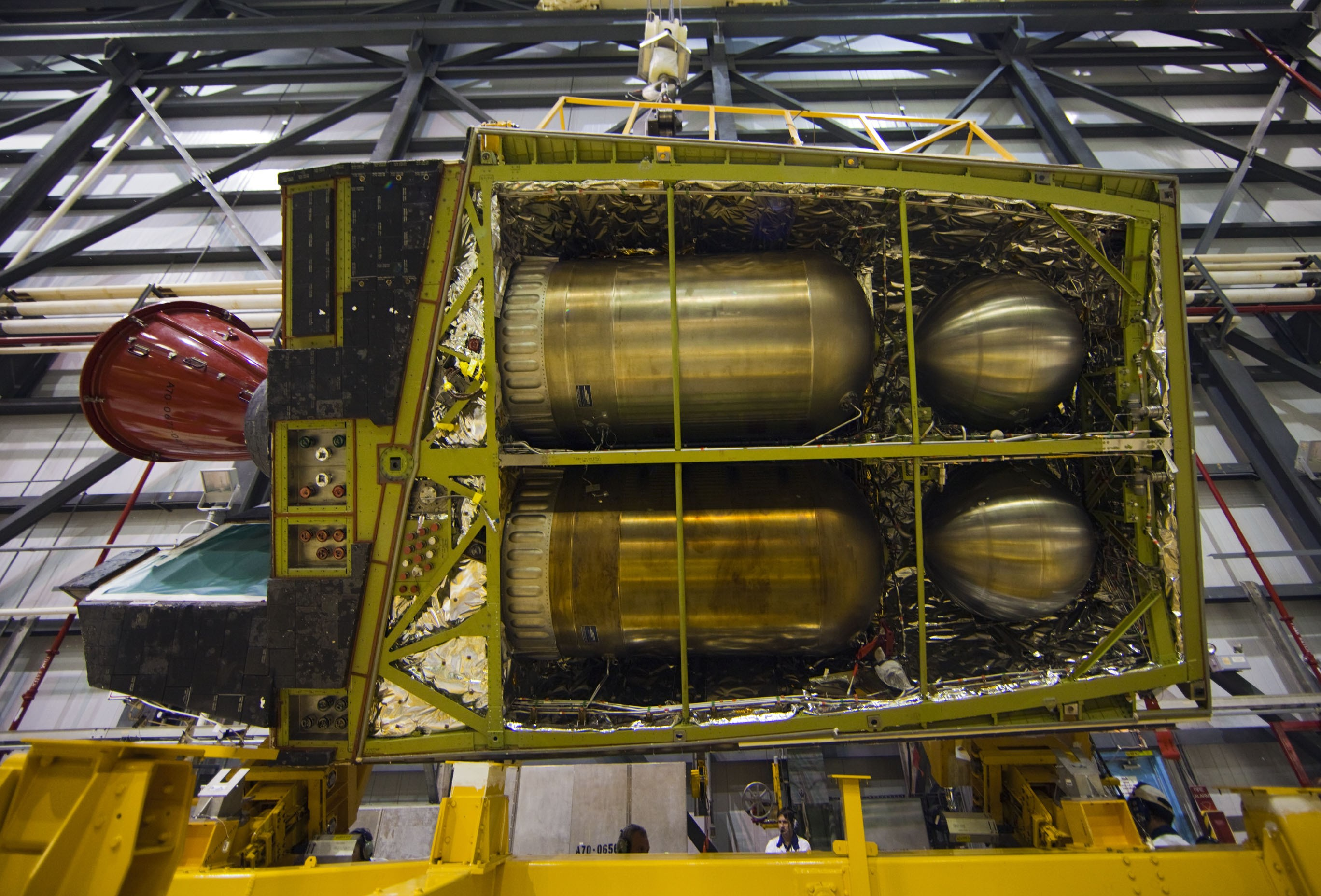
- The underside of a left OMS/RCS pod on Space Shuttle Endeavour
- Manufacturer: Aerojet
- Country of origin: United States
- Used on: Space Shuttle/Orion European Service Module

General characteristics
- Length: 21.8 ft (6.6 m)
- Width: 11.37 ft (3.47 m) (aft); 8.14 ft (2.48 m) (forward)

Launch history
- Status: Pod: Retired; Engines: Active
- Total launches: Space Shuttle: 135; Orion: 2
- Successes (stage only): Space Shuttle: 134; Orion: 2
- Lower stage failed: 1 (STS-51-L)
- First flight: April 12, 1981 (STS-1)
- Last flight: Space Shuttle: July 8, 2011 (STS-135); Orion: April 1, 2026 (Artemis II)

OMS Engine
- Powered by: 1 × AJ10-190
- Maximum thrust: 26.7 kN (6,000 lb_{f})
- Specific impulse: 316 s (3.10 km/s)
- Burn time: 15 hours (maximum service life); 1,250 seconds (deorbit burn); 150–250 seconds (typical burn)
- Propellant: MMH/MON-3

Aft Primary RCS
- Powered by: Primary RCS engines
- Maximum thrust: 3.87 kN (870 lb_{f})
- Burn time: Up to 150 seconds (each burn); 800 seconds (total)
- Propellant: MMH/MON-3

Aft Vernier RCS
- Powered by: Vernier RCS engines
- Maximum thrust: 106 N (24 lb_{f})
- Burn time: Up to 125 seconds (each burn)
- Propellant: MMH/MON-3

The Orbital Maneuvering System (OMS) is a system of hypergolic liquid-propellant rocket engines used on the Space Shuttle and the Orion spacecraft. Designed and manufactured in the United States by Aerojet, the system allowed the orbiter to perform various orbital maneuvers according to requirements of each mission profile: orbital injection after main engine cutoff, orbital corrections during flight, and the final deorbit burn for reentry. From STS-90 onwards the OMS were typically ignited part-way into the Shuttle's ascent for a few minutes to aid acceleration to orbital insertion. Notable exceptions were particularly high-altitude missions such as those supporting the Hubble Space Telescope (STS-31) or those with unusually heavy payloads such as Chandra (STS-93). An OMS dump burn also occurred on STS-51-F, as part of the Abort to Orbit procedure.

== Overview ==
The OMS consists of two pods mounted on the orbiter's aft fuselage, on either side of the vertical stabilizer. Each pod contains a single AJ10-190 engine, based on the Apollo Service Module's Service Propulsion System engine, which produces 26.7 kilonewtons (6,000 lb_{f}) of thrust with a specific impulse (I_{sp}) of 316 seconds. The oxidizer-to-fuel ratio is 1.65-to-1, The expansion ratio of the nozzle exit to the throat is 55-to-1, and the chamber pressure of the engine is 8.6 bar. The dry weight of each engine is 118kg (260lb). Each engine could be reused for 100 missions and was capable of a total of 1,000 starts and 15 hours of burn time.

These pods also contained the Orbiter's aft set of reaction control system (RCS) engines, and so were referred to as OMS/RCS pods. The OM engine and RCS both burned monomethylhydrazine (MMH) as fuel, which was oxidized with MON-3 (mixed oxides of nitrogen, 3% nitric acid), with the propellants being stored in tanks within the OMS/RCS pod, alongside other fuel and engine management systems. When full, the pods together carried around 4,087 kilograms (9,010 lb) of MMH and 6,743 kilograms (14,866 lb) of MON-3, allowing the OMS to produce a total delta-v of around 305 metres per second (1,000 ft/s) with a 29,000-kilogram (64,000 lb) payload.

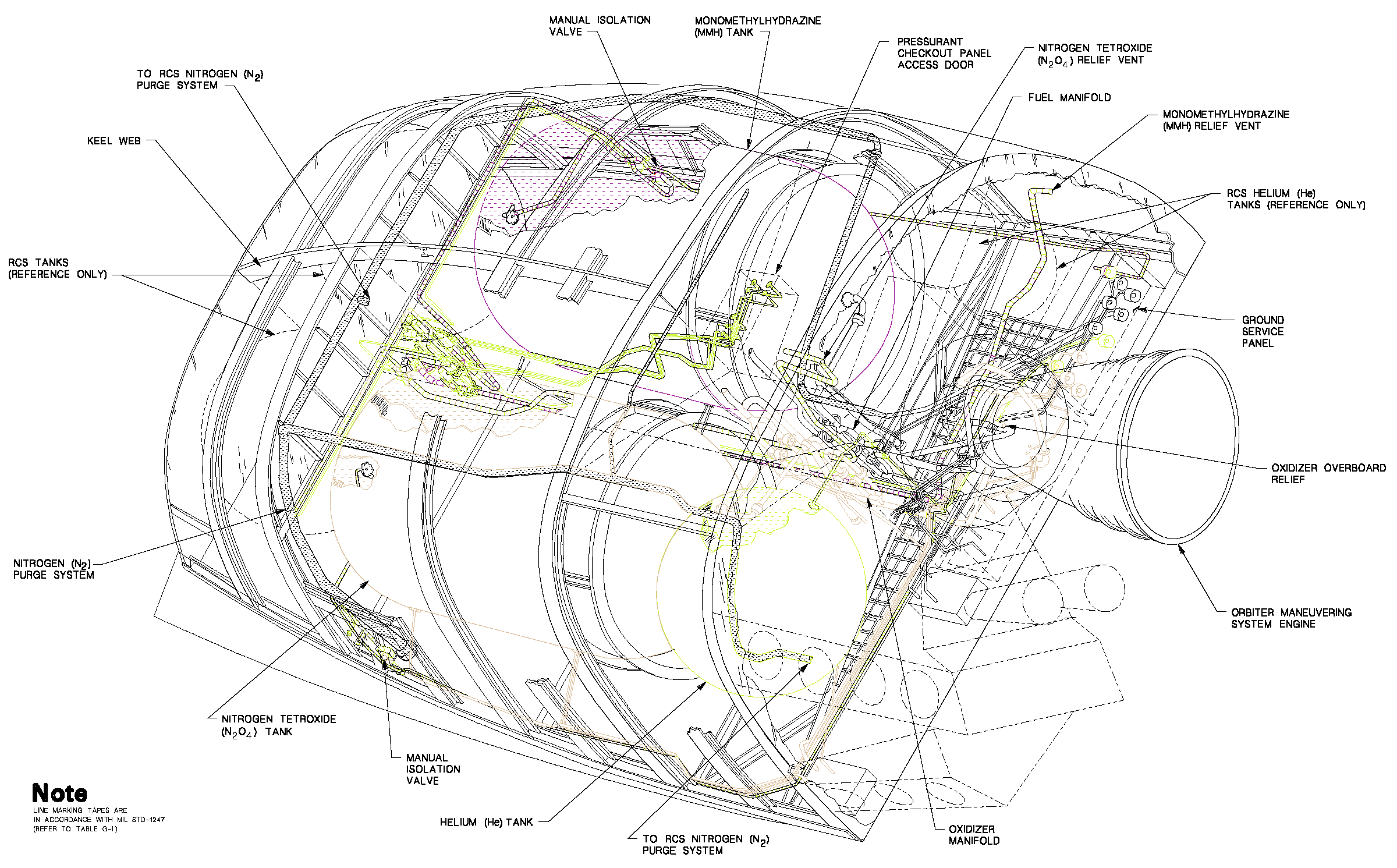
Diagram of OMS pod components

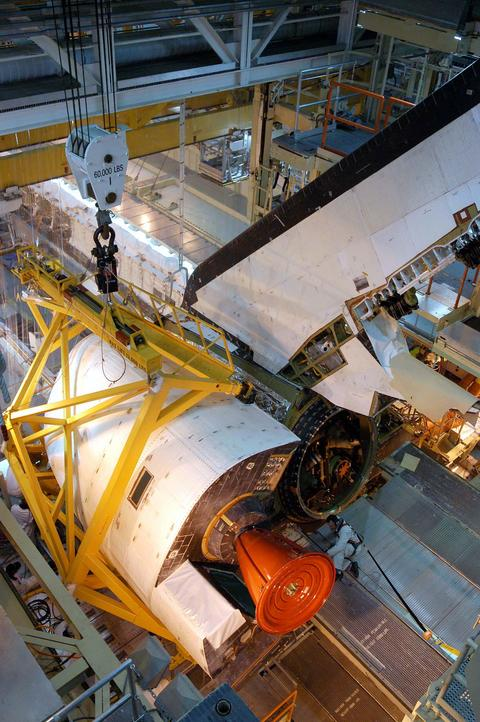
An OMS pod detached from an orbiter for maintenance

== Proposed OMS Payload Bay Kit ==
It was never built, but to augment the OMS an OMS Payload Bay Kit was proposed. It would have used one, two or three sets of OMS tanks, installed in the payload bay, to provide an extra 150 m/s, 300 m/s or 450 m/s (490 ft/s, 980 ft/s or 1,500 ft/s) of delta-V to the orbiter. The orbiter control panels had related switches and gauges but they were nonfunctional.

== Orion ESM main engine ==
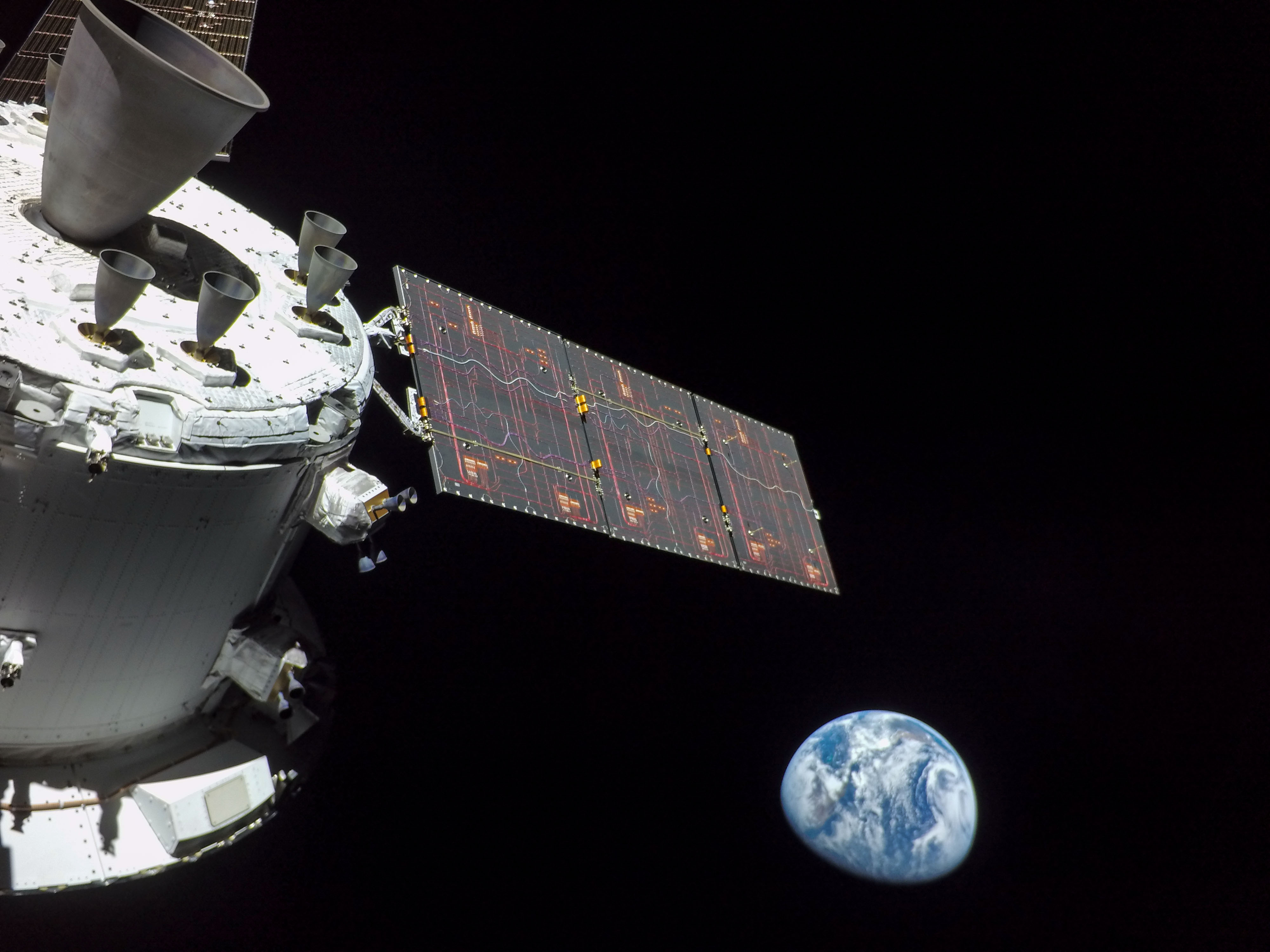
Orion ESM main engine at the top left on the service module

Following the retirement of the Space Shuttle, these engines were repurposed for use on the Orion spacecraft's service module. This variant uses monomethylhydrazine as fuel, with MON-3 (mixed oxides of nitrogen) as oxidizer. It is planned to be used for the first six flights of the Artemis program; afterwards it would be replaced by a new "Orion Main Engine" starting with Artemis 7.
