= Firas Suleiman =

- Born: Firas Suleiman
- Citizenship: Syria
- Occupations: Writer and poet
- Notable work: The city I live in away is the pavement of the shaggy margins, and the man with the molar is a woman whose mirror is an unarmed hunter with broken.

Firas Suleiman is a Syrian poet and writer who started writing and publishing in the last decade of the twentieth century. Firas has published a number of books and poetry collections, the most prominent of these books are "The City I Live Far Away" published in 1989, "Al-Raseef" published in 1992, "Margin" published in 1995, and "the Unkempt and the Misguided Man" which was published a year later. Firas waited until 2004 when he published a new book entitled "Amraa Mraatoha Saiyad Aazal". Moreover, his most famous work is the collection of short stories released in 2015, which was entitled "Niyayat Mu'atalah".

== Career ==
It was stated by the series "Arab Creativity" issued by the Egyptian General Book Organization, and its editor-in-chief, the poet Samir Darwish, that the most famous poetry collection by the Syrian writer and poet Firas Suleiman is "Finally, they arrived… but in coffins." The divan consisted of 140 pages of medium volume, and consists of three parts: the first part is entitled (I am He), in which the poet embodies the voice of a man who seems afraid of all things. The second part is entitled (I am She) in which borrows the voice of a tired but daring woman; As for the third part, it is a long poem, entitled “He left you… He is still leaving you so that he does not imitate you.” which comes as an echo of the previous two voices, but with the tone of different poetry.

Firas Suleiman also published a book entitled " Niyayat Mu'atalah" on the publications of Almotawaset in Italy in 2015, in which Firas clearly defined his view of the world. In this book, Firas watched the world to its ends, but as he often says, it reached dead ends. The book was only 87 pages only, and it was divided into two main sections: “A Tent with Many Holes” and “Diary of a Basement Man”. In the first part, Firas focuses on the saying that it is not possible to see things from a tent, no matter how many holes in it, or from a basement, except with a keen eye, which desires to maintain a certain distance from the world. He chooses many characters to say what he wants to say, or what he does not want to say in his explicit name.

Firas navigates – as he says himself – in his books, which he considers as journeys about identity. In the second section of the poetic collection, Firas moves from looking outside, towards contemplating the inside to confront the world with the conscience of the speaker alone. This group was considered by some critics as a poetic ocean of ideas in which the writer showed his skills in adapting the language, to paint a poetic scene. However, other critics thought that the poet knows well the importance of balancing between the content of what he wants to say, and the importance of the method in presenting his saying.

In his writings, Firas Suleiman focuses on what he calls the Syrian tragedy between the past, the present and the future. He also talks about life under the weight of war and what he describes as the ghostly existence that besieged the self whether inside and outside.

== The List of His Works ==
This is a list of the most prominent works of the Syrian writer and poet, Firas Suleiman:

"Almadeena Allaty Askonoha baeedan" (1989)

"Raseef"(1992)

"Margins" (1995)

"The Unkempt and the Misguided Man" (1996)

"Amraa Mraatoha Saiyad Aazal" (2004)

" Niyayat Mu'atalah " (2015)

"My ghost comes out of me every morning.

I don't notice he's coming back. I thought under the illusion that inside me there is a city of ghosts,

but that it was only yesterday. I saw him,

my ghost, who for many years had not ceased to come out and enter,

I saw him carrying nails and a hammer.

Those spoils are from the outside. Now he is crucifying himself inside my body

what pain my beautiful ghost has to endure!

The world has insulted him so much"

This is a part of Firas Selman's collection of poetry, which was published under the title "Niyayat Mu'atalah".
