= Cosmic Background Explorer =

NASA satellite of the Explorer program

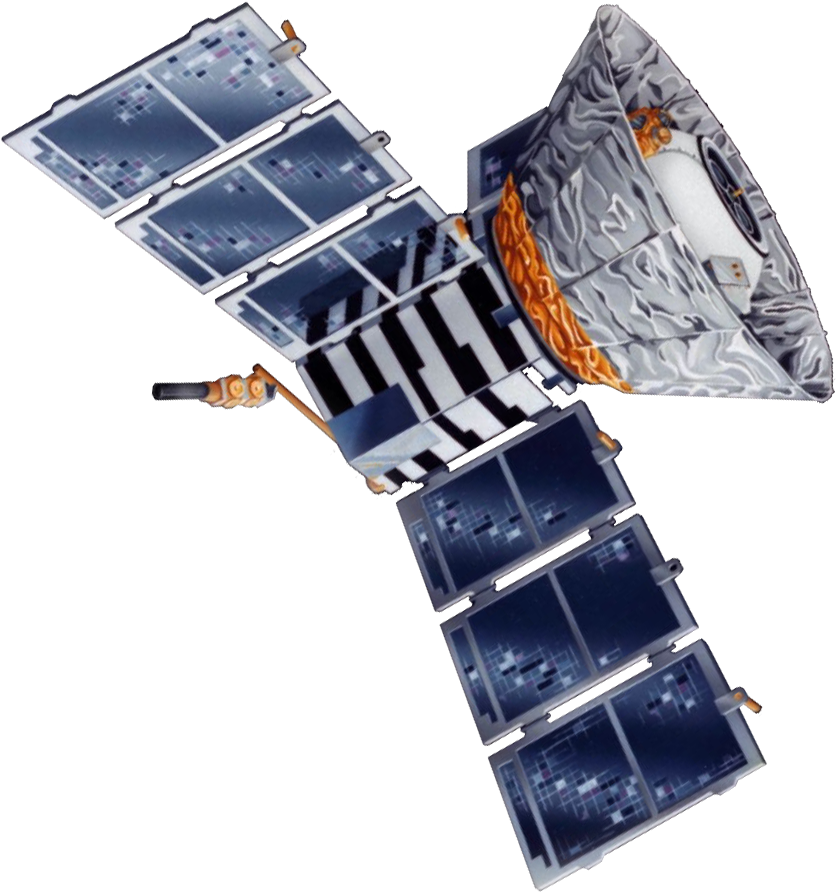
- Artist's concept of the COBE spacecraft
- Names: Explorer 66; COBE
- Mission type: Cosmic microwave background Astronomy
- Operator: NASA
- COSPAR ID: 1989-089A
- SATCAT no.: 20322
- Website: lambda.gsfc.nasa.gov/product/cobe
- Mission duration: 6 months (planned); 4 years, 1 month and 4 days (achieved)

Spacecraft properties
- Spacecraft: Explorer LXVI
- Spacecraft type: Cosmic Background Explorer
- Bus: COBE
- Manufacturer: Goddard Space Flight Center
- Launch mass: 2,206 kg (4,863 lb)
- Dry mass: 1,408 kg (3,104 lb)
- Dimensions: 5.49 × 2.44 m (18.0 × 8.0 ft)
- Power: 750 watts

Start of mission
- Launch date: 18 November 1989, 14:34 UTC
- Rocket: Delta 5920-8 (Delta 189)
- Launch site: Vandenberg, SLC-2W
- Contractor: Douglas Aircraft Company
- Entered service: 18 November 1989

End of mission
- Deactivated: 23 December 1993

Orbital parameters
- Reference system: Geocentric orbit
- Regime: Sun-synchronous orbit
- Perigee altitude: 900 km (560 mi)
- Apogee altitude: 900 km (560 mi)
- Inclination: 99.00°
- Period: 103.00 minutes

Instruments
- Differential Microwave Radiometer (DMR); Diffuse Infrared Background Experiment (DIRBE); Far-InfraRed Absolute Spectrophotometer (FIRAS)
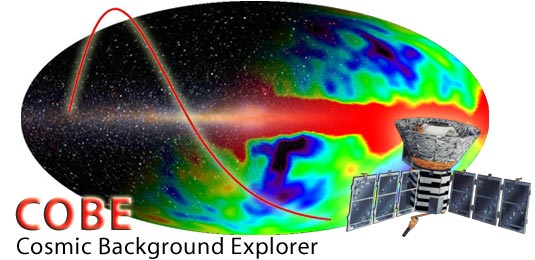
- Cosmic Background Explorer mission patch Explorer program

The Cosmic Background Explorer (COBE /ˈkoʊbi/ KOH-bee), also referred to as Explorer 66, was a NASA satellite dedicated to cosmology, which operated from 1989 to 1993. Its goals were to investigate the cosmic microwave background radiation (CMB or CMBR) of the universe and provide measurements that would help shape the understanding of the cosmos.

COBE's measurements provided two key pieces of evidence that supported the Big Bang theory of the universe: that the CMB has a near-perfect black-body spectrum, and that it has very faint anisotropies. Two of COBE's principal investigators, George F. Smoot III and John C. Mather, received the Nobel Prize in Physics in 2006 for their work on the project. According to the Nobel Prize committee, "the COBE project can also be regarded as the starting point for cosmology as a precision science".

COBE was the second cosmic microwave background satellite, following RELIKT-1, and was followed by two more advanced spacecraft: the Wilkinson Microwave Anisotropy Probe (WMAP) operated from 2001 to 2010 and the Planck spacecraft from 2009 to 2013.

== Mission ==
The purpose of the Cosmic Background Explorer (COBE) mission was to take precise measurements of the diffuse radiation between 1 micrometre and 1 cm (0.39 in) over the whole celestial sphere. The following quantities were measured: (1) the spectrum of the 3 K radiation over the range 100 micrometres to 1 cm (0.39 in) (2) the anisotropy of this radiation from 3 to 10 mm (0.39 in); and, (3) the spectrum and angular distribution of diffuse infrared background radiation at wavelengths from 1 to 300 micrometres.

== History ==
In 1974, NASA issued an Announcement of Opportunity for astronomical missions that would use a small- or medium-sized Explorer spacecraft. Out of the 121 proposals received, three dealt with studying the cosmological background radiation. Though these proposals lost out to the Infrared Astronomical Satellite (IRAS), their strength made NASA further explore the idea. In 1976, NASA formed a committee of members from each of 1974's three proposal teams to put together their ideas for such a satellite. A year later, this committee suggested a polar-orbiting satellite called COBE to be launched by either a Delta 5920-8 launch vehicle or the Space Shuttle. It would contain the following instruments:

Instruments
| Instrument | Acronym | Description | Principal Investigator |
|---|---|---|---|
| Differential Microwave Radiometer | DMR | Microwave instrument that would map variations (or anisotropies) in the Cosmic microwave background (CMB) radiation | George F. Smoot III |
| Diffuse Infrared Background Experiment | DIRBE | Multiwavelength infrared detector used to map dust emission | Michael G. Hauser |
| Far-InfraRed Absolute Spectrophotometer | FIRAS | Spectrophotometer used to measure the spectrum of the CMB | John C. Mather |

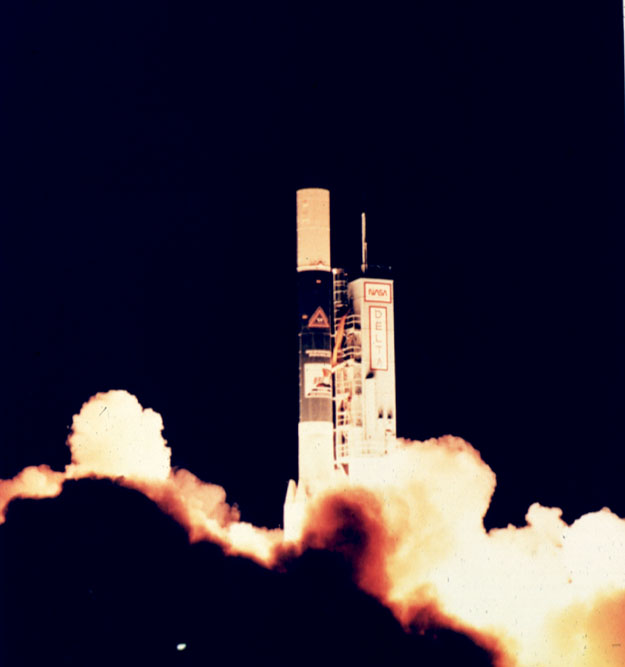
Launch of the COBE spacecraft on 18 November 1989.

NASA accepted the proposal provided that the costs be kept under US$30 million, excluding launcher and data analysis. Due to cost overruns in the Explorer program due to IRAS, work on constructing the satellite at Goddard Space Flight Center (GSFC) did not begin until 1981. To save costs, the infrared detectors and liquid helium dewar on COBE would be similar to those used on the Infrared Astronomical Satellite (IRAS).

COBE was originally planned to be launched on a Space Shuttle mission STS-82-B in 1988 from Vandenberg Air Force Base, but the Challenger explosion delayed this plan when the Shuttles were grounded. NASA prevented COBE's engineers from going to other space companies to launch COBE, and eventually a redesigned COBE was placed into Sun-synchronous orbit on 18 November 1989 aboard a Delta launch vehicle.

On 23 April 1992, COBE scientists announced at the APS April Meeting in Washington, D.C. the finding of the "primordial seeds" (CMBE anisotropy) in data from the DMR instrument; until then the other instruments were "unable to see the template." The following day The New York Times ran the story on the front page, explaining the finding as "the first evidence revealing how an initially smooth cosmos evolved into today's panorama of stars, galaxies and gigantic clusters of galaxies."

The Nobel Prize in Physics for 2006 was jointly awarded to John C. Mather, NASA Goddard Space Flight Center, and George F. Smoot III, University of California, Berkeley, "for their discovery of the blackbody form and anisotropy of the cosmic microwave background radiation".

== Spacecraft ==
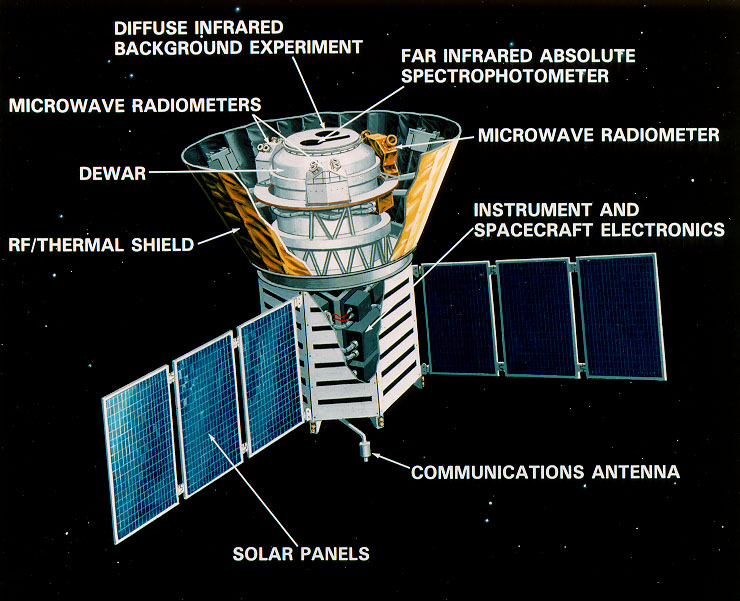
Diagram of COBE spacecraft

COBE was an Explorer class satellite, with technology borrowed heavily from IRAS, but with some unique characteristics.

The need to control and measure all the sources of systematic errors required a rigorous and integrated design. COBE would have to operate for a minimum of 6 months and constrain the amount of radio interference from the ground, COBE and other satellites as well as radiative interference from the Earth, Sun and Moon. The instruments required temperature stability and to maintain gain, and a high level of cleanliness to reduce entry of stray light and thermal emission from particulates.

The need to control systematic error in the measurement of the CMB anisotropy and measuring the zodiacal cloud at different elongation angles for subsequent modeling required that the satellite rotate at a 0.8 rpm spin rate. The spin axis is also tilted back from the orbital velocity vector as a precaution against possible deposits of residual atmospheric gas on the optics as well as against the infrared glow that would result from fast neutral particles hitting its surfaces at extremely high speed.

In order to meet the twin demands of slow rotation and three-axis attitude control, a sophisticated pair of yaw angular momentum wheels were employed with their axis oriented along the spin axis . These wheels were used to carry an angular momentum opposite that of the entire spacecraft in order to create a zero net angular momentum system.

The orbit would prove to be determined based on the specifics of the spacecraft's mission. The overriding considerations were the need for full sky coverage, the need to eliminate stray radiation from the instruments and the need to maintain thermal stability of the dewar and the instruments. A circular Sun-synchronous orbit satisfied all these requirements. A 900 km (560 mi) altitude orbit with a 99° inclination was chosen as it fit within the capabilities of either a Space Shuttle (with an auxiliary propulsion on COBE) or a Delta launch vehicle. This altitude was a good compromise between Earth's radiation and the charged particles in Earth's radiation belts at higher altitudes. An ascending node at 18:00 was chosen to allow COBE to follow the boundary between sunlight and darkness on Earth throughout the year.

The orbit combined with the spin axis made it possible to keep the Earth and the Sun continually below the plane of the shield, allowing a full sky scan every six months.

The last two important parts pertaining to the COBE mission were the dewar and Sun-Earth shield. The dewar was a 650 L (140 imp gal; 170 US gal) superfluid helium cryostat designed to keep the FIRAS and DIRBE instruments cooled during the duration of the mission. It was based on the same design as one used on IRAS and was able to vent helium along the spin axis near the communication arrays. The conical Sun-Earth shield protected the instruments from direct solar and Earth-based radiation as well as radio interference from Earth and the COBE's transmitting antenna. Its multilayer insulating blankets provided thermal isolation for the dewar.

In January 1994, engineering operations concluded and the operation of the spacecraft was transferred to Wallops Flight Facility (WFF) for use as a test satellite.

=== Instruments ===
==== Differential Microwave Radiometers (DMR) ====
The Differential Microwave Radiometer (DMR) investigation uses three differential radiometers to map the sky at 31.4, 53, and 90 GHz. The radiometers are distributed around the outer surface of the cryostat. Each radiometer employs a pair of horn antennas viewing at 30° from the spin axis of the spacecraft, measuring the differential temperature between points in the sky separated by 60°. At each frequency, there are two channels for dual-polarization measurements for improved sensitivity and for reliability. Each radiometer is a microwave receiver whose input is switched rapidly between the two horn antennas, obtaining the difference in brightness of two fields of view 7° in diameter located 60° apart and 30° from the axis of the spacecraft. High sensitivity is achieved by temperature stabilization (at 300 K for 31.4 GHz and at 140 K for 53 and 90 GHz), by spacecraft spin, and by the ability to integrate over the entire year. Sensitivity to large-scale anisotropies is about 3E-5 K. The instrument weighs 120 kg (260 lb), uses 114 watts, and has a data rate of 500 bit/s.

==== Diffuse Infrared Background Experiment (DIRBE) ====
The Diffuse Infrared Background Experiment (DIRBE) consists of a cryogenically cooled (to 2 K) multiband radiometer used to investigate diffuse infrared radiation from 1 to 300 micrometres. The instrument measures the absolute flux in 10 wavelength bands with a 1° field of view pointed 30° off the spin axis. Detectors (photoconductors) and filters for the 8 to 100 micrometre channels are the same as for the IRAS mission. Bolometers are used for the longest wavelength channel (120 to 300 micrometres). The telescope is a well baffled, off-axis, Gregorian flux collector with re-imaging. The instrument weighs approximately 34 kg (75 lb), uses 100 W and has a data rate of 1700 bit/s.

==== Far Infrared Absolute Spectrophotometer (FIRAS) ====
The Far Infrared Absolute Spectrophotometer (FIRAS) is a cryogenically cooled polarizing Michelson interferometer used as a Fourier transform spectrometer. The instrument points along the spin axis and has a 7° field of view. This device measures the spectrum to a precision of 1/1000 of the peak flux at 1.7 mm (0.067 in) for each 7° field of view on the sky (over the range 0.1 to 10 mm (0.39 in)). The FIRAS uses a special flared trumpet horn flux collector having very low sidelobe levels and an external calibrator covering the entire beam; precise temperature regulation and calibration are required. The instrument has a differential input to compare the sky with an internal reference at 3 K. This feature provides immunity from systematic errors in the spectrometer and contributes significantly to the ability to detect small deviations from a blackbody spectrum. The instrument weighs 60 kg (130 lb), uses 84 watts and has a data rate of 1200 bit/s.

== Scientific findings ==
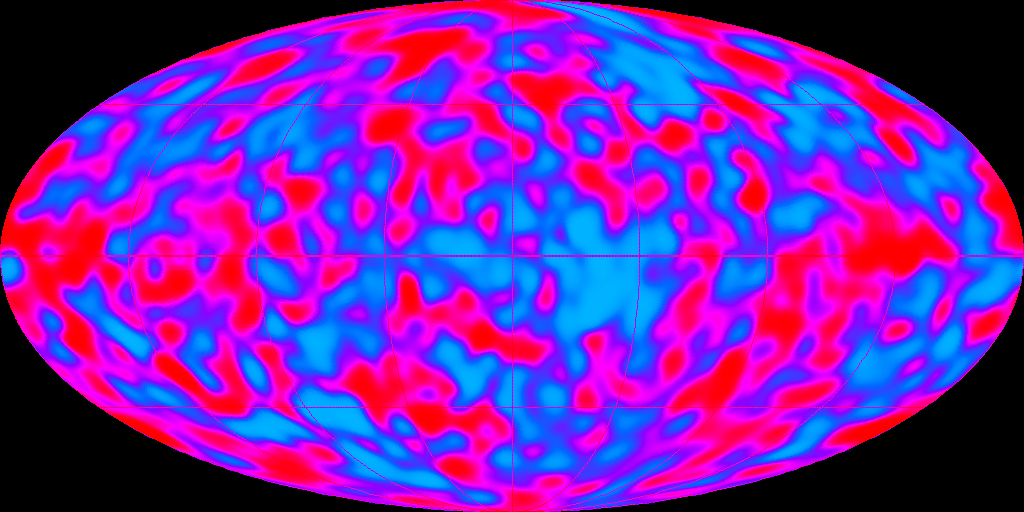
The map of the CMB anisotropy formed from data taken by the COBE spacecraft.

The science mission was conducted by the three instruments detailed previously: DIRBE, FIRAS and DMR. The instruments overlapped in wavelength coverage, providing consistency check on measurements in the regions of spectral overlap and assistance in discriminating signals from our galaxy, Solar System and CMB.

COBE's instruments would fulfill each of their objectives as well as making observations that would have implications outside COBE's initial scope.

=== Black-body curve of CMB ===
Data from COBE showed a perfect fit between the black body curve predicted by big bang theory and that observed in the microwave background. The error bars are smaller than the width of the blue curve. The red crosses merely locate the data points.

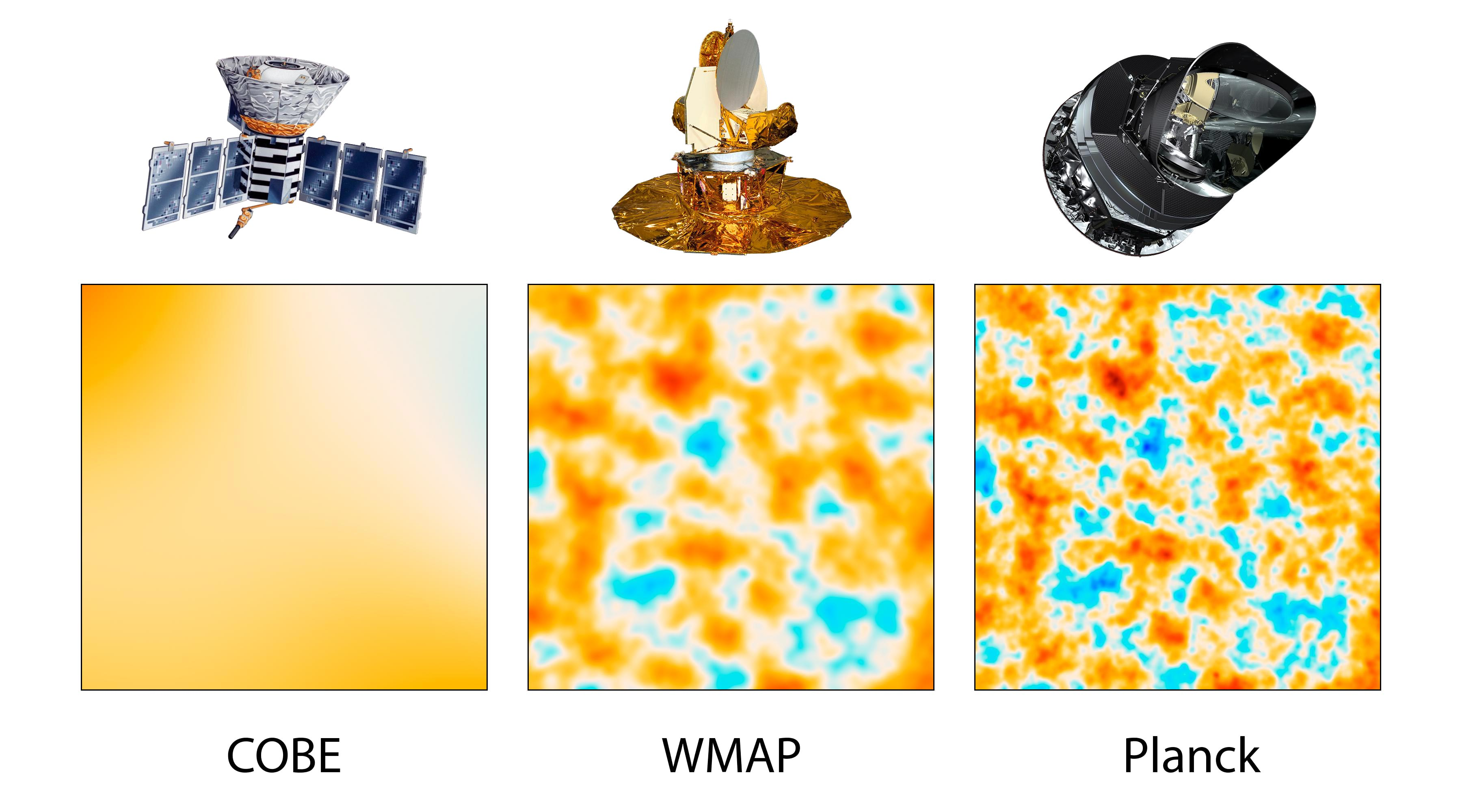
Comparison of CMB results from COBE, WMAP and Planck - 21 March 2013.

During the 15-year-long period between the proposal and launch of COBE, there were two significant astronomical developments:

- First, in 1981, two teams of astronomers, one led by David Wilkinson of Princeton University and the other by Francesco Melchiorri of the University of Florence, simultaneously announced that they detected a quadrupole distribution of CMB using balloon-borne instruments. This finding would have been the detection of the black-body distribution of CMB that FIRAS on COBE was to measure. In particular, the Florence group claimed a detection of intermediate angular scale anisotropies at the level 100 microkelvins in agreement with later measurements made by the BOOMERanG experiment. However, a number of other experiments attempted to duplicate their results and were unable to do so.
- Second, in 1987 a Japanese-American team led by Andrew E. Lange and Paul Richards of University of California, Berkeley and Toshio Matsumoto of Nagoya University made an announcement that CMB was not that of a true black body. In a sounding rocket experiment, they detected an excess brightness at 0.5 and 0.7 mm (0.028 in) wavelengths.

With these developments serving as a backdrop to COBE's mission, scientists eagerly awaited results from FIRAS. The results of FIRAS were startling in that they showed a perfect fit of the CMB and the theoretical curve for a black body at a temperature of 2.7 K, in contrast to the Berkeley-Nagoya results.

FIRAS measurements were made by measuring the spectral difference between a 7° patch of the sky against an internal black body. The interferometer in FIRAS covered between 2 and 95 cm^{−1} in two bands separated at 20 cm^{−1}. There are two scan lengths (short and long) and two scan speeds (fast and slow) for a total of four different scan modes. The data were collected over a ten-month period.

=== Intrinsic anisotropy of CMB ===
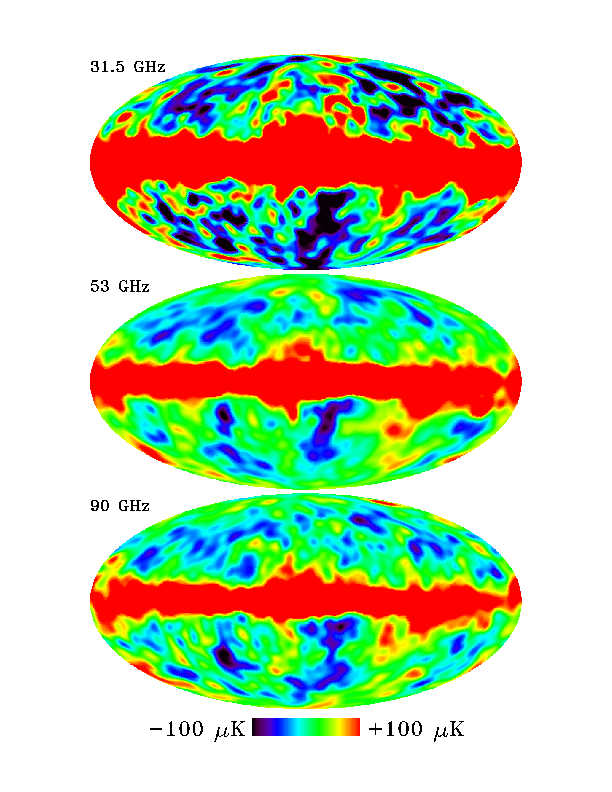
Data obtained at each of the three DMR frequencies — 31.5, 53, and 90 GHz — following dipole subtraction.

The DMR was able to spend four years mapping the detectable anisotropy of cosmic background radiation as it was the only instrument not dependent on the dewar's supply of helium to keep it cooled. This operation was able to create full sky maps of the CMB by subtracting out galactic emissions and dipole at various frequencies. The cosmic microwave background fluctuations are extremely faint, only one part in 100,000 compared to the 2.73 K average temperature of the radiation field. The cosmic microwave background radiation is a remnant of the Big Bang and the fluctuations are the imprint of density contrast in the early universe. The density ripples are believed to have produced structure formation as observed in the universe today: clusters of galaxies and vast regions devoid of galaxies.

=== Detecting early galaxies ===
DIRBE also detected 10 new far-IR emitting galaxies in the region not surveyed by IRAS as well as nine other candidates in the weak far-IR that may be spiral galaxies. Galaxies that were detected at the 140 and 240 μm were also able to provide information on very cold dust (VCD). At these wavelengths, the mass and temperature of VCD can be derived. When these data were joined with 60 and 100 μm data taken from IRAS, it was found that the far-infrared luminosity arises from cold (≈17–22 K) dust associated with diffuse H I region cirrus clouds, 15-30% from cold (≈19 K) dust associated with molecular gas, and less than 10% from warm (≈29 K) dust in the extended low-density H II regions.

=== DIRBE ===
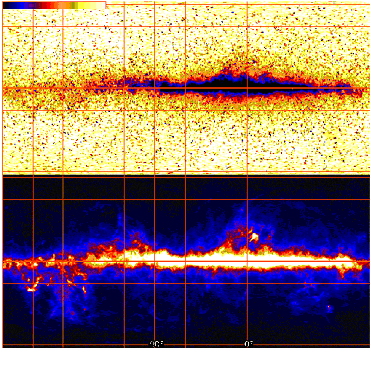
Model of the Galactic disk as seen edge-on from Earth's position.

On top of the findings DIRBE had on galaxies, it also made two other significant contributions to science. The DIRBE instrument was able to conduct studies on interplanetary dust (IPD) and determine if its origin was from asteroid or cometary particles. The DIRBE data collected at 12, 25, 50 and 100 μm were able to conclude that grains of asteroidal origin populate the IPD bands and the smooth IPD cloud.

The second contribution DIRBE made was a model of the Galactic disk as seen edge-on from our position. According to the model, if the Sun is 8.6 kpc from the Galactic Center, then it is 15.6% above the midplane of the disk, which has a radial and vertical scale lengths of 2.64 and 0.333 kpc, respectively, and is warped in a way consistent with the HI layer. There is also no indication of a thick disk.

To create this model, the IPD had to be subtracted out of the DIRBE data. It was found that this cloud, which as seen from Earth is Zodiacal light, was not centered on the Sun, as previously thought, but on a place in space a few million kilometers away. This is due to the gravitation influence of Saturn and Jupiter.

=== Cosmological implications ===
In addition to the science results detailed in the last section, there are numerous cosmological questions left unanswered by COBE's results. A direct measurement of the extragalactic background light (EBL) can also provide important constraints on the integrated cosmological history of star formation, metal and dust production, and the conversion of starlight into infrared emissions by dust.

By looking at the results from DIRBE and FIRAS in the 140 to 5000 μm we can detect that the integrated EBL intensity is ≈16 nW/(m^{2}·sr). This is consistent with the energy released during nucleosynthesis and constitutes about 20–50% of the total energy released in the formation of helium and metals throughout the history of the universe. Attributed only to nuclear sources, this intensity implies that more than 5–15% of the baryonic mass density implied by Big Bang nucleosynthesis analysis has been processed in stars to helium and heavier elements.

There were also significant implications into star formation. COBE observations provide important constraints on the cosmic star formation rate and help us calculate the EBL spectrum for various star formation histories. Observation made by COBE require that star formation rate at redshifts of z ≈ 1.5 to be larger than that inferred from UV-optical observations by a factor of 2. This excess stellar energy must be mainly generated by massive stars in yet - undetected dust enshrouded galaxies or extremely dusty star-forming regions in observed galaxies. The exact star formation history cannot unambiguously be resolved by COBE and further observations must be made in the future.

On 30 June 2001, NASA launched a follow-up mission to COBE led by DMR Deputy Principal Investigator Charles L. Bennett. The Wilkinson Microwave Anisotropy Probe has clarified and expanded upon COBE's accomplishments. Following WMAP, the European Space Agency's probe, Planck has continued to increase the resolution at which the background has been mapped.

== Popular culture ==
The Cosmic Background Explorer satellite appeared twice in the season 1 episode of Young Sheldon called "Gluons, Guacamole, and the Color Purple", where a young Sheldon Lee Cooper daydreams of helping NASA save the satellite from crashing back to Earth.

== See also ==
- 9997 COBE, a minor planet named after the experiment.
- S150 Galactic X-Ray Mapping
- Wilkinson Microwave Anisotropy Probe

== Sources ==
- Arny, Thomas T. (2002). Explorations: An Introduction to Astronomy (3rd ed.). Dubuque, Iowa: McGraw-Hill. ISBN 978-0-07-241593-3.
- Liddle, Andrew R.; Lyth, David H. (March 1993) [August 1992]. "The Cold Dark Matter Density Perturbation". Physics Reports. 231 (1–2). Elsevier (published August 1993): 1–105. arXiv:astro-ph/9303019. Bibcode:1993PhR...231....1L. doi:10.1016/0370-1573(93)90114-S. S2CID 119084975.
- Odenwald, Sten; Newmark, Jeffrey; Smoot, George (6 October 1995). "A Study of External Galaxies Detected by the COBE Diffuse Infrared Background Experiment". The Astrophysical Journal. 500 (2). American Astronomical Society (published 20 June 1998): 554–568. arXiv:astro-ph/9610238. Bibcode:1998ApJ...500..554O. doi:10.1086/305737. ISSN 0004-637X. S2CID 18799050.
