= Feras Kilani =

Palestinian-British journalist and film maker

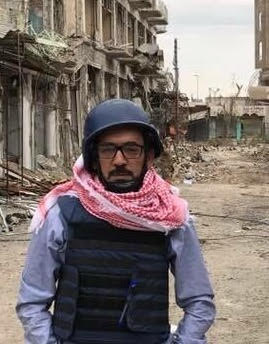
- Born: 2 April 1976 (age 49); Damascus
- Education: Philosophy, University of Damascus
- Occupations: Special correspondent, film maker
- Employer: BBC
- Awards: The Press Freedom Award, International Media Awards Arab Journalism Award, Shortlisted to Frontline Club award

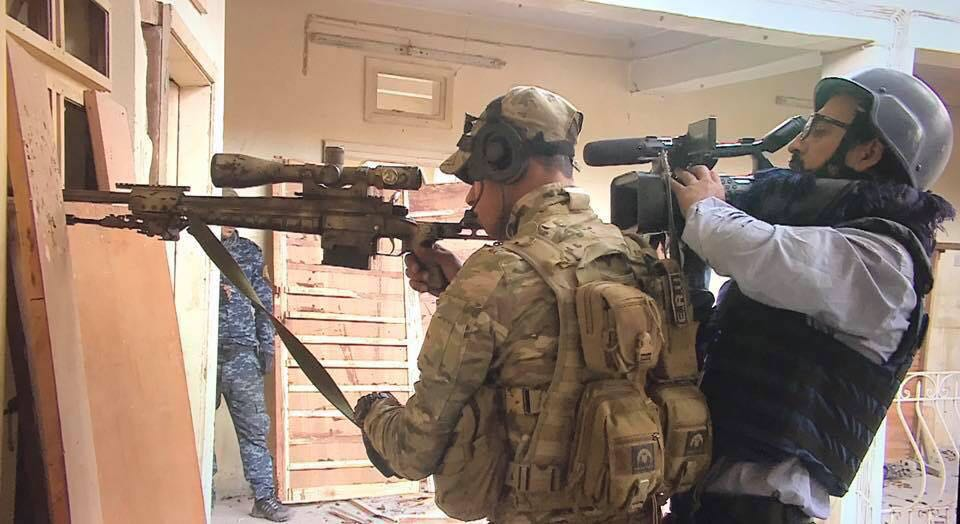
Kilani joined Iraqi snipers as they advanced to the Old City of Mosul.

Feras Kilani (born 2 April 1976) is a Palestinian-British journalist and film maker, and BBC Arabic's special correspondent. He is best known for his coverage in war-zones in the Middle East, specifically reporting from Libya, Iraq and Syria.

== Career ==
He started his media career in 1995, in the Syrian State TV in Damascus where he worked as a Director, and documentary maker until 2006, when he left to join Al Bayan in United Arab Emirates.

Kilani joined BBC World Service in 2009. During his time at the BBC, he was News Editor for 2 of BBC Arabic's flagship programmes, World at One and the Arabic version of Newsnight.

=== Libya uprising ===
On 8 March 2011, while reporting on the Libya uprising for BBC Arabic TV, Kilani was picked up at an army roadblock near Tripoli along with two BBC colleagues. They were imprisoned, beaten and subject to mock executions at Khalat al-Farjan farm behind the Yarmouk headquarters just outside Tripoli. After 22 hours they were released.

=== Syrian conflict ===
Kilani has covered the Syrian conflict for the BBC since it started in 2011.

In 2016, he gained exclusive access to Islamic State-held city of Manbij as Kurdish forces fought to retake it, making him the first international journalist to get inside the city since the start of the battle to force IS out.

=== Battle of Mosul ===
In November 2016, during his coverage for the Battle of Mosul (2016–17) in Iraq, Feras Kilani and cameraman Marek Polaszewski were following soldiers going door to door to clear homes of suspected militants in the city when a car bomb exploded. Video footage showed IS launching a full attack in the confusion that follows.

Kilani said it took three hours for the Iraqi forces to contain the attack.

== Documentaries ==
Kilani directed multiple documentaries during his career. Most of his work with Syrian State TV was not archived, but the documentaries he produced for PBS and the BBC were.

- Awaiting return – Palestinian refugees in Syria (2003)
- Exile: Abdul Rahman Munif's life (2004)
- The Twins: Beirut and Damascus (2005)
- Syyaf Al-Zuhour: Muhammad al-Maghut (2006)
- Libya's Torture Farms (2012)
- The fight for Justice: Nusra Front in Syria (2013)
- The Fight for Benghazi (2016)
