= AJ10 =

Hypergolic rocket engine manufactured by Aerojet

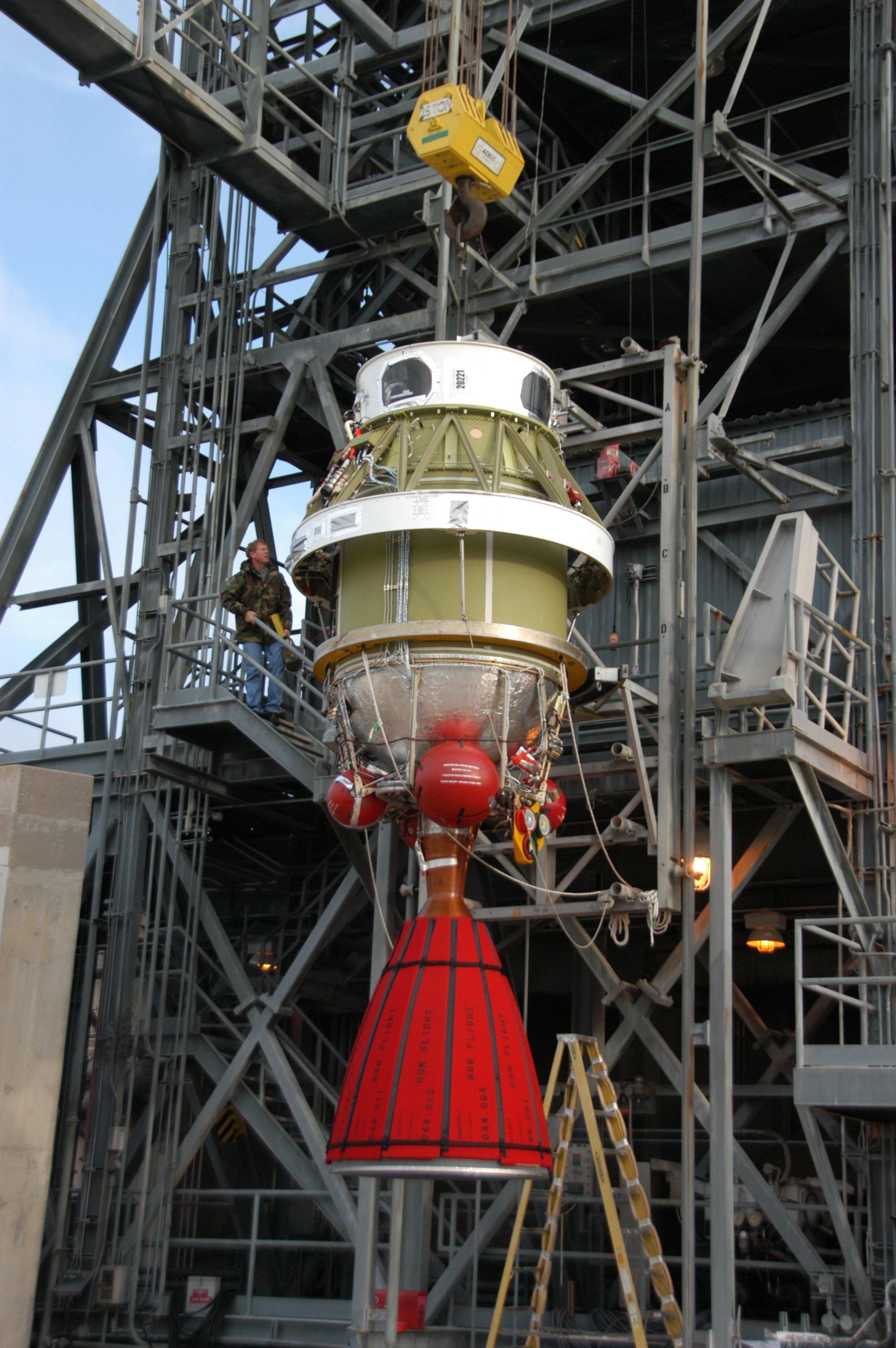
- AJ10-118K
- Country of origin: United States
- Date: 1957–present
- Manufacturer: Aerojet; Aerojet Rocketdyne
- Application: Upper stage
- Status: In use

Liquid-fuel engine
- Propellant: HNO_{3} / UDMH; HNO_{3} / Aniline; N_{2}O_{4} / Aerozine-50; N_{2}O_{4} / CH_{6}N_{2}
- Cycle: Pressure-fed

Configuration
- Chamber: 1

Performance
- Thrust, vacuum: 43.7 kN (9,800 lb_{f})
- Chamber pressure: 7–9 bar (700–900 kPa)
- Specific impulse, vacuum: 270–319 seconds (2.65–3.13 km/s)

Dimensions
- Diameter: 0.84 m (2 ft 9 in)
- Dry mass: 90–100 kg (200–220 lb)

Used in
- Vanguard (Delta-A); Thor/Atlas (Able); Thor-Delta/Delta A-N, Super-Six (Stage 2); Thor-Ablestar (Ablestar); Delta 0100/1000/2000/3000 (Delta-F); Delta 4000/5000/II (Delta-K); Titan III (Transtage); Apollo (service module); Space Shuttle (Orbital Maneuvering System); Orion (service module)

The AJ10 is a hypergolic rocket engine manufactured by Aerojet Rocketdyne (previously Aerojet). It has been used to propel the upper stages of several launch vehicles, including the Delta II and Titan III. Variants were and are used as the service propulsion engine for the Apollo command and service module, in the Space Shuttle Orbital Maneuvering System, and on the European Service Module – part of NASA's Orion spacecraft.

== Variants ==
Many AJ10 engine variations were developed over the years, summarized on the following table:

Model	Propellant	Used on	First flight	Thrust	Notes	Ref
AJ10‑11B	HNO_{3} / UDMH					
AJ10‑21	HNO_{3} / Aniline	Aerobee RV-N-13b				
AJ10‑24	HNO_{3} / Aniline	Aerobee RTV-N-10b		4,002 lbf (17.80 kN)		
AJ10‑25	HNO_{3} / Aniline	Aerobee RTV-A-1a, RTV-A-1c, RTV-N-10a, Aerobee AJ10-25		4,002 lbf (17.80 kN)		
AJ10‑27	HNO_{3} / Aniline	Aerobee AJ10-27		4,002 lbf (17.80 kN)		
AJ10‑34	HNO_{3} / Aniline	Aerobee RTV-N-10c, Aerobee AJ10-34		4,002 lbf (17.80 kN)		
AJ10‑37	HNO_{3} / UDMH	Vanguard	1958		Vanguard second stage	
AJ10‑40	HNO_{3} / UDMH	Thor-Able	1958	7,799 lbf (34.69 kN)	Able stage	
AJ10‑41	HNO_{3} / UDMH	Thor-Able I	1958		Able stage	
AJ10‑42	HNO_{3} / UDMH	Thor-Able II	1959		Able stage	
AJ10‑101	HNO_{3} / UDMH	Atlas-Able, Thor-Able	1958	7,711 lbf (34.30 kN)	ABLE-1 lunar probes	
AJ10‑101A	HNO_{3} / UDMH	Atlas-Able IV, V; Thor-Able III, IV	1959			
AJ10‑104	HNO_{3} / UDMH	Thor-Ablestar	1960	7,891 lbf (35.10 kN)	Ablestar	
AJ10‑104D	HNO_{3} / UDMH	Thor-Ablestar	1963		Ablestar	
AJ10‑118	HNO_{3} / UDMH	Delta A, Thor/ASSET	1960	7,599 lbf (33.80 kN)	Long Tank Able stage for Delta	
AJ10‑118A	HNO_{3} / UDMH	Delta B				
AJ10‑118D	HNO_{3} / UDMH	Delta B, C, D	1962	7,576 lbf (33.70 kN)		
AJ10‑118E	HNO_{3} / UDMH	Delta E, G, J, L, M, N	1965	7,891 lbf (35.10 kN)		
AJ10‑118F	HNO_{3} / UDMH	Delta 0100, 1000	1972	9,307 lbf (41.40 kN)	Transtage derived	
AJ10‑118FJ	HNO_{3} / UDMH	N-II	1981		Transtage derived	
AJ10‑118K	N_{2}O_{4} / Aerozine-50	Delta 4000, 5000, II	1982	9,757 lbf (43.40 kN)	Pressure-fed, altitude-optimized	
AJ10‑131	N_{2}O_{4} / Aerozine-50		1960	2,203 lbf (9.80 kN)	Subscale Apollo Service Propulsion System	
AJ10‑137	N_{2}O_{4} / Aerozine-50	Apollo Service Module		20,500 lbf (91 kN)	Pressure-fed	
AJ10‑138	N_{2}O_{4} / Aerozine-50	Titan IIIC, Titan IIIA, Titan 34D, Titan 3C7	1964	8,003 lbf (35.60 kN)	Originally developed for Vanguard and Able, flown as Transtage	
AJ10‑138A	N_{2}O_{4} / Aerozine-50	Titan IIIC, Titan IIIA, Titan 34D, Titan 3C7			Transtage	
AJ10‑190	N_{2}O_{4} / CH_{6}N_{2}	Shuttle OMS, European Service Module	1981	6,000 lbf (27 kN)	Also called the Orbital Maneuvering Engine (OME). Refurbished shuttle engines used on ESM. Only reusable variant in the AJ10 family.	
AJ10‑198				2,997 lbf (13.33 kN)	Kick stage engine	
AJ10‑196				9,015 lbf (40.10 kN)	Liquid throttling engine.	
Transtar	N_{2}O_{4} / CH_{6}N_{2}	Transtar		3,754 lbf (16.70 kN)	Pump-fed upper stage engine based on Shuttle OMS components.	

=== AJ10-37 ===
The AJ10 engine was first used in the Delta-A/Able second stage of the Vanguard rocket, in the AJ10-37 configuration. It was initially fueled by HNO_{3} and UDMH. An AJ10 engine was first fired in flight during the third Vanguard launch, on 17 March 1958, which successfully placed the Vanguard 1 satellite into orbit.

=== AJ10-101 ===
The AJ10-101 engine was used on an uprated version of the Able stage, used on Atlas-Able and Thor-Able rockets. The first AJ10-101 flight, with a Thor-Able, occurred on 23 April 1958; however, the Thor failed before the upper Able stage fired. The second flight, which saw the first in flight firing of an AJ10-101 engine, occurred on 10 July 1958.

=== AJ10-138 ===
The AJ10-138 engine was originally developed for Vanguard and Able, and was flown from 1964 to 1980. Two of these engines were used in the Titan III GTO Transtage, with thrust uprated from 7,800 lbf (35 kN) to 8,000 lbf (36 kN), and with a higher specific impulse of 311 s (3.05 km/s).

=== AJ10-137 ===
The AJ10-137 engine (20,500 lbf (91 kN) of thrust) was used in the Apollo service module's service propulsion system from first flight in 1966. Trans-Earth injection, from lunar orbit, was the most critical usage of this engine during the Apollo program. This version used Aerozine 50 (a 1:1 mix of UDMH and hydrazine) as fuel and nitrogen tetroxide (N_{2}O_{4}) as oxidizer, rather than the previous nitric acid/UDMH.

=== AJ10-118F ===
The AJ10-118F engine produced 9,000 lbf (40 kN) of thrust and was derived from the AJ10-138 engine used on the Transtage. It was used by the Delta-F upper stage of the Delta 1000 Straight Eight series rocket, starting in 1972. This version also used Aerozine 50 as fuel and nitrogen tetroxide (N_{2}O_{4}) as oxidizer.

=== AJ10-190 ===
The AJ10-190 engine was used on the Space Shuttle Orbital Maneuvering System (OMS) for orbital insertion, on-orbit maneuvers, and de-orbiting, first flown in 1981. They produced 26.7 kilonewtons (6,000 lb_{f}) of thrust with a specific impulse (I_{sp}) of 316 seconds. Following the retirement of the Shuttle, these engines were repurposed for use on the Orion spacecraft's service module. This variant uses CH_{6}N_{2} as fuel, with nitrogen tetroxide (N_{2}O_{4}) as oxidizer.

=== AJ10-118K ===
The AJ10-118K engine was used on the Delta II rocket's upper stage, Delta-K. It used Aerozine 50 as fuel and nitrogen tetroxide (N_{2}O_{4}) as oxidizer. The AJ10-118K engine variant was used from 1989 and retired at the conclusion of the ICESat-2 launch on 15 September 2018.
