= Firas al-Sawwah =

Syrian non-fiction writer, born 1941

- Born: 1941 (age 84–85); Homs, Syria
- Occupations: writer, scholar and researcher
- Writing career
- Genres: history, religion

Firas al-Sawwah (Arabic: فراس السواح, born 1941) is a Syrian writer

Born in Homs, Syria, in 1941, he teaches Arab Civilisation and the history of religions in the Near East at Beijing Foreign Studies University.
