= Feras Hatoum =

Lebanese journalist

Feras Hatoum (Arabic: فراس حاطوم) is a Lebanese journalist who works for New TV (a Lebanon-based satellite channel). He is known for his coverage of the Israeli war in Lebanon in July 2006, and being a witness of the assassination of former Prime Minister of Lebanon Rafik Hariri. Hatoum was held in custody after breaking and entering Muhammad Zuhair Al-Siddiq's home during an investigative mission.

Hatoum is a third-place winner of a 2007 Les Lauréats du Inquirer Award for his research into prison conditions.
