= Mixed oxides of nitrogen =

Solutions of nitric oxide in dinitrogen tetroxide

Mixed oxides of nitrogen (MON) are solutions of dinitrogen trioxide (N_{2}O_{3}) in dinitrogen tetroxide/nitrogen dioxide (N_{2}O_{4} and NO_{2}). It may be used as an oxidizing agent in rocket propulsion systems.

Mixed oxides of nitrogen are produced by dissolving nitric oxide (NO) gas in liquid dinitrogen tetroxide. Nitric oxide reacts with nitrogen dioxide, present in dinitrogen tetroxide, to form dinitrogen trioxide. The resulting mixture is greenish blue, while dinitrogen tetroxide is colorless or brownish yellow. The Liquid phase of MON contains no nitric oxide.

N_{2}O_{4} ⇌ 2NO_{2}

NO_{2} + NO ⇌ N_{2}O_{3}

A broad range of compositions is available, and can be denoted as MONi, where i represents the percentage of nitric oxide in the mixture (for example, MON3 contains 3% nitric oxide, MON25 25% nitric oxide). An upper limit is MON40 (40% by weight). In Europe, MON1.3 is mostly used for rocket propulsion systems, and in the US, the standard is MON3. A higher percentage of NO decreases the corrosiveness of the liquid, but also decreases oxidation potential and increases costs.

The addition of nitric oxide also reduces the freezing point to a more desirable temperature. The freezing point of pure nitrogen tetroxide is −9 °C (16 °F), while MON3 is −15 °C (5 °F) and MON25 is −55 °C (−67 °F).
