= List of USA satellites (501-1000) =

This is a list of satellites and spacecraft which have been given USA designations by the United States Air Force. These designations have been applied to most United States military satellites since 1984, and replaced the earlier OPS designation.

As of April 2024, USA designations have been assigned to 544 space satellites. There is not always a one-to-one mapping between launch vehicles and mission spacecraft. This can occasionally result in gaps when maintaining records that incorrectly make that assumption, such as the "missing" entries for USA-163 (which are, symmetrically, contemporary with confusion over "splitting" spacecraft tracks).

== List ==
Number	Launch date	COSPAR-ID	Function	Launch vehicle	Other designations	Status	Remarks
USA-501	2025-04-12	2025-074C	Reconnaissance	Falcon 9 Block 5	NROL-192	Active	Starshield constellation, launched with USA-499 to USA-520.
USA-502	2025-04-12	2025-074D	Reconnaissance	Falcon 9 Block 5	NROL-192	Active	Starshield constellation, launched with USA-499 to USA-520.
USA-503	2025-04-12	2025-074E	Reconnaissance	Falcon 9 Block 5	NROL-192	Active	Starshield constellation, launched with USA-499 to USA-520.
USA-504	2025-04-12	2025-074F	Reconnaissance	Falcon 9 Block 5	NROL-192	Active	Starshield constellation, launched with USA-499 to USA-520.
USA-505	2025-04-12	2025-074G	Reconnaissance	Falcon 9 Block 5	NROL-192	Active	Starshield constellation, launched with USA-499 to USA-520.
USA-506	2025-04-12	2025-074H	Reconnaissance	Falcon 9 Block 5	NROL-192	Active	Starshield constellation, launched with USA-499 to USA-520.
USA-507	2025-04-12	2025-074I	Reconnaissance	Falcon 9 Block 5	NROL-192	Active	Starshield constellation, launched with USA-499 to USA-520.
USA-508	2025-04-12	2025-074J	Reconnaissance	Falcon 9 Block 5	NROL-192	Active	Starshield constellation, launched with USA-499 to USA-520.
USA-509	2025-04-12	2025-074K	Reconnaissance	Falcon 9 Block 5	NROL-192	Active	Starshield constellation, launched with USA-499 to USA-520.
USA-510	2025-04-12	2025-074L	Reconnaissance	Falcon 9 Block 5	NROL-192	Active	Starshield constellation, launched with USA-499 to USA-520.
USA-511	2025-04-12	2025-074M	Reconnaissance	Falcon 9 Block 5	NROL-192	Active	Starshield constellation, launched with USA-499 to USA-520.
USA-512	2025-04-12	2025-074N	Reconnaissance	Falcon 9 Block 5	NROL-192	Active	Starshield constellation, launched with USA-499 to USA-520.
USA-513	2025-04-12	2025-074O	Reconnaissance	Falcon 9 Block 5	NROL-192	Active	Starshield constellation, launched with USA-499 to USA-520.
USA-514	2025-04-12	2025-074P	Reconnaissance	Falcon 9 Block 5	NROL-192	Active	Starshield constellation, launched with USA-499 to USA-520.
USA-515	2025-04-12	2025-074Q	Reconnaissance	Falcon 9 Block 5	NROL-192	Active	Starshield constellation, launched with USA-499 to USA-520.
USA-516	2025-04-12	2025-074R	Reconnaissance	Falcon 9 Block 5	NROL-192	Active	Starshield constellation, launched with USA-499 to USA-520.
USA-517	2025-04-12	2025-074S	Reconnaissance	Falcon 9 Block 5	NROL-192	Active	Starshield constellation, launched with USA-499 to USA-520.
USA-518	2025-04-12	2025-074T	Reconnaissance	Falcon 9 Block 5	NROL-192	Active	Starshield constellation, launched with USA-499 to USA-520.
USA-519	2025-04-12	2025-074U	Reconnaissance	Falcon 9 Block 5	NROL-192	Active	Starshield constellation, launched with USA-499 to USA-520.
USA-520	2025-04-12	2025-074V	Reconnaissance	Falcon 9 Block 5	NROL-192	Active	Starshield constellation, launched with USA-499 to USA-520.
USA-521	2025-04-16	2025-077A	Reconnaissance	Minotaur IV / Orion 38	NROL-174	Active	
USA-522	2025-04-16	2025-077B	Reconnaissance	Minotaur IV / Orion 38	NROL-174	Active	
USA-523	2025-04-19	2025-079A	Reconnaissance	Falcon 9 Block 5	NROL-145	Active	Starshield constellation, launched with USA-423 to USA-544.
USA-524	2025-04-19	2025-079B	Reconnaissance	Falcon 9 Block 5	NROL-145	Active	Starshield constellation, launched with USA-423 to USA-544.
USA-525	2025-04-19	2025-079C	Reconnaissance	Falcon 9 Block 5	NROL-145	Active	Starshield constellation, launched with USA-423 to USA-544.
USA-526	2025-04-19	2025-079D	Reconnaissance	Falcon 9 Block 5	NROL-145	Active	Starshield constellation, launched with USA-423 to USA-544.
USA-527	2025-04-19	2025-079E	Reconnaissance	Falcon 9 Block 5	NROL-145	Active	Starshield constellation, launched with USA-423 to USA-544.
USA-528	2025-04-19	2025-079F	Reconnaissance	Falcon 9 Block 5	NROL-145	Active	Starshield constellation, launched with USA-423 to USA-544.
USA-529	2025-04-19	2025-079G	Reconnaissance	Falcon 9 Block 5	NROL-145	Active	Starshield constellation, launched with USA-423 to USA-544.
USA-530	2025-04-19	2025-079H	Reconnaissance	Falcon 9 Block 5	NROL-145	Active	Starshield constellation, launched with USA-423 to USA-544.
USA-531	2025-04-19	2025-079I	Reconnaissance	Falcon 9 Block 5	NROL-145	Active	Starshield constellation, launched with USA-423 to USA-544.
USA-532	2025-04-19	2025-079J	Reconnaissance	Falcon 9 Block 5	NROL-145	Active	Starshield constellation, launched with USA-423 to USA-544.
USA-533	2025-04-19	2025-079K	Reconnaissance	Falcon 9 Block 5	NROL-145	Active	Starshield constellation, launched with USA-423 to USA-544.
USA-534	2025-04-19	2025-079L	Reconnaissance	Falcon 9 Block 5	NROL-145	Active	Starshield constellation, launched with USA-423 to USA-544.
USA-535	2025-04-19	2025-079M	Reconnaissance	Falcon 9 Block 5	NROL-145	Active	Starshield constellation, launched with USA-423 to USA-544.
USA-536	2025-04-19	2025-079N	Reconnaissance	Falcon 9 Block 5	NROL-145	Active	Starshield constellation, launched with USA-423 to USA-544.
USA-537	2025-04-19	2025-079O	Reconnaissance	Falcon 9 Block 5	NROL-145	Active	Starshield constellation, launched with USA-423 to USA-544.
USA-538	2025-04-19	2025-079P	Reconnaissance	Falcon 9 Block 5	NROL-145	Active	Starshield constellation, launched with USA-423 to USA-544.
USA-539	2025-04-19	2025-079Q	Reconnaissance	Falcon 9 Block 5	NROL-145	Active	Starshield constellation, launched with USA-423 to USA-544.
USA-540	2025-04-19	2025-079R	Reconnaissance	Falcon 9 Block 5	NROL-145	Active	Starshield constellation, launched with USA-423 to USA-544.
USA-541	2025-04-19	2025-079S	Reconnaissance	Falcon 9 Block 5	NROL-145	Active	Starshield constellation, launched with USA-423 to USA-544.
USA-542	2025-04-19	2025-079T	Reconnaissance	Falcon 9 Block 5	NROL-145	Active	Starshield constellation, launched with USA-423 to USA-544.
USA-543	2025-04-19	2025-079U	Reconnaissance	Falcon 9 Block 5	NROL-145	Active	Starshield constellation, launched with USA-423 to USA-544.
USA-544	2025-04-19	2025-079V	Reconnaissance	Falcon 9 Block 5	NROL-145	Active	Starshield constellation, launched with USA-423 to USA-544.
USA-545	2025-05-30	2025-116A	Navigation	Falcon 9 Block 5	GPS III-08 Katherine Johnson	Active	
USA-546	2025-05-xx	2022-144L	TBA	Falcon Heavy	USSF-44	Active	Released from LDPE-2 space tug.
USA-547	2025-05-xx	2022-144M	TBA	Falcon Heavy	USSF-44	Active	Released from LDPE-2 space tug.
USA-548	2025-05-xx	2022-144N	TBA	Falcon Heavy	USSF-44	Active	Released from LDPE-2 space tug.
USA-549	2025-07-31	2025-165T	Reconnaissance	Falcon 9 Block 5		Active	Starshield constellation, launched with Starlink 13-4 mission and USA-550.
USA-550	2025-07-31	2025-165U	Reconnaissance	Falcon 9 Block 5		Active	Starshield constellation, launched with Starlink 13-4 mission and USA-550.
USA-551	2025-08-xx	2022-144P	TBA	Falcon Heavy	USSF-44	Active	Released from LDPE-2 space tug.
USA-552	2025-08-xx	2022-144Q	TBA	Falcon Heavy	USSF-44	Active	Released from LDPE-2 space tug.
USA-553	2025-08-xx	2022-144R	TBA	Falcon Heavy	USSF-44	Active	Released from LDPE-2 space tug.
USA-554	2025-08-13	2025-173B	TBA	Vulcan Centaur VC4S	USSF-106	Active	
USA-555	2025-08-22	2025-183A	TBA	Falcon 9 Block 5	USSF-36 (OTV-8)	Active	Boeing X-37B, payload includes quantum inertial sensor
USA-556		2022-144S	TBA	Falcon Heavy	USSF-44	Active	Released from LDPE-2 space tug.
USA-557		2022-144T	TBA	Falcon Heavy	USSF-44	Active	Released from LDPE-2 space tug.
USA-558	2025-09-22	2025-213A	Reconnaissance	Falcon 9 Block 5	NROL-48	Active	Starshield constellation, launched with USA-558 to USA-565.
USA-559	2025-09-22	2025-213B	Reconnaissance	Falcon 9 Block 5	NROL-48	Active	Starshield constellation, launched with USA-558 to USA-565.
USA-560	2025-09-22	2025-213C	Reconnaissance	Falcon 9 Block 5	NROL-48	Active	Starshield constellation, launched with USA-558 to USA-565.
USA-561	2025-09-22	2025-213D	Reconnaissance	Falcon 9 Block 5	NROL-48	Active	Starshield constellation, launched with USA-558 to USA-565.
USA-562	2025-09-22	2025-213E	Reconnaissance	Falcon 9 Block 5	NROL-48	Active	Starshield constellation, launched with USA-558 to USA-565.
USA-563	2025-09-22	2025-213F	Reconnaissance	Falcon 9 Block 5	NROL-48	Active	Starshield constellation, launched with USA-558 to USA-565.
USA-564	2025-09-22	2025-213G	Reconnaissance	Falcon 9 Block 5	NROL-48	Active	Starshield constellation, launched with USA-558 to USA-565.
USA-565	2025-09-22	2025-213H	Reconnaissance	Falcon 9 Block 5	NROL-48	Active	Starshield constellation, launched with USA-558 to USA-565.
USA-566		2024-134H	TBA	Atlas V 551	USSF-51	Active	
USA-567		2024-134J	TBA	Atlas V 551	USSF-51	Active	
USA-568			TBA	Atlas V 551	USSF-51	Active	
USA-569		2024-134L	TBA	Atlas V 551	USSF-51	Active	
USA-570	2025-12-09	2025-291A	TBA	Falcon 9 Block 5	NROL-77	Active	
USA-571	2025-08-13	2025-173E	TBA	Vulcan Centaur VC4S	USSF-106	Released from USSF-106.	
USA-572	2026-01-17	2026-11A	Reconnaissance	Falcon 9 Block 5	NROL-105	Active	Starshield constellation, launched with USA-572 to USA-580.
USA-573	2026-01-17	2026-11B	Reconnaissance	Falcon 9 Block 5	NROL-105	Active	Starshield constellation, launched with USA-572 to USA-580.
USA-574	2026-01-17	2026-11C	Reconnaissance	Falcon 9 Block 5	NROL-105	Active	Starshield constellation, launched with USA-572 to USA-580.
USA-575	2026-01-17	2026-11D	Reconnaissance	Falcon 9 Block 5	NROL-105	Active	Starshield constellation, launched with USA-572 to USA-580.
USA-576	2026-01-17	2026-11E	Reconnaissance	Falcon 9 Block 5	NROL-105	Active	Starshield constellation, launched with USA-572 to USA-580.
USA-577	2026-01-17	2026-11F	Reconnaissance	Falcon 9 Block 5	NROL-105	Active	Starshield constellation, launched with USA-572 to USA-580.
USA-578	2026-01-17	2026-11G	Reconnaissance	Falcon 9 Block 5	NROL-105	Active	Starshield constellation, launched with USA-572 to USA-580.
USA-579	2026-01-17	2026-11H	Reconnaissance	Falcon 9 Block 5	NROL-105	Active	Starshield constellation, launched with USA-572 to USA-580.
USA-580	2026-01-17	2026-11I	Reconnaissance	Falcon 9 Block 5	NROL-105	Active	Starshield constellation, launched with USA-572 to USA-580.
USA-581	2026-01-28		Navigation	Falcon 9 Block 5	GPS-III 09 Ellison Onizuka	Active	
USA-582	2026-02-12		Space surveillance	Vulcan Centaur VC4S	GSSAP-7 (Hornet-7)	Active	
USA-583	2026-02-12		Space surveillance	Vulcan Centaur VC4S	GSSAP-8 (Hornet-8)	Active	
USA-584	2026-02-12		TBA	Vulcan Centaur VC4S	USSF-87	Active	
USA-585	2026-04-21	2026-87A	Navigation	Falcon 9 Block 5	GPS III-10 Hedy Lamarr	Active	
USA-586	2026-05-12	2026-103A	Reconnaissance	Falcon 9 Block 5	NROL-172	Active	Starshield constellation, launched with USA-586 to USA-607.
USA-587	2026-05-12	2026-103B	Reconnaissance	Falcon 9 Block 5	NROL-172	Active	Starshield constellation, launched with USA-586 to USA-607.
USA-588	2026-05-12	2026-103C	Reconnaissance	Falcon 9 Block 5	NROL-172	Active	Starshield constellation, launched with USA-586 to USA-607.
USA-589	2026-05-12	2026-103D	Reconnaissance	Falcon 9 Block 5	NROL-172	Active	Starshield constellation, launched with USA-586 to USA-607.
USA-590	2026-05-12	2026-103E	Reconnaissance	Falcon 9 Block 5	NROL-172	Active	Starshield constellation, launched with USA-586 to USA-607.
USA-591	2026-05-12	2026-103F	Reconnaissance	Falcon 9 Block 5	NROL-172	Active	Starshield constellation, launched with USA-586 to USA-607.
USA-592	2026-05-12	2026-103G	Reconnaissance	Falcon 9 Block 5	NROL-172	Active	Starshield constellation, launched with USA-586 to USA-607.
USA-593	2026-05-12	2026-103H	Reconnaissance	Falcon 9 Block 5	NROL-172	Active	Starshield constellation, launched with USA-586 to USA-607.
USA-594	2026-05-12	2026-103I	Reconnaissance	Falcon 9 Block 5	NROL-172	Active	Starshield constellation, launched with USA-586 to USA-607.
USA-595	2026-05-12	2026-103J	Reconnaissance	Falcon 9 Block 5	NROL-172	Active	Starshield constellation, launched with USA-586 to USA-607.
USA-596	2026-05-12	2026-103K	Reconnaissance	Falcon 9 Block 5	NROL-172	Active	Starshield constellation, launched with USA-586 to USA-607.
USA-597	2026-05-12	2026-103L	Reconnaissance	Falcon 9 Block 5	NROL-172	Active	Starshield constellation, launched with USA-586 to USA-607.
USA-598	2026-05-12	2026-103M	Reconnaissance	Falcon 9 Block 5	NROL-172	Active	Starshield constellation, launched with USA-586 to USA-607.
USA-599	2026-05-12	2026-103N	Reconnaissance	Falcon 9 Block 5	NROL-172	Active	Starshield constellation, launched with USA-586 to USA-607.
USA-600	2026-05-12	2026-103O	Reconnaissance	Falcon 9 Block 5	NROL-172	Active	Starshield constellation, launched with USA-586 to USA-607.
USA-601	2026-05-12	2026-103P	Reconnaissance	Falcon 9 Block 5	NROL-172	Active	Starshield constellation, launched with USA-586 to USA-607.
USA-602	2026-05-12	2026-103Q	Reconnaissance	Falcon 9 Block 5	NROL-172	Active	Starshield constellation, launched with USA-586 to USA-607.
USA-603	2026-05-12	2026-103R	Reconnaissance	Falcon 9 Block 5	NROL-172	Active	Starshield constellation, launched with USA-586 to USA-607.
USA-604	2026-05-12	2026-103S	Reconnaissance	Falcon 9 Block 5	NROL-172	Active	Starshield constellation, launched with USA-586 to USA-607.
USA-605	2026-05-12	2026-103T	Reconnaissance	Falcon 9 Block 5	NROL-172	Active	Starshield constellation, launched with USA-586 to USA-607.
USA-606	2026-05-12	2026-103U	Reconnaissance	Falcon 9 Block 5	NROL-172	Active	Starshield constellation, launched with USA-586 to USA-607.
USA-607	2026-05-12	2026-103V	Reconnaissance	Falcon 9 Block 5	NROL-172	Active	Starshield constellation, launched with USA-586 to USA-607.
USA-608	2025-06-07	2025-126A	Reconnaissance	Falcon 9 Block 5		Active	Starshield constellation, launched with Starlink 17-43 mission and USA-608 to USA-609.
USA-609	2026-06-07	2026-126B	Reconnaissance	Falcon 9 Block 5		Active	Starshield constellation, launched with Starlink 17-43 mission and USA-608 to USA-609.
USA-610	2026-06-19	2026-141A	Reconnaissance	Falcon 9 Block 5		Active	Starshield constellation, launched with USA-610 to USA-618.
USA-611	2026-06-19	2026-141B	Reconnaissance	Falcon 9 Block 5		Active	Starshield constellation, launched with USA-610 to USA-618.
USA-612	2026-06-19	2026-141C	Reconnaissance	Falcon 9 Block 5		Active	Starshield constellation, launched with USA-610 to USA-618.
USA-613	2026-06-19	2026-141D	Reconnaissance	Falcon 9 Block 5		Active	Starshield constellation, launched with USA-610 to USA-618.
USA-614	2026-06-19	2026-141E	Reconnaissance	Falcon 9 Block 5		Active	Starshield constellation, launched with USA-610 to USA-618.
USA-615	2026-06-19	2026-141F	Reconnaissance	Falcon 9 Block 5		Active	Starshield constellation, launched with USA-610 to USA-618.
USA-616	2026-06-19	2026-141G	Reconnaissance	Falcon 9 Block 5		Active	Starshield constellation, launched with USA-610 to USA-618.
USA-617	2026-06-19	2026-141H	Reconnaissance	Falcon 9 Block 5		Active	Starshield constellation, launched with USA-610 to USA-618.
USA-618	2026-06-19	2026-141I	Reconnaissance	Falcon 9 Block 5		Active	Starshield constellation, launched with USA-610 to USA-618.
USA-619	2026-07-30	2026-174A	SIGINT	Falcon 9 Block 5	NROL-95 (Intruder-F/O 4/NOSS-4 4)	Active	
USA-620	2026-08-16	2026-186A	Reconnaissance	Falcon 9 Block 5	USSF-366 (SBST R-1)	Active	Starshield constellation codenamed USSF-366, launched with USA-620 to USA-642.
USA-621	2026-08-16	2026-186B	Reconnaissance	Falcon 9 Block 5	USSF-366 (SBST R-1)	Active	Starshield constellation codenamed USSF-366, launched with USA-620 to USA-642.
USA-622	2026-08-16	2026-186C	Reconnaissance	Falcon 9 Block 5	USSF-366 (SBST R-1)	Active	Starshield constellation codenamed USSF-366, launched with USA-620 to USA-642.
USA-623	2026-08-16	2026-186D	Reconnaissance	Falcon 9 Block 5	USSF-366 (SBST R-1)	Active	Starshield constellation codenamed USSF-366, launched with USA-620 to USA-642.
USA-624	2026-08-16	2026-186E	Reconnaissance	Falcon 9 Block 5	USSF-366 (SBST R-1)	Active	Starshield constellation codenamed USSF-366, launched with USA-620 to USA-642.
USA-625	2026-08-16	2026-186F	Reconnaissance	Falcon 9 Block 5	USSF-366 (SBST R-1)	Active	Starshield constellation codenamed USSF-366, launched with USA-620 to USA-642.
USA-626	2026-08-16	2026-186G	Reconnaissance	Falcon 9 Block 5	USSF-366 (SBST R-1)	Active	Starshield constellation codenamed USSF-366, launched with USA-620 to USA-642.
USA-627	2026-08-16	2026-186H	Reconnaissance	Falcon 9 Block 5	USSF-366 (SBST R-1)	Active	Starshield constellation codenamed USSF-366, launched with USA-620 to USA-642.
USA-628	2026-08-16	2026-186I	Reconnaissance	Falcon 9 Block 5	USSF-366 (SBST R-1)	Active	Starshield constellation codenamed USSF-366, launched with USA-620 to USA-642.
USA-629	2026-08-16	2026-186J	Reconnaissance	Falcon 9 Block 5	USSF-366 (SBST R-1)	Active	Starshield constellation codenamed USSF-366, launched with USA-620 to USA-642.
USA-630	2026-08-16	2026-186K	Reconnaissance	Falcon 9 Block 5	USSF-366 (SBST R-1)	Active	Starshield constellation codenamed USSF-366, launched with USA-620 to USA-642.
USA-631	2026-08-16	2026-186L	Reconnaissance	Falcon 9 Block 5	USSF-366 (SBST R-1)	Active	Starshield constellation codenamed USSF-366, launched with USA-620 to USA-642.
USA-632	2026-08-16	2026-186M	Reconnaissance	Falcon 9 Block 5	USSF-366 (SBST R-1)	Active	Starshield constellation codenamed USSF-366, launched with USA-620 to USA-642.
USA-633	2026-08-16	2026-186N	Reconnaissance	Falcon 9 Block 5	USSF-366 (SBST R-1)	Active	Starshield constellation codenamed USSF-366, launched with USA-620 to USA-642.
USA-634	2026-08-16	2026-186O	Reconnaissance	Falcon 9 Block 5	USSF-366 (SBST R-1)	Active	Starshield constellation codenamed USSF-366, launched with USA-620 to USA-642.
USA-635	2026-08-16	2026-186P	Reconnaissance	Falcon 9 Block 5	USSF-366 (SBST R-1)	Active	Starshield constellation codenamed USSF-366, launched with USA-620 to USA-642.
USA-636	2026-08-16	2026-186Q	Reconnaissance	Falcon 9 Block 5	USSF-366 (SBST R-1)	Active	Starshield constellation codenamed USSF-366, launched with USA-620 to USA-642.
USA-637	2026-08-16	2026-186Q	Reconnaissance	Falcon 9 Block 5	USSF-366 (SBST R-1)	Active	Starshield constellation codenamed USSF-366, launched with USA-620 to USA-642.
USA-638	2026-08-16	2026-186R	Reconnaissance	Falcon 9 Block 5	USSF-366 (SBST R-1)	Active	Starshield constellation codenamed USSF-366, launched with USA-620 to USA-642.
USA-639	2026-08-16	2026-186S	Reconnaissance	Falcon 9 Block 5	USSF-366 (SBST R-1)	Active	Starshield constellation codenamed USSF-366, launched with USA-620 to USA-642.
USA-640	2026-08-16	2026-186T	Reconnaissance	Falcon 9 Block 5	USSF-366 (SBST R-1)	Active	Starshield constellation codenamed USSF-366, launched with USA-620 to USA-642.
USA-641	2026-08-16	2026-186U	Reconnaissance	Falcon 9 Block 5	USSF-366 (SBST R-1)	Active	Starshield constellation codenamed USSF-366, launched with USA-620 to USA-642.
USA-642	2026-08-16	2026-186V	Reconnaissance	Falcon 9 Block 5	USSF-366 (SBST R-1)	Active	Starshield constellation codenamed USSF-366, launched with USA-620 to USA-642.
USA-643	2026-02-12	2026-029F	TBA	Vulcan Centaur VC4S		Active	Released from USSF-106
USA-644	2026-09-10	2026-206A	Reconnaissance	Falcon 9 Block 5	USSF-153 (SBST R-2)	Active	Starshield constellation codenamed USSF-153, launched with USA-644 to USA-666.
USA-645	2026-09-10	2026-206B	Reconnaissance	Falcon 9 Block 5	USSF-153 (SBST R-2)	Active	Starshield constellation codenamed USSF-153, launched with USA-644 to USA-666.
USA-646	2026-09-10	2026-206C	Reconnaissance	Falcon 9 Block 5	USSF-153 (SBST R-2)	Active	Starshield constellation codenamed USSF-153, launched with USA-644 to USA-666.
USA-647	2026-09-10	2026-206D	Reconnaissance	Falcon 9 Block 5	USSF-153 (SBST R-2)	Active	Starshield constellation codenamed USSF-153, launched with USA-644 to USA-666.
USA-648	2026-09-10	2026-206E	Reconnaissance	Falcon 9 Block 5	USSF-153 (SBST R-2)	Active	Starshield constellation codenamed USSF-153, launched with USA-644 to USA-666.
USA-649	2026-09-10	2026-206F	Reconnaissance	Falcon 9 Block 5	USSF-153 (SBST R-2)	Active	Starshield constellation codenamed USSF-153, launched with USA-644 to USA-666.
USA-650	2026-09-10	2026-206G	Reconnaissance	Falcon 9 Block 5	USSF-153 (SBST R-2)	Active	Starshield constellation codenamed USSF-153, launched with USA-644 to USA-666.
USA-651	2026-09-10	2026-206H	Reconnaissance	Falcon 9 Block 5	USSF-153 (SBST R-2)	Active	Starshield constellation codenamed USSF-153, launched with USA-644 to USA-666.
USA-652	2026-09-10	2026-206I	Reconnaissance	Falcon 9 Block 5	USSF-153 (SBST R-2)	Active	Starshield constellation codenamed USSF-153, launched with USA-644 to USA-666.
USA-653	2026-09-10	2026-206J	Reconnaissance	Falcon 9 Block 5	USSF-153 (SBST R-2)	Active	Starshield constellation codenamed USSF-153, launched with USA-644 to USA-666.
USA-654	2026-09-10	2026-206K	Reconnaissance	Falcon 9 Block 5	USSF-153 (SBST R-2)	Active	Starshield constellation codenamed USSF-153, launched with USA-644 to USA-666.
USA-655	2026-09-10	2026-206L	Reconnaissance	Falcon 9 Block 5	USSF-153 (SBST R-2)	Active	Starshield constellation codenamed USSF-153, launched with USA-644 to USA-666.
USA-656	2026-09-10	2026-206M	Reconnaissance	Falcon 9 Block 5	USSF-153 (SBST R-2)	Active	Starshield constellation codenamed USSF-153, launched with USA-644 to USA-666.
USA-657	2026-09-10	2026-206N	Reconnaissance	Falcon 9 Block 5	USSF-153 (SBST R-2)	Active	Starshield constellation codenamed USSF-153, launched with USA-644 to USA-666.
USA-658	2026-09-10	2026-206O	Reconnaissance	Falcon 9 Block 5	USSF-153 (SBST R-2)	Active	Starshield constellation codenamed USSF-153, launched with USA-644 to USA-666.
USA-659	2026-09-10	2026-206P	Reconnaissance	Falcon 9 Block 5	USSF-153 (SBST R-2)	Active	Starshield constellation codenamed USSF-153, launched with USA-644 to USA-666.
USA-660	2026-09-10	2026-206Q	Reconnaissance	Falcon 9 Block 5	USSF-153 (SBST R-2)	Active	Starshield constellation codenamed USSF-153, launched with USA-644 to USA-666.
USA-661	2026-09-10	2026-206Q	Reconnaissance	Falcon 9 Block 5	USSF-153 (SBST R-2)	Active	Starshield constellation codenamed USSF-153, launched with USA-644 to USA-666.
USA-662	2026-09-10	2026-206R	Reconnaissance	Falcon 9 Block 5	USSF-153 (SBST R-2)	Active	Starshield constellation codenamed USSF-153, launched with USA-644 to USA-666.
USA-663	2026-09-10	2026-206S	Reconnaissance	Falcon 9 Block 5	USSF-153 (SBST R-2)	Active	Starshield constellation codenamed USSF-153, launched with USA-644 to USA-666.
USA-664	2026-09-10	2026-206T	Reconnaissance	Falcon 9 Block 5	USSF-153 (SBST R-2)	Active	Starshield constellation codenamed USSF-153, launched with USA-644 to USA-666.
USA-665	2026-09-10	2026-206U	Reconnaissance	Falcon 9 Block 5	USSF-153 (SBST R-2)	Active	Starshield constellation codenamed USSF-153, launched with USA-644 to USA-666.
USA-666	2026-09-10	2026-206V	Reconnaissance	Falcon 9 Block 5	USSF-153 (SBST R-2)	Active	Starshield constellation codenamed USSF-153, launched with USA-644 to USA-666.
USA-667	2024-07-30	2024-134M	TBA	Atlas V 551		Active	Released from USSF-51.
USA-668	2026-09-17	2026-214A	Radar Imaging	Falcon 9 Block 5	USSF-259 (SBST TH-1)	Active	Starshield constellation codenamed USSF-259, launched with USA-668 to USA-684.
USA-669	2026-09-17	2026-214B	Radar Imaging	Falcon 9 Block 5	USSF-259 (SBST TH-1)	Active	Starshield constellation codenamed USSF-259, launched with USA-668 to USA-684.
USA-670	2026-09-17	2026-214C	Radar Imaging	Falcon 9 Block 5	USSF-259 (SBST TH-1)	Active	Starshield constellation codenamed USSF-259, launched with USA-668 to USA-684.
USA-671	2026-09-17	2026-214D	Radar Imaging	Falcon 9 Block 5	USSF-259 (SBST TH-1)	Active	Starshield constellation codenamed USSF-259, launched with USA-668 to USA-684.
USA-672	2026-09-17	2026-214E	Radar Imaging	Falcon 9 Block 5	USSF-259 (SBST TH-1)	Active	Starshield constellation codenamed USSF-259, launched with USA-668 to USA-684.
USA-673	2026-09-17	2026-214F	Radar Imaging	Falcon 9 Block 5	USSF-259 (SBST TH-1)	Active	Starshield constellation codenamed USSF-259, launched with USA-668 to USA-684.
USA-674	2026-09-17	2026-214G	Radar Imaging	Falcon 9 Block 5	USSF-259 (SBST TH-1)	Active	Starshield constellation codenamed USSF-259, launched with USA-668 to USA-684.
USA-675	2026-09-17	2026-214H	Radar Imaging	Falcon 9 Block 5	USSF-259 (SBST TH-1)	Active	Starshield constellation codenamed USSF-259, launched with USA-668 to USA-684.
USA-676	2026-09-17	2026-214I	Radar Imaging	Falcon 9 Block 5	USSF-259 (SBST TH-1)	Active	Starshield constellation codenamed USSF-259, launched with USA-668 to USA-684.
USA-677	2026-09-17	2026-214J	Radar Imaging	Falcon 9 Block 5	USSF-259 (SBST TH-1)	Active	Starshield constellation codenamed USSF-259, launched with USA-668 to USA-684.
USA-678	2026-09-17	2026-214K	Radar Imaging	Falcon 9 Block 5	USSF-259 (SBST TH-1)	Active	Starshield constellation codenamed USSF-259, launched with USA-668 to USA-684.
USA-679	2026-09-17	2026-214L	Radar Imaging	Falcon 9 Block 5	USSF-259 (SBST TH-1)	Active	Starshield constellation codenamed USSF-259, launched with USA-668 to USA-684.
USA-680	2026-09-17	2026-214M	Radar Imaging	Falcon 9 Block 5	USSF-259 (SBST TH-1)	Active	Starshield constellation codenamed USSF-259, launched with USA-668 to USA-684.
USA-681	2026-09-17	2026-214N	Radar Imaging	Falcon 9 Block 5	USSF-259 (SBST TH-1)	Active	Starshield constellation codenamed USSF-259, launched with USA-668 to USA-684.
USA-682	2026-09-17	2026-214O	Radar Imaging	Falcon 9 Block 5	USSF-259 (SBST TH-1)	Active	Starshield constellation codenamed USSF-259, launched with USA-668 to USA-684.
USA-683	2026-09-17	2026-214P	Radar Imaging	Falcon 9 Block 5	USSF-259 (SBST TH-1)	Active	Starshield constellation codenamed USSF-259, launched with USA-668 to USA-684.
USA-684	2026-09-17	2026-214Q	Radar Imaging	Falcon 9 Block 5	USSF-259 (SBST TH-1)	Active	Starshield constellation codenamed USSF-259, launched with USA-668 to USA-684.
USA-685	2026-09-26	2026-224A	Radar Imaging	Falcon 9 Block 5	USSF-385 (SBST R-3)	Active	Starshield constellation codenamed USSF-385, launched with USA-685 to USA-707.
USA-686	2026-09-26	2026-224B	Radar Imaging	Falcon 9 Block 5	USSF-385 (SBST R-3)	Active	Starshield constellation codenamed USSF-385, launched with USA-685 to USA-707.
USA-687	2026-09-26	2026-224C	Radar Imaging	Falcon 9 Block 5	USSF-385 (SBST R-3)	Active	Starshield constellation codenamed USSF-385, launched with USA-685 to USA-707.
USA-688	2026-09-26	2026-224D	Radar Imaging	Falcon 9 Block 5	USSF-385 (SBST R-3)	Active	Starshield constellation codenamed USSF-385, launched with USA-685 to USA-707.
USA-689	2026-09-26	2026-224E	Radar Imaging	Falcon 9 Block 5	USSF-385 (SBST R-3)	Active	Starshield constellation codenamed USSF-385, launched with USA-685 to USA-707.
USA-690	2026-09-26	2026-224F	Radar Imaging	Falcon 9 Block 5	USSF-385 (SBST R-3)	Active	Starshield constellation codenamed USSF-385, launched with USA-685 to USA-707.
USA-691	2026-09-26	2026-224G	Radar Imaging	Falcon 9 Block 5	USSF-385 (SBST R-3)	Active	Starshield constellation codenamed USSF-385, launched with USA-685 to USA-707.
USA-692	2026-09-26	2026-224H	Radar Imaging	Falcon 9 Block 5	USSF-385 (SBST R-3)	Active	Starshield constellation codenamed USSF-385, launched with USA-685 to USA-707.
USA-693	2026-09-26	2026-224I	Radar Imaging	Falcon 9 Block 5	USSF-385 (SBST R-3)	Active	Starshield constellation codenamed USSF-385, launched with USA-685 to USA-707.
USA-694	2026-09-26	2026-224J	Radar Imaging	Falcon 9 Block 5	USSF-385 (SBST R-3)	Active	Starshield constellation codenamed USSF-385, launched with USA-685 to USA-707.
USA-695	2026-09-26	2026-224K	Radar Imaging	Falcon 9 Block 5	USSF-385 (SBST R-3)	Active	Starshield constellation codenamed USSF-385, launched with USA-685 to USA-707.
USA-696	2026-09-26	2026-224L	Radar Imaging	Falcon 9 Block 5	USSF-385 (SBST R-3)	Active	Starshield constellation codenamed USSF-385, launched with USA-685 to USA-707.
USA-697	2026-09-26	2026-224M	Radar Imaging	Falcon 9 Block 5	USSF-385 (SBST R-3)	Active	Starshield constellation codenamed USSF-385, launched with USA-685 to USA-707.
USA-698	2026-09-26	2026-224N	Radar Imaging	Falcon 9 Block 5	USSF-385 (SBST R-3)	Active	Starshield constellation codenamed USSF-385, launched with USA-685 to USA-707.
USA-699	2026-09-26	2026-224O	Radar Imaging	Falcon 9 Block 5	USSF-385 (SBST R-3)	Active	Starshield constellation codenamed USSF-385, launched with USA-685 to USA-707.
USA-700	2026-09-26	2026-224P	Radar Imaging	Falcon 9 Block 5	USSF-385 (SBST R-3)	Active	Starshield constellation codenamed USSF-385, launched with USA-685 to USA-707.
USA-701	2026-09-26	2026-224Q	Radar Imaging	Falcon 9 Block 5	USSF-385 (SBST R-3)	Active	Starshield constellation codenamed USSF-385, launched with USA-685 to USA-707.
USA-702	2026-09-26	2026-224R	Radar Imaging	Falcon 9 Block 5	USSF-385 (SBST R-3)	Active	Starshield constellation codenamed USSF-385, launched with USA-685 to USA-707.
USA-703	2026-09-26	2026-224S	Radar Imaging	Falcon 9 Block 5	USSF-385 (SBST R-3)	Active	Starshield constellation codenamed USSF-385, launched with USA-685 to USA-707.
USA-704	2026-09-26	2026-224T	Radar Imaging	Falcon 9 Block 5	USSF-385 (SBST R-3)	Active	Starshield constellation codenamed USSF-385, launched with USA-685 to USA-707.
USA-705	2026-09-26	2026-224U	Radar Imaging	Falcon 9 Block 5	USSF-385 (SBST R-3)	Active	Starshield constellation codenamed USSF-385, launched with USA-685 to USA-707.
USA-706	2026-09-26	2026-224V	Radar Imaging	Falcon 9 Block 5	USSF-385 (SBST R-3)	Active	Starshield constellation codenamed USSF-385, launched with USA-685 to USA-707.
USA-707	2026-09-26	2026-224Q	Radar Imaging	Falcon 9 Block 5	USSF-385 (SBST R-3)	Active	Starshield constellation codenamed USSF-385, launched with USA-685 to USA-707.
USA-708	2026-10-02	2026-227A	SIGINT	Falcon Heavy	NROL-97	Active	
USA-709	2026-10-16	2026-235A	Radar Imaging	Falcon 9 Block 5	USSF-481 (SBST TH-1)	Active	Starshield constellation codenamed USSF-481, launched with USA-709 to USA-725.
USA-710	2026-10-16	2026-235B	Radar Imaging	Falcon 9 Block 5	USSF-481 (SBST TH-1)	Active	Starshield constellation codenamed USSF-481, launched with USA-709 to USA-725.
USA-711	2026-10-16	2026-235C	Radar Imaging	Falcon 9 Block 5	USSF-481 (SBST TH-1)	Active	Starshield constellation codenamed USSF-481, launched with USA-709 to USA-725.
USA-712	2026-10-16	2026-235D	Radar Imaging	Falcon 9 Block 5	USSF-481 (SBST TH-1)	Active	Starshield constellation codenamed USSF-481, launched with USA-709 to USA-725.
USA-713	2026-10-16	2026-235E	Radar Imaging	Falcon 9 Block 5	USSF-481 (SBST TH-1)	Active	Starshield constellation codenamed USSF-481, launched with USA-709 to USA-725.
USA-714	2026-10-16	2026-235F	Radar Imaging	Falcon 9 Block 5	USSF-481 (SBST TH-1)	Active	Starshield constellation codenamed USSF-481, launched with USA-709 to USA-725.
USA-715	2026-10-16	2026-235G	Radar Imaging	Falcon 9 Block 5	USSF-481 (SBST TH-1)	Active	Starshield constellation codenamed USSF-481, launched with USA-709 to USA-725.
USA-716	2026-10-16	2026-235H	Radar Imaging	Falcon 9 Block 5	USSF-481 (SBST TH-1)	Active	Starshield constellation codenamed USSF-481, launched with USA-709 to USA-725.
USA-717	2026-10-16	2026-235I	Radar Imaging	Falcon 9 Block 5	USSF-481 (SBST TH-1)	Active	Starshield constellation codenamed USSF-481, launched with USA-709 to USA-725.
USA-718	2026-10-16	2026-235J	Radar Imaging	Falcon 9 Block 5	USSF-481 (SBST TH-1)	Active	Starshield constellation codenamed USSF-481, launched with USA-709 to USA-725.
USA-719	2026-10-16	2026-235K	Radar Imaging	Falcon 9 Block 5	USSF-481 (SBST TH-1)	Active	Starshield constellation codenamed USSF-481, launched with USA-709 to USA-725.
USA-720	2026-10-16	2026-235L	Radar Imaging	Falcon 9 Block 5	USSF-481 (SBST TH-1)	Active	Starshield constellation codenamed USSF-481, launched with USA-709 to USA-725.
USA-721	2026-10-16	2026-235M	Radar Imaging	Falcon 9 Block 5	USSF-481 (SBST TH-1)	Active	Starshield constellation codenamed USSF-481, launched with USA-709 to USA-725.
USA-722	2026-10-16	2026-235N	Radar Imaging	Falcon 9 Block 5	USSF-481 (SBST TH-1)	Active	Starshield constellation codenamed USSF-481, launched with USA-709 to USA-725.
USA-723	2026-10-16	2026-235O	Radar Imaging	Falcon 9 Block 5	USSF-481 (SBST TH-1)	Active	Starshield constellation codenamed USSF-481, launched with USA-709 to USA-725.
USA-724	2026-10-16	2026-235P	Radar Imaging	Falcon 9 Block 5	USSF-481 (SBST TH-1)	Active	Starshield constellation codenamed USSF-481, launched with USA-709 to USA-725.
USA-725	2026-10-16	2026-235Q	Radar Imaging	Falcon 9 Block 5	USSF-481 (SBST TH-1)	Active	Starshield constellation codenamed USSF-481, launched with USA-709 to USA-725.
USA-726	2026-11-07	2026-251A	Radar Imaging	Falcon 9 Block 5	USSF-432 (SBST R-4)	Active	Starshield constellation codenamed USSF-432, launched with USA-726 to USA-748.
USA-727	2026-11-07	2026-251B	Radar Imaging	Falcon 9 Block 5	USSF-432 (SBST R-4)	Active	Starshield constellation codenamed USSF-432, launched with USA-726 to USA-748.
USA-728	2026-11-07	2026-251C	Radar Imaging	Falcon 9 Block 5	USSF-432 (SBST R-4)	Active	Starshield constellation codenamed USSF-432, launched with USA-726 to USA-748.
USA-729	2026-11-07	2026-251D	Radar Imaging	Falcon 9 Block 5	USSF-432 (SBST R-4)	Active	Starshield constellation codenamed USSF-432, launched with USA-726 to USA-748.
USA-730	2026-11-07	2026-251E	Radar Imaging	Falcon 9 Block 5	USSF-432 (SBST R-4)	Active	Starshield constellation codenamed USSF-432, launched with USA-726 to USA-748.
USA-731	2026-11-07	2026-251F	Radar Imaging	Falcon 9 Block 5	USSF-432 (SBST R-4)	Active	Starshield constellation codenamed USSF-432, launched with USA-726 to USA-748.
USA-732	2026-11-07	2026-251G	Radar Imaging	Falcon 9 Block 5	USSF-432 (SBST R-4)	Active	Starshield constellation codenamed USSF-432, launched with USA-726 to USA-748.
USA-733	2026-11-07	2026-251H	Radar Imaging	Falcon 9 Block 5	USSF-432 (SBST R-4)	Active	Starshield constellation codenamed USSF-432, launched with USA-726 to USA-748.
USA-734	2026-11-07	2026-251I	Radar Imaging	Falcon 9 Block 5	USSF-432 (SBST R-4)	Active	Starshield constellation codenamed USSF-432, launched with USA-726 to USA-748.
USA-735	2026-11-07	2026-251J	Radar Imaging	Falcon 9 Block 5	USSF-432 (SBST R-4)	Active	Starshield constellation codenamed USSF-432, launched with USA-726 to USA-748.
USA-736	2026-11-07	2026-251K	Radar Imaging	Falcon 9 Block 5	USSF-432 (SBST R-4)	Active	Starshield constellation codenamed USSF-432, launched with USA-726 to USA-748.
USA-737	2026-11-07	2026-251L	Radar Imaging	Falcon 9 Block 5	USSF-432 (SBST R-4)	Active	Starshield constellation codenamed USSF-432, launched with USA-726 to USA-748.
USA-738	2026-11-07	2026-251M	Radar Imaging	Falcon 9 Block 5	USSF-432 (SBST R-4)	Active	Starshield constellation codenamed USSF-432, launched with USA-726 to USA-748.
USA-739	2026-11-07	2026-251N	Radar Imaging	Falcon 9 Block 5	USSF-432 (SBST R-4)	Active	Starshield constellation codenamed USSF-432, launched with USA-726 to USA-748.
USA-740	2026-11-07	2026-251O	Radar Imaging	Falcon 9 Block 5	USSF-432 (SBST R-4)	Active	Starshield constellation codenamed USSF-432, launched with USA-726 to USA-748.
USA-741	2026-11-07	2026-251P	Radar Imaging	Falcon 9 Block 5	USSF-432 (SBST R-4)	Active	Starshield constellation codenamed USSF-432, launched with USA-726 to USA-748.
USA-742	2026-11-07	2026-251Q	Radar Imaging	Falcon 9 Block 5	USSF-432 (SBST R-4)	Active	Starshield constellation codenamed USSF-432, launched with USA-726 to USA-748.
USA-743	2026-11-07	2026-251R	Radar Imaging	Falcon 9 Block 5	USSF-432 (SBST R-4)	Active	Starshield constellation codenamed USSF-432, launched with USA-726 to USA-748.
USA-744	2026-11-07	2026-251S	Radar Imaging	Falcon 9 Block 5	USSF-432 (SBST R-4)	Active	Starshield constellation codenamed USSF-432, launched with USA-726 to USA-748.
USA-745	2026-11-07	2026-251T	Radar Imaging	Falcon 9 Block 5	USSF-432 (SBST R-4)	Active	Starshield constellation codenamed USSF-432, launched with USA-726 to USA-748.
USA-746	2026-11-07	2026-251U	Radar Imaging	Falcon 9 Block 5	USSF-432 (SBST R-4)	Active	Starshield constellation codenamed USSF-432, launched with USA-726 to USA-748.
USA-747	2026-11-07	2026-251V	Radar Imaging	Falcon 9 Block 5	USSF-432 (SBST R-4)	Active	Starshield constellation codenamed USSF-432, launched with USA-726 to USA-748.
USA-748	2026-11-07	2026-251W	Radar Imaging	Falcon 9 Block 5	USSF-432 (SBST R-4)	Active	Starshield constellation codenamed USSF-432, launched with USA-726 to USA-748.
USA-749	2026-11-12	2026-255A	Radar Imaging	Falcon 9 Block 5	USSF-627 (SBST R-5)	Active	Starshield constellation codenamed USSF-627, launched with USA-749 to USA-771.
USA-750	2026-11-12	2026-255B	Radar Imaging	Falcon 9 Block 5	USSF-627 (SBST R-5)	Active	Starshield constellation codenamed USSF-627, launched with USA-749 to USA-771.
USA-751	2026-11-12	2026-255C	Radar Imaging	Falcon 9 Block 5	USSF-627 (SBST R-5)	Active	Starshield constellation codenamed USSF-627, launched with USA-749 to USA-771.
USA-752	2026-11-12	2026-255D	Radar Imaging	Falcon 9 Block 5	USSF-627 (SBST R-5)	Active	Starshield constellation codenamed USSF-627, launched with USA-749 to USA-771.
USA-753	2026-11-12	2026-255E	Radar Imaging	Falcon 9 Block 5	USSF-627 (SBST R-5)	Active	Starshield constellation codenamed USSF-627, launched with USA-749 to USA-771.
USA-754	2026-11-12	2026-255F	Radar Imaging	Falcon 9 Block 5	USSF-627 (SBST R-5)	Active	Starshield constellation codenamed USSF-627, launched with USA-749 to USA-771.
USA-755	2026-11-12	2026-255G	Radar Imaging	Falcon 9 Block 5	USSF-627 (SBST R-5)	Active	Starshield constellation codenamed USSF-627, launched with USA-749 to USA-771.
USA-756	2026-11-12	2026-255H	Radar Imaging	Falcon 9 Block 5	USSF-627 (SBST R-5)	Active	Starshield constellation codenamed USSF-627, launched with USA-749 to USA-771.
USA-757	2026-11-12	2026-255I	Radar Imaging	Falcon 9 Block 5	USSF-627 (SBST R-5)	Active	Starshield constellation codenamed USSF-627, launched with USA-749 to USA-771.
USA-758	2026-11-12	2026-255J	Radar Imaging	Falcon 9 Block 5	USSF-627 (SBST R-5)	Active	Starshield constellation codenamed USSF-627, launched with USA-749 to USA-771.
USA-759	2026-11-12	2026-255K	Radar Imaging	Falcon 9 Block 5	USSF-627 (SBST R-5)	Active	Starshield constellation codenamed USSF-627, launched with USA-749 to USA-771.
USA-760	2026-11-12	2026-255L	Radar Imaging	Falcon 9 Block 5	USSF-627 (SBST R-5)	Active	Starshield constellation codenamed USSF-627, launched with USA-749 to USA-771.
USA-761	2026-11-12	2026-255M	Radar Imaging	Falcon 9 Block 5	USSF-627 (SBST R-5)	Active	Starshield constellation codenamed USSF-627, launched with USA-749 to USA-771.
USA-762	2026-11-12	2026-255N	Radar Imaging	Falcon 9 Block 5	USSF-627 (SBST R-5)	Active	Starshield constellation codenamed USSF-627, launched with USA-749 to USA-771.
USA-763	2026-11-12	2026-255O	Radar Imaging	Falcon 9 Block 5	USSF-627 (SBST R-5)	Active	Starshield constellation codenamed USSF-627, launched with USA-749 to USA-771.
USA-764	2026-11-12	2026-255P	Radar Imaging	Falcon 9 Block 5	USSF-627 (SBST R-5)	Active	Starshield constellation codenamed USSF-627, launched with USA-749 to USA-771.
USA-765	2026-11-12	2026-255Q	Radar Imaging	Falcon 9 Block 5	USSF-627 (SBST R-5)	Active	Starshield constellation codenamed USSF-627, launched with USA-749 to USA-771.
USA-766	2026-11-12	2026-255R	Radar Imaging	Falcon 9 Block 5	USSF-627 (SBST R-5)	Active	Starshield constellation codenamed USSF-627, launched with USA-749 to USA-771.
USA-767	2026-11-12	2026-255S	Radar Imaging	Falcon 9 Block 5	USSF-627 (SBST R-5)	Active	Starshield constellation codenamed USSF-627, launched with USA-749 to USA-771.
USA-768	2026-11-12	2026-255T	Radar Imaging	Falcon 9 Block 5	USSF-627 (SBST R-5)	Active	Starshield constellation codenamed USSF-627, launched with USA-749 to USA-771.
USA-769	2026-11-12	2026-255U	Radar Imaging	Falcon 9 Block 5	USSF-627 (SBST R-5)	Active	Starshield constellation codenamed USSF-627, launched with USA-749 to USA-771.
USA-770	2026-11-12	2026-255V	Radar Imaging	Falcon 9 Block 5	USSF-627 (SBST R-5)	Active	Starshield constellation codenamed USSF-627, launched with USA-749 to USA-771.
USA-771	2026-11-12	2026-255W	Radar Imaging	Falcon 9 Block 5	USSF-627 (SBST R-5)	Active	Starshield constellation codenamed USSF-627, launched with USA-749 to USA-771.
USA-726	2026-11-07	2026-251A	Radar Imaging	Falcon 9 Block 5	USSF-432 (SBST R-4)	Active	Starshield constellation codenamed USSF-432, launched with USA-726 to USA-748.
USA-727	2026-11-07	2026-251B	Radar Imaging	Falcon 9 Block 5	USSF-432 (SBST R-4)	Active	Starshield constellation codenamed USSF-432, launched with USA-726 to USA-748.
USA-728	2026-11-07	2026-251C	Radar Imaging	Falcon 9 Block 5	USSF-432 (SBST R-4)	Active	Starshield constellation codenamed USSF-432, launched with USA-726 to USA-748.
USA-729	2026-11-07	2026-251D	Radar Imaging	Falcon 9 Block 5	USSF-432 (SBST R-4)	Active	Starshield constellation codenamed USSF-432, launched with USA-726 to USA-748.
USA-730	2026-11-07	2026-251E	Radar Imaging	Falcon 9 Block 5	USSF-432 (SBST R-4)	Active	Starshield constellation codenamed USSF-432, launched with USA-726 to USA-748.
USA-731	2026-11-07	2026-251F	Radar Imaging	Falcon 9 Block 5	USSF-432 (SBST R-4)	Active	Starshield constellation codenamed USSF-432, launched with USA-726 to USA-748.
USA-732	2026-11-07	2026-251G	Radar Imaging	Falcon 9 Block 5	USSF-432 (SBST R-4)	Active	Starshield constellation codenamed USSF-432, launched with USA-726 to USA-748.
USA-733	2026-11-07	2026-251H	Radar Imaging	Falcon 9 Block 5	USSF-432 (SBST R-4)	Active	Starshield constellation codenamed USSF-432, launched with USA-726 to USA-748.
USA-734	2026-11-07	2026-251I	Radar Imaging	Falcon 9 Block 5	USSF-432 (SBST R-4)	Active	Starshield constellation codenamed USSF-432, launched with USA-726 to USA-748.
USA-735	2026-11-07	2026-251J	Radar Imaging	Falcon 9 Block 5	USSF-432 (SBST R-4)	Active	Starshield constellation codenamed USSF-432, launched with USA-726 to USA-748.
USA-736	2026-11-07	2026-251K	Radar Imaging	Falcon 9 Block 5	USSF-432 (SBST R-4)	Active	Starshield constellation codenamed USSF-432, launched with USA-726 to USA-748.
USA-737	2026-11-07	2026-251L	Radar Imaging	Falcon 9 Block 5	USSF-432 (SBST R-4)	Active	Starshield constellation codenamed USSF-432, launched with USA-726 to USA-748.
USA-738	2026-11-07	2026-251M	Radar Imaging	Falcon 9 Block 5	USSF-432 (SBST R-4)	Active	Starshield constellation codenamed USSF-432, launched with USA-726 to USA-748.
USA-739	2026-11-07	2026-251N	Radar Imaging	Falcon 9 Block 5	USSF-432 (SBST R-4)	Active	Starshield constellation codenamed USSF-432, launched with USA-726 to USA-748.
USA-740	2026-11-07	2026-251O	Radar Imaging	Falcon 9 Block 5	USSF-432 (SBST R-4)	Active	Starshield constellation codenamed USSF-432, launched with USA-726 to USA-748.
USA-741	2026-11-07	2026-251P	Radar Imaging	Falcon 9 Block 5	USSF-432 (SBST R-4)	Active	Starshield constellation codenamed USSF-432, launched with USA-726 to USA-748.
USA-742	2026-11-07	2026-251Q	Radar Imaging	Falcon 9 Block 5	USSF-432 (SBST R-4)	Active	Starshield constellation codenamed USSF-432, launched with USA-726 to USA-748.
USA-743	2026-11-07	2026-251R	Radar Imaging	Falcon 9 Block 5	USSF-432 (SBST R-4)	Active	Starshield constellation codenamed USSF-432, launched with USA-726 to USA-748.
USA-744	2026-11-07	2026-251S	Radar Imaging	Falcon 9 Block 5	USSF-432 (SBST R-4)	Active	Starshield constellation codenamed USSF-432, launched with USA-726 to USA-748.
USA-745	2026-11-07	2026-251T	Radar Imaging	Falcon 9 Block 5	USSF-432 (SBST R-4)	Active	Starshield constellation codenamed USSF-432, launched with USA-726 to USA-748.
USA-746	2026-11-07	2026-251U	Radar Imaging	Falcon 9 Block 5	USSF-432 (SBST R-4)	Active	Starshield constellation codenamed USSF-432, launched with USA-726 to USA-748.
USA-747	2026-11-07	2026-251V	Radar Imaging	Falcon 9 Block 5	USSF-432 (SBST R-4)	Active	Starshield constellation codenamed USSF-432, launched with USA-726 to USA-748.
USA-748	2026-11-07	2026-251W	Radar Imaging	Falcon 9 Block 5	USSF-432 (SBST R-4)	Active	Starshield constellation codenamed USSF-432, launched with USA-726 to USA-748.
USA-749	2026-11-12	2026-255A	Radar Imaging	Falcon 9 Block 5	USSF-627 (SBST R-5)	Active	Starshield constellation codenamed USSF-627, launched with USA-749 to USA-771.
USA-750	2026-11-12	2026-255B	Radar Imaging	Falcon 9 Block 5	USSF-627 (SBST R-5)	Active	Starshield constellation codenamed USSF-627, launched with USA-749 to USA-771.
USA-751	2026-11-12	2026-255C	Radar Imaging	Falcon 9 Block 5	USSF-627 (SBST R-5)	Active	Starshield constellation codenamed USSF-627, launched with USA-749 to USA-771.
USA-752	2026-11-12	2026-255D	Radar Imaging	Falcon 9 Block 5	USSF-627 (SBST R-5)	Active	Starshield constellation codenamed USSF-627, launched with USA-749 to USA-771.
USA-753	2026-11-12	2026-255E	Radar Imaging	Falcon 9 Block 5	USSF-627 (SBST R-5)	Active	Starshield constellation codenamed USSF-627, launched with USA-749 to USA-771.
USA-754	2026-11-12	2026-255F	Radar Imaging	Falcon 9 Block 5	USSF-627 (SBST R-5)	Active	Starshield constellation codenamed USSF-627, launched with USA-749 to USA-771.
USA-755	2026-11-12	2026-255G	Radar Imaging	Falcon 9 Block 5	USSF-627 (SBST R-5)	Active	Starshield constellation codenamed USSF-627, launched with USA-749 to USA-771.
USA-756	2026-11-12	2026-255H	Radar Imaging	Falcon 9 Block 5	USSF-627 (SBST R-5)	Active	Starshield constellation codenamed USSF-627, launched with USA-749 to USA-771.
USA-757	2026-11-12	2026-255I	Radar Imaging	Falcon 9 Block 5	USSF-627 (SBST R-5)	Active	Starshield constellation codenamed USSF-627, launched with USA-749 to USA-771.
USA-758	2026-11-12	2026-255J	Radar Imaging	Falcon 9 Block 5	USSF-627 (SBST R-5)	Active	Starshield constellation codenamed USSF-627, launched with USA-749 to USA-771.
USA-759	2026-11-12	2026-255K	Radar Imaging	Falcon 9 Block 5	USSF-627 (SBST R-5)	Active	Starshield constellation codenamed USSF-627, launched with USA-749 to USA-771.
USA-760	2026-11-12	2026-255L	Radar Imaging	Falcon 9 Block 5	USSF-627 (SBST R-5)	Active	Starshield constellation codenamed USSF-627, launched with USA-749 to USA-771.
USA-761	2026-11-12	2026-255M	Radar Imaging	Falcon 9 Block 5	USSF-627 (SBST R-5)	Active	Starshield constellation codenamed USSF-627, launched with USA-749 to USA-771.
USA-762	2026-11-12	2026-255N	Radar Imaging	Falcon 9 Block 5	USSF-627 (SBST R-5)	Active	Starshield constellation codenamed USSF-627, launched with USA-749 to USA-771.
USA-763	2026-11-12	2026-255O	Radar Imaging	Falcon 9 Block 5	USSF-627 (SBST R-5)	Active	Starshield constellation codenamed USSF-627, launched with USA-749 to USA-771.
USA-764	2026-11-12	2026-255P	Radar Imaging	Falcon 9 Block 5	USSF-627 (SBST R-5)	Active	Starshield constellation codenamed USSF-627, launched with USA-749 to USA-771.
USA-765	2026-11-12	2026-255Q	Radar Imaging	Falcon 9 Block 5	USSF-627 (SBST R-5)	Active	Starshield constellation codenamed USSF-627, launched with USA-749 to USA-771.
USA-766	2026-11-12	2026-255R	Radar Imaging	Falcon 9 Block 5	USSF-627 (SBST R-5)	Active	Starshield constellation codenamed USSF-627, launched with USA-749 to USA-771.
USA-767	2026-11-12	2026-255S	Radar Imaging	Falcon 9 Block 5	USSF-627 (SBST R-5)	Active	Starshield constellation codenamed USSF-627, launched with USA-749 to USA-771.
USA-768	2026-11-12	2026-255T	Radar Imaging	Falcon 9 Block 5	USSF-627 (SBST R-5)	Active	Starshield constellation codenamed USSF-627, launched with USA-749 to USA-771.
USA-769	2026-11-12	2026-255U	Radar Imaging	Falcon 9 Block 5	USSF-627 (SBST R-5)	Active	Starshield constellation codenamed USSF-627, launched with USA-749 to USA-771.
USA-770	2026-11-12	2026-255V	Radar Imaging	Falcon 9 Block 5	USSF-627 (SBST R-5)	Active	Starshield constellation codenamed USSF-627, launched with USA-749 to USA-771.
USA-771	2026-11-12	2026-255W	Radar Imaging	Falcon 9 Block 5	USSF-627 (SBST R-5)	Active	Starshield constellation codenamed USSF-627, launched with USA-749 to USA-771.

== See also ==
- List of USA satellites (1-500)
- List of NRO launches
- NSSL Missions
