= List of USSF launches =

American military satellites

The United States Space Force logo

This is a list of USSF Launch (USSF) designations for satellites operated by the United States Space Force (USSF). Those missions are generally classified, so that their exact purposes and orbital elements are not published.

== Launch statistics ==
=== Launch vehicle families ===
- Atlas
- Falcon
- Vulcan

=== Launch sites ===
- Cape Canaveral (FL)
- Kennedy (FL)
- Vandenberg (CA)

== Launch history ==
Launch designation	Payload nickname	Satellite designation	Date/time, UTC	Launch site	Rocket	Orbit	Project	Function	Status	Patch	Remarks
USSF-7		USA-229, 300	17 May 2020; 13:14:00	CCSFS, SLC-41	Atlas V 501	Low Earth	X-37B OTV-6	Technology demonstration	Mission successfully completed		First launch under USSF designation.
USSF-8		USA-324, 325	22 January 2022; 19:00:00	CCSFS, SLC-41	Atlas V 511	Geosynchronous	GSSAP-5 & 6	Space Surveillance	Entered service, status unknown		
USSF-12		USA-332, 333, 337	2 July 2022; 23:15	CCSFS, SLC-41	Atlas V 541	Geosynchronous	WFOV-T & USSF-12 Ring	Early warning, Technology demonstration	Entered service, status unknown		
USSF-15			2028	KSC, LC-39A	Falcon Heavy	Medium Earth	GPS IIIF-03	Navigation	Awaiting launch		
USSF-16			2026	CCSFS, SLC-41	Vulcan Centaur	TBA	TBA	TBA	Awaiting launch		
USSF-25			2027	CCSFS, SLC-41	Vulcan Centaur	Low Earth	DRACO Demo	Technology demonstration	Awaiting launch		
USSF-26			2026	CCSFS, SLC-41	Vulcan Centaur	TBA	TBA	TBA	Awaiting launch		
USSF-31			2026	CCSFS, SLC-40 or KSC, LC-39A	Falcon 9 Block 5	TBA	TBA	TBA	Awaiting launch		
USSF-36		USA-555	22 August 2025; 03:40	KSC, LC-39A	Falcon 9 Block 5	Low Earth	X-37B OTV-8	TBA	Entered service, status unknown		
USSF-43			2026	CCSFS, SLC-41	Vulcan Centaur	Geosynchronous	LDPE-4 & Others	Technology demonstration	Awaiting launch		
USSF-44		USA-339, 340, 341, 344, 399, 546, 547, 548, 551, 552, 553	1 November 2022; 13:41	KSC, LC-39A	Falcon Heavy	Geosynchronous	Shepherd Demonstration & LDPE-2	Technology demonstration & Others	Entered service, status unknown		
USSF-49			2027	CCSFS, SLC-41	Vulcan Centaur	Medium Earth	GPS IIIF-02	Navigation	Awaiting launch		
USSF-50			2027	CCSFS, SLC-41	Vulcan Centaur	Geosynchronous	NG-OPIR-GEO II	Early warning	Awaiting launch		
USSF-51		USA-396, 397, 398, 566	30 July 2024; 10:45	CCSFS, SLC-41	Atlas V 551	Geosynchronous	-	TBA	Entered service, status unknown		
USSF-52		USA-349	29 December 2023; 01:07:00	KSC, LC-39A	Falcon Heavy	Highly elliptical HEO	X-37B OTV-7	Military communications	Mission successfully completed		
USSF-57			2026	CCSFS, SLC-41	Vulcan Centaur	Geosynchronous	NG-OPIR-GEO I	Early warning	Awaiting launch		
USSF-62		-	11 April 2024; 14:25	VSFB, SLC-4E	Falcon 9 Block 5	Sun-synchronous	WSF-M1	Meteorology	Entered service, status unknown		
USSF-63			2027	KSC, LC-39A	Falcon Heavy	TBA	TBA	TBA	Awaiting launch		
USSF-67		USA-342	15 January 2023; 22:56	KSC, LC-39A	Falcon Heavy	Geosynchronous	CBAS-2 & LDPE-3A	Communications, Technology demonstration	Entered service, status unknown		
USSF-70			2027	KSC, LC-39A	Falcon Heavy	Geosynchronous	LDPE-4 & Others	Technology demonstration	Awaiting launch		
USSF-75			2027	KSC, LC-39A	Falcon Heavy	TBA	TBA	TBA	Awaiting launch		
USSF-87			12 February 2026; 09:22	CCSFS, SLC-41	Vulcan Centaur VC4S	Geosynchronous	GSSAP-7 & 8	Space Surveillance	Entered service, status unknown		
USSF-88			2028	CCSFS, SLC-40	Vulcan Centaur	Medium Earth	GPS IIIF-04	Navigation	Awaiting launch		
USSF-95			2026	CCSFS, SLC-41	Vulcan Centaur	Medium Earth	MTC Epoch-1 1	Missile tracking	Awaiting launch		
USSF-106		USA-554, USA-571	13 August 2025; 00:56	CCSFS, SLC-41	Vulcan Centaur VC4S	Geosynchronous	NTS-3	Navigation & Others	Entered service, status unknown		First NSSL mission for Vulcan Centaur.
USSF-112			2026	CCSFS, SLC-41	Vulcan Centaur VC4S	TBA	TBA	TBA	Awaiting launch		
USSF-114			2026	VSFB, SLC-3E	Vulcan Centaur	TBA	TBA	TBA	Awaiting launch		
USSF-124		-	15 February 2024; 22:30	CCSFS, SLC-40	Falcon 9 Block 5	Low Earth	HBTSS-1, 2 & Others	Early warning & Others	Entered service, status unknown		
USSF-149			2027	CCSFS, SLC-40 or KSC, LC-39A	Falcon 9 Block 5	TBA	TBA	TBA	Awaiting launch		
USSF-153	SBST R-2	USA-644 - USA-666	10 September 2026; 15:42:30	VSFB, SLC-4E	Falcon 9 Block 5	Low Earth	TBA	TBA	Entered service, status unknown		Possibly a batch of 23 classified LEO satellites for a US government entity based on SpaceX’s Starshield satellite bus.
USSF-155			2027	KSC, LC-39A	Falcon Heavy	TBA	TBA	TBA	Awaiting launch		
USSF-174			2027	KSC, LC-39A	Falcon Heavy	TBA	TBA	TBA	Awaiting launch		
USSF-178			2027	VSFB, SLC-4E or SLC-6	Falcon 9 Block 5	Sun-synchronous	WSF-M2 & BLAZE-2	Meteorology & Others	Awaiting launch		
USSF-186			2027	KSC, LC-39A	Falcon Heavy	TBA	TBA	TBA	Awaiting launch		
USSF-206			2027	KSC, LC-39A	Falcon Heavy	Geosynchronous	WGS-12	TBA	Awaiting launch		
USSF-234			2027	CCSFS, SLC-40 or KSC, LC-39A	Falcon 9 Block 5	TBA	TBA	TBA	Awaiting launch		
USSF-259	SBST TH-1	USA-668 - USA-684	17 September 2026; 01:07:56	VSFB, SLC-4E	Falcon 9 Block 5	Low Earth	TBA	TBA	Entered service, status unknown		Possibly a batch of 17 classified LEO satellites for a US government entity based on SpaceX’s Starshield satellite bus.
USSF-261S−A			2027	VSFB, SLC-8	Minotaur IV	Sun-synchronous	EWS-OD 1	TBA	Awaiting launch		
USSF-266	SBST TH-3		24 November 2026; 15:55	VSFB, SLC-4E	Falcon 9 Block 5	Low Earth	TBA	TBA	Awaiting launch		Possibly a batch of classified LEO satellites for a US government entity based on SpaceX’s Starshield satellite bus.
USSF-317	SBST R-6		21 November 2026; 04:20	VSFB, SLC-4E	Falcon 9 Block 5	Low Earth	TBA	TBA	Entered service, status unknown		Possibly a batch of classified LEO satellites for a US government entity based on SpaceX’s Starshield satellite bus.
USSF-366	SBST R-1	USA-610 - USA-618	16 August 2026; 01:50:45	VSFB, SLC-4E	Falcon 9 Block 5	Low Earth	TBA	TBA	Entered service, status unknown		Possibly a batch of 9 classified LEO satellites for a US government entity based on SpaceX’s Starshield satellite bus.
USSF-380	SBST R-7		29 November 2026; 04:39	VSFB, SLC-4E	Falcon 9 Block 5	Low Earth	TBA	TBA	Awaiting launch		Possibly a batch of classified LEO satellites for a US government entity based on SpaceX’s Starshield satellite bus.
USSF-385	SBST R-3	USA-685 - USA-707	26 September 2026; 14:00	VSFB, SLC-4E	Falcon 9 Block 5	Low Earth	TBA	TBA	Entered service, status unknown		Possibly a batch of 23 classified LEO satellites for a US government entity based on SpaceX’s Starshield satellite bus.
USSF-432	SBST R-4	USA-726 - USA-748	7 November 2026; 00:48	VSFB, SLC-4E	Falcon 9 Block 5	Low Earth	TBA	TBA	Entered service, status unknown		Possibly a batch of 23 classified LEO satellites for a US government entity based on SpaceX’s Starshield satellite bus.
USSF-481	SBST TH-2	USA-709 - USA-725	16 October 2026; 00:01	VSFB, SLC-4E	Falcon 9 Block 5	Low Earth	TBA	TBA	Entered service, status unknown		Possibly a batch of 17 classified LEO satellites for a US government entity based on SpaceX’s Starshield satellite bus.
USSF-627	SBST R-5	USA-749 - USA-771	12 November 2026; 04:36	VSFB, SLC-4E	Falcon 9 Block 5	Low Earth	TBA	TBA	Entered service, status unknown		Possibly a batch of 23 classified LEO satellites for a US government entity based on SpaceX’s Starshield satellite bus.
Launch designation	Launch name	Satellite designation	Launch date/time (UTC)	Launch site	Rocket	Orbit	Project	Function	Status	Patch	Remarks

== Gallery ==
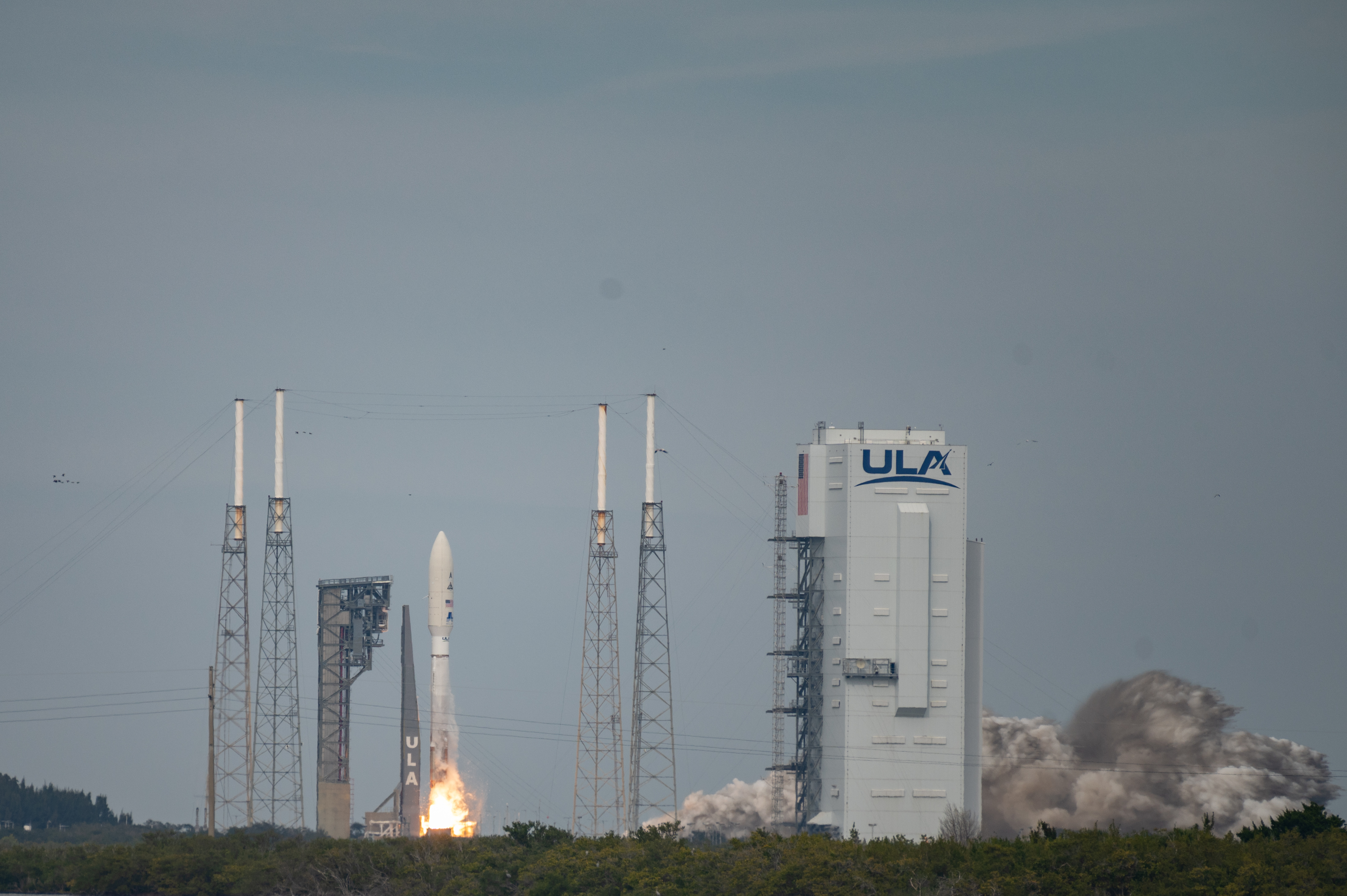
USSF-8 Launch

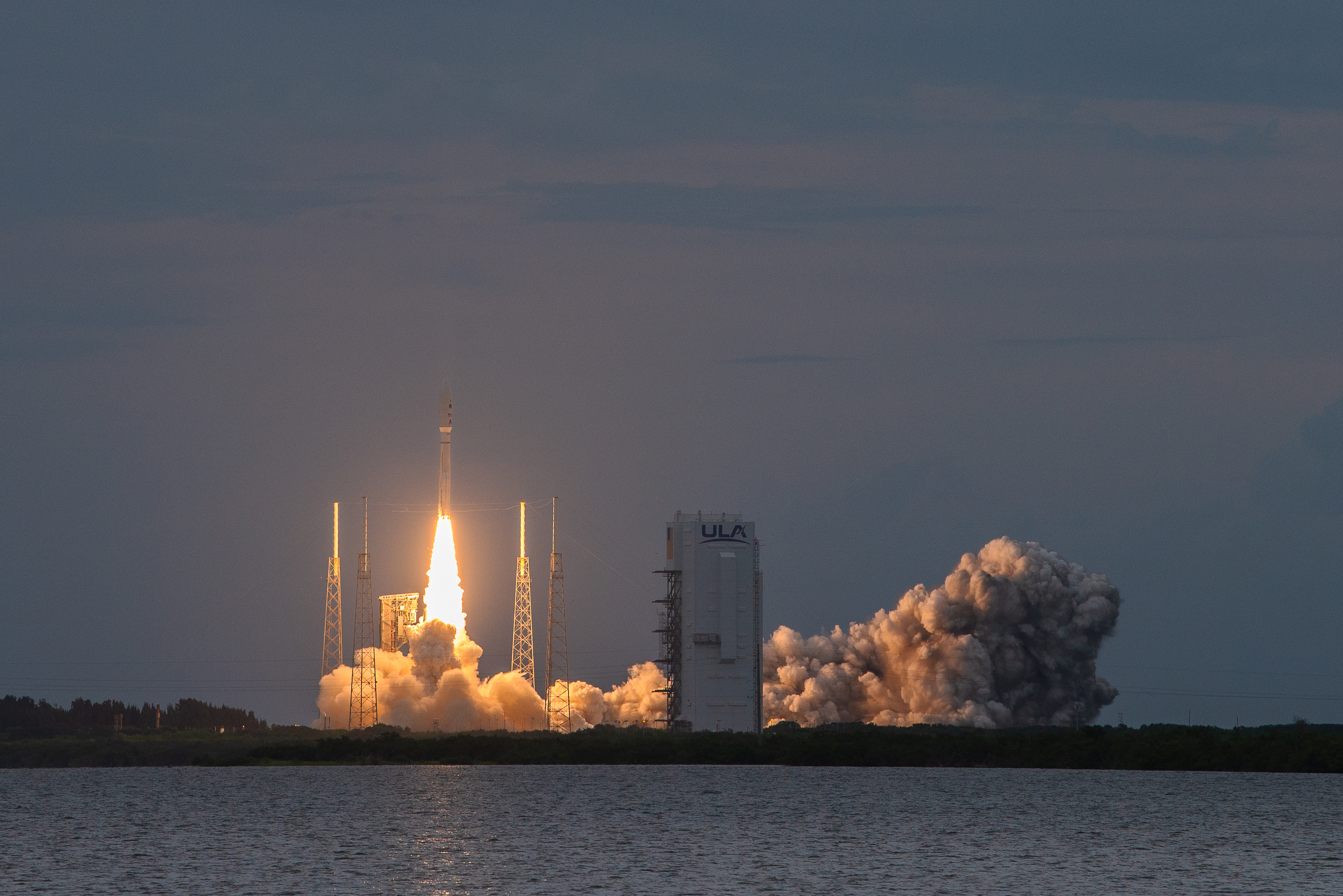
USSF-12 Launch

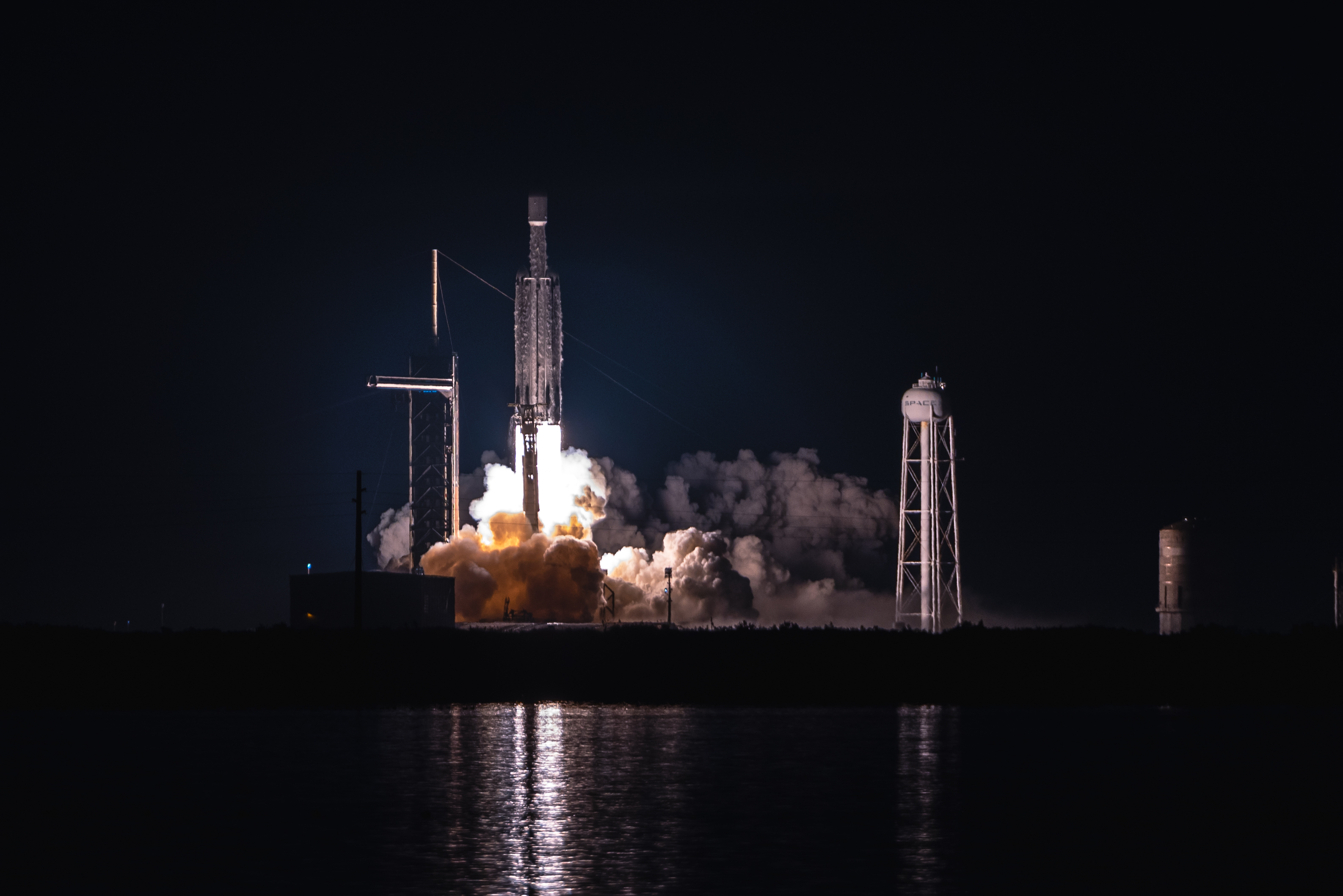
USSF-52 Launch

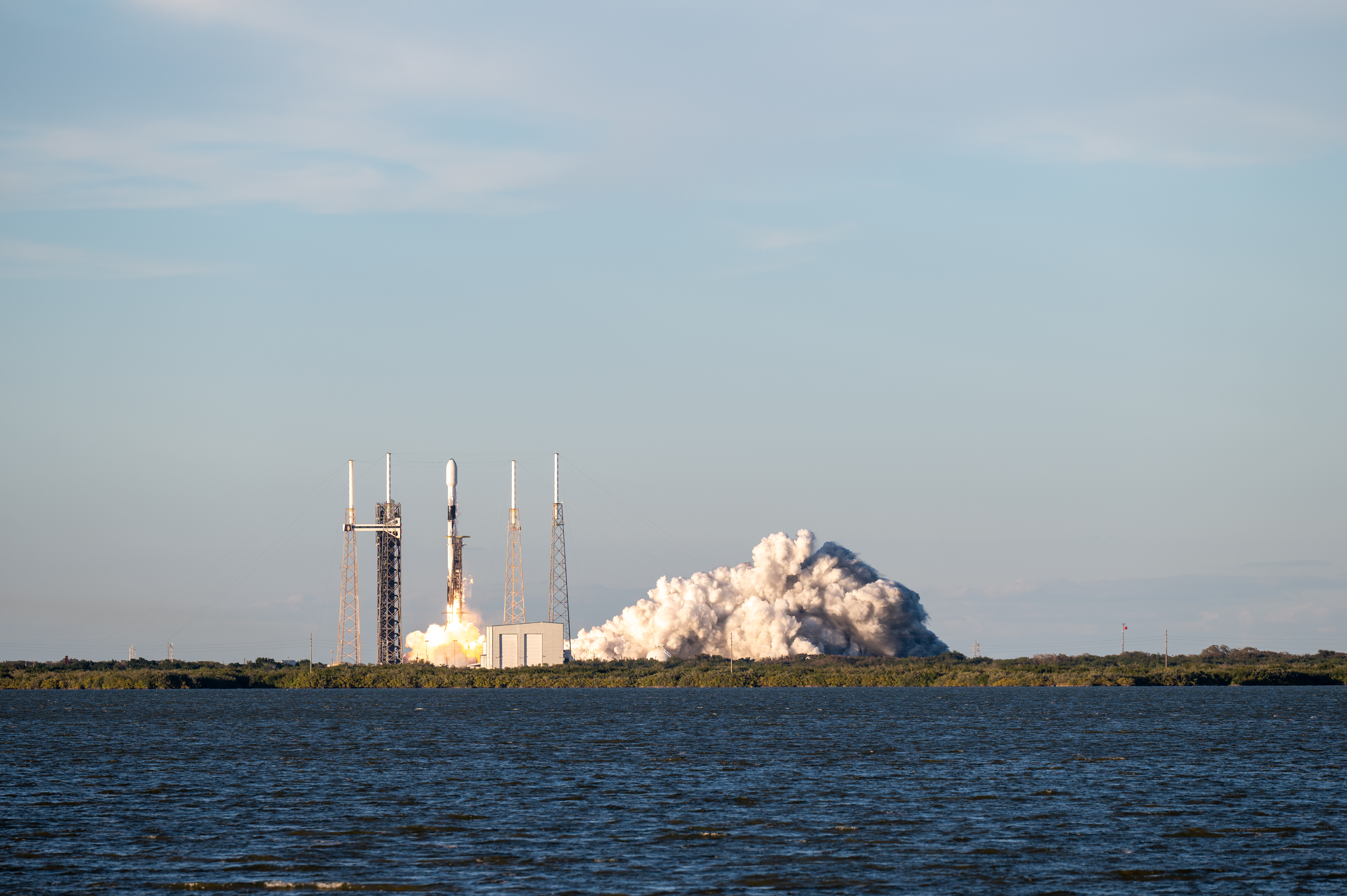
USSF-124 Launch

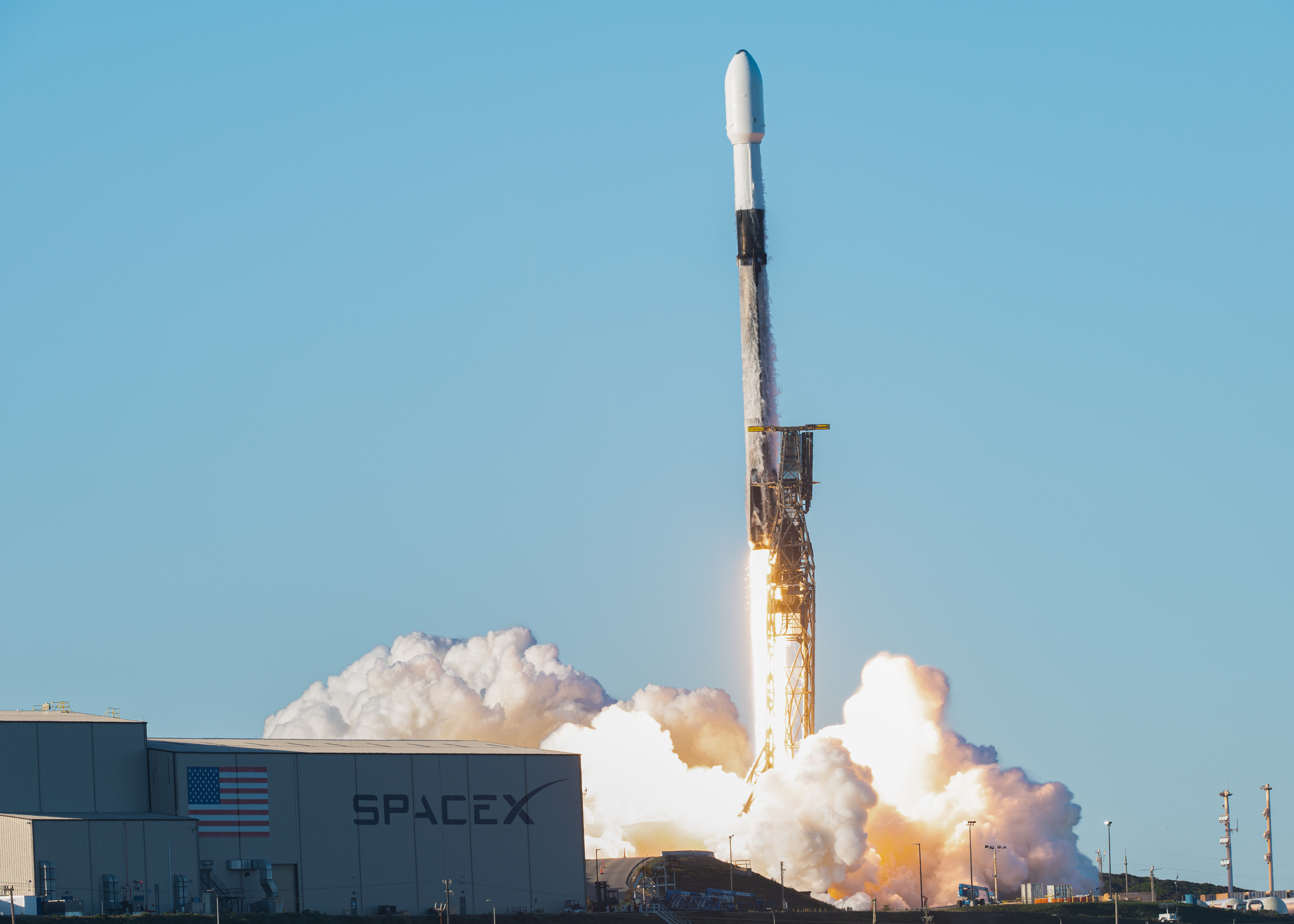
USSF-62 Launch

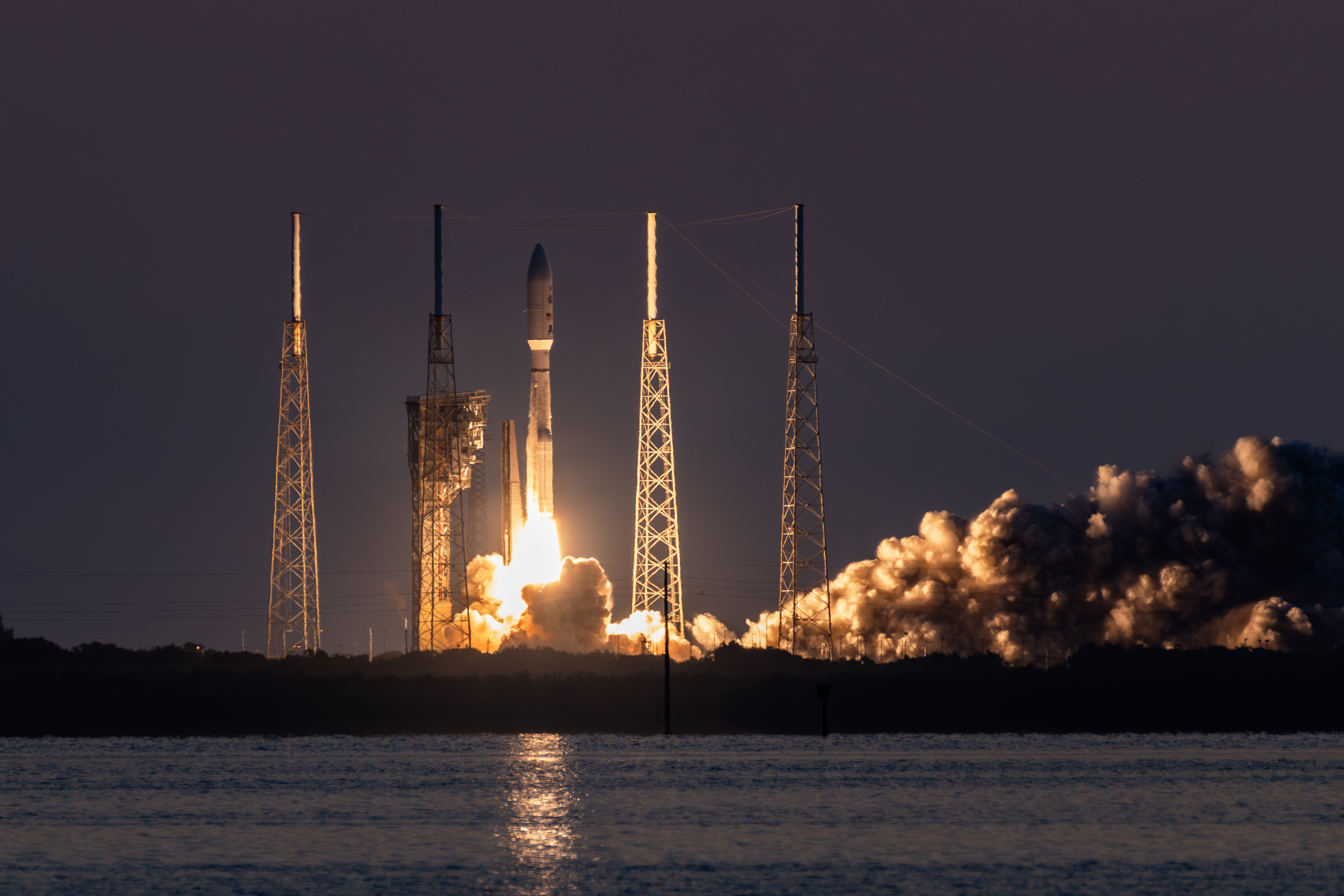
USSF-51 Launch

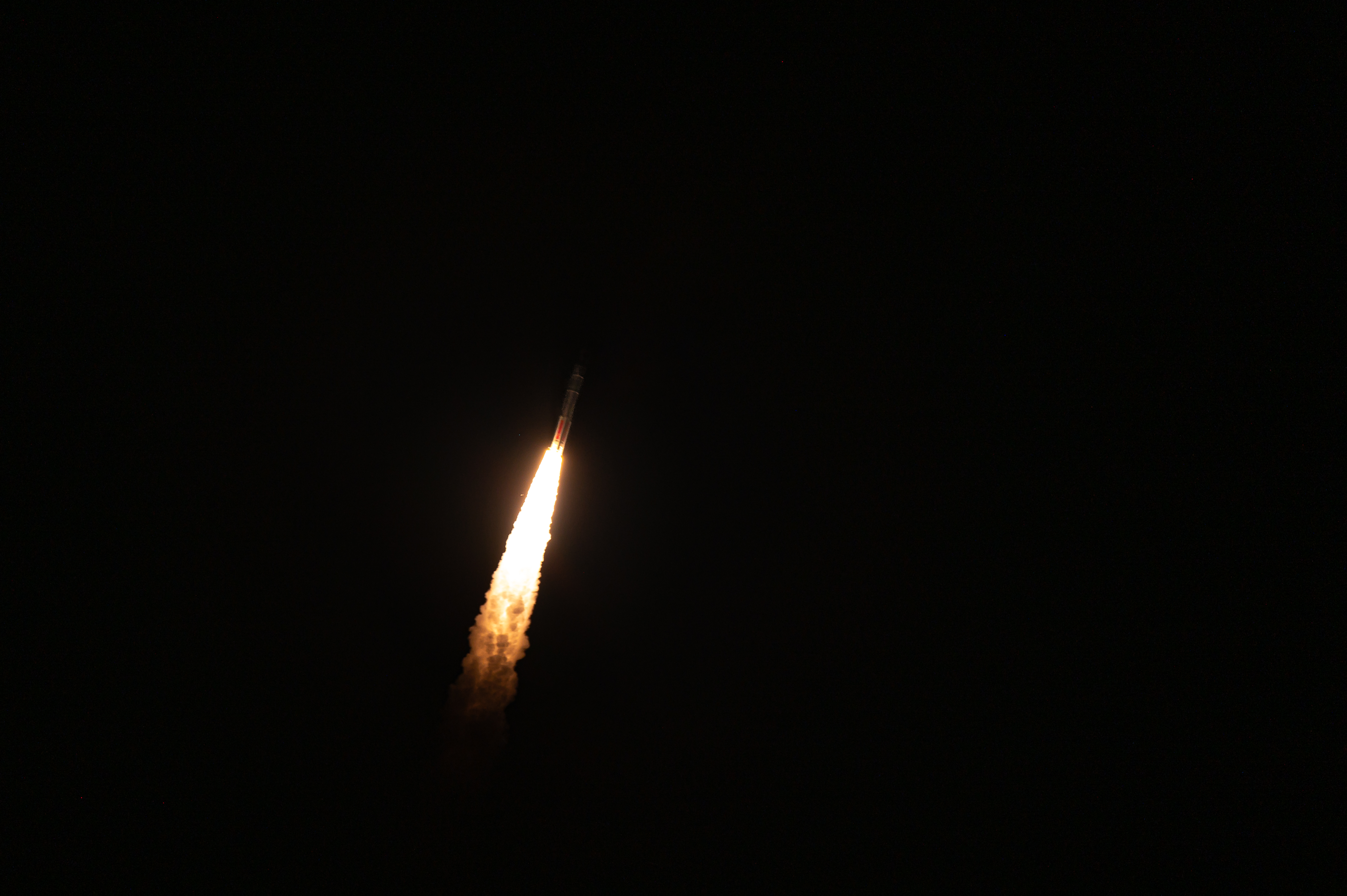
USSF-106 Launch

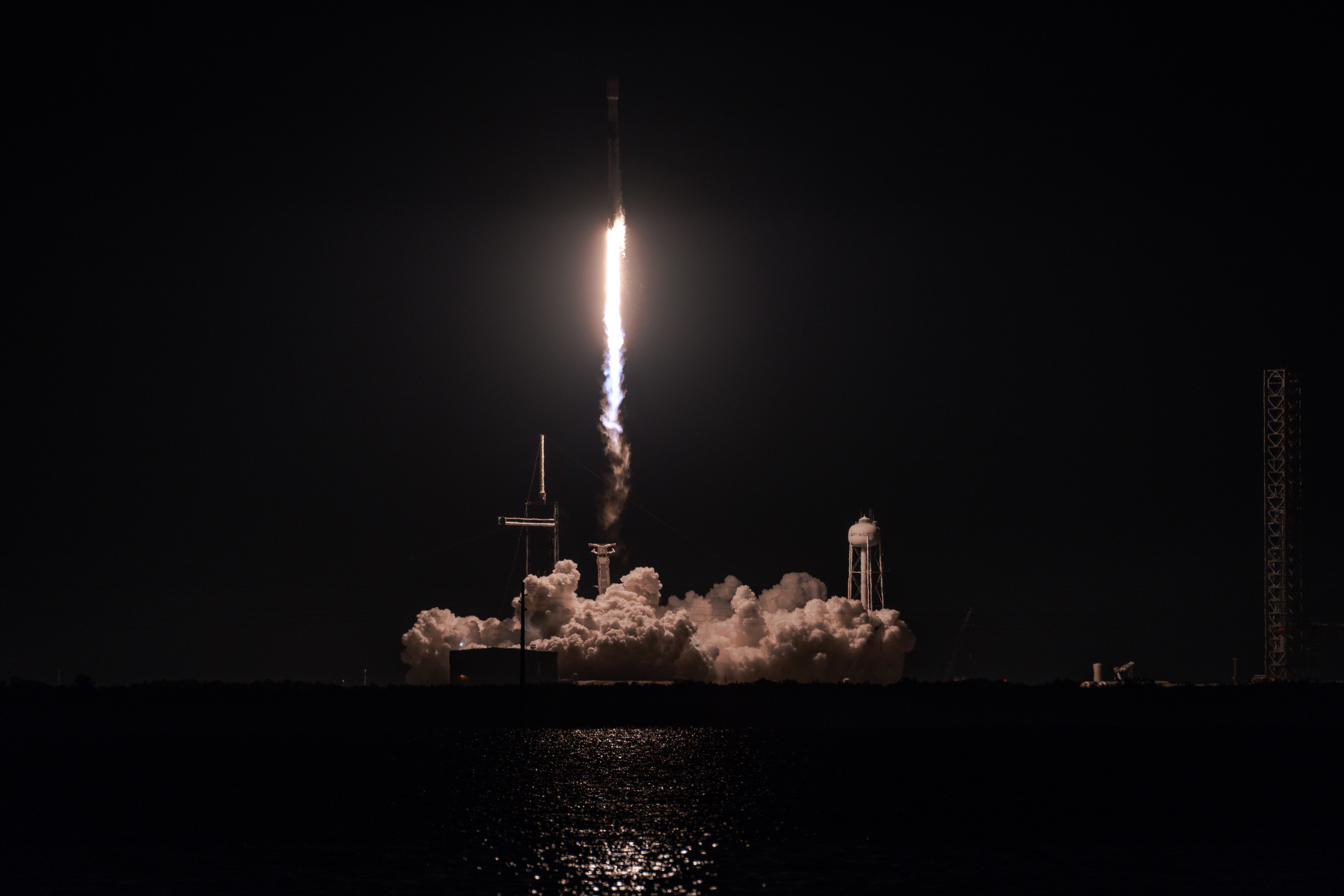
USSF-36 Launch

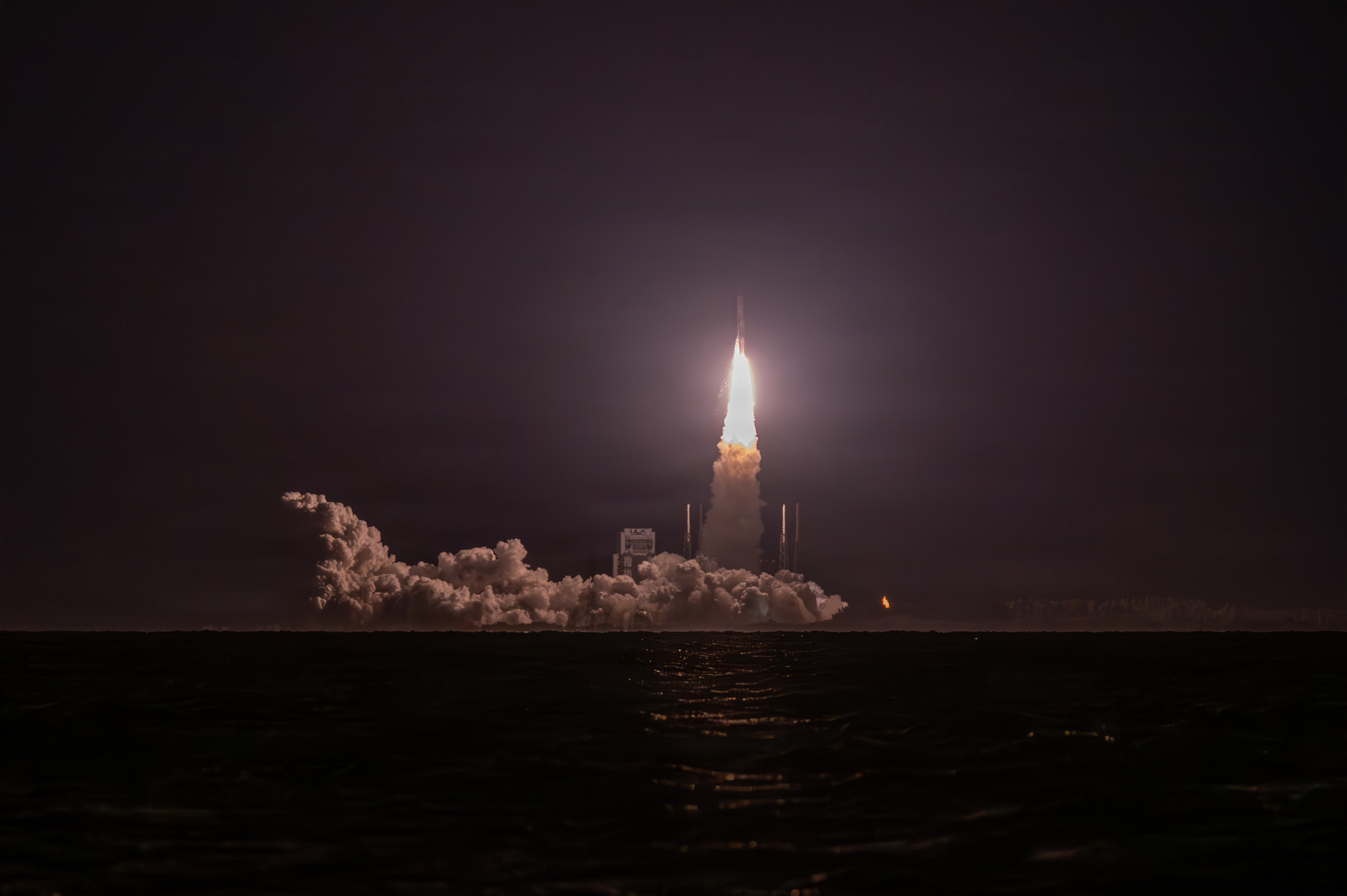
USSF-87 Launch

== See also ==
- List of USA satellites
- List of NRO launches
- National Security Space Launch#Missions
