= NRO Proliferated Architecture Mission =

NRO's Proliferated Architecture

The National Reconnaissance Office (NRO) Proliferated Architecture Mission represents a transformation approach to satellite-based intelligence, surveillance, and reconnaissance (ISR) capabilities for the United States. Unlike traditional NRO programs that relies on number of large and complex satellites, the Proliferated Architecture employs a constellation of numerous smaller, cost-effective, satellites deployed across multiple orbital planes. The Technology is a cornerstone of NRO's Mission to maintain Technological superiority in Space-based reconnaissance and other services.

== Development and Objective ==
The NRO began developing its proliferated architecture in the early 2020s, with initial demonstration satellites launched to validate cost, performance, and operational concepts. The program’s primary objectives include, Increased Revisit Rates, Enhanced Resilience, Rapid Data Delivery and Cost Efficiency.

The architecture supports a hybrid model, integrating traditional high-capability satellites with proliferated systems to create a diversified and robust ISR network. This approach ensures flexibility in contested environments and supports missions such as ground moving target indication (GMTI), signals intelligence (SIGINT), and imagery intelligence (IMINT).

== Missions ==
The NRO’s proliferated architecture has been advanced through a series of launches, primarily using SpaceX’s Falcon 9 rockets from Vandenberg Space Force Base, California, in collaboration with the U.S. Space Force’s Space Launch Delta 30.

Name	COSPAR ID SATCAT №	Launch date	Launch vehicle	Launch site	Launch designation	Patch	Orbit	Remarks
USA-354 - USA-374		22 May 2024; 08:00	Falcon 9 Block 5	VSFB, SLC-4E	NROL-146		425 × 310 km × 69.7° LEO	NRO's Proliferated Architecture Mission of 21 Starshield satellites.
USA-375 - USA-395		29 June 2024; 03:14	Falcon 9 Block 5	VSFB, SLC-4E	NROL-186		LEO	NRO's Proliferated Architecture Mission of 21 Starshield satellites.
USA-400 - USA-420		6 September 2024; 03:20	Falcon 9 Block 5	VSFB, SLC-4E	NROL-113		LEO	NRO's Proliferated Architecture Mission of 21 Starshield satellites.
USA-421 - USA-437		24 October 2024; 17:13	Falcon 9 Block 5	VSFB, SLC-4E	NROL-167		LEO	NRO's Proliferated Architecture Mission of 17 Starshield satellites.
USA 438, USA 339		30 November 2024; 8:10	Falcon 9 Block 5	VSFB, SLC-4E	NROL-126		LEO	NRO's Proliferated Architecture Mission of 2 Starshield satellites with 20 Starlink Group N-01 satellites.
USA-441 - USA-462		17 December 2024; 13:19	Falcon 9 Block 5	VSFB, SLC-4E	NROL-149		425 × 310 km × 69.7° LEO	NRO's Proliferated Architecture Mission of 22 Starshield satellites.
USA-463 - USA-484		10 January 2025; 03:53	Falcon 9 Block 5	VSFB, SLC-4E	NROL-153		425 × 310 km × 69.7° LEO	NRO's Proliferated Architecture Mission of 22 Starshield satellites.
USA-487 - USA-497		21 March 2025; 06:49	Falcon 9 Block 5	VSFB, SLC-4E	NROL-57		425 × 310 km × 69.7° LEO	NRO's Proliferated Architecture Mission of 11 Starshield satellites.
USA-499 - USA-520		12 April 2025 12:25	Falcon 9 Block 5	VSFB, SLC-4E	NROL-192		LEO	NRO's Proliferated Architecture Mission of 22 Starshield satellites.
USA-523 - USA-544		20 April 2025; 12:29	Falcon 9 Block 5	VSFB, SLC-4E	NROL-145		LEO	NRO's Proliferated Architecture Mission of 22 Starshield satellites. First NRO Proliferated Architecture Mission launch in partnership with USSF under the NSSL Phase 3 Lane 1 contract.
USA-558 - USA-565		21 September 2025; 17:35	Falcon 9 Block 5	VSFB, SLC-4E	NROL-48		LEO	NRO's Proliferated Architecture Mission of Starshield satellites.
USA-572 - USA-573		17 January 2026; 04:18:00	Falcon 9 Block 5	VSFB, SLC-4E	NROL-105		LEO	

== Operational Phase ==
In October 2024, NRO Director Chris Scolese announced the transition of the proliferated constellation from demonstration to operational status. This shift allows the NRO to test and integrate the constellation in real-world scenarios, enhancing its ability to deliver actionable intelligence. The constellation, numbering over 150 satellites by April 2025, supports time-sensitive missions by providing frequent revisits and diversified communication pathways. The operational phase emphasizes, Global Coverage, Data Integration and Commercial Partnerships.

== See also ==
- SDA - Another Agency working on Proliferated Architecture named Tranche.
