= USSF-106 =

United States Space Force National security Mission

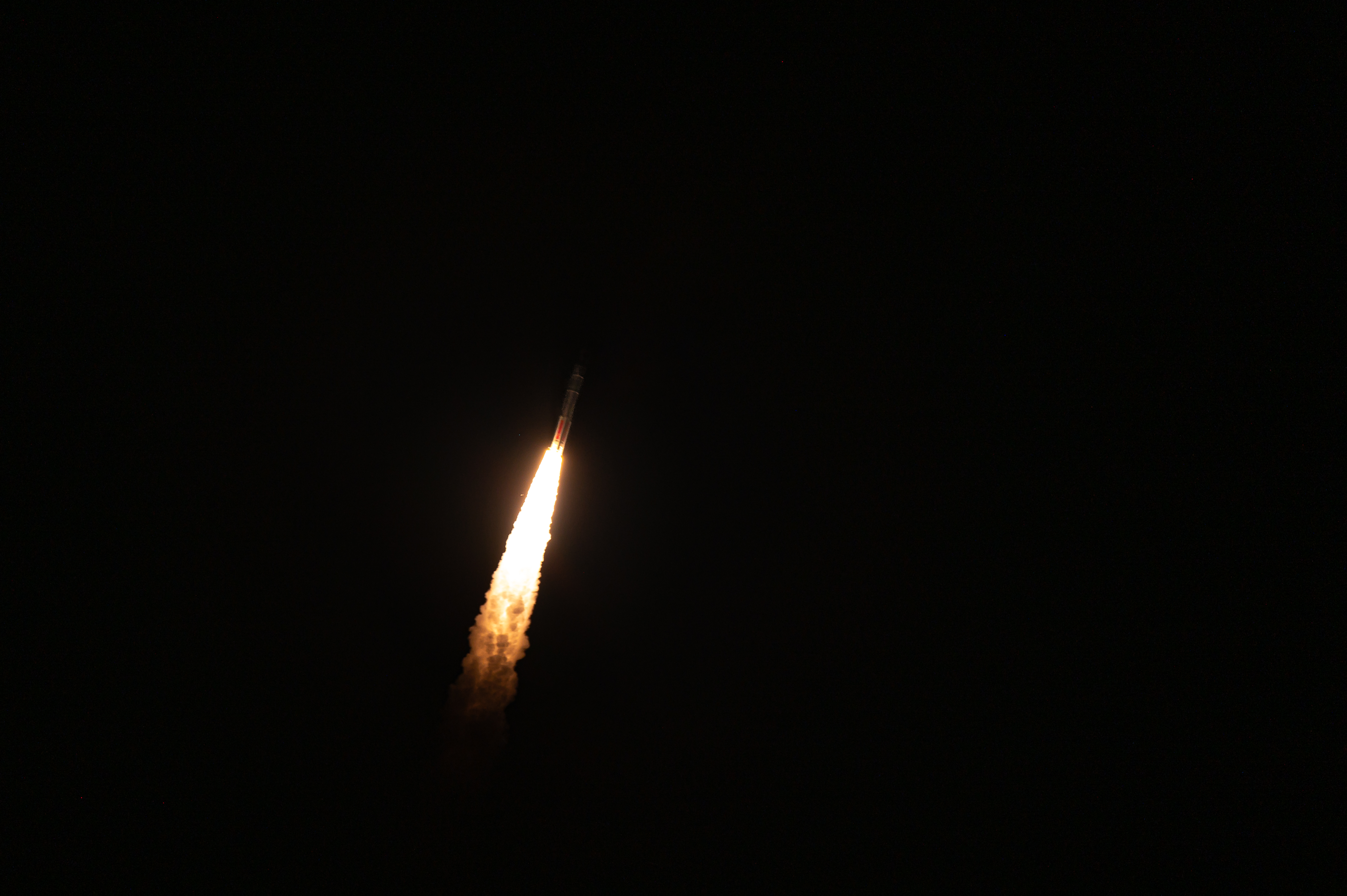
- USSF-106 Launch
- Mission type: Technology demonstration
- Operator: USSF

Spacecraft properties
- Spacecraft type: ESPAStar
- Manufacturer: Northrop Grumman

Start of mission
- Launch date: 13 August 2025 00:56 UTC
- Rocket: Vulcan Centaur VC4S (V-003)
- Launch site: Cape Canaveral, SLC-41
- Contractor: United Launch Alliance

Orbital parameters
- Reference system: Geocentric orbit
- Regime: Geosynchronous orbit

USSF-106 is an American National Security Space Launch mission operated by the United States Space Force. It was the first NSSL mission to use United Launch Alliance's Vulcan Centaur launch vehicle. After reaching orbit, two satellites were deployed, both based on Northrop Grumman's ESPAStar satellite bus: the NTS-3 demonstrator, and USA-554. An additional satellite, USA-571, was deployed soon after.

== Overview ==
USSF-106 was assigned to the ULA in 2020. At the time, it had not been planned to be the inaugural NSSL launch on Vulcan Centaur, which was USSF-51; USSF-51's payload was transferred to an Atlas V before launch.

The rocket launched on 13 August 2025; confirmation of a successful launch was reported seven hours later, marking the ULA's longest geosynchronous mission.

== See also ==
- List of USA satellites
- List of USSF launches
- National Security Space Launch
