= USSF-51 =

United States Space Force National security Mission

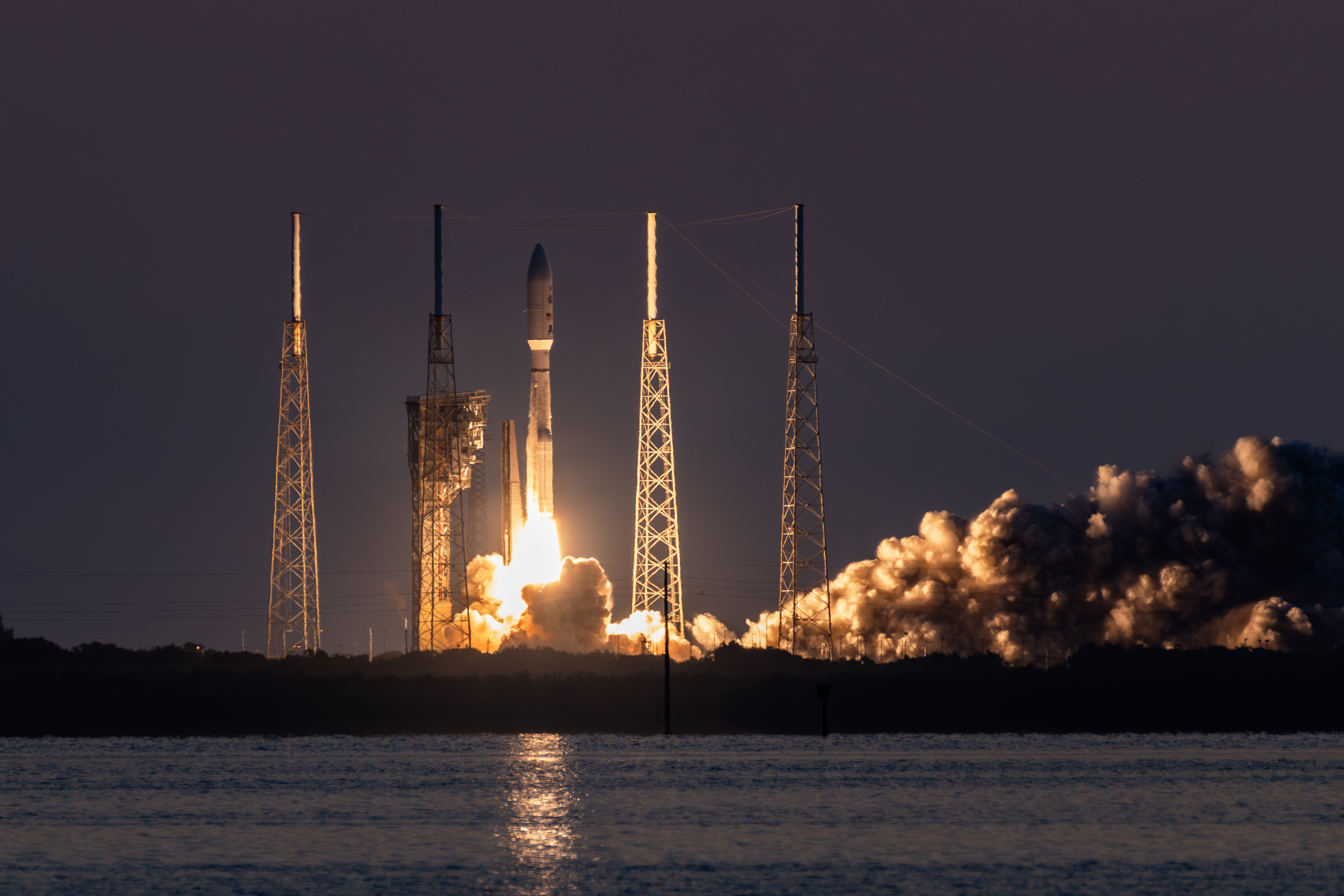
- USSF-51 Launch
- Operator: USSF

Start of mission
- Launch date: 30 July 2024 10:45 UTC
- Rocket: Atlas V 551 (AV-101)
- Launch site: Cape Canaveral, SLC-41
- Contractor: United Launch Alliance

Orbital parameters
- Reference system: Geocentric orbit
- Regime: Geosynchronous orbit

USSF-51 is an American National Security Space Launch mission operated by the United States Space Force. It was the final NSSL mission to be launched on the United Launch Alliance's Atlas V launch vehicle. Three satellites were deployed after reaching orbit: USA-396, USA-397, and USA-398. In October 2025, four additional satellites were deployed: USA-566, USA-567, USA-568, and USA-569.

== Overview ==
The Space Force assigned the USSF-51 mission to the ULA in 2020. At the time it was planned to be the first NSSL mission to use ULA's Vulcan Centaur vehicle, only to be reassigned (and its payload transferred) to an Atlas V, with USSF-106 becoming the first mission to use Vulcan Centaur.

Along with being the last mission to use Atlas V, USSF-51 was also the last mission to use a vehicle propelled by Russian-built RD-180 engines, with the American-built Blue Origin BE-4 engines being used on Vulcan Centaur.

== See also ==
- List of USA satellites
- List of USSF launches
- National Security Space Launch
