= SpaceX Starshield =

Satellite series for military customers

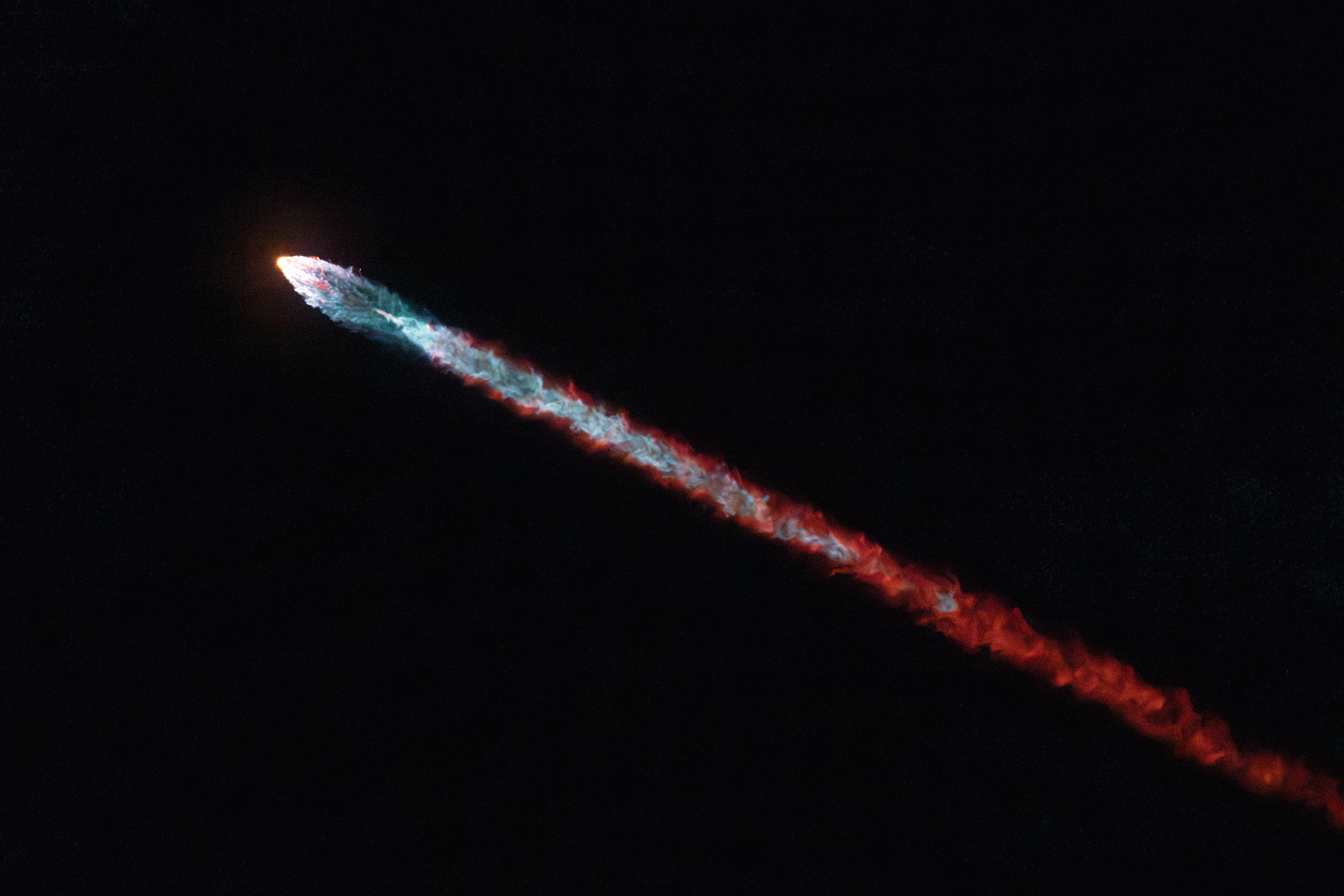
The 2026 launch of NROL-105, a Starshield mission.

Starshield is a division of SpaceX's Starlink subsidiary creating purpose-built low-Earth-orbit (LEO) satellites designed to provide new military space capabilities to the United States and allied governments. Starshield was adapted from the global communications network Starlink but has additional capabilities, such as target tracking, optical and radio reconnaissance, and early missile warnings. Primary customers include the Space Development Agency (SDA), National Reconnaissance Office, and the United States Space Force. NROL-105, launched on 16 January 2026, was the twelfth launch of the National Reconnaissance Office's proliferated constellation, which the agency says has hundreds of satellites in orbit.

While SpaceX president and COO Gwynne Shotwell has indicated that there is little information she is allowed to disclose about Starshield, she has noted "very good collaboration" between the intelligence community and SpaceX on the program. The U.S. Congressional Research Service reports that future satellites in Starshield's participating SDA program may wield interceptor missiles, hypersonic projectiles, or directed energy weapons, and the program's founder added that "since Reagan’s day, technology has advanced enough that putting both sensors and shooters in space is not only possible but relatively easy." According to SDA director Derek Tournear, later satellites will take on the “extremely difficult” task of maintaining contact with missiles in flight.

SpaceX has received billions of dollars from the United States government to develop Golden Dome, an orbital weapons system with both offensive and defensive capabilities for missile interception and global strike.

The retired four-star general Terrence O'Shaughnessy, who previously ran U.S. Northern Command, is the vice president for SpaceX's Special Programs Group, which is thought to be involved with Starshield. For weapons manufacturing, eight senior Starshield leaders formed an additional company, Castelion, to develop mass-produced hypersonic strike weapons, potentially for use as space-based interceptors.

The first satellites were designed for the SDA and outfitted with advanced infrared sensors meant to detect and track ballistic and hypersonic missiles. In 2021, Starshield entered a $1.8 billion classified contract with the U.S. government, revealed in 2023, to construct hundreds of spy satellites for continuous real-time monitoring of targets around the globe. Launches of the NRO's proliferated constellation began in May 2024 with NROL-146. These satellites are being built in cooperation with Northrop Grumman.

Elon Musk, SpaceX's CEO and CTO, has stated that Starshield systems are owned and controlled by the U.S. government. Reporting on specific Starshield-related networks has described differing operational arrangements. In June 2025, Breaking Defense reported that MILNET would be government-owned and operated by SpaceX under Space Force oversight.

== History ==
The Starshield name was publicly announced December 2022, but in 2021 Starshield had already entered a $1.8 billion classified contract with the U.S. government, revealed in 2023. In the documents of the contract, SpaceX says that funds from the contract were expected to become an important part of the revenue mix of the company after 2021. Reuters revealed in 2024 that this contract was between the National Reconnaissance Office and SpaceX, and for a spy satellite network consisting of hundreds of satellites functioning as a swarm. The satellites will have imaging capabilities, and the satellite network will enable the US government to have continuous surveillance of nearly anywhere around the globe. Starshield also plans to be more resilient to attack from other powers. Northrop Grumman was selected to partner with SpaceX, with insiders noting that "it is in the government's interest to not be totally invested in one company run by one person".

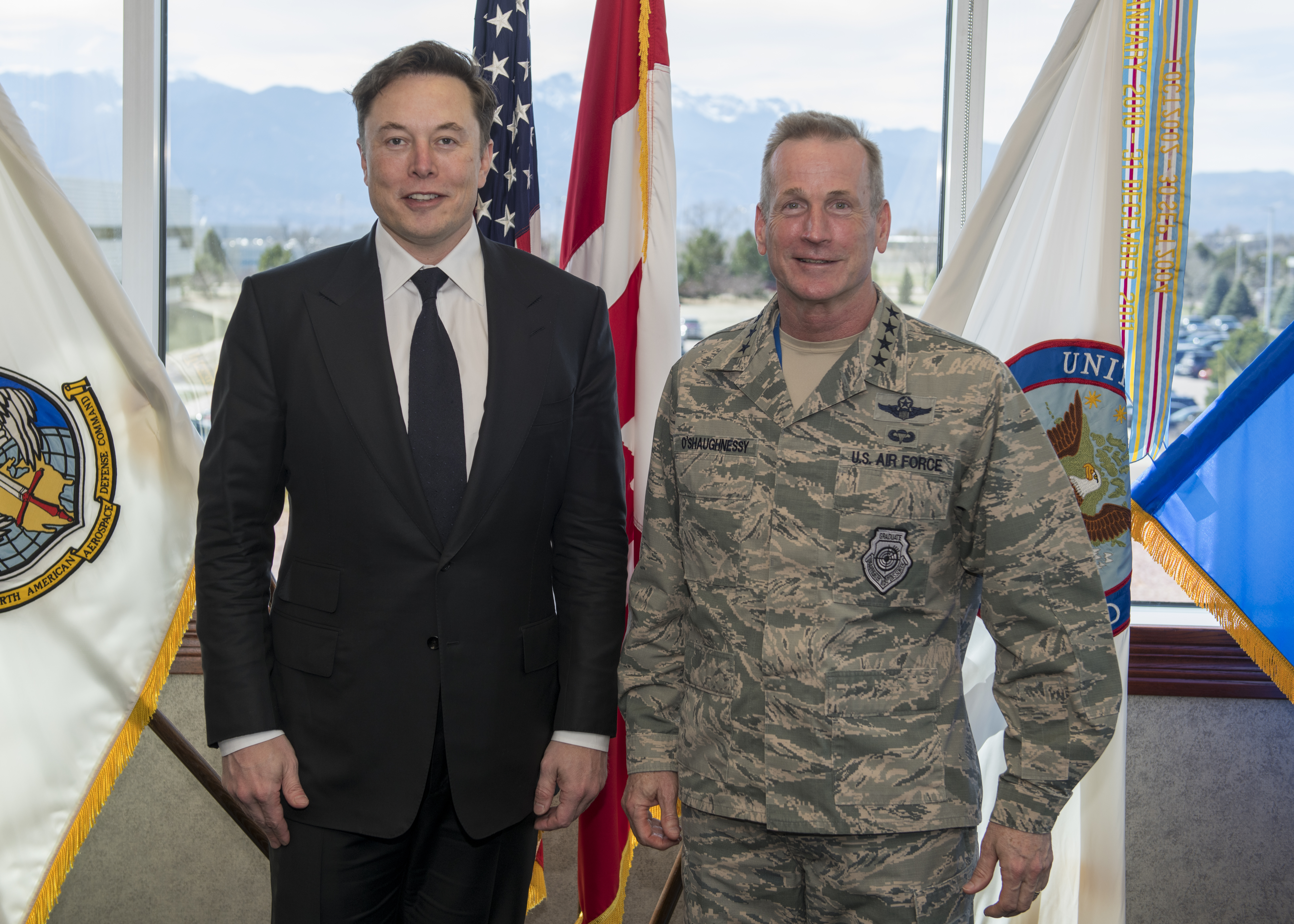
Elon Musk and retired four-star general Terrence J. O'Shaughnessy meet in April 2019

In October 2020, SDA awarded SpaceX an initial $150 million dual-use contract to develop 4 satellites to detect and track ballistic and hypersonic missiles. The first batch of satellites were originally scheduled to launch September 2022 to form part of the Tracking Layer Tranche 0 of the Space Force's National Defense Space Architecture. The launch was rescheduled multiple times but it eventually launched in April 2023.

In 2020, SpaceX hired previously retired four-star general Terrence J. O'Shaughnessy who according to some sources is associated with Starlink's military satellite development and according to one source is listed as a "chief operating officer" at SpaceX. While still in active duty, O'Shaughnessy advocated before the United States Senate Committee on Armed Services for a layered capability with lethal follow-on that incorporates machine learning and artificial intelligence to gather and act upon sensor data quickly. As of 2024, Terrence O’Shaughnessy reportedly has had a high-level role at Starshield.

SpaceX was not awarded a contract for the larger Tranche 1, with awards going to York Space Systems, Lockheed Martin Space, and Northrop Grumman Space Systems.

As Starlink was being relied on in the Russo-Ukrainian war, expert on battlefield communications Thomas Wellington argued that Starlink signals, because they use narrow focused beams, are less vulnerable to interference and jamming by the enemy in wartime than satellites flying in higher orbits. This technology is being used by the military and "can be integrated onto partner satellites to enable incorporation into the Starshield network." Therefore, if the military needed the use of SpaceX satellites through the Starshield program, SpaceX "currently has over 3,000 satellites in low Earth orbit that beam the signal back to users' receiver dishes."

Another Starshield contract was announced in September 2023, involving communications-focused services for U.S. Space Systems Command. This contract with the US Space Force plans to provide customized satellite communications for the military. This is under the Space Force's new "Proliferated Low Earth Orbit" program for LEO satellites, where Space Force will allocate initially up to $900 million worth of contracts over 10 years, with 16 vendors initially selected. In 2024 the program's ceiling was raised to $13 billion. The one-year Starshield contract was awarded on September 1, 2023. The contract is expected to support 54 mission partners across the Army, Navy, Air Force, and Coast Guard.

In February 2024, the United States House Select Committee on Strategic Competition between the United States and the Chinese Communist Party sent a letter to Elon Musk stating that the Starshield program was potentially in breach of contract for not providing access to U.S. troops stationed in Taiwan when "global access" was "possibly" required by the contract. SpaceX responded that they were in full compliance with their U.S. government contracts. SpaceX had notified the Select Committee a week earlier that they were misinformed, but the Select Committee "chose to contact media before seeking additional information [regarding Starshield military use in Taiwan]".

In the context of military communication satellites, Col. Eric Felt, director of space architecture at the office of the assistant secretary of the Air Force for space acquisition and integration, said that there are plans to acquire at least 100 Starshield-branded satellites for this purpose by 2029. He said that while the military is an active user of SpaceX's commercial Starlink service, they also want to take advantage of the company's dedicated Starshield product line. Clare Hopper, head of the Space Force's Commercial Satellite Communications Office (CSCO) stated that demand for Starlink's commercial service is "off the charts" and that currently all of their supported users are still using the commercial Starlink satellite constellation, but that the DoD has "unique service plans that contain privileged capabilities and features that are not available commercially".

Between 2025 and 2026, the British military purchased about 1,000 Starshield terminals, and about 500 Starlink terminals intended for welfare and training purposes. Reuters reported that the Starshield terminals cost between £4,000 and £7,000 each, and two monthly data plans were available for these terminals: £5,500 per five terabytes or £25,000 for unlimited data.

In October 2026, Johann Wadephul, the German federal minister of foreign affairs, stated that Germany was paying for Starshield connectivity for the Ukrainian military until April 2027.

On 14 October 2026, Musk said the Ukrainian military was using the US government owned and controlled Starshield system, not Starlink, and the recent change to restrict operational user terminals to those travelling at less than 100 mph (160 km/h) was a US government decision and not his decision. This restriction disabled a type of interceptor that targeted Russian jet-powered Shahed drones, according to Serhiy Beskrestnov, an adviser on military technology to Zelenskyy. However, on 24 October, Musk alleged that Ukraine had violated Starlink's terms of service by using the system for offensive drone strikes. SpaceX subsequently clarified in a letter to Congress that the changes were made to Starlink. Ukrainian officials denied that Starlink had been used for strikes on Russia, citing technical restrictions that prevented them from doing so.

== Space-to-ground signal ==
NPR reported in October 2025 that the Starshield network had begun sending unknown communications from the satellite constellation to targets on Earth in a downlink, transmitting data from space to land. The involved spectrum and signal range involved are normally reserved by international standards for uplinks, or sending data from land to space, violating International Telecommunication Union standards and risking harm to other satellites and their communications. The ongoing incident involving the classified American satellite constellation was discovered by a hobbyist astronomer in British Columbia. The unknown signals are all reported to be in the 2025–2110 MHz range.

== Launches ==
Between 2020 and March 2024, a dozen Starshield prototypes and operational satellites were launched on Falcon 9. Reuters reported that these satellites have never been acknowledged by SpaceX or the US government and remain classified.

Images were posted online of the two SpaceX-built Space Development Agency Tranche 0 Flight 1 Tracking Layer infrared imaging satellites that launched on 2 April 2023. After the launch of Starlink Group 7-16, only 20 of a batch of 22 starlink satellites were catalogued, and the remaining two were later designated as USA-350 and USA-351.

Starshield launches
| No. | Mission name or designation | Sat. ver. | COSPAR ID | Date and time, UTC | Launch site | Orbit | | Satellites | | Outcome | Customer |
| No. | Mission name or designation | Sat. ver. | COSPAR ID | Date and time, UTC | Launch site | Altitude | Orbital inclination | Deployed | Working | Outcome | Customer |
|---|---|---|---|---|---|---|---|---|---|---|---|
| – | USA 312-313 | v1 | 2020–101 | 19 December 2020; 14:00:00 | Kennedy, LC-39A | 540 km (340 mi) | 53° | 2 | 2 | Success | National Reconnaissance Office |
| – | USA 312-313 | Possibly launched on NROL-108 mission. Likely test Starshield satellites. | | | | | | | | | |
| 1 | USA 320-323 | v1.5 | 2022–002 | 13 January 2022; 15:25:38 | Cape Canaveral, SLC-40 | 525 km (326 mi) | 97.6° | 4 | 1 | Success | Unknown US Government Agency |
| 1 | USA 320-323 | Likely test versions or operational Starshield satellites. Part of Transporter-3 (SmallSat Rideshare Mission 3). | | | | | | | | | |
| 2 | USA 328-331 | v1.5 | 2022–064 | 19 June 2022; 04:27 | Cape Canaveral, SLC-40 | 535 km (332 mi) | 52° | 4 | 4 | Success | Unknown US Government Agency |
| 2 | USA 328-331 | Likely test versions or operational Starshield satellites. Launched with Globalstar-2 FM-15 (M087) mission. | | | | | | | | | |
| 3 | Tracking Layer (Tranche 0A) | v1.5 | 2023–050 | 2 April 2023; 14:29 | Vandenberg, SLC-4E | 951 km (591 mi) | 80.99° | 2 | 2 | Success | Space Development Agency |
| 3 | Tracking Layer (Tranche 0A) | Likely operational Starshield satellites. Hosts infrared payloads manufactured by Leidos. Launched with 8 York Space Systems-built Transport layer satellites on this mission. | | | | | | | | | |
| 4 | Tracking Layer (Tranche 0B) | v1.5 | 2023–133 | 2 September 2023; 14:25 | Vandenberg, SLC-4E | 951 km (591 mi) | 80.99° | 2 | 2 | Success | Space Development Agency |
| 4 | Tracking Layer (Tranche 0B) | Likely operational Starshield satellites. Hosts infrared payloads manufactured by Leidos. Launched with one York Space Systems-built and 10 Lockheed Martin/Tyvak Space Systems-built Transport layer satellites on this mission. | | | | | | | | | |
| 5 | USA 350-351 | v2 mini | 2024–050 | 19 March 2024, 02:28 | Vandenberg, SLC-4E | 525 km (326 mi) | 53.05° | 2 | 2 | Success | Unknown US Government Agency |
| 5 | USA 350-351 | Launched as a part of Starlink Group 7-16 mission. | | | | | | | | | |
| 6 | USA 354-374 | v2 mini | 2024–096 | 22 May 2024; 08:00 | Vandenberg, SLC-4E | 310 km (190 mi) | 69.7° | 21 | 21 | Success | National Reconnaissance Office |
| 6 | USA 354-374 | Launched as a part of NROL-146 mission. | | | | | | | | | |
| 7 | USA 375-395 | v2 mini | 2024–121 | 29 June 2024; 03:14 | Vandenberg, SLC-4E | 310 km (190 mi) | 69.7° | 21 | 21 | Success | National Reconnaissance Office |
| 7 | USA 375-395 | Launched as a part of NROL-186 mission. | | | | | | | | | |
| 8 | USA 400-420 | v2 mini | 2024–160 | 6 September 2024; 03:20 | Vandenberg, SLC-4E | 310 km (190 mi) | 70° | 21 | 21 | Success | National Reconnaissance Office |
| 8 | USA 400-420 | Launched as a part of NROL-113 mission. | | | | | | | | | |
| 9 | USA 421-437 | v2 mini | 2024–192 | 24 October 2024; 17:13 | Vandenberg, SLC-4E | 310 km (190 mi) | 70° | 17 | 17 | Success | National Reconnaissance Office |
| 9 | USA 421-437 | Launched as a part of NROL-167 mission. | | | | | | | | | |
| 10 | USA 438-439 | v2 mini | 2024–225 | 30 November 2024; 08:10 | Vandenberg, SLC-4E | 310 km (190 mi) | 70° | 2 | 2 | Success | National Reconnaissance Office |
| 10 | USA 438-439 | Launched as a part of NROL-126 mission with Starlink Group N-01 mission. | | | | | | | | | |
| 11 | USA 441-462 | v2 mini | 2024–243 | 17 December 2024; 13:19 | Vandenberg, SLC-4E | 310 km (190 mi) | 70° | 22 | 22 | Success | National Reconnaissance Office |
| 11 | USA 441-462 | Launched as a part of NROL-149 mission. | | | | | | | | | |
| 12 | USA 463-484 | v2 mini | 2025–005 | 10 January 2025; 03:53 | Vandenberg, SLC-4E | 310 km (190 mi) | 70° | 22 | 22 | Success | National Reconnaissance Office |
| 12 | USA 463-484 | Launched as a part of NROL-153 mission. | | | | | | | | | |
| 13 | USA 485-486 | v2 mini | 2025–014 | 21 January 2025, 05:24 | Kennedy, LC-39A | 310 km (190 mi) | 43° | 2 | 2 | Success | Unknown US Government Agency |
| 13 | USA 485-486 | Launched as a part of Starlink Group 13-1 mission. | | | | | | | | | |
| 14 | USA 487-497 | v2 mini (?) | 2025–058 | 21 March 2025; 06:49 | Vandenberg, SLC-4E | 310 km (190 mi) | 70° | 11 | 11 | Success | National Reconnaissance Office |
| 14 | USA 487-497 | Launched as a part of NROL-57 mission. Based on the number of gaps in the catalog it appears that this launch only deployed 11 payloads, likely indicating a larger Starshield version. | | | | | | | | | |
| 15 | USA 499-520 | v2 mini | 2025–071 | 12 April 2025; 12:25 | Vandenberg, SLC-4E | 310 km (190 mi) | 70° | 22 | 22 | Success | National Reconnaissance Office |
| 15 | USA 499-520 | Launched as a part of NROL-192 mission. | | | | | | | | | |
| 16 | USA 523-544 | v2 mini | 2025–079 | 19 April 2025; 12:47 | Vandenberg, SLC-4E | 310 km (190 mi) | 70° | 22 | 22 | Success | National Reconnaissance Office |
| 16 | USA 523-544 | Launched as a part of NROL-145 mission. First NRO Proliferated Architecture Mission launch in partnership with USSF under the NSSL Phase 3 Lane 1 contract. | | | | | | | | | |
| 17 | USA 549-550 | v2 mini | 2025–165 | 31 July 2025, 18:35 | Vandenberg, SLC-4E | 559 km (347 mi) | 97.6° | 2 | 2 | Success | Unknown US Government Agency |
| 17 | USA 549-550 | Launched as a part of Starlink Group 13-4 mission. | | | | | | | | | |
| 18 | USA 558-565 | v2 mini | 2025–189 | 22 September 2025; 17:38 | Vandenberg, SLC-4E | 310 km (190 mi) | 70° | 8 | 8 | Success | National Reconnaissance Office |
| 18 | USA 558-565 | Launched as a part of NROL-48 mission. | | | | | | | | | |
| 19 | USA 572-580 | v2 mini | 2026–011 | 17 January 2026; 04:39 | Vandenberg, SLC-4E | 310 km (190 mi) | 70° | 9 | 9 | Success | National Reconnaissance Office |
| 19 | USA 572-580 | Launched as a part of NROL-105 mission. | | | | | | | | | |
| 20 | USA 586-607 | v2 mini | 2026–103 | 12 May 2026; 02:13 | Vandenberg, SLC-4E | 310 km (190 mi) | 70° | 22 | 22 | Success | National Reconnaissance Office |
| 20 | USA 586-607 | Launched as a part of NROL-172 mission. | | | | | | | | | |
| 21 | USA 608-609 | v2 mini | 2026–126 | 7 June 2026, 04:24 | Vandenberg, SLC-4E | 535 km (332 mi) | 97.61° | 2 | 2 | Success | Unknown US Government Agency |
| 21 | USA 608-609 | Launched as a part of Starlink Group 17-43 mission. | | | | | | | | | |
| 22 | USA 610-618 | v2 mini | 2026–141 | 19 June 2026; 08:50 | Vandenberg, SLC-4E | 310 km (190 mi) | 70° | 22 | 22 | Success | National Reconnaissance Office |
| 22 | USA 610-618 | Launched as a part of NROL-179 mission. | | | | | | | | | |
| 23 | USA 620-642 | v2 mini | 2026–141 | 16 August 2026; 01:50 | Vandenberg, SLC-4E | 310 km (190 mi) | 70° | 23 | 23 | Success | United States Space Force |
| 23 | USA 620-642 | Launched as a part of mission codenamed, USSF-366 (SBST R-1), suspected to be part of the new Starshield-based Space Data Network Backbone. | | | | | | | | | |
| 24 | USA 644-666 | v2 mini | 2026–206 | 10 September 2026; 15:42 | Vandenberg, SLC-4E | 310 km (190 mi) | 70° | 23 | 23 | Success | United States Space Force |
| 24 | USA 644-666 | Launched as a part of mission codenamed, USSF-153 (SBST R-2), suspected to be part of the new Starshield-based Space Data Network Backbone. | | | | | | | | | |
| 25 | USA 668-684 | v2 mini | 2026–214 | 17 September 2026; 01:07 | Vandenberg, SLC-4E | 320 km (200 mi) | 80° | 17 | 17 | Success | United States Space Force |
| 25 | USA 668-684 | Launched as a part of mission codenamed, USSF-259 (SBST TH-1), suspected to be part of the new Starshield-based Space Data Network Backbone. | | | | | | | | | |
| 26 | USA 685-707 | v2 mini | 2026–224 | 26 September 2026; 14:00 | Vandenberg, SLC-4E | 320 km (200 mi) | 80° | 23 | 23 | Success | United States Space Force |
| 26 | USA 685-707 | Launched as a part of mission codenamed, USSF-385 (SBST R-3), suspected to be part of the new Starshield-based Space Data Network Backbone. | | | | | | | | | |
| 27 | USA 709-725 | v2 mini | 2026–235 | 16 October 2026; 00:01 | Vandenberg, SLC-4E | 320 km (200 mi) | 80° | 17 | 17 | Success | United States Space Force |
| 27 | USA 709-725 | Launched as a part of mission codenamed, USSF-481 (SBST TH-2), suspected to be part of the new Starshield-based Space Data Network Backbone. | | | | | | | | | |

== See also ==
- Golden Dome (missile defense system)
- Defense Satellite Communications System
- Militarisation of space
- Rocket Cargo, Other U.S. Space Force program involving SpaceX
- Starlink in the Russo-Ukrainian War
