= USSF-44 =

USSF technology demonstration satellite

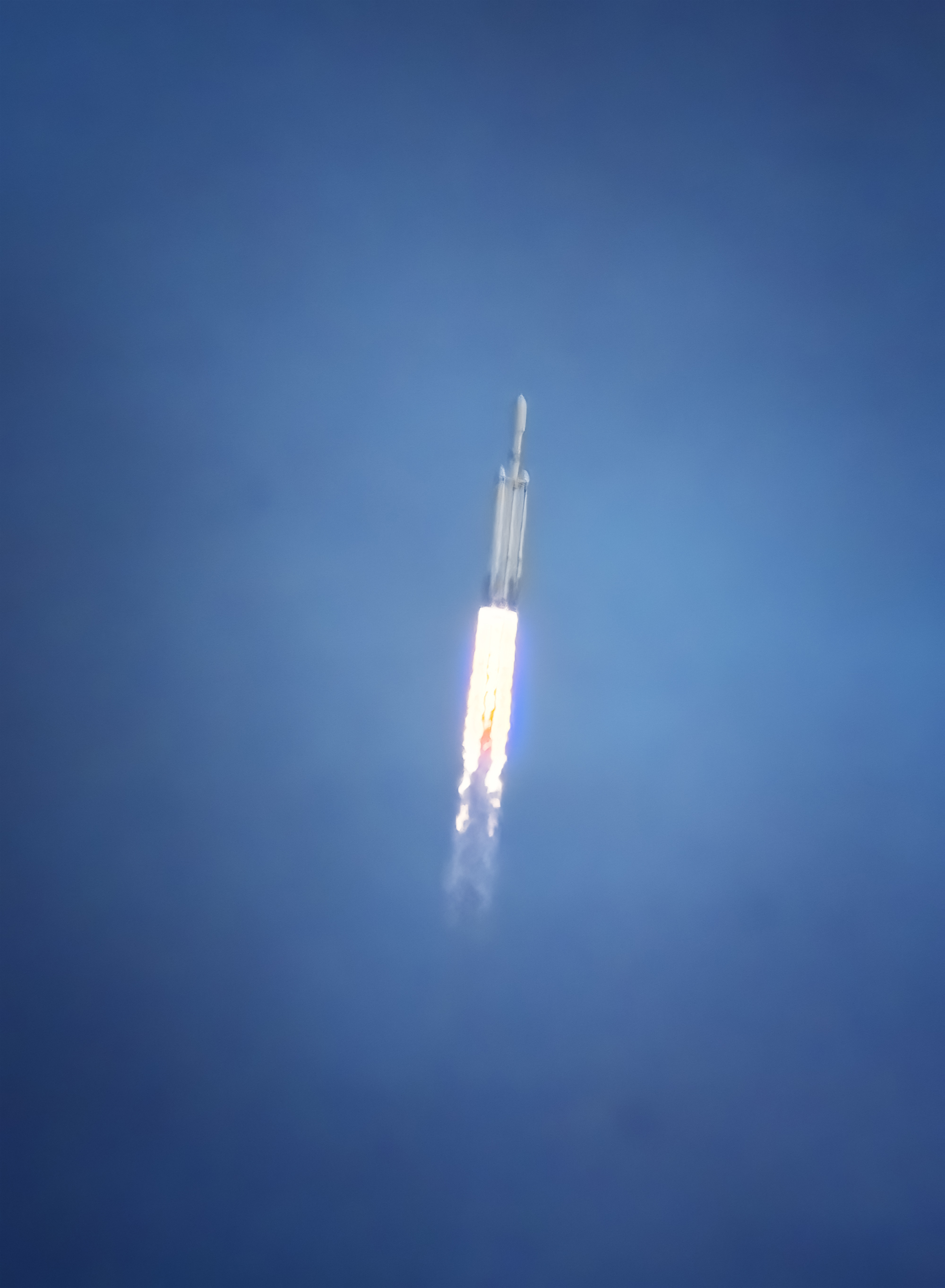
- USSF-44 mission launch
- Names: USSF-44; AFSPC-44 (former)
- Mission type: Technology demonstration
- Operator: United States Space Force

Spacecraft properties
- Power: Deployable solar array, batteries

Start of mission
- Launch date: November 1, 2022, 13:41 UTC
- Rocket: Falcon Heavy (FH-004)
- Launch site: Kennedy, LC-39A
- Contractor: SpaceX

Orbital parameters
- Regime: Geostationary
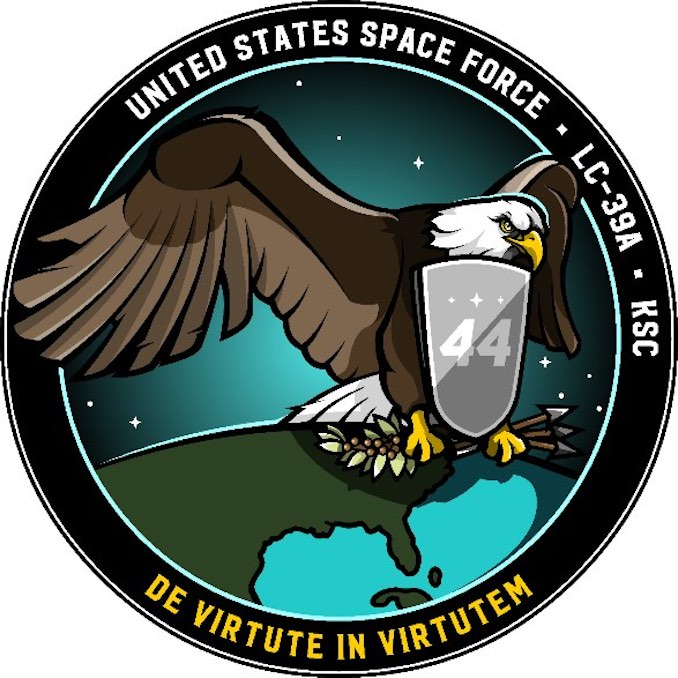
- Mission insignia USSF Launch

USSF-44 (formerly known as AFSPC-44) is an American National Security Space Launch mission operated by the United States Space Force. It is the first NSSL launch to use SpaceX's Falcon Heavy launch vehicle, and the first launch of the vehicle since 2019. After reaching orbit, three satellites were deployed: USA-339 (Shepard Demonstration), LDPE-2, USA-340 (Tetra-1), USA-341 (Alpine), LINUSS 1 and 2. Also launched were USA-344, deployed in January 2023; USA-399, deployed in August 2024; USA-546, deployed in early June 2025, with USA-547 and USA-548 deployed later that month; and USA-551, USA-552, and USA-553, all deployed in August 2025.

== Overview ==
=== Shepard Demonstration ===
USA-339 was launched on November 1, 2022, at 9:41 EST on board the rocket Falcon Heavy USSF-44 Mission.
