= List of USA satellites =

This is a list of satellites and spacecraft that have been given USA designations by the United States Air Force. This list has been split into groups of 500 satellites:

- List of USA satellites (1-500)
- List of USA satellites (501-1000)
