= Integrate-Transfer-Launch Complex =

Historic military launch site at Cape Canaveral

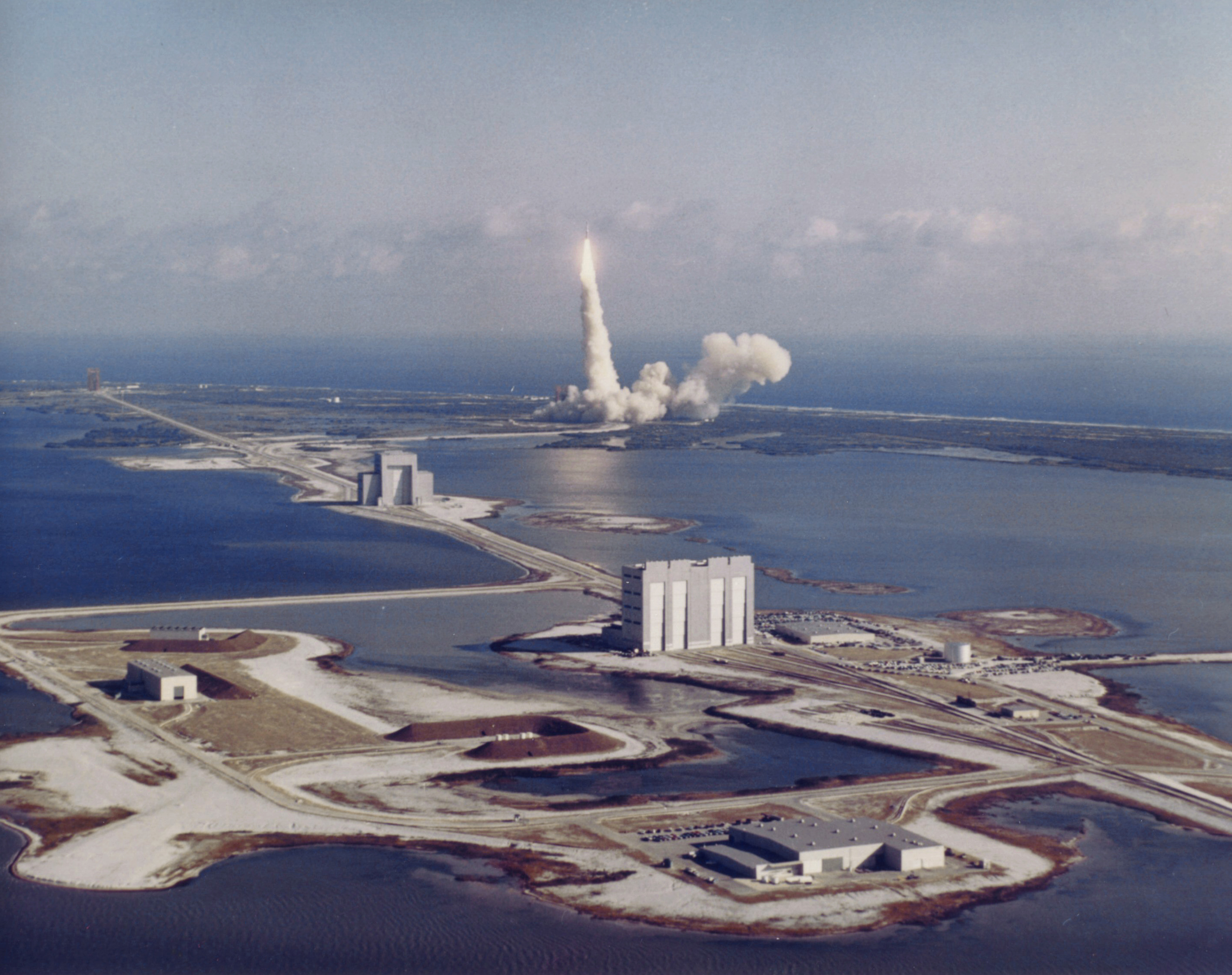
- The ITL in 1966, showing the launch of OPS 0855 from LC-40.
- Interactive map of Integrate-Transfer-Launch Complex
- Location: Cape Canaveral Space Force Station
- Coordinates: 28°32′54.7″N 80°35′24″W
- Time zone: UTC−05:00 (EST)
  - Summer (DST): UTC−04:00 (EDT)
- Short name: ITL
- Established: 1961; 65 years ago
- Operator: Owner: United States Space Force; Tenants: SpaceX (SLC-40, LZ-40, SMAB); United Launch Alliance (SLC-41, VIF-A. VIF-G)
- Total launches: 528 (36 Titan IIIC, 7 Titan IIIE, 8 Titan 34D, 4 Commercial Titan III, 27 Titan IV, 92 Atlas V, 348 Falcon 9, 5 Vulcan Centaur)
- Launch pad: 2, plus 1 Falcon booster landing zone
- Orbital inclination range: 28°–62°
Pad 40 launch history
- Status: Active
- Launches: 403 (26 Titan IIIC, 8 Titan 34D, 4 Commercial Titan III, 17 Titan IV, 348 Falcon 9)
- First launch: 18 June 1965; Titan IIIC
- Last launch: 20 October 2026; Falcon 9 Block 5 (Bandwagon-5)
- Associated rockets: Current: Falcon 9 Retired: Titan IIIC, Titan 34D, Commercial Titan III, Titan IV; Plans cancelled: Titan IIIM
Pad 41 launch history
- Status: Active
- Launches: 125 (10 Titan IIIC, 7 Titan IIIE, 10 Titan IV, 92 Atlas V, 5 Vulcan)
- First launch: 21 December 1965; Titan IIIC (LES-3 and 4)
- Last launch: 15 November 2026; Vulcan Centaur (LeoSat LV-01)
- Associated rockets: Current: Vulcan, Atlas V Retired: Titan IIIC, Titan IIIE, Titan IV
Pad 42 launch history
- Status: Never built
- Launches: 0
- Associated rockets: Intended: Titan IIIC
LZ-40 landing history
- Status: Active
- Landings: 8 (6 Falcon 9, 2 Falcon Heavy)
- First landing: 13 February 2026; Falcon 9 Block 5 (SpaceX Crew-12)
- Last landing: 13 October 2026; Falcon 9 Block 5 (SpaceX CRS-35)
- Associated rockets: Current: Falcon 9, Falcon Heavy

The Integrate-Transfer-Launch Complex (ITL) is a rocket launch site located at Cape Canaveral Space Force Station in Florida. Situated on the northern end of the Banana River, the complex and its various components were originally constructed by the United States Air Force for the Titan III program, and was later modified for use by the Titan IV. The ITL's design is similar to that of Launch Complex 39 at the neighboring Kennedy Space Center, where it consists of two launch pads at Space Launch Complex 40 (SLC-40) and Space Launch Complex 41 (SLC-41), as well as a Vertical Integration Building (VIB), a Solid Motor Assembly Building (SMAB), and a Solid Motor Assembly Readiness Facility (SMARF), all connected by rail.

Following the retirement of the Titan family in 2005, the Air Force and the United States Space Force have divided the ITL between two private spaceflight companies in the processing and launch of their rockets. SpaceX currently leases SLC-40 in the integration, launch, and landing of their reusable Falcon 9, and additionally uses the SMAB to encapsulate any of their payloads. Meanwhile, SLC-41 has been used by the Boeing-Lockheed Martin joint venture United Launch Alliance (ULA) to launch the Atlas V and Vulcan Centaur. For the assembly of these rockets, the Government Vertical Integration Facility (VIF-G) was constructed for both vehicles, and the SMARF was renamed to the Amazon Vertical Integration Facility (VIF-A) for Vulcan.

Early on, a third launch pad was planned to be constructed at the ITL, to be designated Launch Complex 42 (LC-42). However, the envisioned location west of the facility led to proximity issues with Launch Complex 39A, which resulted in LC-42 never being built.

== History ==
=== Background and construction (1961–1964) ===
 During the late 1950s, the United States Air Force began to explore replacing their first two ICBMs, General Dynamics' SM-65 Atlas and the Glenn L. Martin Company's HGM-25A Titan I. Although the two have been made serviceable enough to warrant deployment in various bases across the country, they both suffered greatly from using RP-1 and liquid oxygen as fuel. As the liquid oxygen was a cryogenic propellant, both the Atlas and Titan were forced to load their fuel immediately between initial activation and launch, massively lengthening readiness times. What resulted was the development of the LGM-25C Titan II by Martin Marietta, which replaced the RP-1 and LOX with Aerozine 50 and dinitrogen tetroxide, hypergolic propellant that could be stored for long periods of time and eliminated the need for an ignition fluid.

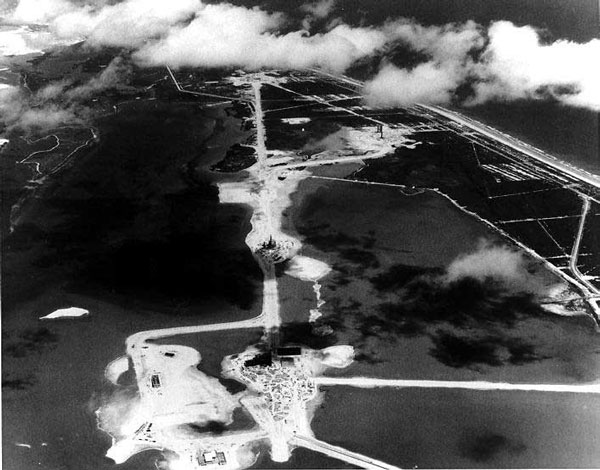
The ITL Complex under construction in 1964.

The Titan II was designated as the new primary ICBM in the Air Force's arsenal during the 1960s, being deployed into numerous silos across the United States.

However, this period did not last; the simultaneously developed LGM-30 Minuteman quickly won the Air Force and Kennedy administration's favor in part thanks to its solid fuel compared to the Titan II's toxic hypergols. Although it was not officially retired due to its large size and throw weight, the Titan II was nonetheless demoted to a secondary role and led to a large scale reduction in deployment.

With the new influx of missiles getting mothballed, the Titan II started seeing a second life as a launch vehicle. Although there were previous proposals for such use in the past, the missile began to have concrete plans for space launch getting made, primarily with Project Gemini for NASA (as the Titan II GLV) and the Air Force's X-20 Dyna Soar. Additionally, representatives from both NASA and the Department of Defense formed the Large Launch Vehicle Planning Group (LLVPG), which aimed to use the LGM-25C as the base architecture for a medium-lift launch vehicle designed for putting objects with a mass greater than 10,000 kg into low Earth orbit. The plan called for the Titan II to have the Transtage third stage added on top for the boosting of payloads into geostationary transfer orbit, as well as two large segmented solid rocket boosters (SRBs) attached to the missile's sides. Additionally, as existing Titan II launch sites at Cape Canaveral (such as Launch Complex 19) could not support these modifications, the LLVPG instead proposed to construct an entirely new site where these rockets would get assembled and launched, similar to the planned Saturn V at the nearby Launch Complex 39 of the Launch Operations Center.

In 1961, The LLVPG's medium-lift Titan plan was accepted for use by the Air Force, and development of the Integrate-Transfer-Launch Complex commenced on November 24, 1962. As part of the construction process, a total of 4.97 million cubic meters (6.5 million cubic yards) were dredged in order to create artificial islands in the Banana River that could support the complex's integration facilities. Additionally, the Titan IIIC Railroad was laid to assist in the transportation of the solid rocket segments and other vehicle parts to the assembly buildings, connecting to the Florida East Coast Railway via the NASA Railroad to the north.

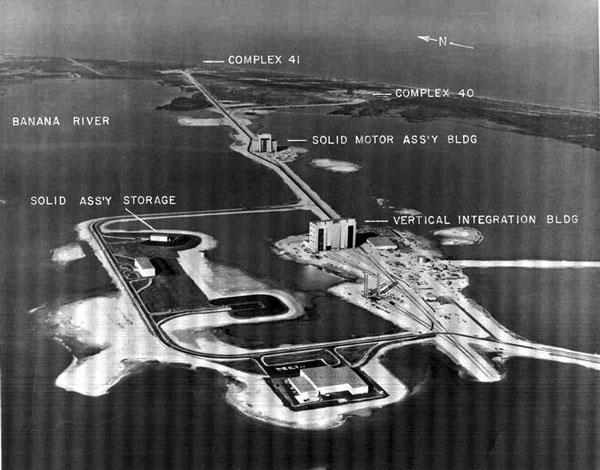
Overall layout of the ITL complex.

The Air Force also had the ITL designed to allow for the rapid assembly and launching of Titan rockets, aiming for it to be able to handle as many as fifty flights per year. As part of this endeavor, early plans for the complex included the construction of a third pad to the west of LC-40 and 41, aptly named Launch Complex 42. However, concerns arose regarding LC-42's placement potentially conflicting with Launch Complex 39C (now LC-39A) at the newly-renamed Kennedy Space Center, ultimately leading to its cancellation in favor of increased use from LC-40 and 41. The emphasis on cadence was especially made prominent following the 1963 establishment of the Manned Orbiting Laboratory (MOL) program, which replaced Dyna Soar with a Gemini-based vehicle architecture. During this change, the X-20 Titan pad of Launch Complex 33 was cancelled (cemented by LC-37 being built in place), with any MOL flights being performed at the ITL and Space Launch Complex 6 at Vandenberg Air Force Base.

By April 1965, construction of the ITL Complex was officially completed and made ready to support the Titan III program and the Titan IIIC. In total, approximately US$48.8 million ($512.4 million in 2025) were used in the issuing of building contracts.

=== Titan III (1965–1989) ===
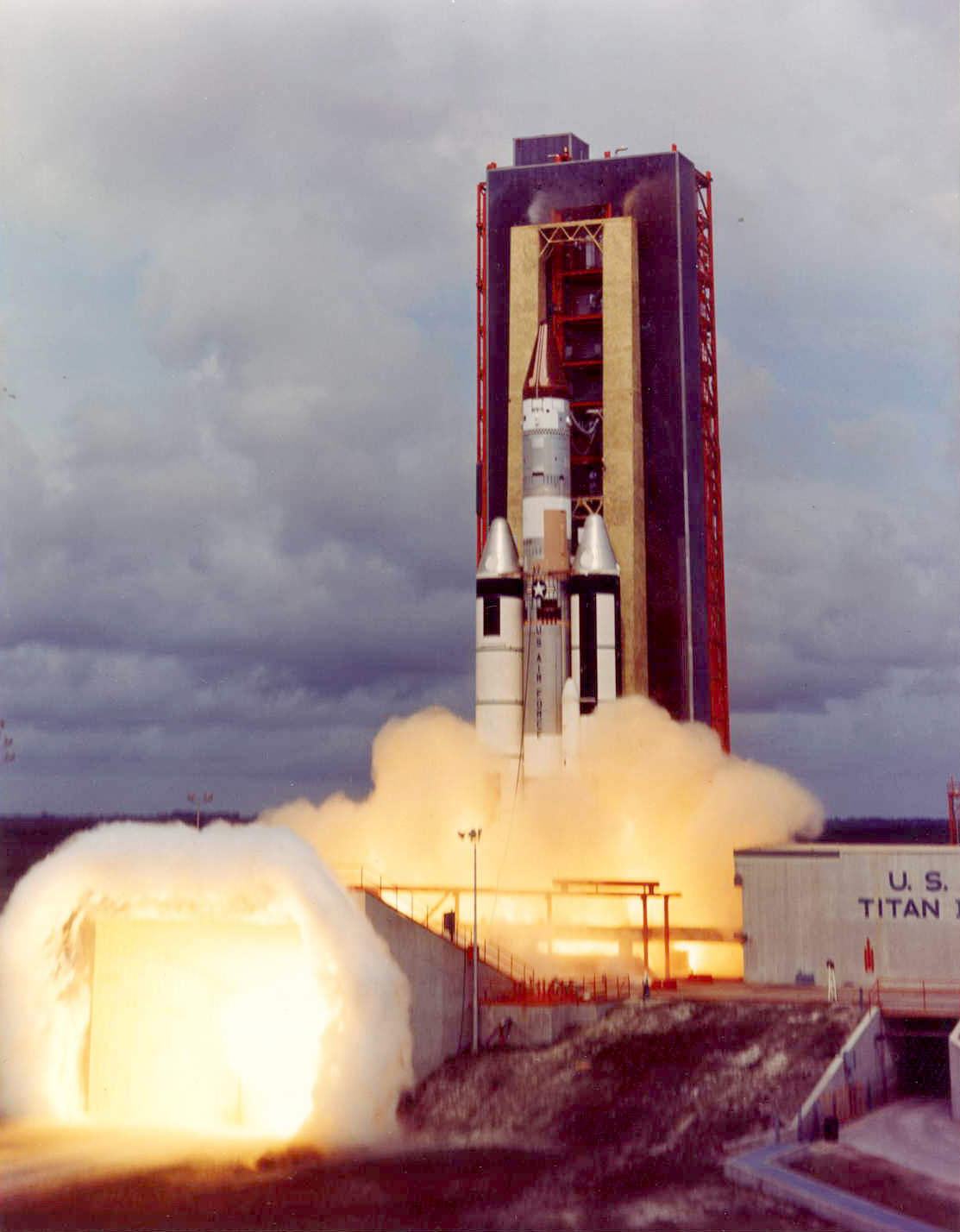
A Titan IIIC carrying several IDCSP satellites launches from LC-41 in June 1966.

At the time of its activation in 1965, the ITL Complex became the first piece of launch architecture to use a rolling-to-pad approach, later seen at sites such as LC-39 at KSC, ELA-3 at the Guiana Space Centre, and LA-Y at the Tanegashima Space Center. The assembly process started at the Vertical Integration Building (VIB), where the Titan's first stage, second stage, and Transtage were raised and stacked on a mobile launch platform, inside one of the VIB's four high bays. The core stack, similar in structure to the Titan IIIA, would then get moved to the Solid Motor Assembly Building (SMAB) by a double-tracked railway system specifically designed for the MLP. Once inside the SMAB, the various solid rocket segments would get fueled, stacked into two completed SRBs, and attached to the side of the core segment. Upon completion, the Titan IIIC would exit the SMAB and get transported to either Launch Complex 40 (LC-40) or Launch Complex 41 (LC-41), both identical in their layout and function. After arriving at one of the two pads, the launch vehicle would get enveloped in a movable service structure, where the payload and any potential kickstage would get attached to the rocket and encapsulated in a fairing. Once done, the service structure moves back, the Titan core stages get fueled, and the launch countdown begins.

On June 18, 1965, the ITL Complex witnessed its inaugural launch with the maiden flight of the Titan IIIC, launching out of LC-40 and carrying a boilerplate payload as part of a demonstration mission. The first flight from LC-41 came six months later on December 21, flying with two Lincoln Experimental Satellites bound for geostationary orbit. Throughout the complex's years with the Titan III, the vast majority of payloads launched were military satellites such as Vela, the Initial Defense Communications Satellite Program (IDCSP), and the Defense Support Program (DSP), often flown in rideshares or outside of low Earth orbit. In addition, most civilian Titan flights from the ITL were boosted into heliocentric orbit, often to other planets as part of various NASA exploration programs.

The first notable flight to come out of the complex was on November 3, 1966, with the launch of OPS 0855 from LC-40. A launch conducted as part of the MOL program, a boilerplate payload—comprising the reused Gemini SC-2 capsule (previously flown on Gemini 2) and a repurposed Titan I oxidizer tank—was launched into orbit. The flight served as a demonstration for a future operational mission that would have used the upgraded Titan IIIM, which aimed to use a stretched core stage (later seeing use with some Titan IIIB variations) and to replace the IIIC's five-segment UA120 boosters with seven-segment UA1207s. OPS 0855 would later turn out to be the only launch of the MOL program, as various delays and cost increases associated with the Vietnam War ultimately led to its cancellation by the Nixon administration in 1969.

In accordance with the troubles that plagued and killed off the MOL, the need for the ITL Complex to support such a high cadence quickly faded away, with the Air Force instead aiming for a much lower flight rate of five launches per year. As such, the need to use both pads 40 and 41 was similarly discarded, with all remaining Titan IIIC flights in the 1960s solely launching from LC-41. In 1970, these launches were relocated to LC-40, with the final Titan IIIC flight from 41 occurring on May 23, 1969, carrying two Vela satellites into medium Earth orbit. One of these satellites, OPS-6911, later became known for detecting a double flash in the southwest Indian Ocean in 1979, sparking the Vela incident.

During the early 1970s, the Air Force and NASA partnered in modifying the ITL in order to support a civilian-oriented Titan rocket, the Titan IIIE. This launch vehicle was born in need of a rocket more powerful than Atlas-Centaur to launch interplanetary spacecraft, which was made much more necessary following the expected retirement of the Saturn family with the conclusion of the Apollo Program and Apollo Applications Program. Using a cryogenic Centaur upper stage in place of the Transtage, the Titan IIIE complemented the IIIC’s operations at the complex by utilizing one of the VIB’s high bays for core assembly and launching from LC-41. The maiden flight of the rocket (and first civilian launch from the ITL Complex in general) occurred on February 11, 1974, carrying the Sphinx test satellite for NASA into space before a turbopump malfunction on the Centaur engaged range safety protocols.

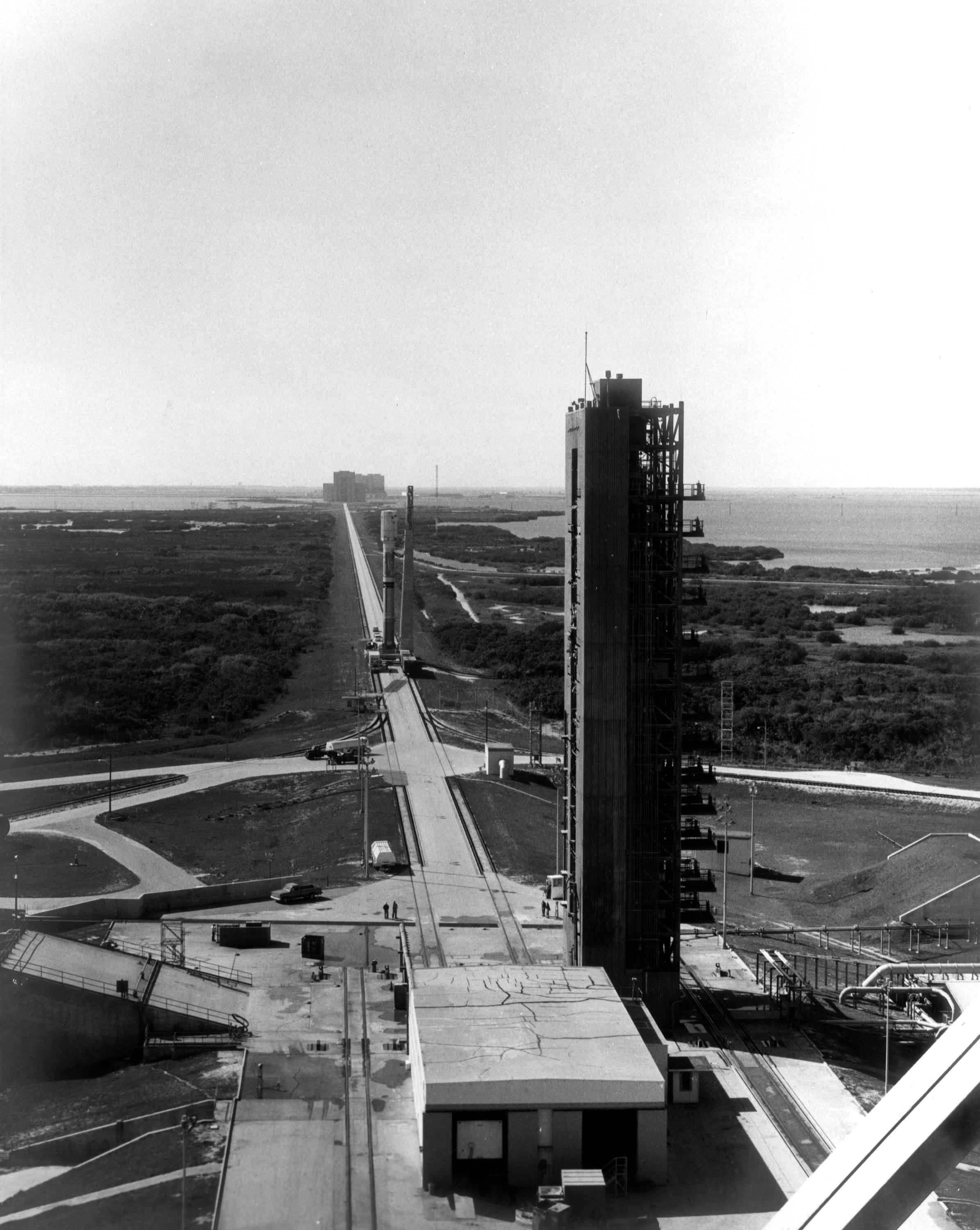
The Titan IIIE to be used for Viking 2 in February 1975, rolling from LC-41 to the VIB for storage.

Over the next three years, the Titan IIIE launched six more times from the ITL Complex, each flight carrying its payloads into heliocentric orbit. The first of these spacecraft was Helios-A in December 1974, which was a heliophysics-centered probe that became the first to travel inside Mercury's orbit. It was later complemented with its sister Helios-B in January 1976, which set a proximity record to the Sun that stood until the Parker Solar Probe's launch more than 40 years later in 2018. Following this, the two spacecraft of the Viking program launched from LC-41 for Mars in the summer of 1975, during which Viking 1 became the first spacecraft to successfully operate on the Martian surface. Lastly, the Voyager program took off using the final two IIIE flights in 1977, aiming at exploring the four outer planets using an alignment that occurs once every 175 years. Voyager 2 launched first in August, later becoming the first spacecraft to visit Uranus and Neptune, while Voyager 1 used the IIIE's last launch in September to become the furthest artificial object from Earth.

Following the TItan IIIE's retirement, use of the ITL Complex slowed going into the 1980s, largely as a result of the nascent Space Shuttle program operated by NASA with DoD input. The philosophy the prevailed at this time was that since the Space Shuttle was designed to be both reusable and able to service payloads in-orbit, the need for more expensive conventional rockets such as the Titan family would dwindle and they would eventually be retired. Despite this, the ITL remained in service with the introduction of the Titan 34D, designed to replace the IIIC and the Vandenberg-only Titan IIID. Due to these changes, the VIB and the SMAB were given minor modifications to support the new launch vehicle, on account of the lengthened SRBs and core stage as well as the option to support the Inertial Upper Stage (IUS) and Transfer Orbit Stage (TOS). The maiden flight of the 34D occurred on October 30, 1982 from LC-40, seven months after the IIIC's final flight and carrying two Defense Satellite Communications System satellites. Like its predecessor, the Titan 34D's time at the ITL was entirely performed with military payloads aboard, flying eight times from 1982 to its retirement in 1988.

=== Commercial Titan III and Titan IV (1990–2005) ===
During the mid-1980s, in response to concerns regarding the Space Shuttle's reliability with military payloads, the National Reconnaissance Office (NRO) under Director and Air Force Under Secretary Pete Aldridge approved the development of the Complementary Expendable Launch Vehicle in order to assist the Shuttle with payloads of national security. Later renamed the Titan IV, it was initially planned to fly only a handful of missions from LC-41, with the expectation that it would be swiftly retired once the Space Shuttle was flying at a satisfactory rate according to the DoD. These plans were hastily discarded following the Space Shuttle Challenger disaster on January 28, 1986, with the failure of STS-51-L creating an immediate shift to uncrewed launch vehicles for military and commercial payloads and a rapid expansion of the Titan IV program. Additionally, Martin Marietta used the new need for a commercial launcher to start developing the Commercial Titan III, using proposals for a Titan 34D successor to instead support civilian Titan launches. As a result, a renewed focus was given to the ITL by the Air Force and Martin Marietta in order for it to support this next generation.

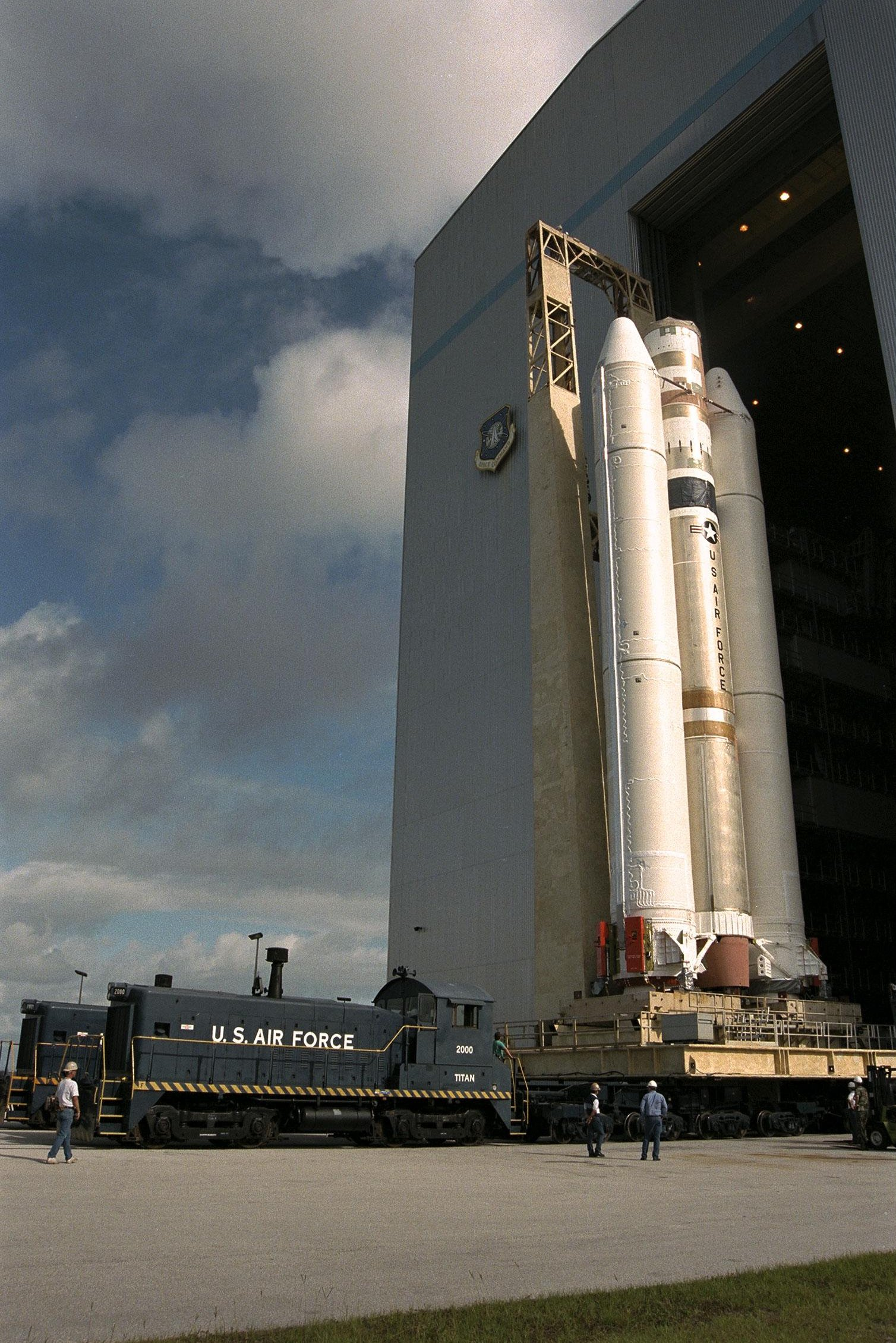
The Titan IV to be used for Cassini–Huygens departing the SMARF in May 1997.

In preparation of this new phase, the ITL underwent a series of modifications in order to support the two upcoming launch vehicles. The plans called for the facility to be split in responsibility similarly to its 1970s configuration: LC-40 would be used for the civilian launches of the Commercial Titan III, while LC-41 would get reactivated to support the Titan IV's military objectives. As the SMAB was incapable of handling the larger UA-1207 and SRMU solid-fuel boosters, the decision was made to forgo an expensive renovation of the building and for Titan IV cores to instead bypass it for the Solid Motor Assembly and Readiness Facility (SMARF), a newly-constructed building located to the north. The Titan III facility would not go unused however, as the Commercial Titan III's similarity to the 34D allowed it to continue its part in integration. The new era of use was officially christened on June 14, 1989 with the Titan IV's maiden flight, carrying a Defense Support Program satellite for the Air Force. It was followed by the maiden Commercial Titan III launch on January 1, 1990 carrying Skynet 4A and JCSAT-2.

Contrary to Martin Marietta's hopes, this new configuration for the ITL would prove to not last. The Commercial Titan III struggled to acquire customers due to its expensive price compared to competitors, with procurement instead being made to cheaper launch vehicles like the Delta II, Ariane 4, and newly-available Russian ones like Proton. This eventually helped lead to the rocket being retired in 1992, only being launched four times; regardless, it nonetheless managed to launch two notable payloads, being Intelsat 603 on March 14, 1990 (during which a stage separation failure left it stranded in LEO, leading to Space Shuttle Endeavour visiting it on STS-49) and Mars Observer on September 25, 1992 (which ultimately failed en route to the titular planet). Following the retirement, the SMAB was deactivated and LC-40 was given further modifications in order to support Titan IV launches, serving its first one on February 7, 1994 with a Milstar satellite.

Much like previous configurations, the ITL's cadence during the Titan IV era remained low, averaging from two to three launches per year throughout the 1990s. Additionally, as the Transtage was put into retirement alongside the Titan 34D, a new assortment of third stage options were integrated at the pads, utilizing either an IUS, a Centaur (as a replacement for the cancelled Shuttle-Centaur), or having the payload directly attached to the second stage. Almost every launch of the Titan IV from the complex carried a military payload, most of them confidential, such as Orion and Satellite Data System probes. However, there was one major exception that broke the trend: that of Cassini–Huygens, being the only launch from the ITL during this period that was of a civilian nature, having involvement from a non-American customer, and having a destination beyond GEO. Taking off from LC-40 on October 15, 1997, the joint NASA-ESA spacecraft utilized the lifting capability of a Titan IV to become the first to orbit Saturn (and its Huygens lander became the first spacecraft to land on Titan), required as a result of its large size and use of radioisotope thermoelectric generators (RTGs).

While the Titan IV was seen as an improvement over the Space Shuttle in some metrics, it was still ultimately considered expensive, old, and unreliable. By the 1990s, there were also growing safety concerns over its toxic fuel used since the ICBM days, further prompting the need for a replacement. Originally, drafts for a Titan V were discussed, with proposed changes including switching to using cryogenic propellants and an ability to place 41,000 kg (90,000 lbs) into LEO. However, it was ultimately decided to retire the Titan family as a whole in favor for the cheaper selections of the Evolved Expendable Launch Vehicle (EELV) program. LC-41 was retired first, hosting its last Titan flight on April 9, 1999 with a DSP satellite, with all remaining future launches launching from LC-40. The last Titan IV launch from the ITL was on April 30, 2005, carrying a Lacrosse reconnaissance satellite, marking the penultimate launch of a Titan rocket. (Note: The last Titan launch occurred on October 19, 2005 from SLC-4E at Vandenberg Air Force Base, carrying a KH-11 KENNEN reconnaissance satellite.) The Titan-specific equipment was dismantled soon after, with the Vertical Integration Building being demolished in 2006.

=== Post-Titan usage (2002–present) ===
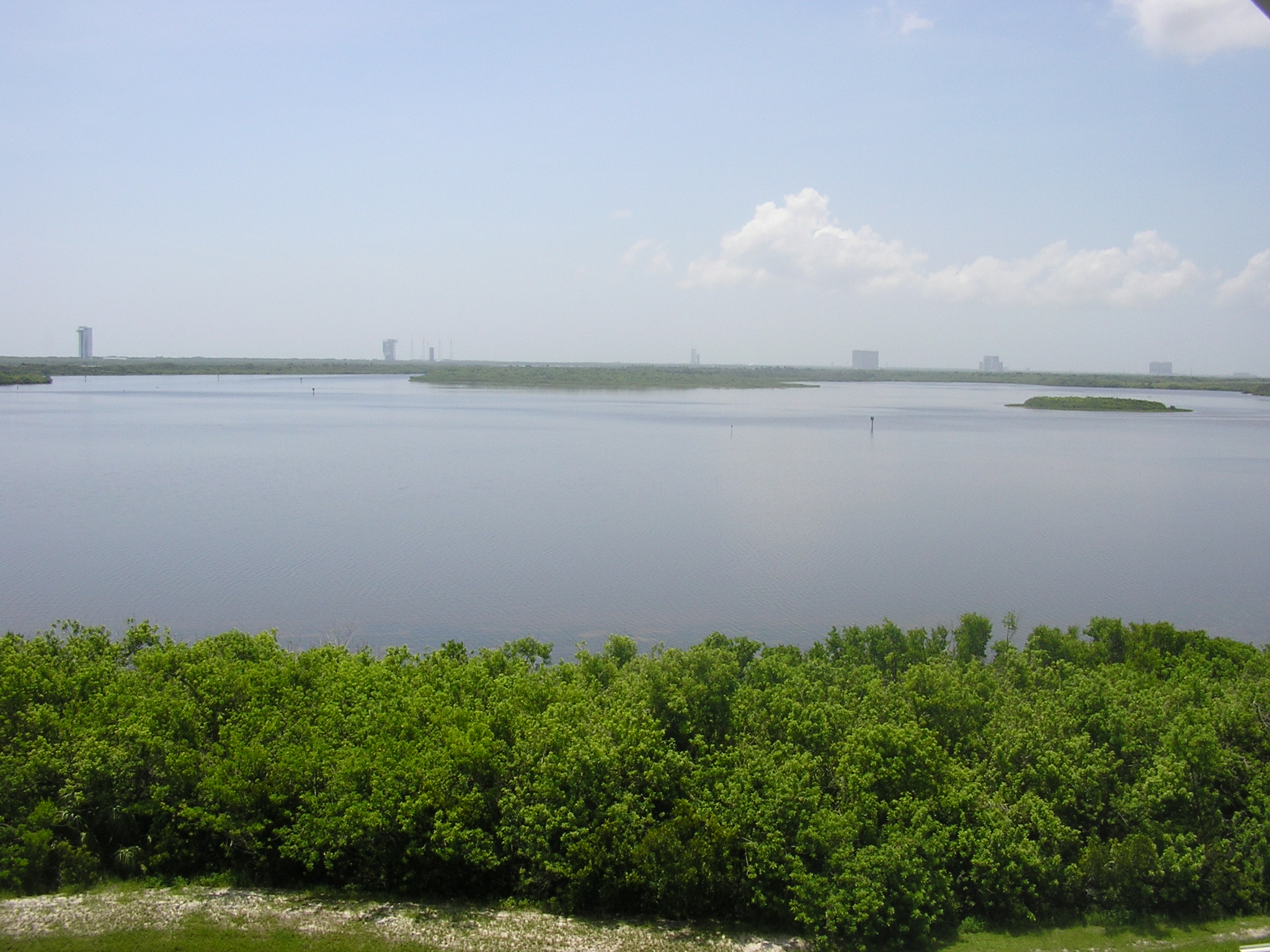
The ITL in 2005, as taken from the Crawlerway. From left to right: the VIF, LC-40, SLC-37, the SMARF, the SMAB, and the VIB.

Even before the Titan program ended, there were already plans for a new role for the ITL complex. LC-41 was retired earlier, to be leased by Lockheed Martin for their Atlas V rocket. As part of the conversion (and since the other ITL buildings were still in use at the time), a new VIF was built closer to the launch pad. The first flight from the modified LC-41 (renamed to Space Launch Complex 41) was in 2002, with an Atlas V 401 carrying Hotbird 6. Aside from military launches as part of the EELV program, Atlas V from SLC-41 was also used for various interplanetary launches, like the Curiosity and Perseverance rovers, or the New Horizons Pluto probe. It also served as the launch site for the X-37B military spaceplane.

Two years after the last Titan launch, in 2007, LC-40 was renamed to Space Launch Complex 40, and leased to SpaceX for their Falcon 9 rocket. This pad also had its Titan-legacy equipment torn down, and replaced by a clean pad and a horizontal integration facility. First Falcon 9 launch took place in 2010. In 2016, a fueled Falcon 9 with the AMOS-6 satellite on top exploded on pad, causing significant damage.

After SpaceX's lease of Launch Complex 39A and the start of their participation in the Commercial Crew Program, SLC-40 was dedicated to unmanned launches. At roughly the same time, SLC-41 received a new launch tower, to be used with the Boeing Starliner. It was first used during uncrewed tests in 2019 and 2022, and the crewed flight test in 2024.

After the Russian annexation of Crimea, the use of Russian RD-180 engines on Atlas V (now operated jointly by Lockheed Martin and Boeing as the United Launch Alliance) started proving politically problematic. In response, ULA accelerated their plans for a new rocket that would replace both the Atlas V and the Delta IV, later named Vulcan. It made its first launch in 2024, carrying the Peregrine lander.

In October 2023, SpaceX added a new launch tower to SLC-40, to serve as a backup to their crew launch site on LC-39A, first used in March 2024 for the CRS-30 mission. (Note: The first time it was used with astronauts was with Crew-9 in September 2024.) In 2025, they announced as part of the Crew-11 press conference that they were planning to add a Falcon booster landing pad to SLC-40, to free up the existing landing zone areas for other uses. This new pad, designated Landing Zone 40 (LZ-40), began construction in September 2025 and saw its first use during the launch of Crew-12 in February 2026.

== Infrastructure ==
=== Space Launch Complex 40 ===
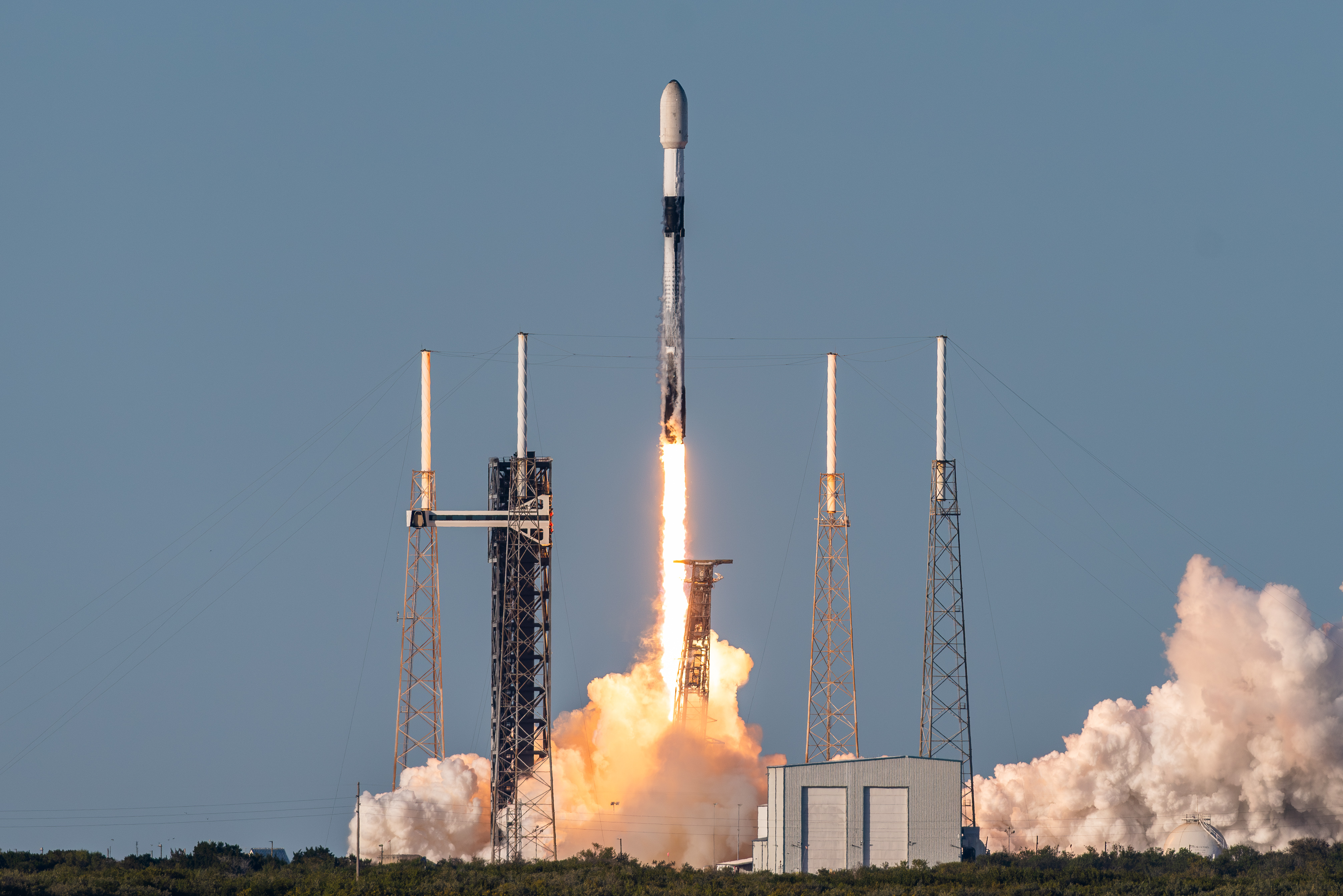
SLC-40 in February 2024, launching a Falcon 9 on a Starlink mission.

Space Launch Complex 40 (SLC-40) is located to the eastern side of the ITL at the end of Centaur Road, currently leased by SpaceX for use with the Falcon 9 rocket. Originally known as Launch Complex 40 (LC-40), it was built and initially used for launching Titan IIIC, Titan 34D, Commercial Titan III, and Titan IV.

During the Titan III era, the launch infrastructure at the pad consisted of a launch tower for the fueling of liquid propellants and a mobile service structure for the vertical integration of payloads. As part of modifications made in anticipation for the Titan IV, four lightning towers were additionally constructed along its outside peripheries. Following the Titan family's retirement in 2005, most of the Titan infrastructure was demolished by SpaceX, and a horizontal integration facility for Falcon 9 was built on Centaur Road over the former railroad tracks. During SLC-40's early period under Falcon 9, it was rendered nonoperational for a year following the AMOS-6 explosion in 2016.

In October 2023, a new launch tower was added, to serve the Dragon 2 spacecraft. In September 2025, SpaceX cleared adjacent land east of the pad to create Landing Zone 40 (LZ-40), a new Falcon booster landing zone to replace for Landing Zones 1 and 2 at Launch Complex 13. It was used for the first time on February 13, 2026 during the launch of SpaceX Crew-12.

=== Space Launch Complex 41 ===
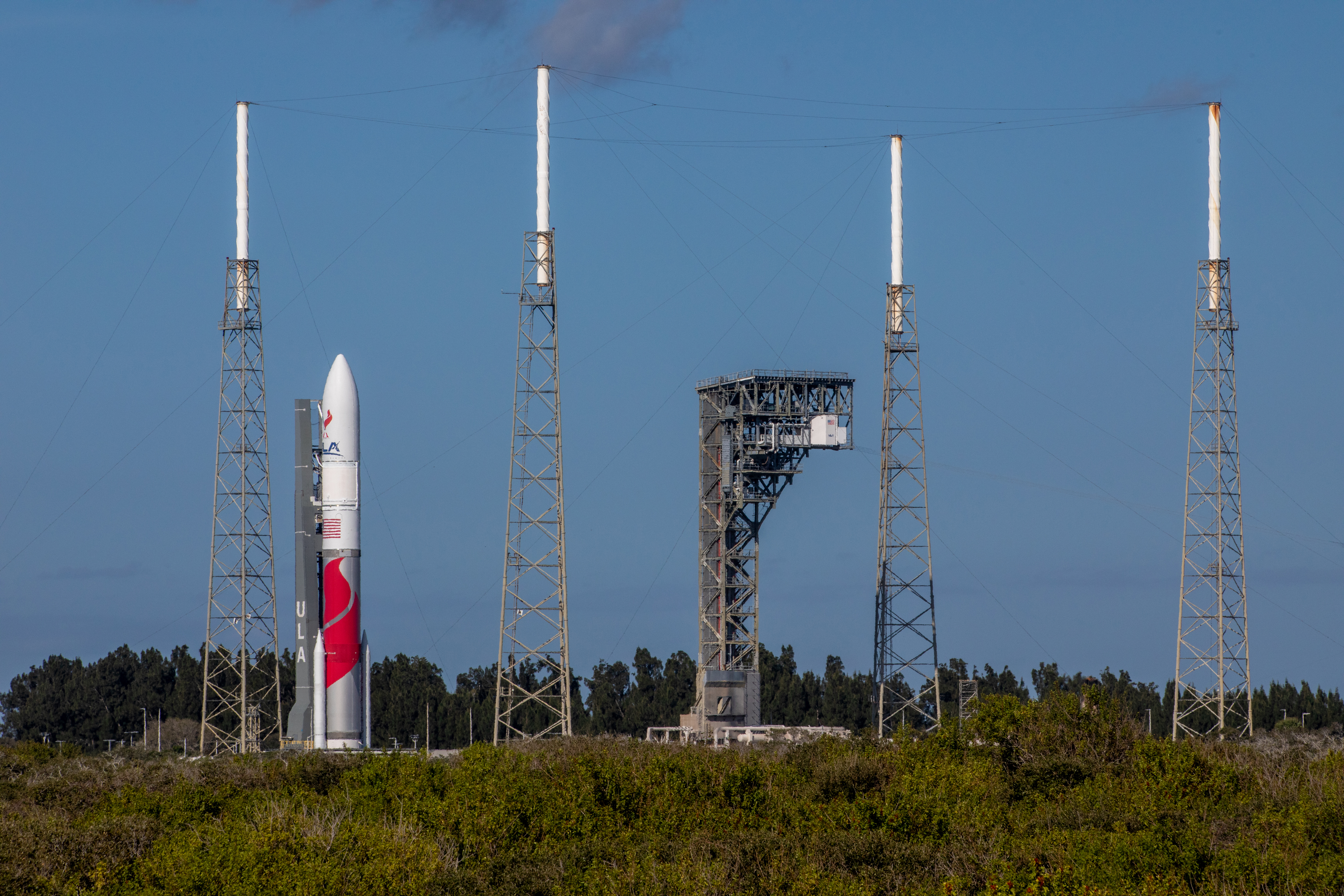
SLC-41 in January 2024, with a Vulcan Centaur rolling out from the VIF.

Space Launch Complex 41 (SLC-41) is positioned at the northern tip of the ITL on Titan III Road, and is currently used by United Launch Alliance for launching Atlas V and Vulcan Centaur. It was previously named Launch Complex 41 (LC-41), being used for launching Titan IIIC, Titan IIIE, and Titan IV prior to its current configuration. It is also unique among the other pads of Cape Canaveral Space Force Station in that it is an enclave located on the grounds of Kennedy Space Center.

Originally, the pad was built as an identical copy of LC-40, having a launch tower and service structure for the same Titan III-related purposes. Additionally, LC-41 received four lightning towers during the lead up to Titan IV use. Following the program's winding down and consolidation to LC-40, Lockheed Martin had the original Titan pad equipment demolished when they were leased LC-41 for the Atlas V. The launch tower was later rebuilt during the mid-2010s, this time for crew access to the Boeing Starliner. The site has undergone further modifications in the early 2020s, to be able to accommodate the new Vulcan Centaur rocket. This included the expansion of propellant storage systems, improvements to the water suppression system, and renovation of the rail system from SLC-41 to the SPOC.

=== Launch Complex 42 ===
During the initial planning of the ITL complex, a third launch facility named Launch Complex 42 (LC-42) was included. It would have been branched to the north of the Titan causeway, going all the way to one of the islands near the Saturn Barge Channel. It was ultimately never built due to a lack of need stemming from the Titan III's low cadence, as well as proximity safety concerns with nearby Launch Complex 39A.

=== Vertical Integration Building ===
The Vertical Integration Building was built along the rest of the complex in the early 1960s, and used to stack the first, second and third stage of Titan III rockets. It was similar to the larger Vehicle Assembly Building with four high bays/cells, however those on the VIB were arranged in a line on the southern face. It also featured connected buildings for payload integration. In operation with Titan III, the three stages and their payload were assembled on the mobile launch platform in one of the high bays, then departed heading southward, later reversing direction and heading northward towards the SMAB, passing by the VIB's east side. For the Titan IV, the VIB only stacked the first and second stages, with the SRBs being handled at the SMARF and the payload with its upper stage being added at the launch pad. It was demolished in 2006 after the Titan IV retired.

=== Solid Motor Assembly Building ===
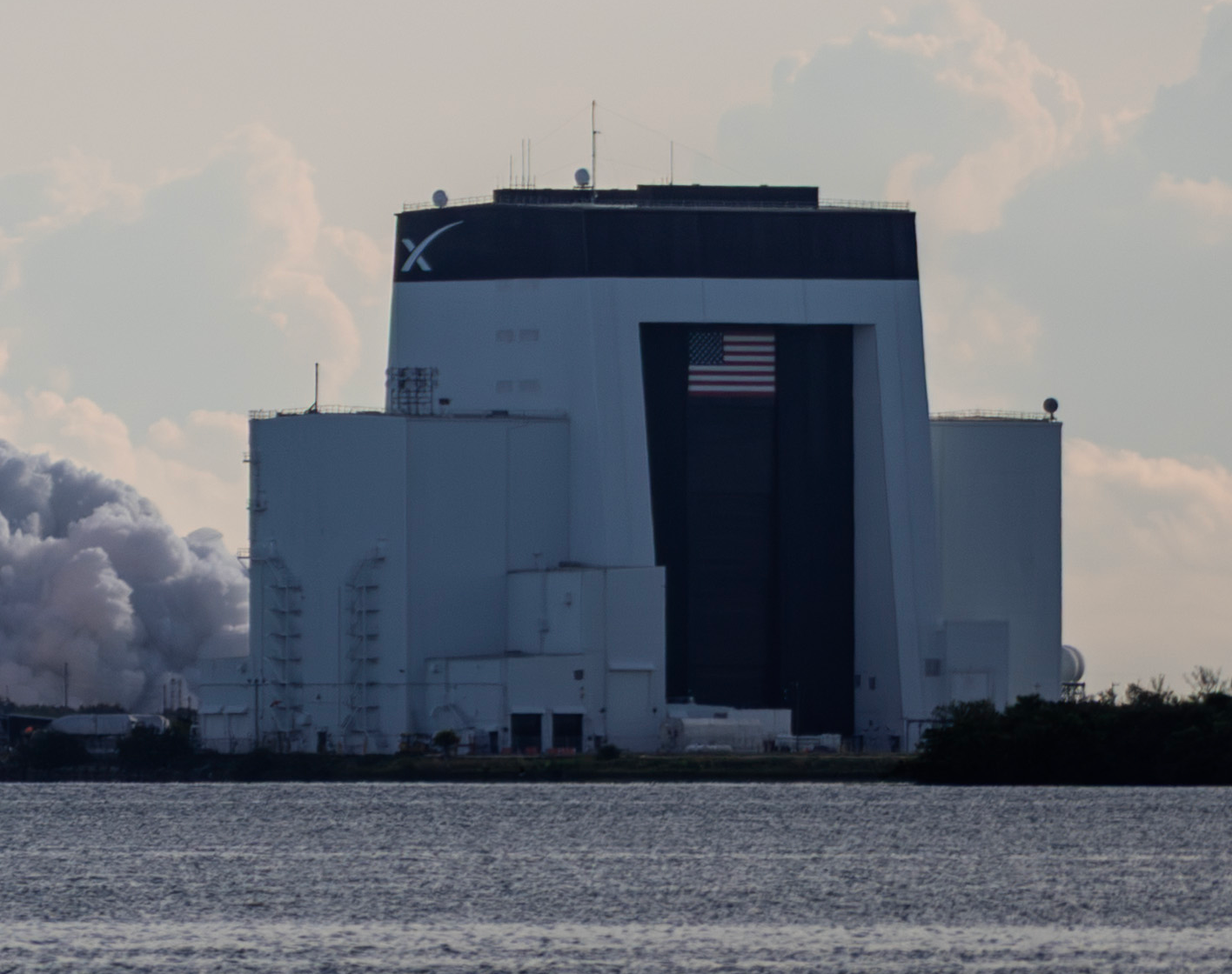
The SMAB in August 2025. In the background is smoke from a Falcon 9 launching an Amazon Leo batch from SLC-40.

The Solid Motor Assembly Building (SMAB) was built and used to assemble multisegment SRBs and attach them to Titan III cores. It featured one central "high bay" for the core and mobile launch pad to go through, with doors on north and south sides, and a pair of "low bays" for SRB processing on the western and eastern sides. In operation, the core arrived from the VIB through the south door, the SRB segments got attached using a 350 ton bridge crane, then the completed rocket left through the north door towards the launch pads. The high bay ceased operations after the Titan III retired. During the Space Shuttle era, the western "low bay" was rebuilt into the Shuttle Payload Integration Facility (SPIF), used for processing Inertial Upper Stage assemblies and mating payloads to them in a pair of "integration cells". Nowadays, it is used by SpaceX for integrating payloads with Falcon 9 fairings. It was damaged by Hurricane Matthew in 2016, with the storm tearing 'school bus size holes' in the outer shell.

=== Amazon Vertical Integration Facility ===
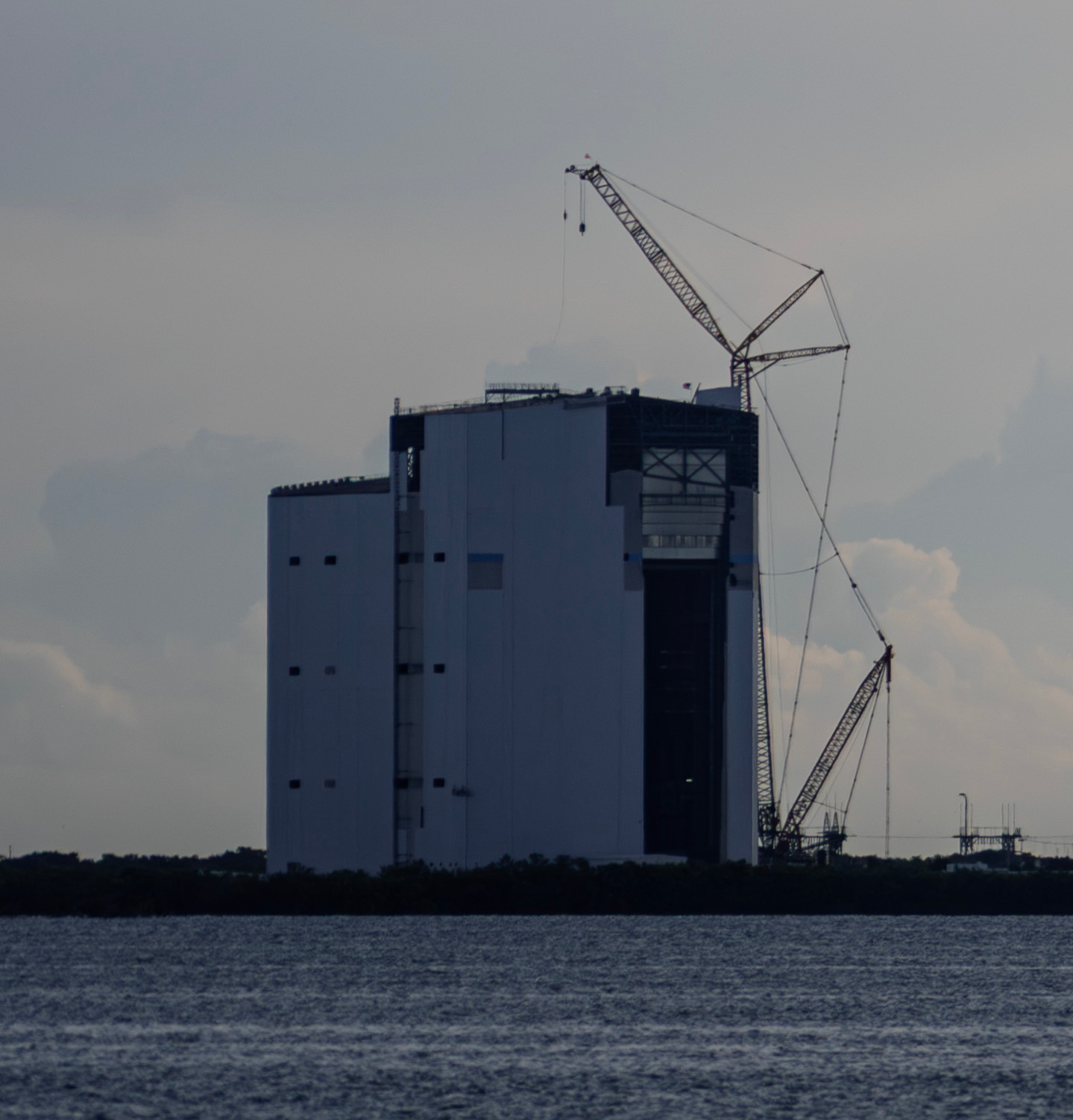
VIF-A in August 2025, during renovation.

The Amazon Vertical Integration Facility (VIF-A) was built in late 1980s as the Solid Motor Assembly Readiness Facility (SMARF), for the purpose of assembling SRBs for Titan IV, as the SMAB couldn't handle the larger rocket without a major rebuild. It is located near where the paths between SLC-40 and SLC-41 diverge, in what used to be a hydrazine tank car storage area. It was built with a single bay and a single five-segment entrance/exit door for the mobile launcher, and was capable of stacking and storage of two flight sets of SRMU solid boosters in a vertical, checked out configuration. After the Titan IV was retired, the SMARF sat mostly unused for some time, occasionally being used for storage. In 2019, ULA acquired the building and renamed it as the Spaceflight Processing Operations Center (SPOC, a reference to the character Spock from Star Trek). The SPOC was used as a warehouse for construction of two mobile launcher platforms for Vulcan. To support a higher launch cadence, particularly for the Amazon Leo constellation, ULA has converted the SPOC into the company's second integration facility at Cape Canaveral, giving its current designation. Upgrades included raising the roof by 13 meters (45 feet), rebuilding the previously dismantled double-track railway, adding an indoor parking area for a second mobile launcher platform when not in use, and creating an offline vertical integration (OVI) cell to allow parallel processing of the Centaur V upper stage and Vulcan booster prior to stacking.

=== Government Vertical Integration Facility ===
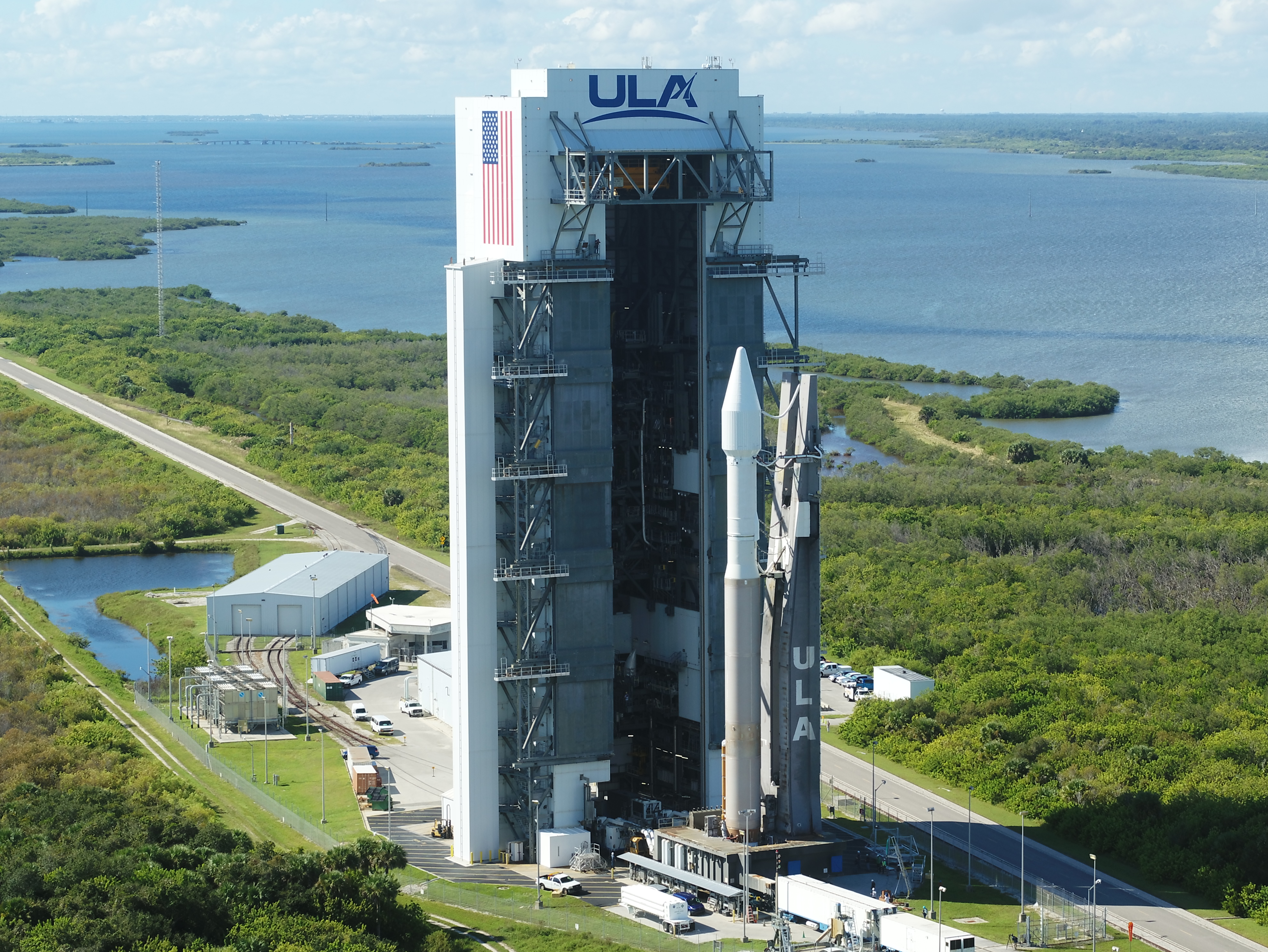
The VIF-G in October 2021, rolling out an Atlas V 401 carrying Lucy.

The Government Vertical Integration Facility (VIF-G) is located approximately 570 meters (1,900 feet) south from SLC-41, currently used to assemble Atlas V and Vulcan Centaur cores and integrate their payloads. It features one processing bay, with a door for the mobile launcher to the north, a hammerhead gantry crane, and connected to the pad and rest of the ITL by two parallel railroad tracks.

It was originally constructed as the Vertical Integration Facility (VIF) in the early 2000s by Lockheed Martin for the Atlas V's assembly, as the rest of the ITL was still in-use by the Titan IV. During the early 2020s, United Launch Alliance facilitated a renovation of the VIF to support Vulcan integration alongside Atlas, with eventual plans for it to be used for those carrying DoD or NASA payloads.

== See also ==
- List of Cape Canaveral and Merritt Island launch sites
- Space Launch Complex 40
- Space Launch Complex 41
- Launch Complex 39
  - Launch Complex 39A
  - Launch Complex 39B
