= United Launch Alliance =

Joint venture of Lockheed Martin and Boeing

United Launch Alliance, LLC

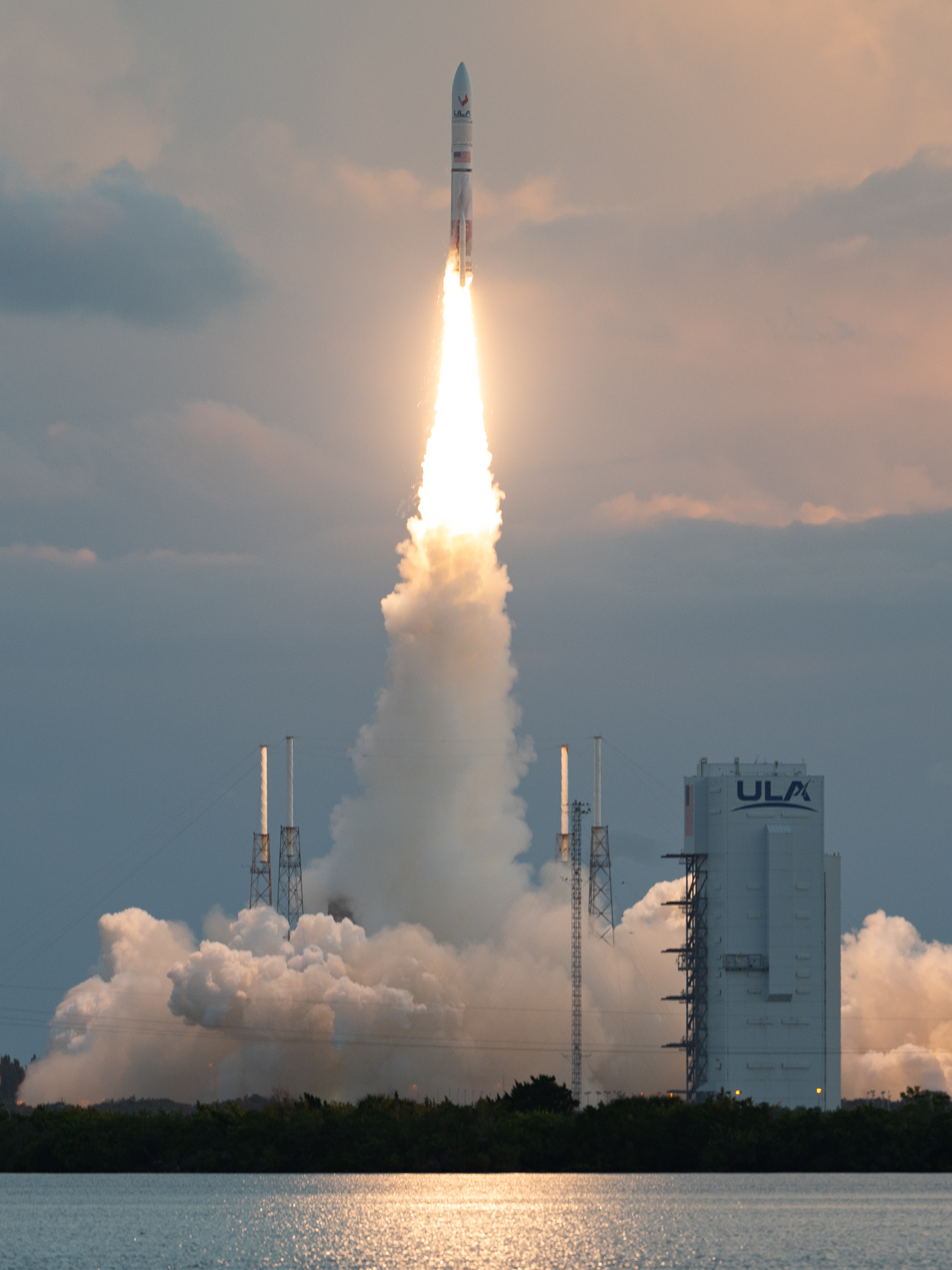
- Vulcan Centaur launches with the company's Vertical Integration Facility in the foreground
- Type: Joint venture
- Industry: Space
- Founded: December 1, 2006; 19 years ago
- Headquarters: Centennial, Colorado, U.S.
- Key people: Mark Peller (CEO)
- Products: Vulcan Centaur; Atlas V (retiring)
- Revenue: US$1.3 billion (2022)
- Net income: US$200 million (2022)
- Owner: Lockheed Martin Space (50%); Boeing Defense, Space & Security (50%)
- Number of employees: 2,700 (2024)
- Website: ulalaunch.com

United Launch Alliance, LLC (ULA) is an American launch service provider formed in December 2006 as a joint venture between Lockheed Martin Space and Boeing Defense, Space & Security. The company designs, assembles, sells and launches rockets. The company uses rocket engines, solid rocket boosters, and other components supplied by other companies.

When founded, the company inherited the Atlas V rocket from Lockheed Martin and the Delta rocket family from Boeing. As of 2024, the Delta family has been retired and the Atlas V is in the process of being retired. ULA began development of the Vulcan Centaur in 2014 as replacement for both the Atlas and Delta rocket families. The Vulcan Centaur completed its maiden flight in January 2024.

The primary customers of ULA are the Department of Defense (DoD) and NASA, but it also serves commercial clients.

== Company history ==
=== Formation ===
Boeing and Lockheed Martin announced on May 2, 2005, that they would establish a 50/50 joint venture, United Launch Alliance (ULA), to consolidate their space launch operations.

The two companies had long competed for launch services contracts from the DoD, and their Atlas and Delta rockets were the two launch vehicles selected under the Evolved Expendable Launch Vehicle (EELV) program. The DoD had hoped the program would foster the creation of a strong, competitive commercial launch market. However, both companies said that this competition had made space launches unprofitable. Boeing's future in the program was also threatened in 2003 when it was found to be in possession of proprietary documents from Lockheed Martin. To end litigation and competition, both companies agreed to form the ULA joint venture. During the renewal of the EELV contract, the DoD said the merger would provide annual cost savings of $100–150 million.

SpaceX attempted to challenge the merger on anti-trust grounds, saying it would create a space launch monopoly. The Federal Trade Commission ultimately granted ULA anti-trust clearance, prioritizing national security access to space over potential competition concerns.

=== Michael Gass era (2005–2014) ===
Michael Gass was announced as the first CEO of ULA and oversaw the merger of the two groups. Production was consolidated into one central plant in Decatur, Alabama while all engineering was moved into a facility in Littleton, Colorado. The parent companies retained responsibility for marketing and sales of the Delta and Atlas rockets.

Cost pressures led ULA to announce it would lay off 350 of its 4,200 workers in early 2009, and decommissioned two of its seven launch pads. ULA also joined and later left the Commercial Spaceflight Federation during this period.

The introduction of lower-cost competition and rising ULA launch costs attracted scrutiny. ULA's reliance on government funding for launch readiness, including maintaining multiple launchpads and rocket variants, became a point of discussion, particularly as the EELV program experienced a cost breach in 2012.

ULA was awarded a DoD contract in December 2013 to provide 36 rocket cores for up to 28 launches. The award drew protest from SpaceX, which said the cost of ULA's launches were approximately US$460 million each and proposed a price of US$90 million to provide similar launches. In response, Gass said ULA's average launch price was US$225 million, with future launches as low as US$100 million.

=== Tory Bruno era (2014–2025) ===
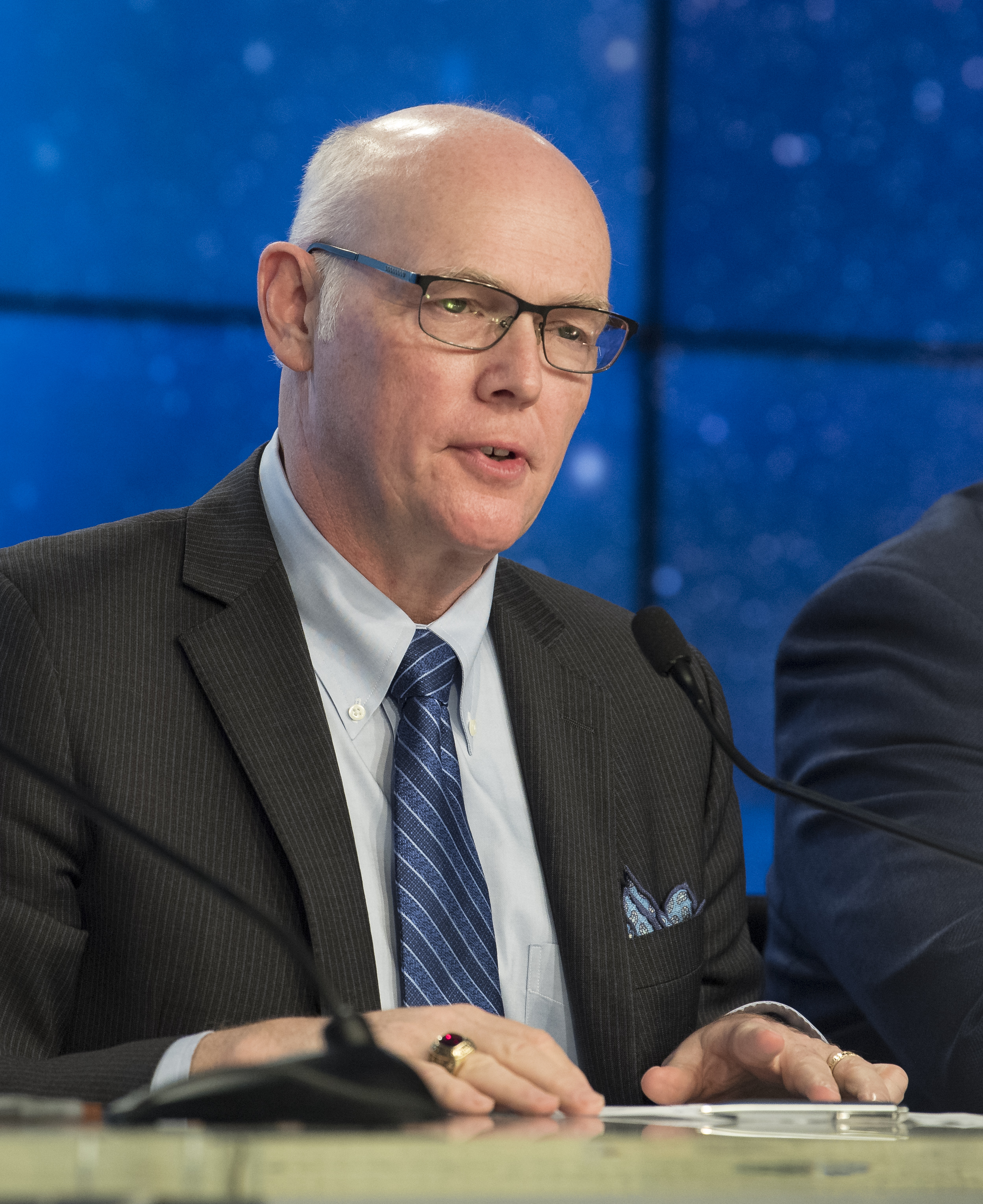
ULA CEO Tory Bruno at a NASA news conference in December 2019

In August 2014, Tory Bruno became CEO of ULA. Bruno's appointment came as ULA faced pressure to develop a next-generation launch vehicle and reduce costs to better compete with SpaceX and its partially reusable rockets. The company's high launch costs left it with few commercial and civil satellite customers, making it increasingly reliant on U.S. military and intelligence contracts, which were also under competitive threat from SpaceX. Additionally, ULA faced pressure to replace its Russian-made RD-180 engines with Western alternatives following the Russian annexation of Crimea. In 2016, Congress passed a law prohibiting the military from procuring launch services using the RD-180 after 2022.

To reduce costs, ULA underwent major restructuring, cutting its workforce from 3,600 to 2,500 by 2018 and consolidating operations from five launch pads to two. To develop a replacement engine, ULA partnered with Blue Origin on the BE-4, which became the core of its next-generation Vulcan Centaur rocket. Vulcan was designed to lower costs and increase competitiveness in the commercial market, combining technologies from the Delta and Atlas families with new innovations.

Despite these efforts, ULA's services remained more expensive than SpaceX's. Its joint bid with Dynetics for a NASA lunar lander was rejected in 2021 as "low in readiness." The Delta rocket family was retired in 2024. While the vehicle supported critical national security and NASA missions, it was expensive and slow to manufacture, limiting its commercial viability. The Falcon Heavy effectively captured its commercial market share. ULA stockpiled approximately 100 RD-180 engines for the Atlas V to fulfill remaining contracts, with no new orders planned.

In 2022, Amazon selected ULA as one of its launch providers for Project Kuiper, a satellite internet constellation, awarding 9 launches on Atlas V and 38 on Vulcan Centaur, out of 83 total launches, marking ULA’s largest-ever commercial contract.

By late 2023, Boeing and Lockheed Martin were seeking to sell ULA, with potential buyers including Blue Origin, Cerberus Capital Management, and Textron. Reports in mid-2024 indicated Sierra Space was in advanced talks to acquire ULA. As of 2025, however, the company had not been sold.

In April 2025, the U.S. Department of Defense awarded ULA a $5.3 billion contract for 19 missions as part of a multibillion-dollar procurement covering approximately 80 national security launches between 2025 and 2034. SpaceX received the majority of missions (28), while Blue Origin was awarded seven.

Military officials expressed growing frustration with ULA over ongoing delays in the Vulcan program. In testimony to the House Armed Services Committee in May 2025, Major General Stephen G. Purdy called the rocket's recent performance "unsatisfactory," noting that slow progress in replacing the Atlas and Delta launch vehicles had postponed four national security missions. These delays, he said, disrupted the Space Force’s ability to meet key objectives. Purdy added that ULA would need to "repair trust" and demonstrate greater accountability.

On December 22, 2025, Tory Bruno resigned as president and CEO of United Launch Alliance in an unexpected departure. The ULA board did not specify a reason for Bruno's resignation at the time, later revealed to be his move to competitor Blue Origin, and chief operating officer John Elbon was named interim CEO.

== Products ==
When the joint venture was founded in 2006, ULA inherited the Atlas rocket family from Lockheed Martin and the Delta rocket family from Boeing. As of 2024, the Delta family has been retired and the Atlas V is in the process of being retired. ULA began development of the Vulcan Centaur in 2014 as replacement for both the Atlas and Delta rocket families.

=== Vulcan Centaur ===
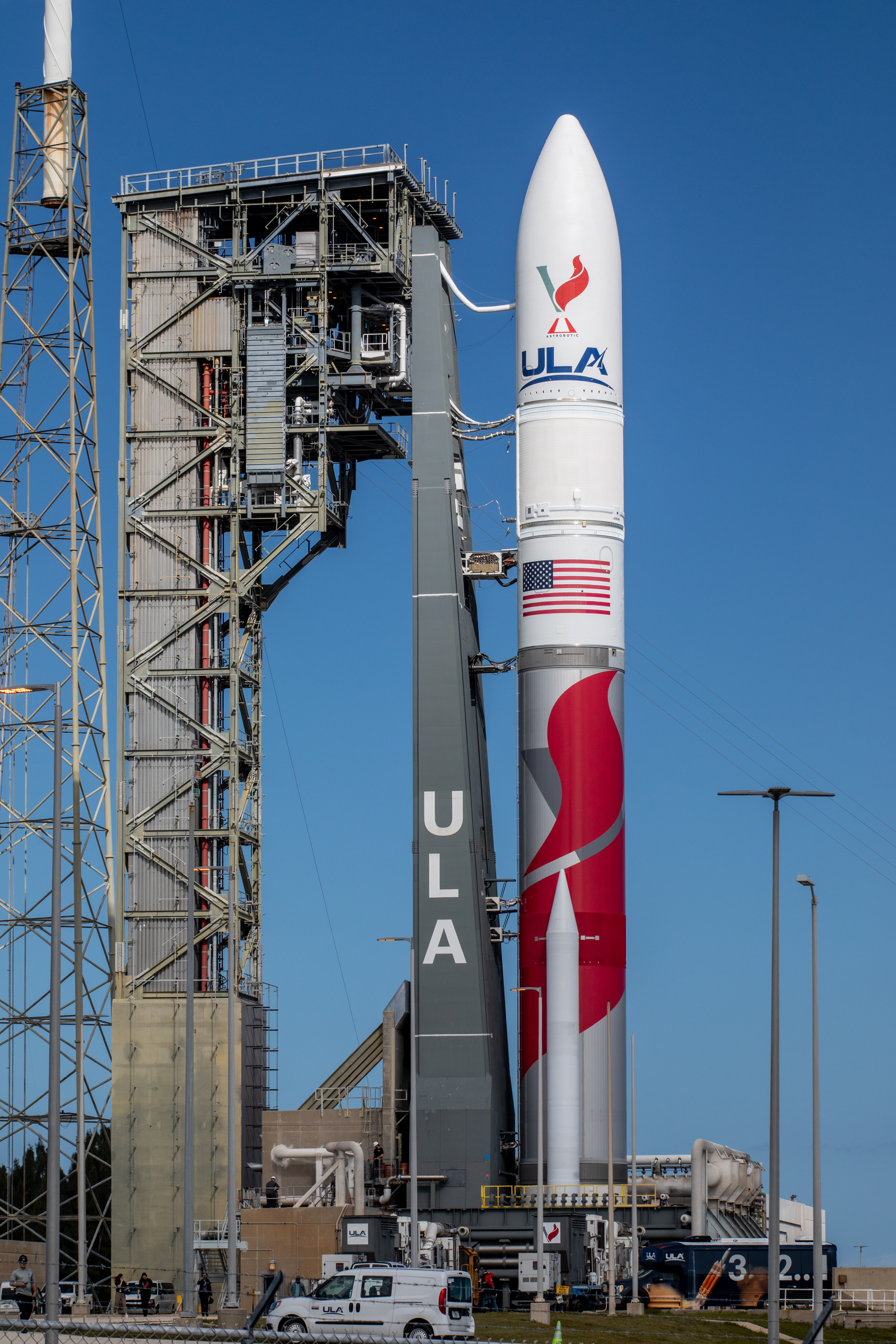
Vulcan Centaur

The Vulcan Centaur is a heavy-lift launch vehicle developed by ULA integrating technology from both its prior Atlas and Delta rocket families along with advancements. Vulcan has been designed to meet the requirements of the National Security Space Launch (NSSL) program and be capable of achieving human-rating certification to allow the launch of a vehicle such as the Boeing Starliner or Sierra Nevada Dream Chaser.

The rocket was developed as ULA faced pressure to respond to growing competition from SpaceX and its reusable rockets and the need to phase out the RD-180 engine used on the Atlas V, which is built in Russia, and subject to international sanctions after the Russian invasion of Ukraine.

The Vulcan Centaur has a maximum liftoff thrust of 3,800,000 pounds-force (17,000 kN), enabling it to carry 56,000 pounds (25,000 kg) to low Earth orbit, 33,000 lb (15,000 kg) to a geostationary transfer orbit, and 16,000 lb (7,300 kg) to geostationary orbit.

The Vulcan first stage is the same size as the Delta family's Common Booster Core, uses two BE-4 engines built by Blue Origin and fueled by liquid oxygen and liquid methane (liquefied natural gas). The second stage is the Centaur V, an improved version of the Centaur III used on the Atlas, which is powered by two RL10 engines built by Aerojet Rocketdyne, fueled by liquid hydrogen and liquid oxygen. The first stage can be supplemented by up to six GEM 63XL solid rocket boosters built by Northrop Grumman.

ULA is investigating a way to partially reuse its launch vehicles with the Sensible Modular Autonomous Return Technology (SMART) system. This system envisions jettisoning the BE-4 engines and avionics as a single unit which would be protected by an inflatable heat shield during its descent back to Earth. After being slowed by parachutes and splashing down in the ocean, the heat shield would double as a raft, and the engines and avionics module would be retrieved for refurbishment. ULA estimates that this approach could reduce the cost of producing the first stage of its rockets by 65%.

Development of the Vulcan Centaur was funded as a public–private partnership with the U.S. government contributing approximately US$1.2 billion toward initial development costs. Boeing and Lockheed Martin contributed the remaining cost of development, estimated at 75% of the cost, as of March 2018.

In October 2018, the NSSL program purchased a prototype Vulcan mission to be launched in 2019. In August 2020 ULA was awarded a contract to launch 60% of NSSL missions over a 5-year period beginning in 2022. However, Vulcan Centaur was delayed repeatedly. The inaugural flight occurred on January 8, 2024, successfully sending the Peregrine lunar lander into orbit toward the moon. This launch was intended to allow Astrobotic Technology to conduct five lunar experiments for NASA.

ULA completed a second test flight, named Cert-2, of the Vulcan Centaur on the morning of October 4, 2024, at Cape Canaveral. The Space Force will examine the flight data to determine if Vulcan Centaur will be certified for national security missions.

=== Atlas V ===
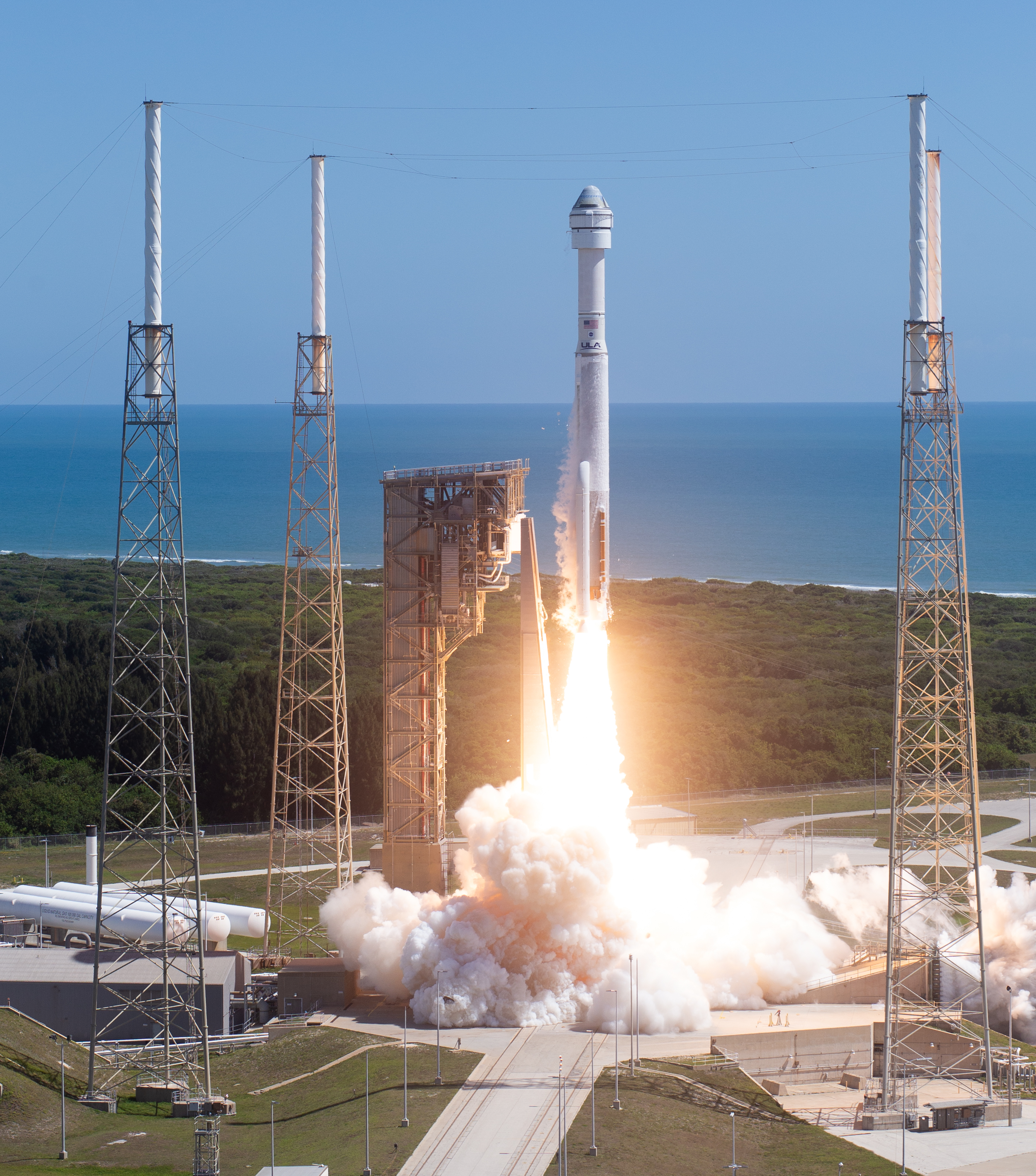
Atlas V N22 launches Boeing Starliner Calypso on the Boeing Crew Flight Test

Developed by Lockheed Martin and transitioned to ULA in 2006, the Atlas V was ULA's primary launch vehicle for two decades. However, As of 2025 the rocket is nearing retirement, with all remaining flights booked and no new orders accepted. As of January 2026, Atlas V had completed 106 missions, with 10 launches scheduled. The rocket has been offered in eleven configurations, though only the "551" and "N22" remain operational.

Born from the National Security Space Launch (NSSL) program, the Atlas V's first successful launch took place in 2002. This expendable launch system utilizes a two-stage design. The first stage, named the Common Core Booster, uses a single Russian-made RD-180 engine, fueled by kerosene and liquid oxygen. The second stage, a Centaur III powered by the RL10 engine burning liquid hydrogen and liquid oxygen. The first stage can be supplemented by up to five AJ-60A or GEM 63 solid rocket boosters.

The Atlas V has undergone modifications for human spaceflight, specifically for Boeing's Starliner capsule. These modifications include upgraded computers for monitoring and abort capabilities, data links, and manual abort mechanisms for the crew. Notably, Starliner missions use a unique Atlas V configuration: two solid rocket boosters, no payload fairing, and a dual-engine Centaur second stage for a shallower launch profile and reduced crew G-forces. This configuration stands 172 feet tall, and ULA was contracted for nine Starliner missions with Atlas V.

=== Interim Cryogenic Propulsion Stage ===
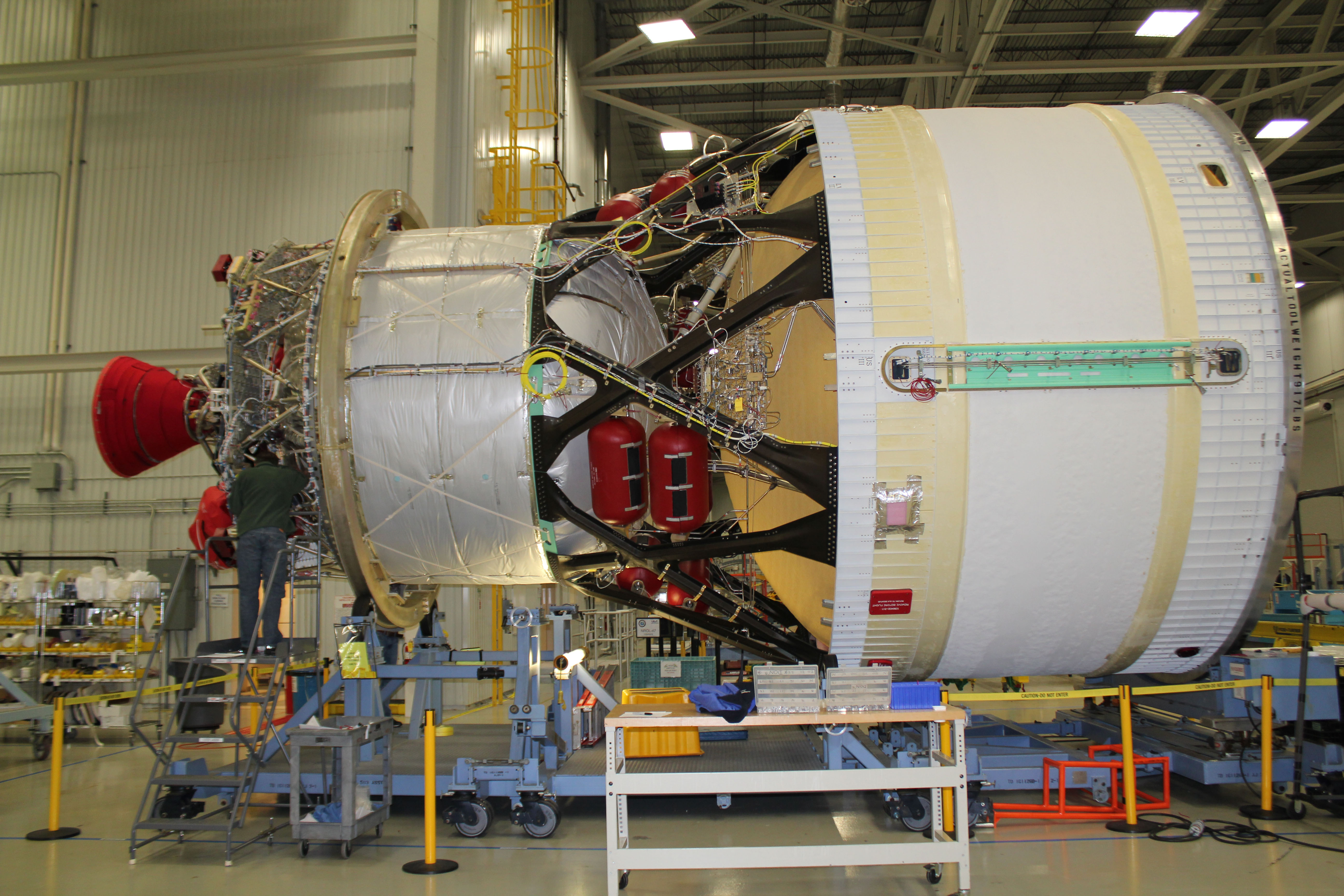
ICPS for Artemis I while under construction

The Interim Cryogenic Propulsion Stage (ICPS) provides the second stage boost for the initial configuration (Block 1) of NASA's Space Launch System (SLS). The ICPS design was based on the Delta Cryogenic Second Stage employed by ULA's Delta launch vehicles. The ICPS is positioned atop the SLS core stage and directly below the Orion spacecraft. The ICPS has a cylindrical liquid hydrogen tank, structurally designed to bear launch loads, while the liquid oxygen and single RL10B-2 engine are suspended from the hydrogen tank and are covered by the interstage during launch. Only three ICPS stages were built, one for each of the Artemis I, II, and III missions. For later missions, NASA had planned to instead use the Exploration Upper Stage built by Boeing. However, in February 2026 NASA announced changes in the Artemis program, including the use of a different second stage for SLS. This new alternate stage was later reported to be a variant of Vulcan's Centaur V stage, produced by ULA.

=== Retired ===
==== Delta II ====
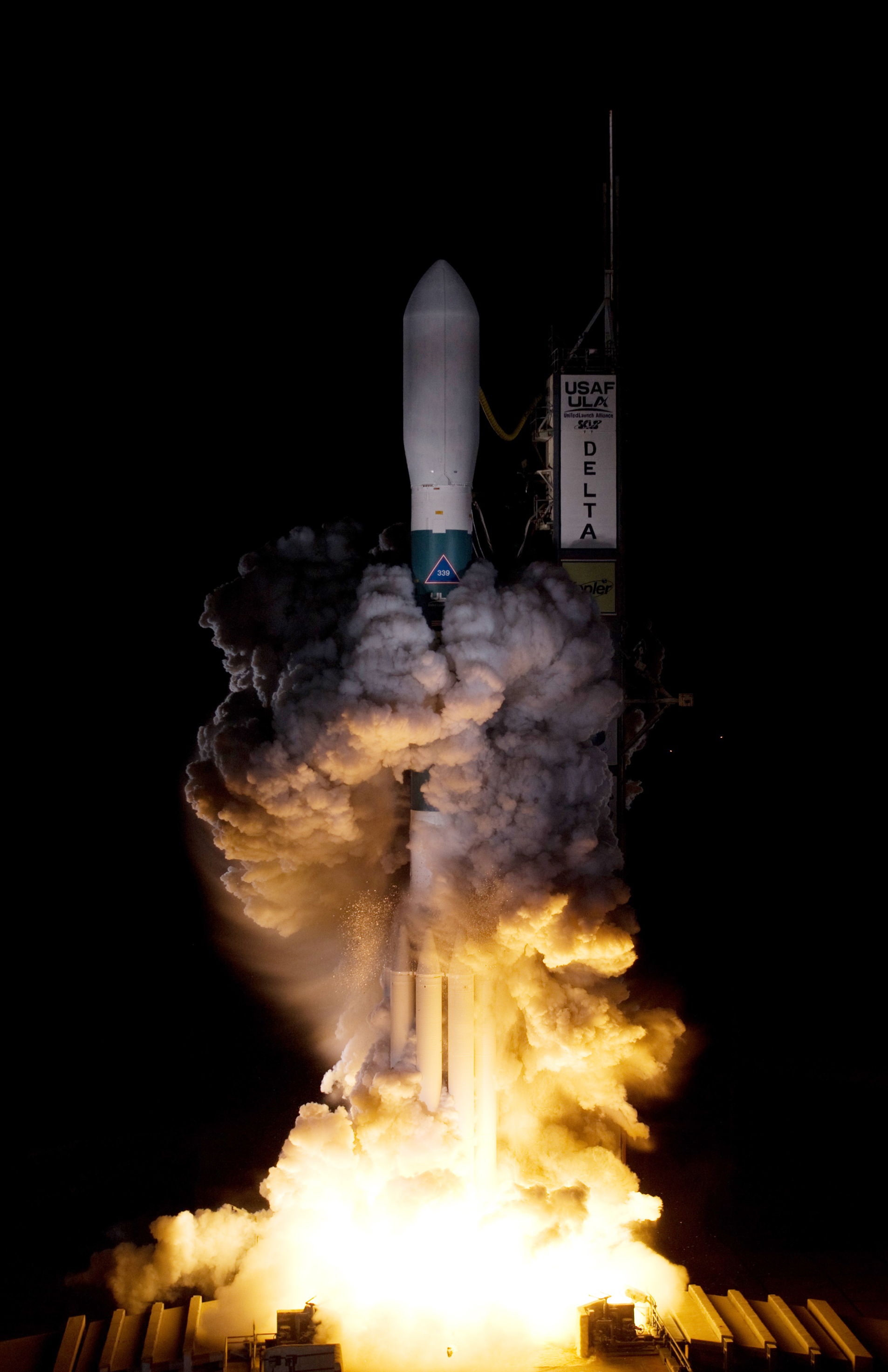
Delta II launch of Kepler Space Telescope

Delta II was an expendable launch system that was originally designed and built by McDonnell Douglas, and was later built by Boeing prior to the formation of ULA. Delta II was part of the Delta rocket family and entered service in 1989. ULA flew thirty missions using Delta II starting in 2006. Delta II vehicles included the Delta 6000 and the two later Delta 7000 variants ("Light" and "Heavy"). The rocket flew its final mission ICESat-2 on September 15, 2018. A nearly-complete Delta II, made from flight-qualified spare parts, is displayed in its 7320-10 configuration in the rocket garden at Kennedy Space Center Visitors Complex.

==== Delta IV ====
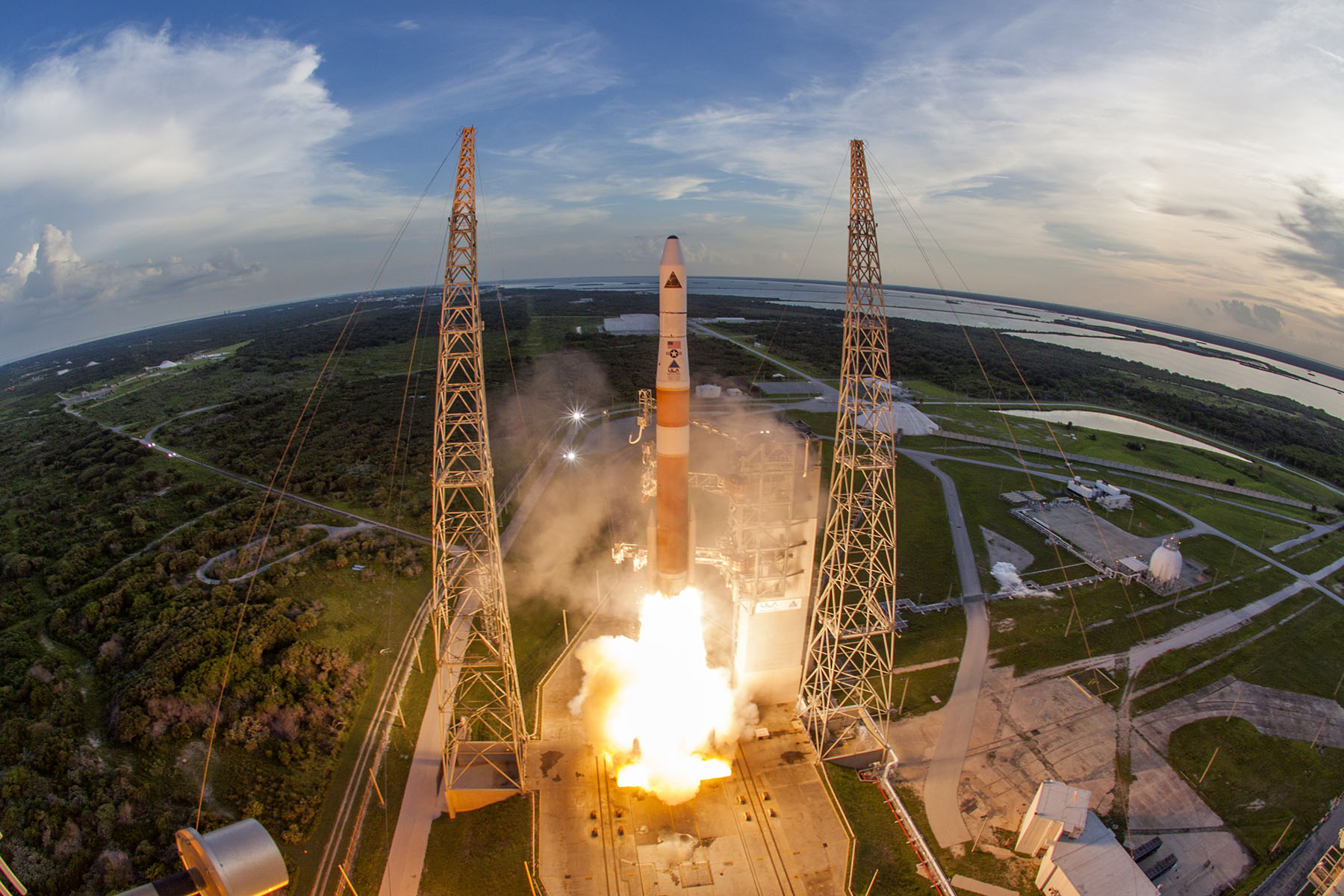
Delta IV launch of AFSPC-6

Delta IV is a group of five expendable launch systems in the Delta rocket family, which was introduced in the early 2000s. The Delta IV was originally designed by Boeing's Defense, Space & Security division for the Evolved Expendable Launch Vehicle (EELV) program, and became a ULA product in 2006. The Delta IV was mostly used for launching United States Air Force military payloads but was also used to launch a number of U.S. government non-military payloads and one commercial satellite. Delta IV had two main versions, which allowed the family to accommodate a range of payload sizes and masses; models includes Medium, which had four configurations, and the Heavy. Payloads that would previously fly on Medium moved to either Atlas V or Vulcan Centaur. ULA flew a total of 20 Delta IV (non-heavy) from 2009 to 2018.

==== Delta IV Heavy ====
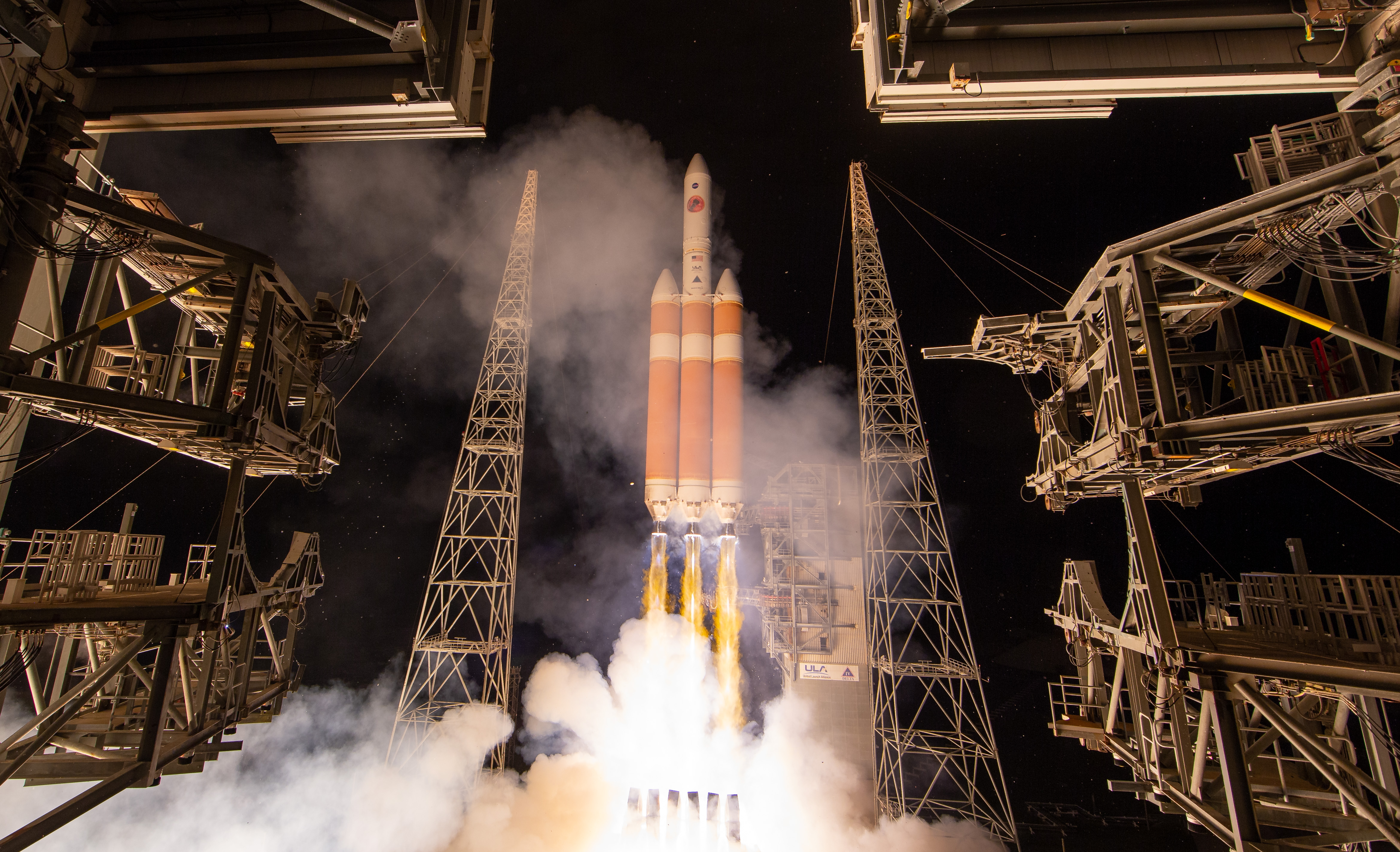
Delta IV Heavy launch of Parker Solar Probe

Delta IV Heavy was the largest member of the Delta IV family. Boeing flew it on one mission prior to the formation of ULA, and ULA on fifteen missions from 2007 to 2024. Its final launch was April 9, 2024, at Cape Canaveral Space Force Station. The Delta IV Heavy combined a 5 m (16 ft) diameter DCSS and payload fairing with two additional CBCs. These are strap-on boosters which are separated earlier in the flight than the center CBC. The 5 meter diameter composite fairing was standard on the Delta IV Heavy, with an aluminum isogrid fairing also available. The aluminum trisector (three-part) fairing was built by Boeing and derived from a Titan IV fairing. The trisector fairing was first used on the DSP-23 flight. Delta IV Heavy had 16 launches in its lifetime.

== Launch history ==
=== Summary chart ===
- Atlas V
- Delta II
- Delta IV Medium
- Delta IV Heavy
- Vulcan Centaur
- Failure

Statistics are up-to-date as of November 15, 2026. (See List of Atlas launches (2020–2029) and List of Vulcan launches)

=== 2006–2009 ===
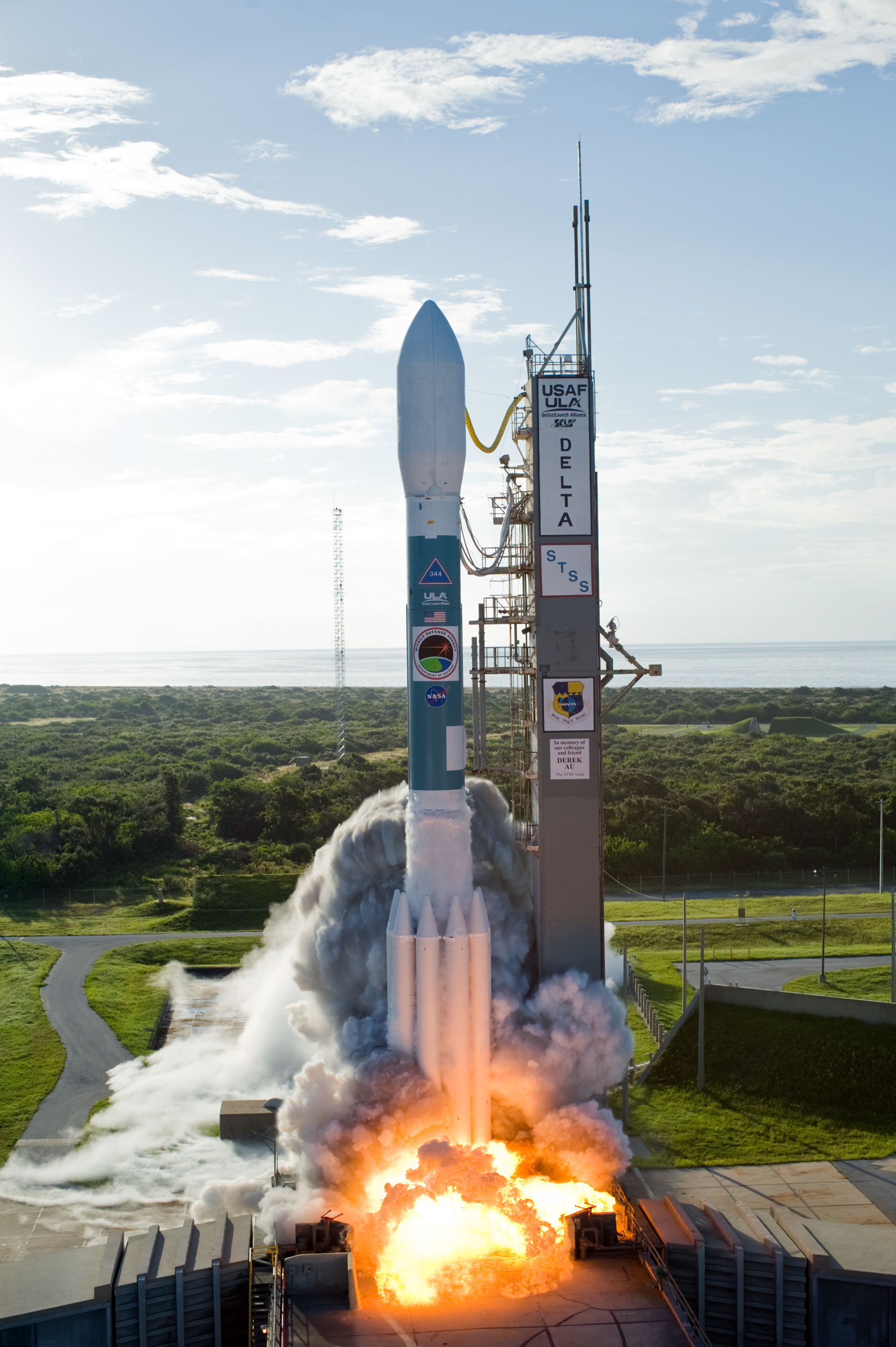
Ignition of the engines of a Delta II

The first launch conducted by ULA was a Delta II from Vandenberg Space Force Base on December 14, 2006, carrying the satellite USA-193 for the National Reconnaissance Office. The satellite failed shortly after launch and was intentionally destroyed on February 21, 2008, by an SM-3 missile that was fired from the Ticonderoga-class cruiser USS Lake Erie. ULA's first Atlas V launch was in March 2007; it was an Atlas V variant 401 launching six military research satellites for Space Test Program (STP) 1. This mission also performed three burns of the Centaur upper stage; it was the first three-burn mission for Atlas V.

ULA's first commercial mission COSMO-SkyMed was launched on behalf of Italy's Ministry of Defense three months later using a Delta II rocket. On June 15, 2007, the engine in the Centaur upper stage of a ULA-launched Atlas V shut down early, leaving its payload – a pair of NROL-30 ocean surveillance satellites – in a lower than intended orbit. The NRO declared the launch a success.

2007 also saw ULA's first two interplanetary spacecraft launches using the Delta II; the Phoenix probe was launched to Mars in August 2007 and the Dawn satellite to was launched to the asteroids Vesta and Ceres in September 2007. Using a Delta II, the WorldView-1 satellite was also launched into a low Earth orbit on behalf of DigitalGlobe. The company's first launch to geostationary transfer orbit using an Atlas V 421 variant carrying the USA-195 (or WGS-1) communications satellite also occurred that year. ULA's tenth mission was launching satellite GPS IIR-17 into medium Earth orbit on a Delta II. The company completed its first Delta IV launch using the Delta IV Heavy rocket to place a payload into geosynchronous orbit in November 2007, which was followed by three more launches in December 2007.

2008 saw seven launches, including Atlas V's from Vandenberg's Space Launch Complex 3E and five others using the Delta II. The Atlas launch carried NROL-28 in March 2008 and in September 2008 the GeoEye-1 satellite was orbited by a Delta II rocket. ULA completed eight Delta II, five Atlas V, and three Delta IV launches in 2009. The Delta II launches carried three Space Tracking and Surveillance System satellites over two launches, two Global Positioning System satellites, and the NOAA-19 and WorldView-2 satellites, as well as the Kepler and the Wide-field Infrared Survey Explorer space telescopes.

The Atlas launches carried the Lunar Reconnaissance Orbiter and LCROSS mission as part of the Lunar Precursor Robotic Program, which was later intentionally crashed into the Moon and found the existence of water; other 2009 Atlas V launches in included Intelsat 14, WGS-2, PAN, and a weather satellite as part of the Defense Meteorological Satellite Program (DMSP). The Delta IV rockets carried the NROL-26, GOES 14, and WGS-3 satellites.

=== 2010–2014 ===
In 2010, Atlas V launches deployed the Solar Dynamics Observatory, the first Boeing X-37B, the first Advanced Extremely High Frequency (AEHF) satellite, and the NROL-41. The Delta II system placed the last COSMO-SkyMed and Delta IV launches deployed the GOES 15, GPS Block IIF, and USA-223 satellites. ULA completed eleven launches in 2011, including five by Atlas, three by Delta II, and three by Delta IV. The Atlas system orbited another Boeing X-37, two NROL-34 signals intelligence satellites, a Space-Based Infrared System (SBIRS) satellite, the Juno spacecraft and Curiosity rover. The Delta II launches placed the SAC-D and Suomi NPP satellites into orbit, as well as two spacecraft associated with NASA's GRAIL lunar mission. Delta IV launches carried the NROL-49, NROL-27, and another GPS satellite.

ULA's 2012 launches included six Atlas Vs and four Delta IVs. The Atlas system carried Mobile User Objective System (MUOS) and AEHF satellites, another Boeing X-37, the Intruder and Quasar satellites, and the Van Allen Probes. Delta IVs deployed GPS and WGS satellites USA-233, as well as NROL-25 and NROL-15 on behalf of the National Reconnaissance Office.

In 2013, the Atlas flew eight times. The system launched the TDRS-11, Landsat 8, AEHF-3, and NROL-39 satellites, as well as SBIRS, GPS, and MUOS satellites, as well as NASA's MAVEN space probe to Mars. Delta IV launches orbited the fifth and sixth Wideband Global SATCOM satellites WGS-5 and WGS-6, as well as NROL-65.

In 2014, ULA's Atlas V orbited the TDRS-12 communications satellite in January, the WorldView-3 commercial satellite in August 2014, and the CLIO communications satellite during September and October 2014. Atlas rockets also carried the satellites DMSP-5D-3/F19, NROL-67, NROL-33, and NROL-35. Delta IV rockets orbited GPS satellites and two Geosynchronous Space Situational Awareness Program satellites, and in July 2014, NASA's Orbiting Carbon Observatory 2 was carried by a Delta II. Orion's first test flight was launched by a Delta IV Heavy rocket in December 2014, as part of Exploration Flight Test-1.

=== 2015–2019 ===
A Delta II rocket orbited a Soil Moisture Active Passive satellite in January 2015. In March 2015, an Atlas V rocket carried NASA's Magnetospheric Multiscale Mission spacecraft, and a Delta IV rocket orbited the GPS IIF-9 satellite on behalf of the U.S. Air Force. The U.S. Air Force's X-37B spaceplane was carried by an Atlas V rocket in May 2015, and a Delta IV orbited the WGS-7 satellite in July 2015. The fourth MUOS satellite was orbited by an Atlas V in September 2015. ULA's 100th consecutive successful liftoff was completed on October 2, 2015, when an Atlas V rocket orbited a Mexican Satellite System communications satellite on behalf of the Secretariat of Communications and Transportation. The classified NROL-55 satellite was launched by an Atlas V rocket several days later. Atlas V rockets launched GPS Block IIF satellites and the Cygnus cargo spacecraft in November 2015 and December 2015, respectively.

In 2016, Delta IV rockets carried the NROL-45 satellite and Air Force Space Command 6 mission in February 2016 and August 2016, respectively. During a launch of the Atlas V rocket on March 22, 2016, a minor first-stage anomaly led to shutdown of the first-stage engine approximately five seconds before anticipated. The Centaur upper stage was able to compensate by firing for approximately one minute longer than planned using its reserved fuel margin. Atlas V rockets carried MUOS-5 in June 2016, NROL-61 satellites in July 2016, and the OSIRIS-REx spacecraft in September 2016.

ULA launched multiple satellites in late 2016. The weather satellite Geostationary Operational Environmental Satellite (GOES-R) was carried in November 2016, as was the WorldView-4 imaging satellite. In December 2016, the Wideband Global SATCOM's eighth satellite WGS-8 was launched on a Delta IV Medium rocket, and an Atlas V carried the EchoStar XIX communications satellite on behalf of Hughes Communications. In March 2017, WGS-9 was orbited by a Delta IV. Atlas V rockets carried NRO satellites, TDRS-M, and a Cygnus cargo capsule in 2017. The weather satellite NOAA-20 (JPSS-1) was launched by a Delta II rocket in November 2017.

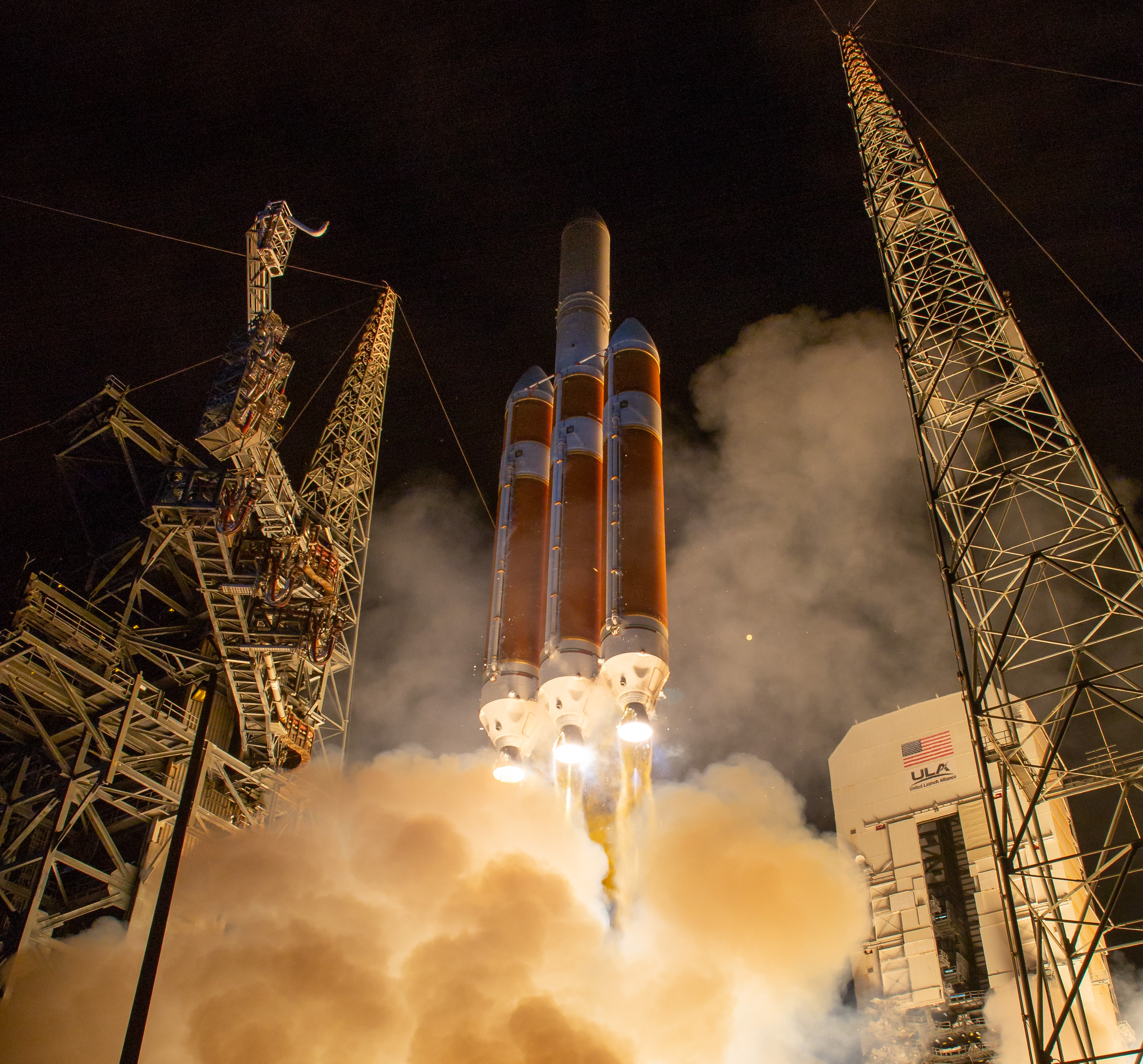
Delta IV Heavy launch with the Parker Solar Probe

An Atlas V carried the SBIRS-GEO 4 military satellite in January 2018. The Atlas V's launch of NASA's InSight to Mars in 2018 was the first interplanetary probe to depart from the U.S. West Coast. In August 2018, a Delta IV Heavy launched Parker Solar Probe, NASA's solar space probe that was to visit and study the Sun's outer corona in August 2018. It was also the Delta IV Heavy with a Star-48BV kick stage, and the highest-ever spacecraft velocity. The company launched the final Delta II rocket, carrying ICESat-2 from Vandenberg Air Force Base SLC-2 on September 15, 2018. This marks the last launch of a Delta family rocket based on the original Thor IRBM. On August 22, 2019, ULA launched its last Delta IV Medium rocket for the GPS III Magellan project. An Atlas V carried Boeing's Starliner Orbital Flight Test (OFT) mission for NASA in December 2019.

=== 2020–2024 ===
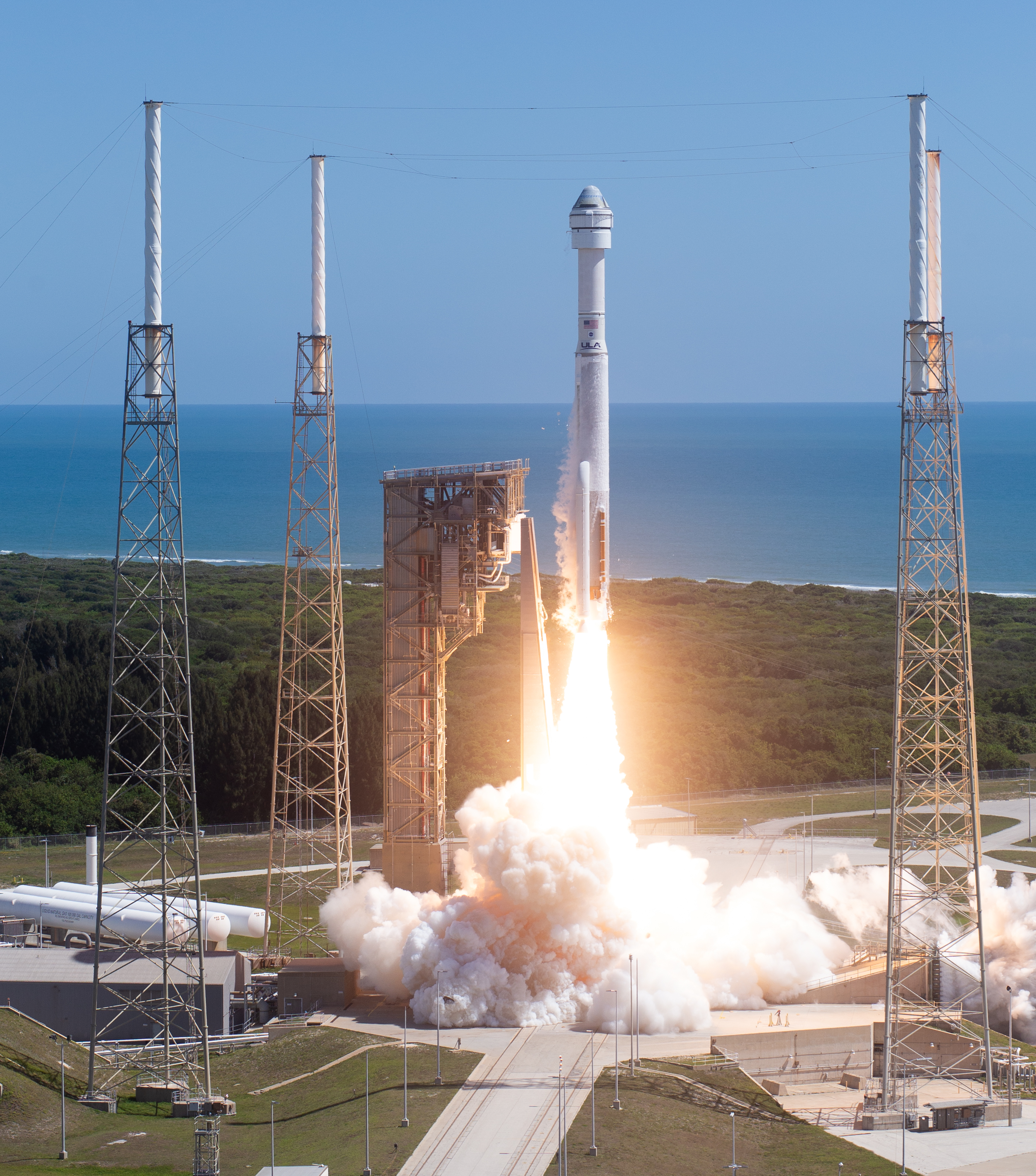
Boeing Starliner Calypso launches on the Crew Flight Test atop an Atlas V rocket

Between 2020 and 2024, Atlas V continued to fly a mix of scientific, commercial, and national security missions. Notable payloads included ESA's Solar Orbiter in February 2020, NASA's Mars 2020 mission with the Perseverance rover and Ingenuity helicopter in July 2020, and the Lucy asteroid probe in October 2021. In September 2021, Atlas V launched Landsat 9 for NASA and the USGS, while in October 2023 it carried the first two prototype satellites for Amazon's Project Kuiper, the first of 9 Kuiper launches booked on Atlas V and 38 on Vulcan Centaur.

Atlas V also served as the launch vehicle for the Boeing Starliner crewed spacecraft program. Following the partial failure of the first Orbital Flight Test in 2019, ULA launched Orbital Flight Test 2 in May 2022, placing Starliner into orbit for a successful first docking with the International Space Station. The rocket was again used for the Crew Flight Test in June 2024, carrying two NASA astronauts to the station.

During the same period, the last Delta IV Heavy missions marked the retirement of the Delta rocket family. Four flights between 2020 and 2024 carried classified payloads for the National Reconnaissance Office from both Cape Canaveral and Vandenberg, with the final mission launching in April 2024.

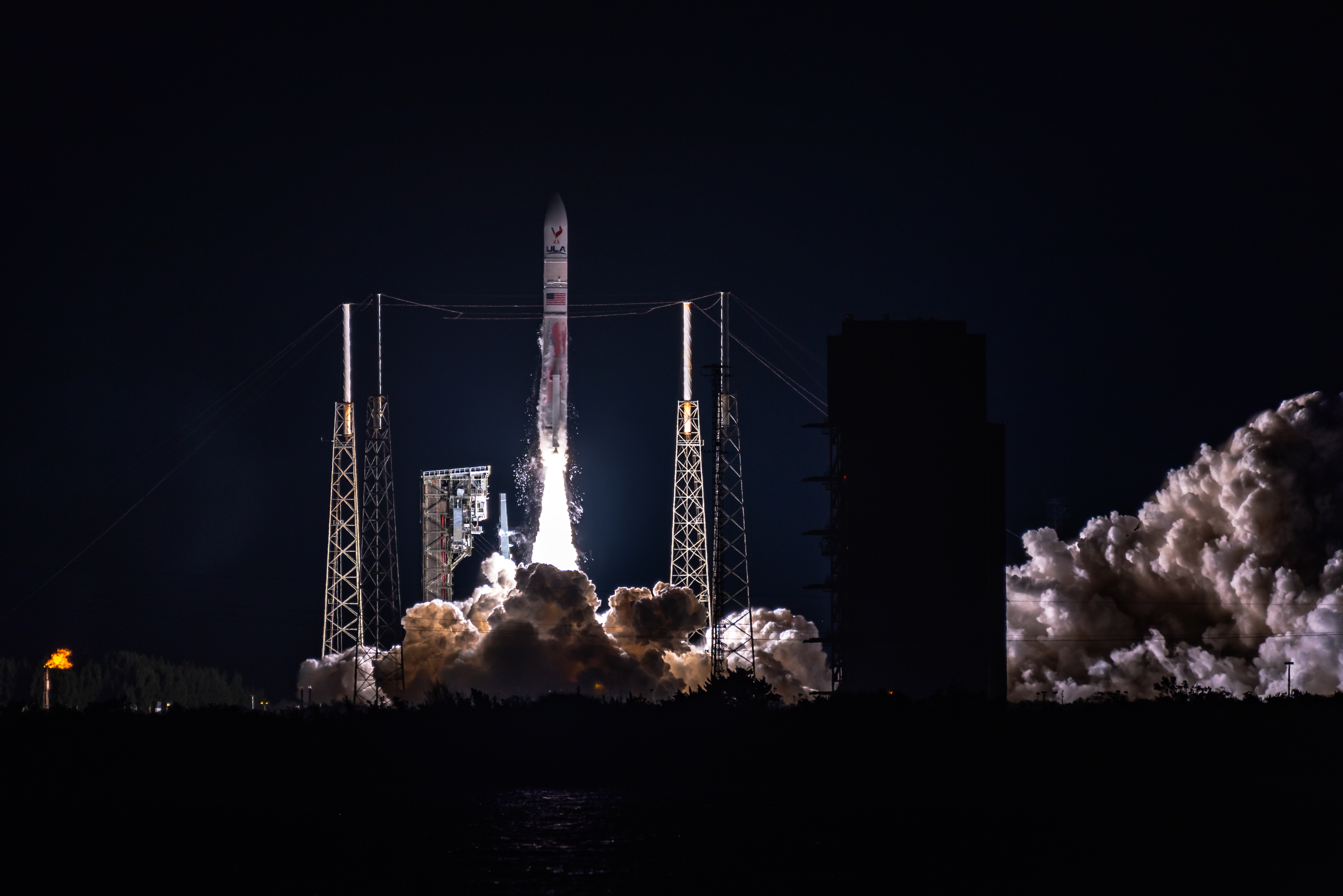
Maiden flight of the Vulcan Centuar, carrying the Peregrine lunar lander

The Vulcan Centaur rocket flew for the first time on January 8, 2024. The inaugural mission placed Astrobotic's Peregrine lunar lander on a trans-lunar trajectory and tested the upper stage's ability to perform long-duration burns. The rocket's second certification flight on October 4, 2024, launched with a mass simulator after delays to its intended payload, Sierra Nevada Corporation's Dream Chaser spacecraft. An anomaly with one of the solid rocket boosters caused a partial loss of thrust, but the vehicle compensated and reached orbit. Together, these two flights completed Vulcan's certification for future national security launches.

=== 2025–present ===
In 2025, ULA had a substantial backlog of military/security launches for Vulcan Centaur. As of August 2025 ULA are "aiming for about two launches per month across its Atlas and Vulcan fleets in 2025 and 2026", but a total of nine launches in 2025. There were a total of six launches in 2025: one Vulcan Centaur and five Atlas V.

In November 2026, the fifth flight of Vulcan Centaur failed to reach orbit, the first full launch failure for ULA.

== Infrastructure ==
=== Headquarters and manufacturing ===
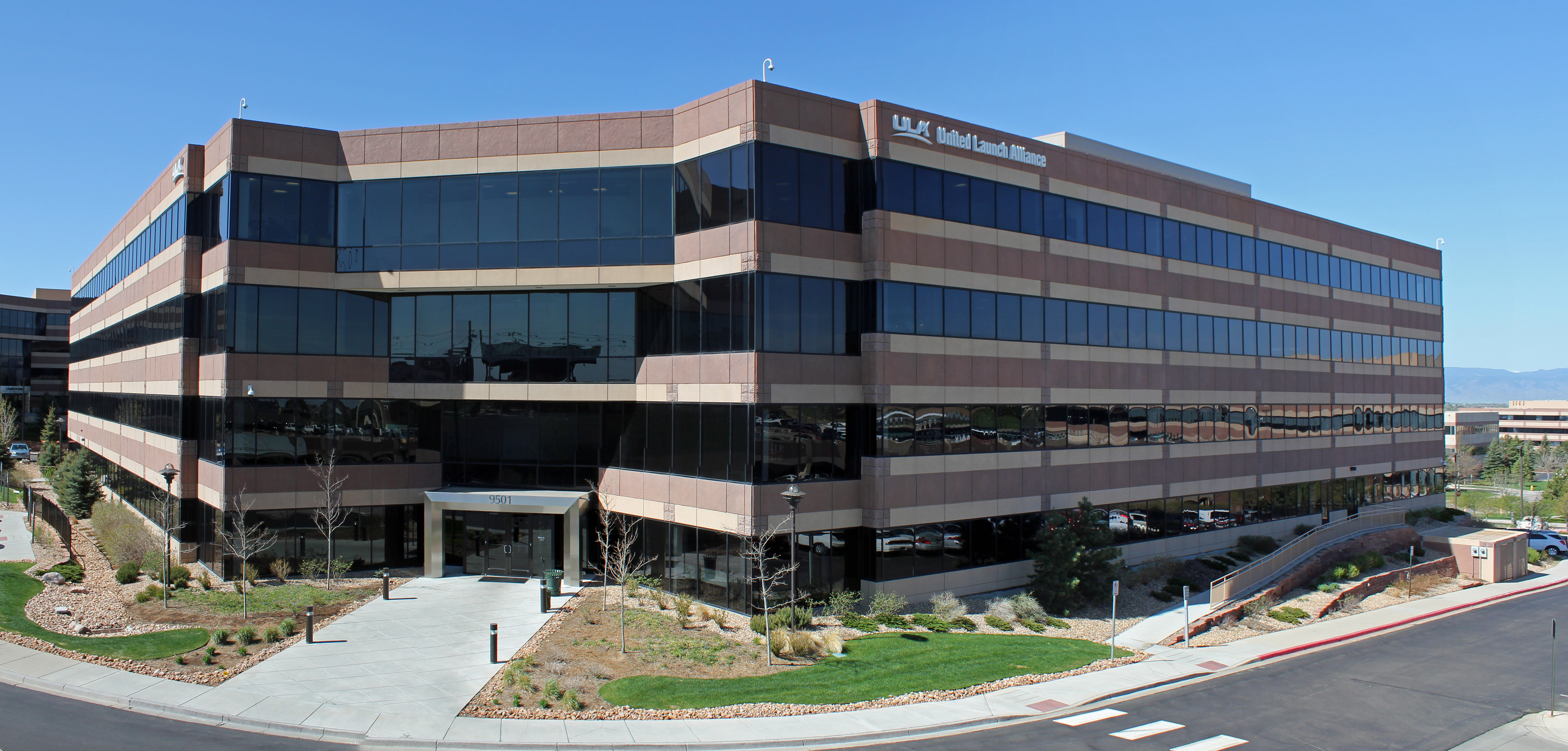
ULA's headquarters building in Centennial, Colorado

ULA's headquarters in Centennial, Colorado is responsible for program management, rocket engineering, testing, and launch support functions. ULA's largest factory is 1.6 million square feet (150,000 m^{2}) and located in Decatur, Alabama. In 2015, the company announced the opening of an engineering and propulsion test center in Pueblo, Colorado.

Until 2024 the company operated a factory in Harlingen, Texas to fabricate and assemble components for the Atlas V rocket.

=== Launch facilities ===
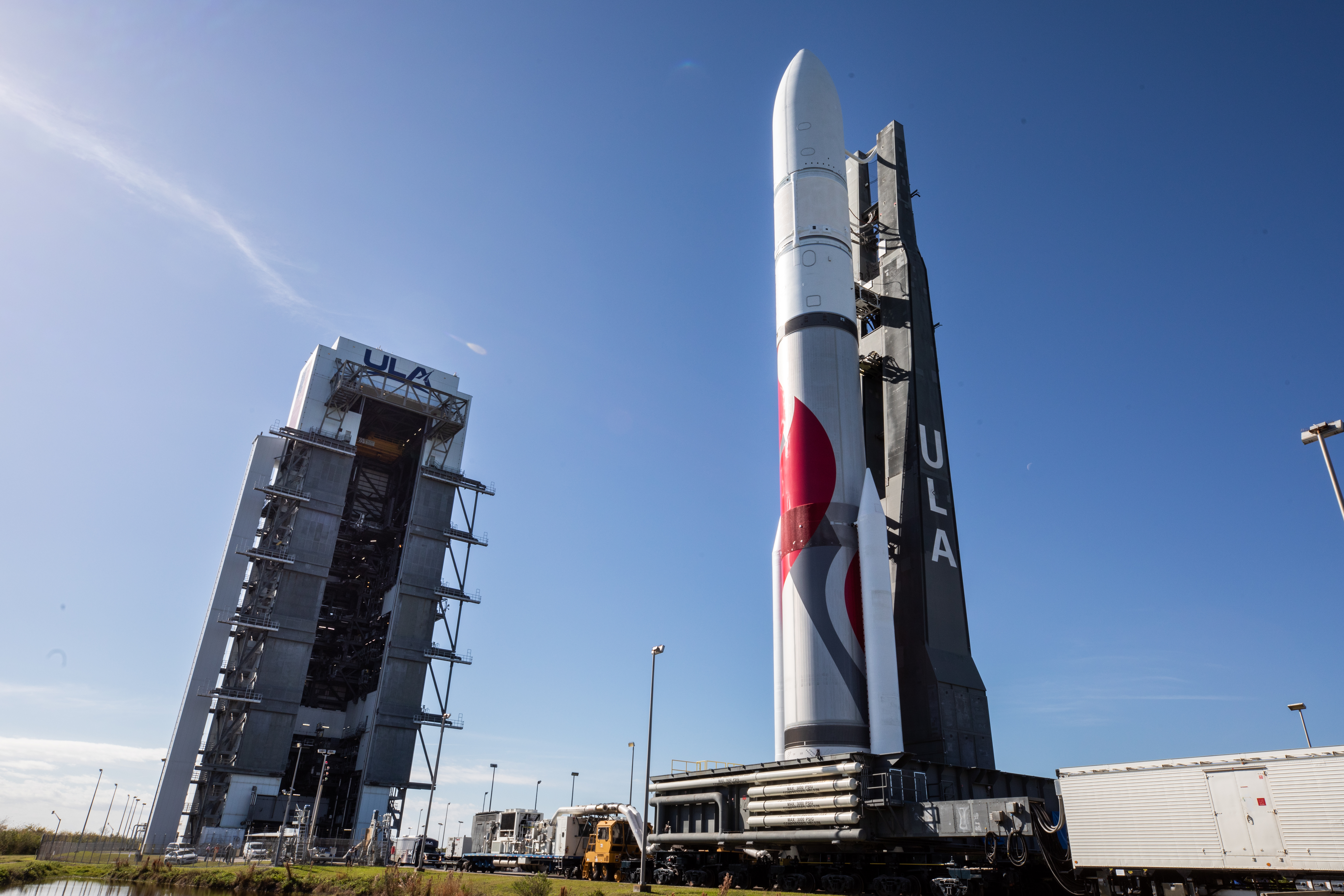
Vulcan rocket atop a mobile launcher platform rolls out of the Vertical Integration Facility (VIF-G) at SLC-41

As of June 2024, United Launch Alliance (ULA) operates one active launch facility: Space Launch Complex 41 (SLC-41) at the Cape Canaveral Space Force Station in Cape Canaveral, Florida. Launches from Space Launch Complex 3 (SLC-3) at the Vandenberg Space Force Base near Lompoc, California ended in 2022 but will resume after the pad is converted for use by Vulcan. Launches from Cape Canaveral are typically directed eastward to take advantage of Earth’s rotation for equatorial trajectories, while Vandenberg is primarily used for missions requiring a polar orbit, such as Earth-imaging and weather satellites.

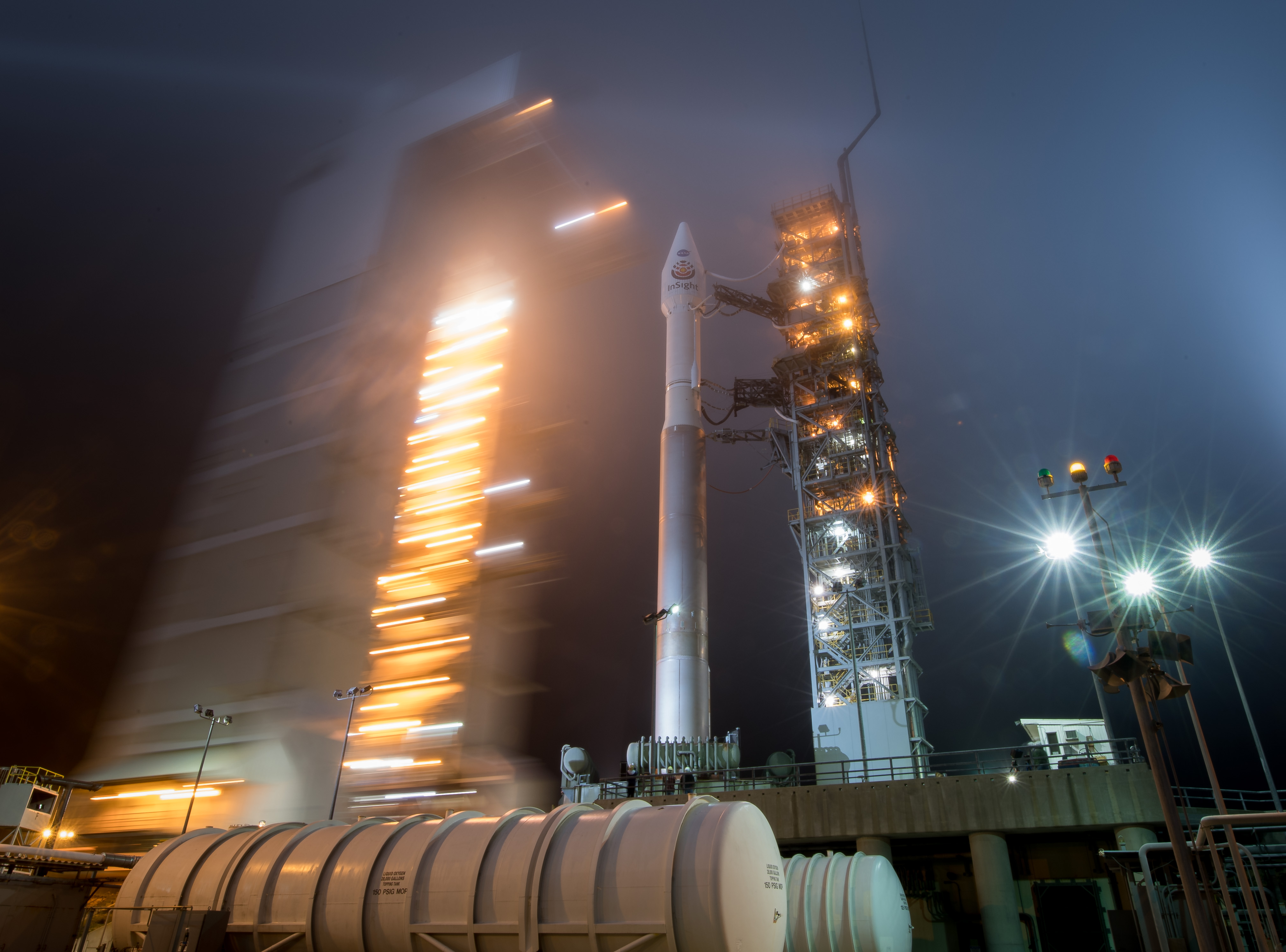
The mobile service building rolls back from an Atlas V rocket at SLC-3

The two sites employ different methods for vehicle stacking and launch. At SLC-41, rockets are stacked on a mobile launcher platform inside a nearby Vertical Integration Facility (VIF) and then rolled to the pad, where they are connected to a fixed tower equipped with a crew access arm for human spaceflight missions. At SLC-3, rockets are assembled vertically on a fixed launch pad, with a mobile service building that envelops the pad during integration and is rolled back before liftoff.

To support a higher launch cadence, particularly for Amazon’s Project Kuiper constellation, ULA is expanding its infrastructure at Cape Canaveral. The company acquired the former Solid Motor Assembly and Readiness Facility (SMARF), originally built for the Titan IVB program, and repurposed it as the Spaceflight Processing Operations Center (SPOC). Initially used as a warehouse for construction of two mobile launcher platforms for Vulcan, the SPOC is now being converted into a second integration facility, designated VIF-A (Amazon Vertical Integration Facility). Planned upgrades include raising the roof by 45 feet, adding storage space for a mobile launcher platform, and creating an offline vertical integration (OVI) cell to allow parallel processing of the Centaur V upper stage and Vulcan booster prior to stacking. Once VIF-A is operational, the existing VIF will be redesignated VIF-G (Government Vertical Integration Facility) and primarily support national security launches.

Since its formation in 2006, ULA has reduced its number of active pads from seven to two. At Cape Canaveral it previously operated two pads at SLC-17 and one at SLC-37 for Delta launches, while at Vandenberg it formerly operated one pad at SLC-2 and another at SLC-6, also for Delta missions.

== See also ==
- Aerojet Rocketdyne (RS-68 and RL10)
- Blue Origin (BE-4)
- National Security Space Launch
- Northrop Grumman Innovation Systems (Graphite-Epoxy Motor)
- RUAG Space (payload fairings, composite structures)

Other launch vehicle providers

- SpaceX
- United Space Alliance
- Deep Space Transport LLC
- Arianespace
- Mitsubishi Heavy Industries
- Roscosmos
