= Vertical Integration Building =

Former building at Cape Canaveral Space Force Station, Florida

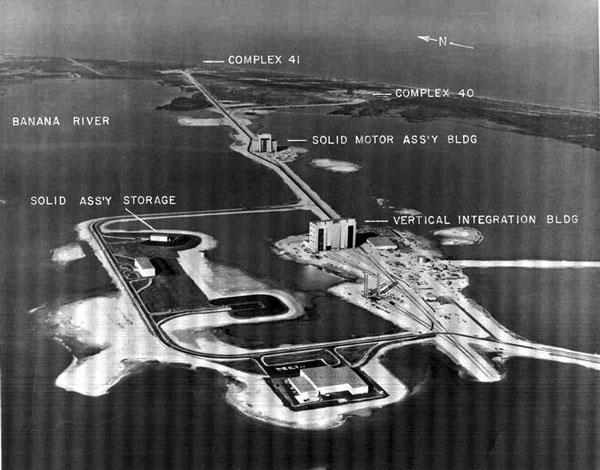
- Diagram of the ITL Complex, showing the VIB in the foreground.
- Interactive map of the Vertical Integration Building area

General information
- Status: Demolished
- Location: Brevard County, Florida, United States
- Coordinates: 28.4916°N 80.5794°W
- Opened: 1965
- Demolished: 2006
- Owner: United States Air Force

Height
- Height: 240 ft (73 m)

The Vertical Integration Building was a building at Cape Canaveral Space Force Station in Florida, located at the far south end of the industrial area supporting SLC-40 and SLC-41. The building was one of the facilities of the Integrate-Transfer-Launch Complex that was used to support Titan III and Titan IV launches. These expendable launch systems were operated by the United States Air Force, both at CCAFS and at Vandenberg Air Force Base in California from 1965 to 2005. Several Titan rockets could be vertically integrated at the same time inside the Vertical Integration Building, using four high bays/cells arranged in a line on the southern face. In that respect it was a precursor to the Vehicle Assembly Building used for the Saturn V and Space Shuttle. It also featured connected buildings for payload integration.

In operation with Titan III, the first, second and third stage and their payload were assembled on the mobile launch platform in one of the high bays, then departed heading southward, later reversing direction and heading northward towards the Solid Motor Assembly Building (SMAB), passing by the VIB's east side. For the Titan IV, the VIB only stacked the first and second stages, with the SRBs being handled at the Solid Motor Assembly Readiness Facility (SMARF) and the payload with its upper stage being added at the launch pad.

The Vertical Integration Building was dismantled in 2006 after the Titan IV retired.

== See also ==
- Horizontal Integration Facility
- Integrate-Transfer-Launch Complex
