= List of spaceflight launches in July–December 2024 =

This article lists orbital and suborbital launches planned for the second half of the year 2024, including launches planned for 2024 without a specific launch date.

For all other spaceflight activities, see 2024 in spaceflight. For launches in the first half of 2024, see List of spaceflight launches in January–June 2024.

== Orbital launches ==
- ← Jan
- Feb
- Mar
- Apr
- May
- Jun
- Jul
- Aug
- Sep
- Oct
- Nov
- Dec →

=== July ===
Date and time (UTC)	Rocket	Flight number	Launch site		LSP	
Date and time (UTC)	Payload (⚀ = CubeSat)	Operator	Orbit	Function	Decay (UTC)	Outcome
Date and time (UTC)	Remarks					
1 July; 03:06:42	(Japan) H3-22S	F3	(Japan) Tanegashima LA-Y2		(Japan) JAXA	
1 July; 03:06:42	(Japan) ALOS-4 (Daichi 4)	JAXA	Low Earth (SSO)	Earth observation	In orbit	Operational
1 July; 03:06:42	First Operational flight of H3 rocket. ALOS-4 (Daichi 4) will replace the ALOS-2 (Daichi 2) satellite, which was launched in 2014.					
3 July; 08:55	(United States) Falcon 9 Block 5	Starlink Group 8-9	(United States) Cape Canaveral SLC-40		(United States) SpaceX	
3 July; 08:55	(United States) Starlink × 7	SpaceX	Low Earth	Communications	In orbit	Operational
3 July; 08:55	(United States) Starlink-D2C × 13	SpaceX	Low Earth	Communications	In orbit	Operational
4 July; 04:03	(United States) Firefly Alpha	FLTA005	(United States) Vandenberg SLC-2W		(United States) Firefly	
4 July; 04:03	⚀ (United States) CatSat	University of Arizona	Low Earth (SSO)	Technology demonstration	In orbit	Operational
4 July; 04:03	⚀ (United States) KUbeSat-1	University of Kansas	Low Earth (SSO)	Ionospheric research	In orbit	Operational
4 July; 04:03	⚀ (United States) MESAT 1	University of Maine	Low Earth (SSO)	Atmospheric science	In orbit	Operational
4 July; 04:03	⚀ (United States) R5-S2-2.0	NASA Johnson	Low Earth (SSO)	Technology demonstration	In orbit	Operational
4 July; 04:03	⚀ (United States) R5-S4	NASA Johnson	Low Earth (SSO)	Technology demonstration	In orbit	Operational
4 July; 04:03	⚀ (United States) Serenity	Teachers in Space	Low Earth (SSO)	Educational	In orbit	Operational
4 July; 04:03	⚀ (United States) SOC-i	University of Washington	Low Earth (SSO)	Technology demonstration	In orbit	Operational
4 July; 04:03	⚀ (United States) TechEdSat-11	NASA Ames	Low Earth (SSO)	Technology demonstration	In orbit	Operational
4 July; 04:03	NASA Venture Class Launch Services 2 (VCLS 2) Mission Two, officially known as VCLS Demo-2FB. The ELaNa 43 mission, consisting of 8 CubeSats, will launch on this flight. Mission designated "Noise of Summer".					
4 July; 22:49	(China) Long March 6A	6A-Y7	(China) Taiyuan LA-9A		(China) CASC	
4 July; 22:49	(China) Tianhui 5C	CNSA	Low Earth (SSO)	Earth observation	In orbit	Operational
4 July; 22:49	(China) Tianhui 5D	CNSA	Low Earth (SSO)	Earth observation	In orbit	Operational
8 July; 23:30	(United States) Falcon 9 Block 5	F9-353	(United States) Cape Canaveral SLC-40		(United States) SpaceX	
8 July; 23:30	(Turkey) Türksat 6A	Türksat	GTO to Geosynchronous	Communications	In orbit	Operational
8 July; 23:30	325th Consecutive successful flight of Falcon 9 rocket since 2016. First domestically produced Turkish communications satellite.					
9 July; 19:00	(France) Ariane 6 A62	VA262; FM-01	(France) Kourou ELA-4		ESA	
9 July; 19:00	(France) (Germany) Nyx Bikini	The Exploration Company	Low Earth	Reentry capsule / Technology demonstration	In orbit	Precluded
9 July; 19:00	(France) SpaceCase SC-X01	ArianeGroup	Low Earth	Reentry capsule / Technology demonstration	In orbit	Precluded
9 July; 19:00	⚀ (Spain) ³Cat-4	BarcelonaTech	Low Earth	GNSS radio occultation	In orbit	Operational
9 July; 19:00	⚀ (United States) CURIE A, B	NASA	Low Earth	Technology demonstration	In orbit	Operational
9 July; 19:00	⚀ (Germany) (Greece) Curium One (Major Tom)	PTS / Libre Space Foundation	Low Earth	Technology demonstration	In orbit	Operational
9 July; 19:00	⚀ (Slovakia) GRBBeta	TUKE / Spacemanic	Low Earth	Gamma-ray burst astronomy	In orbit	Operational
9 July; 19:00	⚀ (Portugal) ISTSat-1	University of Lisbon	Low Earth	ADS-B / Technology demonstration	In orbit	Operational
9 July; 19:00	⚀ (France) Méditerranée (ROBUSTA-3A)	University of Montpellier	Low Earth	Meteorology	In orbit	Operational
9 July; 19:00	⚀ (Germany) OOV-Cube	TU Berlin	Low Earth	Technology demonstration / IoT	In orbit	Operational
9 July; 19:00	⚀ (Poland) (Germany) Replicator	Orbital Matter	Low Earth	Technology demonstration / Space manufacturing	In orbit	Operational
9 July; 19:00	Maiden flight of Ariane 6. Failure of the auxiliary propulsion system precluded the third relight of the Vinci upper stage, causing the two reentry capsules and upper stage to be stranded in their 580-km circular orbit. Nine satellites, two reentry capsules, and five onboard experiments were launched. The ELaNa-48 mission, consisting of the two CURIE cubesats, was launched on this flight. The two CURIE cubesats were launched as a single spacecraft and separated in orbit (ESA Rideshares - Demo Flight).					
10 July; 23:40	(China) Hyperbola-1	Y8	(China) Jiuquan LS-95A		(China) i-Space	
10 July; 23:40	(China) Yunyao-1 15-17	CGSTL	Low Earth (SSO)	Meteorology	10 July	Launch failure
12 July; 02:35	(United States) Falcon 9 Block 5	Starlink Group 9-3	(United States) Vandenberg SLC-4E		(United States) SpaceX	
12 July; 02:35	(United States) Starlink × 7	SpaceX	Low Earth	Communications	13 July	Launch failure
12 July; 02:35	(United States) Starlink-D2C × 13	SpaceX	Low Earth	Communications	13 July	Launch failure
12 July; 02:35	The Falcon 9 second-stage engine failed to complete its second ignition due to a liquid oxygen leak, causing the planned orbit to be missed and the deployment of the Starlink satellites in an unusable orbit.					
19 July; 03:03	(China) Long March 4B	4B-Y58	(China) Taiyuan LA-9		(China) CASC	
19 July; 03:03	(China) Gaofen 11-05	CNSA	Low Earth (SSO)	Earth Observation	In orbit	Operational
27 July; 05:45	(United States) Falcon 9 Block 5	Starlink Group 10-9	(United States) Kennedy LC-39A		(United States) SpaceX	
27 July; 05:45	(United States) Starlink × 23	SpaceX	Low Earth	Communications	In orbit	Operational
27 July; 05:45	Return to flight of the Falcon 9 following the Starlink Group 9-3 second-stage failure occurred on 12 July.					
28 July; 05:09	(United States) Falcon 9 Block 5	Starlink Group 10-4	(United States) Cape Canaveral SLC-40		(United States) SpaceX	
28 July; 05:09	(United States) Starlink × 23	SpaceX	Low Earth	Communications	In orbit	Operational
28 July; 09:22	(United States) Falcon 9 Block 5	Starlink Group 9-4	(United States) Vandenberg SLC-4E		(United States) SpaceX	
28 July; 09:22	(United States) Starlink × 8	SpaceX	Low Earth	Communications	In orbit	Operational
28 July; 09:22	(United States) Starlink-D2C × 13	SpaceX	Low Earth	Communications	In orbit	Operational
30 July; 10:45	(United States) Atlas V 551	AV-101	(United States) Cape Canaveral SLC-41		(United States) ULA	
30 July; 10:45	(United States) USA-396	USSF	Geosynchronous	TBA	In orbit	Operational
30 July; 10:45	(United States) USA-397	USSF	Geosynchronous	TBA	In orbit	Operational
30 July; 10:45	(United States) USA-398	USSF	Geosynchronous	TBA	In orbit	Operational
30 July; 10:45	(United States) USA-566	USSF	Geosynchronous	TBA	In orbit	Operational
30 July; 10:45	(United States) USA-567	USSF	Geosynchronous	TBA	In orbit	Operational
30 July; 10:45	(United States) USA-568	USSF	Geosynchronous	TBA	In orbit	Operational
30 July; 10:45	(United States) USA-569	USSF	Geosynchronous	TBA	In orbit	Operational
30 July; 10:45	(United States) USA 667	USSF	Geosynchronous	TBA	In orbit	Operational
30 July; 10:45	USSF-51 Mission. Last National Security Space Launch (NSSL) mission on Atlas V as ULA transitions to the next generation Vulcan rocket for continued access to space. Launch vehicle was switched from Vulcan Centaur to Atlas V at ULA's request. This is ULA's 100th national security Space launch.					

- ← Jan
- Feb
- Mar
- Apr
- May
- Jun
- Jul
- Aug
- Sep
- Oct
- Nov
- Dec →

=== August ===
Date and time (UTC)	Rocket	Flight number	Launch site		LSP	
Date and time (UTC)	Payload (⚀ = CubeSat)	Operator	Orbit	Function	Decay (UTC)	Outcome
Date and time (UTC)	Remarks					
1 August; 13:14	(China) Long March 3B/E	3B-Y97	(China) Xichang LC-2		(China) CASC	
1 August; 13:14	(China) Weixing Hulianwang Gaogui-02	APT Satellite Holdings / CAST	GTO to Geosynchronous	Communications	In orbit	Operational
1 August; 13:14	It is part of the Guowang (Xingwang) constellation.					
2 August; 05:01	(United States) Falcon 9 Block 5	Starlink Group 10-6	(United States) Kennedy LC-39A		(United States) SpaceX	
2 August; 05:01	(United States) Starlink × 23	SpaceX	Low Earth	Communications	In orbit	Operational
2 August; 16:39	(United States) Electron	"Owl For One, One For Owl"	(New Zealand) Mahia LC-1B		(United States) Rocket Lab	
2 August; 16:39	(Japan) StriX-4	Synspective	Low Earth	Earth observation	In orbit	Operational
2 August; 16:39	Fifth of 16 dedicated launches for Synspective's StriX constellation.					
4 August; 07:24	(United States) Falcon 9 Block 5	Starlink Group 11-1	(United States) Vandenberg SLC-4E		(United States) SpaceX	
4 August; 07:24	(United States) Starlink × 23	SpaceX	Low Earth	Communications	In orbit	Operational
4 August; 07:24	First launch of Starlink Group 11 Satellites.					
4 August; 15:02	(United States) Falcon 9 Block 5	F9-360	(United States) Cape Canaveral SLC-40		(United States) SpaceX	
4 August; 15:02	(United States) Cygnus NG-21; S.S. Francis R. "Dick" Scobee	NASA	Low Earth (ISS)	ISS logistics	30 March 2025; 10:15	Successful
4 August; 15:02	⚀ (Australia) Binar-2, -3, -4	Curtin University	Low Earth	Technology demonstration	5–11 November	Successful
4 August; 15:02	⚀ (United States) CySat 1	Iowa State University	Low Earth	Technology demonstration	14 January 2025	Spacecraft failure
4 August; 15:02	⚀ (United States) DORA	Arizona State University	Low Earth	Technology demonstration	30 November	Successful
4 August; 15:02	⚀ (Japan) EMMA (CosmoGirl-Sat)	Cosmo Girl Amateur Radio Club	Low Earth	Amateur radio	9 December	Successful
4 August; 15:02	⚀ (Japan) SaganSat 0	Saga Prefecture	Low Earth	Educational	15 December	Spacecraft failure
4 August; 15:02	⚀ (Japan) SAKURA	Chiba Institute of Technology	Low Earth	Educational	1 December	Successful
4 August; 15:02	⚀ (Japan) Wisseed Sat	Wisseed-the-terra	Low Earth	Educational	22 October	Successful
4 August; 15:02	Second of three Cygnus spacecraft to be launched via Falcon 9. The ELaNa-52 mission, consisting of the CySat 1 and DORA cubesats, was launched on this flight. Emma, SaganSat 0, Sakura, Wisseed Sat, Binar-2, -3, -4 were deployed into orbit from the ISS on 29 August 2024. CySat-1 and DORA were deployed into orbit from the ISS on 8 October 2024.					
6 August; 06:42	(China) Long March 6A	6A-Y21 / G60 Polar Group 01	(China) Taiyuan LA-9A		(China) CASC	
6 August; 06:42	(China) Qianfan × 18	SSST	Low Earth (Polar)	Communications	In orbit	Operational
6 August; 06:42	First batch of the Qianfan (Thousand Sails) broadband megaconstellation, formerly known as G60 Starlink constellation. Chinese state media reported that the launch was a complete success, however, like previous Long March 6A flights, mission ended with hundreds of pieces of trackable debris.					
10 August; 12:50	(United States) Falcon 9 Block 5	Starlink Group 8-3	(United States) Cape Canaveral SLC-40		(United States) SpaceX	
10 August; 12:50	(United States) Starlink × 8	SpaceX	Low Earth	Communications	In orbit	Operational
10 August; 12:50	(United States) Starlink-D2C × 13	SpaceX	Low Earth	Communications	In orbit	Operational
11 August; 11:15	(United States) Electron	"A Sky Full Of SARs"	(New Zealand) Mahia LC-1B		(United States) Rocket Lab	
11 August; 11:15	(United States) Acadia-3 (Capella-13)	Capella Space	Low Earth	Earth observation	In orbit	Operational
11 August; 11:15	Third of four dedicated launches for Capella Space with Acadia satellites.					
12 August; 02:02	(United States) Falcon 9 Block 5	F9-362	(United States) Vandenberg SLC-4E		(United States) SpaceX	
12 August; 02:02	(Norway) (United States) (United Kingdom) ASBM-1 (GX-10A / EPS-R 1)	Space Norway / United States Space Force / Inmarsat / ViaSat	Highly elliptical (Molniya)	Communications	In orbit	Operational
12 August; 02:02	(Norway) (United States) (United Kingdom) ASBM-2 (GX-10B / EPS-R 2)	Space Norway / United States Space Force / Inmarsat / ViaSat	Highly elliptical (Molniya)	Communications	In orbit	Operational
12 August; 10:37	(United States) Falcon 9 Block 5	Starlink Group 10-7	(United States) Kennedy LC-39A		(United States) SpaceX	
12 August; 10:37	(United States) Starlink × 23	SpaceX	Low Earth	Communications	In orbit	Operational
15 August; 03:20	(Russia) Soyuz-2.1a		(Kazakhstan) Baikonur Site 31/6		(Russia) Roscosmos	
15 August; 03:20	(Russia) Progress MS-28 / 89P	Roscosmos	Low Earth (ISS)	ISS logistics	25 February 2025; 23:23	Successful
15 August; 13:00	(United States) Falcon 9 Block 5	F9-364	(United States) Cape Canaveral SLC-40		(United States) SpaceX	
15 August; 13:00	(United States) WorldView Legion 3	Maxar Technologies	Low Earth	Earth observation	In orbit	Operational
15 August; 13:00	(United States) WorldView Legion 4	Maxar Technologies	Low Earth	Earth observation	In orbit	Operational
16 August; 03:47	(India) SSLV	D3	(India) Satish Dhawan FLP		(India) ISRO	
16 August; 03:47	(India) EOS-08 (Microsat-2C)	ISRO	Low Earth	Earth observation	In orbit	Operational
16 August; 03:47	⚀ (India) SR-0 DEMOSAT	Space Kidz India	Low Earth	TBA	3 November	Successful
16 August; 07:35	(China) Long March 4B	4B-Y72	(China) Xichang LC-3		(China) CASC	
16 August; 07:35	(China) Yaogan 43-01A	CAS	Low Earth	Reconnaissance	In orbit	Operational
16 August; 07:35	(China) Yaogan 43-01B	CAS	Low Earth	Reconnaissance	In orbit	Operational
16 August; 07:35	(China) Yaogan 43-01C	CAS	Low Earth	Reconnaissance	In orbit	Operational
16 August; 07:35	(China) Yaogan 43-01D	CAS	Low Earth	Reconnaissance	In orbit	Operational
16 August; 07:35	(China) Yaogan 43-01E	CAS	Low Earth	Reconnaissance	In orbit	Operational
16 August; 07:35	(China) Yaogan 43-01F	CAS	Low Earth	Reconnaissance	In orbit	Operational
16 August; 07:35	(China) Yaogan 43-01G	CAS	Low Earth	Reconnaissance	In orbit	Operational
16 August; 07:35	(China) Yaogan 43-01H	CAS	Low Earth	Reconnaissance	In orbit	Operational
16 August; 07:35	(China) Yaogan 43-01I	CAS	Low Earth	Reconnaissance	In orbit	Operational
16 August; 07:35	First launch of Long March 4B from Xichang.					
16 August; 18:56	(United States) Falcon 9 Block 5	Transporter-11	(United States) Vandenberg SLC-4E		(United States) SpaceX	
16 August; 18:56	(United States) Acadia-5 (Capella-15)	Capella Space	Low Earth (SSO)	Earth observation	In orbit	Operational
16 August; 18:56	Arctic Weather Satellite (AWS)	ESA / EUMETSAT	Low Earth (SSO)	Meteorology / Technology demonstration	In orbit	Operational
16 August; 18:56	(Poland) EagleEye	POLSA	Low Earth (SSO)	Earth observation	In orbit	Operational
16 August; 18:56	(United States) GNOMES-5	PlanetiQ	Low Earth (SSO)	Radio occultation	In orbit	Operational
16 August; 18:56	(United States) Hawk 10A, 10B, 10C	HawkEye 360	Low Earth (SSO)	SIGNIT	In orbit	Operational
16 August; 18:56	(Finland) ICEYE × 4	ICEYE	Low Earth (SSO)	Earth observation	In orbit	Operational
16 August; 18:56	(Italy) ION SCV-012 Magnificent Monica	D-Orbit	Low Earth (SSO)	Space Tug	In orbit	Operational
16 August; 18:56	(Spain) LUR-1	AVS	Low Earth (SSO)	Earth observation	In orbit	Operational
16 August; 18:56	(Argentina) ÑuSat 48, 49, 50	Satellogic	Low Earth (SSO)	Earth observation	In orbit	Operational
16 August; 18:56	(Japan) QPS-SAR-8 (Amateru-IV)	iQPS	Low Earth (SSO)	Earth observation	In orbit	Operational
16 August; 18:56	(United States) Tanager 1	Carbon Mapper / Planet Labs / JPL	Low Earth (SSO)	Earth observation	In orbit	Operational
16 August; 18:56	(United Kingdom) Tyche	UKSC	Low Earth (SSO)	Reconnaissance	In orbit	Operational
16 August; 18:56	(United States) Umbra-09, 10	Umbra	Low Earth (SSO)	Earth observation	In orbit	Operational
16 August; 18:56	(United States) YAM-7	Loft Orbital	Low Earth (SSO)	Payload hosting	In orbit	Operational
16 August; 18:56	⚀ (France) BRO-14, 15	UnseenLabs	Low Earth (SSO)	SIGNIT	In orbit	Operational
16 August; 18:56	⚀ (Indonesia) CAKRA-1	KKP	Low Earth (SSO)	Earth observation	In orbit	Operational
16 August; 18:56	⚀ (Turkey) Connecta IoT × 4	Plan-S	Low Earth (SSO)	IoT	In orbit	Operational
16 August; 18:56	⚀ (Australia) CUAVA-2	University of Sydney	Low Earth (SSO)	Earth observation / GNSS reflectometry	In orbit	Operational
16 August; 18:56	⚀ (United States) Deimos	Aethero Space	Low Earth (SSO)	Earth observation	In orbit	Operational
16 August; 18:56	⚀ (Germany) ERNST	Fraunhofer EMI	Low Earth (SSO)	Earth observation	In orbit	Operational
16 August; 18:56	⚀ (United States) Flock-4BE × 36	Planet Labs	Low Earth (SSO)	Earth observation	In orbit	Operational
16 August; 18:56	⚀ (Senegal) GaindéSat‑1A	Senegalese Space Project (SENSAT)	Low Earth (SSO)	Educational / Earth observation	In orbit	Operational
16 August; 18:56	⚀ (Sweden) GNA-3	Rymdavdelningen - Space Division	Low Earth (SSO)	Military communications	In orbit	Operational
16 August; 18:56	⚀ (United States) Hubble 3 (Lemur-2 190)	Spire Global / Hubble Network	Low Earth (SSO)	Earth observation	In orbit	Operational
16 August; 18:56	⚀ (Finland) Hyperfield-1A	Kuva Space	Low Earth (SSO)	Earth observation	In orbit	Operational
16 August; 18:56	⚀ (Norway) HYSPO-2	NTNU	Low Earth (SSO)	Earth observation	In orbit	Operational
16 August; 18:56	⚀ (Italy) Iperdrone.0	CIRA	Low Earth (SSO)	Technology demonstration	In orbit	Operational
16 August; 18:56	⚀ (Australia) Kanyini	SASIC	Low Earth (SSO)	IoT / Earth observation	In orbit	Operational
16 August; 18:56	⚀ (Chile) Lemu Nge (Forest Eye)	Lemu	Low Earth (SSO)	Earth observation	In orbit	Operational
16 August; 18:56	⚀ (United States) Lemur-2 × 6	Spire Global	Low Earth (SSO)	Earth observation	In orbit	Operational
16 August; 18:56	⚀ (United States) Lopen	Array Labs	Low Earth (SSO)	Technology demonstration	In orbit	Operational
16 August; 18:56	⚀ (Taiwan) Nightjar	TASA / Rapidtek Technologies	Low Earth (SSO)	Technology demonstration	In orbit	Operational
16 August; 18:56	⚀ (United States) OreSat0.5	Portland State University	Low Earth (SSO)	Technology demonstration	In orbit	Operational
16 August; 18:56	⚀ Phi-Sat-2	ESA	Low Earth (SSO)	Technology demonstration	In orbit	Operational
16 August; 18:56	⚀ (Italy) PiCo-IoT × 9	Apogeo Space	Low Earth (SSO)	IoT	In orbit	Operational
16 August; 18:56	⚀ (United States) PTD-R	NASA Ames	Low Earth (SSO)	Technology demonstration	In orbit	Operational
16 August; 18:56	⚀ (United States) PTD-4 (LISA-T)	NASA Ames / MSFC	Low Earth (SSO)	Technology demonstration	In orbit	Operational
16 August; 18:56	⚀ (Germany) QUBE-1	ZFT	Low Earth (SSO)	Quantum key distribution	In orbit	Operational
16 August; 18:56	⚀ (United States) Rock	Array Labs	Low Earth (SSO)	Technology demonstration	In orbit	Operational
16 August; 18:56	⚀ (Sweden) Sedna 1	AAC Clyde Space	Low Earth (SSO)	AIS ship tracking	In orbit	Operational
16 August; 18:56	⚀ (Spain) Sateliot_1 to 4	Sateliot	Low Earth (SSO)	IoT	In orbit	Operational
16 August; 18:56	⚀ (Taiwan) SATORO-T2	SATORO Space	Low Earth (SSO)	Technology demonstration	In orbit	Operational
16 August; 18:56	⚀ (United States) Tomorrow-S1, S2	Tomorrow.io	Low Earth (SSO)	Meteorology	In orbit	Operational
16 August; 18:56	⚀ (Taiwan) TORO	TASA / Pyras Technology	Low Earth (SSO)	Remote sensing	In orbit	Operational
16 August; 18:56	⚀ (United States) TROOP-F2	NearSpace Launch	Low Earth (SSO)	Technology demonstration / Docking target	In orbit	Operational
16 August; 18:56	⚀ (Morocco) UM5-EOSat	Mohammed V University	Low Earth (SSO)	Earth observation	In orbit	Operational
16 August; 18:56	⚀ (Morocco) UM5-Ribat	Mohammed V University	Low Earth (SSO)	Software-defined radio	In orbit	Operational
16 August; 18:56	⚀ (Australia) Waratah Seed WS-1	University of Sydney	Low Earth (SSO)	Technology demonstration	In orbit	Operational
16 August; 18:56	⚀ (Hungary) WREN-1	CS3	Low Earth (SSO)	Technology demonstration	In orbit	Operational
16 August; 18:56	Dedicated SmallSat Rideshare mission to sun-synchronous orbit, designated Transporter-11. GaindéSat‑1A is the first Senegalese satellite. The TROOP-F2 cubesat hosts Celestis' Harmony space burial payload.					
20 August; 13:20	(United States) Falcon 9 Block 5	Starlink Group 10-5	(United States) Cape Canaveral SLC-40		(United States) SpaceX	
20 August; 13:20	(United States) Starlink × 22	SpaceX	Low Earth	Communications	In orbit	Operational
22 August; 12:25	(China) Long March 7A	7A-Y9	(China) Wenchang LC-2		(China) CASC	
22 August; 12:25	(China) ChinaSat 4A (Shen Tong 3A)	China Satcom	GTO to Geosynchronous	Communications	In orbit	Operational
28 August; 06:48	(United States) Falcon 9 Block 5	Starlink Group 8-6	(United States) Cape Canaveral SLC-40		(United States) SpaceX	
28 August; 06:48	(United States) Starlink × 8	SpaceX	Low Earth	Communications	In orbit	Operational
28 August; 06:48	(United States) Starlink-D2C × 13	SpaceX	Low Earth	Communications	In orbit	Operational
28 August; 06:48	The Falcon 9 first stage B1062 became the first booster to fly its 23rd flight, but it toppled over and was destroyed after landing on A Shortfall of Gravitas, breaking a streak of 267 successful landings for SpaceX.					
29 August; 05:22	(China) Ceres-1S	Y3	(China) Dong Fang Hang Tian Gang platform, Yellow Sea		(China) Galactic Energy	
29 August; 05:22	(China) Jitianxing A-03 (Suzhou 1)	Jitian Xingzhou Space Technology	Low Earth (SSO)	Earth observation	In orbit	Operational
29 August; 05:22	(China) Suxing 1-01	Shanghai AIS Aerospace Technology / NWPU	Low Earth (SSO)	Earth observation	In orbit	Operational
29 August; 05:22	(China) Tianfu Gaofen 2 (Tianwei Technology 3, Huaxiangyuan 1)	Tianwei Technology	Low Earth (SSO)	Earth observation	In orbit	Operational
29 August; 05:22	(China) Yunyao-1 15-17	CGSTL	Low Earth (SSO)	Meteorology	In orbit	Operational
29 August; 05:22	Mission designated "How Far I'll Go".					
31 August; 07:43	(United States) Falcon 9 Block 5	Starlink Group 8-10	(United States) Cape Canaveral SLC-40		(United States) SpaceX	
31 August; 07:43	(United States) Starlink × 8	SpaceX	Low Earth	Communications	In orbit	Operational
31 August; 07:43	(United States) Starlink-D2C × 13	SpaceX	Low Earth	Communications	In orbit	Operational
31 August; 08:48	(United States) Falcon 9 Block 5	Starlink Group 9-5	(United States) Vandenberg SLC-4E		(United States) SpaceX	
31 August; 08:48	(United States) Starlink × 8	SpaceX	Low Earth	Communications	In orbit	Operational
31 August; 08:48	(United States) Starlink-D2C × 13	SpaceX	Low Earth	Communications	In orbit	Operational

- ← Jan
- Feb
- Mar
- Apr
- May
- Jun
- Jul
- Aug
- Sep
- Oct
- Nov
- Dec →

=== September ===
Date and time (UTC)	Rocket	Flight number	Launch site		LSP	
Date and time (UTC)	Payload (⚀ = CubeSat)	Operator	Orbit	Function	Decay (UTC)	Outcome
Date and time (UTC)	Remarks					
3 September; 01:22	(China) Long March 4B	4B-Y73	(China) Xichang LC-3		(China) CASC	
3 September; 01:22	(China) Yaogan 43-02A	CAS	Low Earth	Reconnaissance	In orbit	Operational
3 September; 01:22	(China) Yaogan 43-02B	CAS	Low Earth	Reconnaissance	In orbit	Operational
3 September; 01:22	(China) Yaogan 43-02C	CAS	Low Earth	Reconnaissance	In orbit	Operational
3 September; 01:22	(China) Yaogan 43-02D	CAS	Low Earth	Reconnaissance	In orbit	Operational
3 September; 01:22	(China) Yaogan 43-02E	CAS	Low Earth	Reconnaissance	In orbit	Operational
3 September; 01:22	(China) Yaogan 43-02F	CAS	Low Earth	Reconnaissance	In orbit	Operational
5 September; 01:50	(Italy) Vega	VV24	(France) Kourou ELV		(France) Arianespace	
5 September; 01:50	Sentinel-2C	ESA	Low Earth (SSO)	Earth observation	In orbit	Operational
5 September; 01:50	Final flight of the base Vega configuration, with future Vega launches set to use the upgraded Vega-C rocket. Third Sentinel-2 Earth observation satellite.					
5 September; 15:33	(United States) Falcon 9 Block 5	Starlink Group 8-11	(United States) Cape Canaveral SLC-40		(United States) SpaceX	
5 September; 15:33	(United States) Starlink × 8	SpaceX	Low Earth	Communications	In orbit	Operational
5 September; 15:33	(United States) Starlink-D2C × 13	SpaceX	Low Earth	Communications	In orbit	Operational
5 September; 18:30	(China) Long March 6	Y11	(China) Taiyuan LA-16		(China) CASC	
5 September; 18:30	(China) GeeSAT-3 × 10 (21–30)	Geespace	Low Earth	Navigation; Communications	In orbit	Operational
5 September; 18:30	Ten GeeSAT-3 satellites for the Geely Future Mobility Constellation.					
6 September; 01:14	(United States) Falcon 9 Block 5	F9-371	(United States) Vandenberg SLC-4E		(United States) SpaceX	
6 September; 01:14	(United States) USA-400 - USA-420 (Starshield Group 1-3)	NRO	Low Earth (SSO)	Reconnaissance	In orbit	Operational
6 September; 01:14	NROL-113 Mission (NRO Proliferated Architecture Mission). Third batch consisting of 21 SpaceX/Northrop built Starshield satellites for the National Reconnaissance Office.					
10 September; 09:23:49	(United States) Falcon 9 Block 5	F9-372	(United States) Kennedy LC-39A		(United States) SpaceX	
10 September; 09:23:49	(United States) Polaris Dawn	SpaceX	Low Earth (Elliptic)	Human spaceflight research	15 September; 07:37:10	Successful
10 September; 09:23:49	Crew Dragon orbital flight carrying four civilian passengers for 5 days, led by Jared Isaacman. Aims to conduct the first commercial spacewalk. First mission of the Polaris Program, consisting of two Crew Dragon missions followed by the first crewed Starship mission. The highest Earth orbit to be achieved by a crewed spacecraft, and the farthest humans will venture from Earth since Apollo. First EVA by a private astronaut. Crew Dragon Resilience has been modified extensively for these purposes.					
11 September; 16:23:12	(Russia) Soyuz-2.1a		(Kazakhstan) Baikonur Site 31/6		(Russia) Roscosmos	
11 September; 16:23:12	(Russia) Soyuz MS-26 / 72S	Roscosmos	Low Earth (ISS)	Expedition 71/72	20 April 2025; 01:20:35	Successful
12 September; 08:52	(United States) Falcon 9 Block 5	F9-373	(United States) Cape Canaveral SLC-40		(United States) SpaceX	
12 September; 08:52	(United States) BlueBird × 5	AST SpaceMobile	Low Earth	Communications	In orbit	Operational
12 September; 08:52	BlueBird Block 1 Mission.					
13 September; 01:45	(United States) Falcon 9 Block 5	Starlink Group 9-6	(United States) Vandenberg SLC-4E		(United States) SpaceX	
13 September; 01:45	(United States) Starlink × 8	SpaceX	Low Earth	Communications	In orbit	Operational
13 September; 01:45	(United States) Starlink-D2C × 13	SpaceX	Low Earth	Communications	In orbit	Operational
14 September; 05:58	(Iran) Qaem 100		(Iran) Shahroud Space Center		(Iran) IRGC	
14 September; 05:58	(Iran) Chamran 1	ISA / SaeIran	Low Earth	Technology demonstration	In orbit	Operational
17 September; 07:01:00	(Russia) Angara 1.2		(Russia) Plesetsk Site 35/1		(Russia) RVSN RF	
17 September; 07:01:00	(Russia) OO MKA №1 (Kosmos 2577)	VKS	Low Earth (SSO)	Reconnaissance	In orbit	Operational
17 September; 07:01:00	(Russia) OO MKA №2 (Kosmos 2578)	VKS	Low Earth (SSO)	Reconnaissance	In orbit	Operational
17 September; 22:50:49	(United States) Falcon 9 Block 5	F9-375	(United States) Cape Canaveral SLC-40		(United States) SpaceX	
17 September; 22:50:49	Galileo FOC FM26	ESA	Medium Earth	Navigation	In orbit	Operational
17 September; 22:50:49	Galileo FOC FM32	ESA	Medium Earth	Navigation	In orbit	Operational
17 September; 22:50:49	Second and last Galileo launch on a Falcon 9 and overall thirteenth launch of Galileo satellites, carrying two satellites. Originally planned to launch on Soyuz ST-B, but scrapped due to geopolitical factors. Then moved to Ariane 6, which was also scrapped due to delays. Europe contracted SpaceX to launch the two pairs aboard Falcon 9.					
19 September; 01:14	(China) Long March 3B/E / YZ-1	3B-Y80	(China) Xichang LC-2		(China) CASC	
19 September; 01:14	(China) BeiDou-3 M25 (BeiDou 59)	CNSA	Medium Earth	Navigation	In orbit	Operational
19 September; 01:14	(China) BeiDou-3 M27 (BeiDou 60)	CNSA	Medium Earth	Navigation	In orbit	Operational
19 September; 01:14	Both Satellites are Technology Demonstrator for Beidou-4.					
20 September; 04:10	(China) Long March 2D	2D-Y99	(China) Taiyuan LA-9		(China) CASC	
20 September; 04:10	(China) Jilin-1 Kuanfu-02B (01-06)	Chang Guang Satellite Technology	Low Earth (SSO)	Earth observation	In orbit	Operational
20 September; 04:10	Jilin-1 Kuanfu-02B 01 is also known as Qilian-1.					
20 September; 09:43	(China) Kuaizhou 1A	Y31	(China) Xichang		(China) ExPace	
20 September; 09:43	(China) Tianqi 29–32	Guodian Gaoke	Low Earth (SSO)	IoT	In orbit	Operational
20 September; 13:50	(United States) Falcon 9 Block 5	Starlink Group 9-17	(United States) Vandenberg SLC-4E		(United States) SpaceX	
20 September; 13:50	(United States) Starlink × 7	SpaceX	Low Earth	Communications	In orbit	Operational
20 September; 13:50	(United States) Starlink-D2C × 13	SpaceX	Low Earth	Communications	In orbit	Operational
20 September; 23:01	(United States) Electron	"Kinéis Killed The RadIoT Star"	(New Zealand) Mahia LC-1A		(United States) Rocket Lab	
20 September; 23:01	⚀ (France) Kinéis × 5	Kinéis	Low Earth	IoT	In orbit	Operational
20 September; 23:01	Second of five dedicated launches for Kinéis' IoT satellite constellation.					
24 September; 02:31:41	(China) Jielong 3	Y4	Dongfang Hang Tian Gang platform, South China Sea		China Rocket	
24 September; 02:31:41	(China) Fudan-1 (Lanmei Weilai)	SAST / Fudan University	Low Earth (SSO)	Earth observation	In orbit	Operational
24 September; 02:31:41	(China) Jitianxing A-01 (Jilin Daxue 1)	Jitian Xingzhou Space Technology	Low Earth (SSO)	Earth observation	In orbit	Operational
24 September; 02:31:41	(China) Luojia 4-01 (Wuhan Dauxe Renmin Yiyuan Jiankang, Yuxing-2 05)	Wuhan University	Low Earth (SSO)	Earth observation	In orbit	Operational
24 September; 02:31:41	(China) Tianyan-15 (Zhuizhong Qianyan 1)	Final Frontier Aerospace	Low Earth (SSO)	Earth observation	In orbit	Operational
24 September; 02:31:41	(China) Tianyi-41 (Shenqi, Ganzhou 1)	SpaceTy / Zhangye Xinguo	Low Earth (SSO)	Earth observation	In orbit	Operational
24 September; 02:31:41	(China) Xingshidai-15 (Xianggang Qingnian Kechuang)	ADASpace	Low Earth (SSO)	Earth observation	In orbit	Operational
24 September; 02:31:41	(China) Xingshidai-21 (Kexing Liangxi Shuangzi 1)	ADASpace	Low Earth (SSO)	Earth observation	In orbit	Operational
24 September; 02:31:41	(China) Xingshidai-22 (Kexing Liangxi Shuangzi 2)	ADASpace	Low Earth (SSO)	Earth observation	In orbit	Operational
24 September; 23:33:01	(China) Kinetica 1	Y4	(China) Jiuquan LS-130		(China) CAS Space	
24 September; 23:33:01	(China) AIRSAT 01 (Zhongke 01)	CAS	Low Earth (SSO)	Earth observation	In orbit	Operational
24 September; 23:33:01	(China) AIRSAT 02 (Zhongke 02)	CAS	Low Earth (SSO)	Earth observation	In orbit	Operational
24 September; 23:33:01	(China) Jilin-1 SAR-01A	Chang Guang Satellite Technology	Low Earth (SSO)	Earth observation	In orbit	Operational
24 September; 23:33:01	(China) Yunyao-1 (21-22)	CGSTL	Low Earth (SSO)	Meteorology	In orbit	Operational
25 September; 04:01:20	(United States) Falcon 9 Block 5	Starlink Group 9-8	(United States) Vandenberg SLC-4E		(United States) SpaceX	
25 September; 04:01:20	(United States) Starlink × 7	SpaceX	Low Earth	Communications	In orbit	Operational
25 September; 04:01:20	(United States) Starlink-D2C × 13	SpaceX	Low Earth	Communications	In orbit	Operational
26 September; 05:24:20	(Japan) H-IIA 202	F49	(Japan) Tanegashima LA-Y1		(Japan) MHI	
26 September; 05:24:20	(Japan) IGS-Radar 8	CSICE	Low Earth (SSO)	Reconnaissance	In orbit	Operational
27 September; 10:30	(China) Long March 2D	2D-Y42	(China) Jiuquan SLS-2		(China) CASC	
27 September; 10:30	(China) Shijian 19	CAST	Low Earth	Reentry capsule Technology demonstration	11 October; 02:39	Successful
28 September; 17:17:21	(United States) Falcon 9 Block 5	F9-378	(United States) Cape Canaveral SLC-40		(United States) SpaceX	
28 September; 17:17:21	(United States) SpaceX Crew-9	SpaceX / NASA	Low Earth (ISS)	Expedition 72 / 73	18 March 2025; 21:57:07	Successful
28 September; 17:17:21	Ninth operational Crew Dragon mission to the ISS. First crewed launch from SLC-40. After NASA decided to return Starliner's Crewed Flight Test (CFT) vehicle uncrewed, it was decided that Crew-9 would launch with only 2 crew members of the originally intended 4, and land with the added 2 Starliner CFT crew. After Dragon separation, the second stage performed an off-nominal deorbit burn that, while it put the second stage on a reentry course over the ocean, made it fall outside of the predetermined safety area for reentry.					

- ← Jan
- Feb
- Mar
- Apr
- May
- Jun
- Jul
- Aug
- Sep
- Oct
- Nov
- Dec →

=== October ===
Date and time (UTC)	Rocket	Flight number	Launch site		LSP	
Date and time (UTC)	Payload (⚀ = CubeSat)	Operator	Orbit	Function	Decay (UTC)	Outcome
Date and time (UTC)	Remarks					
4 October; 11:25	(United States) Vulcan Centaur VC2S	Cert-2; V-002	(United States) Cape Canaveral SLC-41		(United States) ULA	
4 October; 11:25	(United States) Mass simulator	ULA	Heliocentric	Mass simulator	In orbit	Successful
4 October; 11:25	Certification-2 mission, the second of two launches needed to certify the rocket for NSSL missions. Originally scheduled to carry the first flight of Dream Chaser; however, due to schedule delays with Dream Chaser, ULA flew a mass simulator with experiments and demonstrations of future Centaur V technologies. Approximately 37 seconds into the launch, the nozzle on one of solid rocket boosters (SRB) fell off resulting in a shower of debris in the exhaust plume. Although the SRB continued to function for its full 90-second burn, the anomaly led to reduced, asymmetrical thrust. This caused the rocket to slightly tilt before the guidance system and main engines successfully corrected and extended their burn by roughly 20 seconds to compensate. Despite the anomaly, the rocket achieved a perfect orbital insertion.					
7 October; 14:52:11	(United States) Falcon 9 Block 5	F9-379	(United States) Cape Canaveral SLC-40		(United States) SpaceX	
7 October; 14:52:11	Hera	ESA	Heliocentric	Asteroid orbiter	In orbit	En route
7 October; 14:52:11	⚀ Juventas	ESA	Heliocentric	Asteroid probe	In orbit	Awaiting deployment
7 October; 14:52:11	⚀ Milani	ESA	Heliocentric	Asteroid probe	In orbit	Awaiting deployment
7 October; 14:52:11	Falcon 9 First Stage Booster (B1061) is expended in this mission.					
10 October; 13:50	(China) Long March 3B/E	3B-Y100	(China) Xichang LC-2		(China) CASC	
10 October; 13:50	(China) Weixing Hulianwang Gaogui-03	APT Satellite Holdings / CAST	GTO to Geosynchronous	Communications	In orbit	Operational
10 October; 13:50	It is part of the Guowang (Xingwang) constellation.					
14 October; 16:06:00	(United States) Falcon Heavy	FH-011	(United States) Kennedy LC-39A		(United States) SpaceX	
14 October; 16:06:00	(United States) Europa Clipper	NASA	Heliocentric to Jovicentric	Jupiter orbiter	In orbit	En route
14 October; 16:06:00	The launch Vehicle was switched from SLS to Falcon Heavy in July 2021.					
15 October; 06:10	(United States) Falcon 9 Block 5	Starlink Group 10-10	(United States) Cape Canaveral SLC-40		(United States) SpaceX	
15 October; 06:10	(United States) Starlink × 23	SpaceX	Low Earth	Communications	In orbit	Operational
15 October; 08:21	(United States) Falcon 9 Block 5	Starlink Group 9-7	(United States) Vandenberg SLC-4E		(United States) SpaceX	
15 October; 08:21	(United States) Starlink × 7	SpaceX	Low Earth	Communications	In orbit	Operational
15 October; 08:21	(United States) Starlink-D2C × 13	SpaceX	Low Earth	Communications	In orbit	Operational
15 October; 11:06	(China) Long March 6A	6A-Y20 / G60 Polar Group 02	(China) Taiyuan LA-9A		(China) CASC	
15 October; 11:06	(China) Qianfan × 18	SSST	Low Earth (Polar)	Communications	In orbit	Operational
15 October; 11:06	Second batch of satellites for the 14,000-satellite Thousand Sails megaconstellation.					
15 October; 23:45	(China) Long March 4C	4C-Y59	(China) Jiuquan SLS-2		(China) CASC	
15 October; 23:45	(China) Gaofen 12-05	CNSA	Low Earth (SSO)	Earth observation	In orbit	Operational
18 October; 23:31	(United States) Falcon 9 Block 5	Starlink Group 8-19	(United States) Cape Canaveral SLC-40		(United States) SpaceX	
18 October; 23:31	(United States) Starlink × 7	SpaceX	Low Earth	Communications	In orbit	Operational
18 October; 23:31	(United States) Starlink-D2C × 13	SpaceX	Low Earth	Communications	In orbit	Operational
20 October; 05:13	(United States) Falcon 9 Block 5	F9-383	(United States) Vandenberg SLC-4E		(United States) SpaceX	
20 October; 05:13	(United Kingdom) OneWeb × 20	Eutelsat OneWeb	Low Earth	Communications	In orbit	Operational
20 October; 05:13	OneWeb #20. First OneWeb launch since the Eutelsat – OneWeb merger in 28 September 2023.					
22 October; 00:10	(China) Long March 6	Y13	(China) Taiyuan LA-16		(China) CASC	
22 October; 00:10	(China) Tianping 3A-01	CAS	Low Earth (SSO)	Radar calibration	In orbit	Operational
22 October; 00:10	(China) Tianping 3B-01	CASIC	Low Earth (SSO)	Radar calibration	In orbit	Operational
22 October; 00:10	(China) Tianping 3B-02	CASIC	Low Earth (SSO)	Radar calibration	In orbit	Operational
23 October; 01:09	(China) Long March 2C	2C-Y82	(China) Xichang LC-3		(China) CASC	
23 October; 01:09	(China) Yaogan 43-03A	CAS	Low Earth	Reconnaissance	In orbit	Operational
23 October; 01:09	(China) Yaogan 43-03B	CAS	Low Earth	Reconnaissance	In orbit	Operational
23 October; 01:09	(China) Yaogan 43-03C	CAS	Low Earth	Reconnaissance	In orbit	Operational
23 October; 21:47	(United States) Falcon 9 Block 5	Starlink Group 6-61	(United States) Cape Canaveral SLC-40		(United States) SpaceX	
23 October; 21:47	(United States) Starlink × 23	SpaceX	Low Earth	Communications	In orbit	Operational
24 October; 17:14	(United States) Falcon 9 Block 5	F9-385	(United States) Vandenberg SLC-4E		(United States) SpaceX	
24 October; 17:14	(United States) USA-421 - USA-437 (Starshield Group 1-4)	NRO	Low Earth (SSO)	Reconnaissance	In orbit	Operational
24 October; 17:14	NROL-167 Mission (NRO's Proliferated Architecture Mission). Fourth batch consisting of 17 SpaceX/Northrop built Starshield satellites for the National Reconnaissance Office. 100th Falcon 9 launch in 2024.					
26 October; 21:47	(United States) Falcon 9 Block 5	Starlink Group 10-8	(United States) Cape Canaveral SLC-40		(United States) SpaceX	
26 October; 21:47	(United States) Starlink × 22	SpaceX	Low Earth	Communications	In orbit	Operational
29 October; 20:27:34	(China) Long March 2F/G	2F-Y19	(China) Jiuquan SLS-1		(China) CASC	
29 October; 20:27:34	(China) Shenzhou 19	CMSA	Low Earth (TSS)	Crewed spaceflight	In orbit	Docked to TSS
29 October; 20:27:34	Eighth crewed mission to Tiangong Space Station (TSS).					
30 October; 12:07	(United States) Falcon 9 Block 5	Starlink Group 9-9	(United States) Vandenberg SLC-4E		(United States) SpaceX	
30 October; 12:07	(United States) Starlink × 20	SpaceX	Low Earth	Communications	In orbit	Operational
30 October; 12:07	200th Starlink Launch.					
30 October; 21:10	(United States) Falcon 9 Block 5	Starlink Group 10-13	(United States) Cape Canaveral SLC-40		(United States) SpaceX	
30 October; 21:10	(United States) Starlink × 7	SpaceX	Low Earth	Communications	In orbit	Operational
30 October; 21:10	(United States) Starlink-D2C × 13	SpaceX	Low Earth	Communications	In orbit	Operational
31 October; 07:51:31	(Russia) Soyuz-2.1a		(Russia) Plesetsk Site 43/4		(Russia) RVSN RF	
31 October; 07:51:31	(Russia) Kosmos 2579 (Bars-M 6L)	VKS	Low Earth	Reconnaissance	In orbit	Operational

- ← Jan
- Feb
- Mar
- Apr
- May
- Jun
- Jul
- Aug
- Sep
- Oct
- Nov
- Dec →

=== November ===
Date and time (UTC)	Rocket	Flight number	Launch site		LSP	
Date and time (UTC)	Payload (⚀ = CubeSat)	Operator	Orbit	Function	Decay (UTC)	Outcome
Date and time (UTC)	Remarks					
4 November; 06:48:00	(Japan) H3-22S	F4	(Japan) Tanegashima LA-Y2		(Japan) MHI	
4 November; 06:48:00	(Japan) DSN-3 (Kirameki 3)	DSN / JSDF	GTO to Geosynchronous	Communications	In orbit	Operational
4 November; 23:18:40	(Russia) Soyuz-2.1b / Fregat-M		(Russia) Vostochny Site 1S		(Russia) Roscosmos	
4 November; 23:18:40	(Russia) Ionosfera-M №1	IKI RAN	Low Earth (SSO)	Ionospheric; Magnetospheric research	In orbit	Operational
4 November; 23:18:40	(Russia) Ionosfera-M №2	IKI RAN	Low Earth (SSO)	Ionospheric; Magnetospheric research	In orbit	Operational
4 November; 23:18:40	⚀ (Russia) Altair	MSU	Low Earth (SSO)	Astronomical observation	In orbit	Operational
4 November; 23:18:40	⚀ (Russia) ArcticSat-1	NArFU	Low Earth (SSO)	Earth observation	In orbit	Operational
4 November; 23:18:40	⚀ (Russia) (China) ASRTU-1 (Frendship ATURK)	HIT	Low Earth (SSO)	Amateur radio	In orbit	Operational
4 November; 23:18:40	⚀ (Russia) CSTP-2.1, CSTP-2.11, CSTP-2.2	Special Technology Center	Low Earth (SSO)	Technology demonstration	In orbit	Operational
4 November; 23:18:40	⚀ (Russia) Gorizont	BGTU	Low Earth (SSO)	Technology demonstration Earth observation	In orbit	Operational
4 November; 23:18:40	⚀ (Iran) Hod-Hod 1A	SpaceOMID	Low Earth (SSO)	IoT	In orbit	Operational
4 November; 23:18:40	⚀ (Russia) HyperView-1G	Samara University	Low Earth (SSO)	Earth observation	In orbit	Operational
4 November; 23:18:40	⚀ (Russia) Khors 3, 4	IKI RAN	Low Earth (SSO)	Technology demonstration	In orbit	Operational
4 November; 23:18:40	⚀ (Russia) Kolibri-S	Samara University	Low Earth (SSO)	Remote sensing	In orbit	Operational
4 November; 23:18:40	⚀ (Iran) Kowsar	SpaceOMID	Low Earth (SSO)	Earth observation	In orbit	Operational
4 November; 23:18:40	⚀ (Russia) Mordovia-IoT	Mordovian State University	Low Earth (SSO)	IoT	In orbit	Operational
4 November; 23:18:40	⚀ (Russia) MTUCI-1	MTUCI	Low Earth (SSO)	Technology demonstration	In orbit	Operational
4 November; 23:18:40	⚀ (Russia) Nokhcho	Chechen State University	Low Earth (SSO)	IoT	In orbit	Operational
4 November; 23:18:40	⚀ (Russia) Norbi-3	NSU	Low Earth (SSO)	Space weather	In orbit	Operational
4 November; 23:18:40	⚀ (Russia) Polytech Universe-4	SPbPU	Low Earth (SSO)	Remote sensing	In orbit	Operational
4 November; 23:18:40	⚀ (Russia) Polytech Universe-5	SPbPU	Low Earth (SSO)	AIS IoT	In orbit	Operational
4 November; 23:18:40	⚀ (Russia) RTU MIREA 1	RTU MIREA	Low Earth (SSO)	Technology demonstration	In orbit	Operational
4 November; 23:18:40	⚀ (Russia) Ruzaevka-390	Mordovian State University	Low Earth (SSO)	Technology demonstration	In orbit	Operational
4 November; 23:18:40	⚀ (Russia) SamSat-ION 2 (SamSat-Ionosphere)	Samara University	Low Earth (SSO)	Ionosphere study	In orbit	Operational
4 November; 23:18:40	⚀ (Russia) SIT-2086	Sitronics Group	Low Earth (SSO)	Remote sensing IoT	In orbit	Operational
4 November; 23:18:40	⚀ (Russia) SIT-HSE	SPbSUT	Low Earth (SSO)	Remote sensing IoT	In orbit	Operational
4 November; 23:18:40	⚀ (Russia) SITRO-AIS × 24	Sitronics Group	Low Earth (SSO)	AIS ship tracking	In orbit	Operational
4 November; 23:18:40	⚀ (Russia) TUSUR-GO	TUSUR	Low Earth (SSO)	Technology demonstration	In orbit	Operational
4 November; 23:18:40	⚀ (Russia) Vizard-ion	MSU-STANDART	Low Earth (SSO)	Technology demonstration	In orbit	Operational
4 November; 23:18:40	⚀ (Russia) Vladivostok-1	TBA	Low Earth (SSO)	TBA	In orbit	Operational
4 November; 23:18:40	⚀ (Russia) YUZGU-60	SWSU	Low Earth (SSO)	Technology demonstration	In orbit	Operational
4 November; 23:18:40	⚀ (Zimbabwe) ZimSat-2 (AMAISAT)	TBA	Low Earth (SSO)	Earth observation	In orbit	Operational
4 November; 23:18:40	GK Launch Services commercial rideshare mission.					
5 November; 02:29:30	(United States) Falcon 9 Block 5	F9-389	(United States) Kennedy LC-39A		(United States) SpaceX	
5 November; 02:29:30	(United States) SpaceX CRS-31	NASA	Low Earth (ISS)	ISS logistics	17 December; 18:39:30	Successful
5 November; 02:29:30	⚀ (Japan) DENDEN-01	KU / UF / MU / ArkEdge Space	Low Earth	Technology demonstration	In orbit	Operational
5 November; 02:29:30	⚀ (Japan) LignoSat	KyotoU	Low Earth (ISS)	Technology demonstration	In orbit	Operational
5 November; 02:29:30	⚀ (Taiwan) (Japan) ONGLAISAT	TASA / UT	Low Earth	Earth observation	In orbit	Operational
5 November; 02:29:30	⚀ (Japan) YODAKA	UP Hanamaki	Low Earth	Educational / Earth observation	In orbit	Operational
5 November; 02:29:30	⚀ (Japan) YOMOGI	Chiba Institute of Technology	Low Earth	Educational / Amateur radio / Earth observation	In orbit	Operational
5 November; 02:29:30	LignoSat is credited as the world's first wooden satellite. All CubeSats were deployed into orbit from the ISS on 9 December 2024. First Dragon to perform a reboost of the ISS.					
5 November; 10:54	(United States) Electron	"Changes In Latitudes, Changes In Attitudes"	(New Zealand) Mahia LC-1B		(United States) Rocket Lab	
5 November; 10:54	(United States) (Rwanda) Protosat-1	E-Space	Low Earth (SSO)	Communications	In orbit	Operational
5 November; 10:54	First of Four dedicated Electron launches for a confidential Customer.					
7 November; 20:19	(United States) Falcon 9 Block 5	Starlink Group 6-77	(United States) Cape Canaveral SLC-40		(United States) SpaceX	
7 November; 20:19	(United States) Starlink × 23	SpaceX	Low Earth	Communications	In orbit	Operational
9 November; 03:39	(China) Long March 2C	2C-Y55	(China) Jiuquan SLS-2		(China) CASC	
9 November; 03:39	(China) PIESAT-2A 01	PIESAT	Low Earth (SSO)	Earth observation	In orbit	Operational
9 November; 03:39	(China) PIESAT-2B 01–03	PIESAT	Low Earth (SSO)	Earth observation	In orbit	Operational
9 November; 06:14	(United States) Falcon 9 Block 5	Starlink Group 9-10	(United States) Vandenberg SLC-4E		(United States) SpaceX	
9 November; 06:14	(United States) Starlink × 7	SpaceX	Low Earth	Communications	In orbit	Operational
9 November; 06:14	(United States) Starlink-D2C × 13	SpaceX	Low Earth	Communications	In orbit	Operational
11 November; 04:03	(China) Kinetica 1	Y5	(China) Jiuquan LS-130		(China) CAS Space	
11 November; 04:03	(China) Jilin-1 Gaofen-05B	Chang Guang Satellite Technology	Low Earth (SSO)	Earth observation	In orbit	Operational
11 November; 04:03	(China) Jilin-1 Pingtai-02A-03 (Yiyatong)	Chang Guang Satellite Technology	Low Earth (SSO)	Earth observation	In orbit	Operational
11 November; 04:03	Omani IRSS-1 (Oman Zhineng Yaogan 1)	CAST / Star Vision	Low Earth (SSO)	Earth observation	In orbit	Operational
11 November; 04:03	(China) Shiyan 26A	TBA	Low Earth (SSO)	Technology demonstration	In orbit	Operational
11 November; 04:03	(China) Shiyan 26B	TBA	Low Earth (SSO)	Technology demonstration	In orbit	Operational
11 November; 04:03	(China) Shiyan 26C	TBA	Low Earth (SSO)	Technology demonstration	In orbit	Operational
11 November; 04:03	(China) Tianyan-24 (Liangping)	TBA	Low Earth (SSO)	Earth observation	In orbit	Operational
11 November; 04:03	(China) Xiguang-1 04 (Quehua-1)	XiopmSPACE	Low Earth (SSO)	Earth observation	In orbit	Operational
11 November; 04:03	(China) Xiguang-1 05 (Tianxianpei)	XiopmSPACE	Low Earth (SSO)	Earth observation	In orbit	Operational
11 November; 04:03	(China) Yunyao-1 31-36	CGSTL	Low Earth (SSO)	Meteorology	In orbit	Operational
11 November; 04:03	First flight of Kinetica 1 with a 3.35m fairing.					
11 November; 17:22	(United States) Falcon 9 Block 5	F9-392	(United States) Kennedy LC-39A		(United States) SpaceX	
11 November; 17:22	(South Korea) Koreasat 6A (Mugunghwa 6A)	KT SAT	GTO to Geosynchronous	Communications	In orbit	Operational
11 November; 17:22	Replacement for Koreasat 6.					
11 November; 21:28	(United States) Falcon 9 Block 5	Starlink Group 6-69	(United States) Cape Canaveral SLC-40		(United States) SpaceX	
11 November; 21:28	(United States) Starlink × 24	SpaceX	Low Earth	Communications	In orbit	Operational
13 November; 22:42	(China) Long March 4B	4B-Y53	(China) Taiyuan LC-9		(China) CASC	
13 November; 22:42	(China) Haiyang-4A (Haiyang Yandu Tance)	Ministry of Natural Resources	Low Earth (SSO)	Oceanography	In orbit	Operational
13 November; 22:42	The first stage is equipped with grid fins to mitigate the impacts on possible landing area.					
14 November; 05:23	(United States) Falcon 9 Block 5	Starlink Group 9-11	(United States) Vandenberg SLC-4E		(United States) SpaceX	
14 November; 05:23	(United States) Starlink × 7	SpaceX	Low Earth	Communications	In orbit	Operational
14 November; 05:23	(United States) Starlink-D2C × 13	SpaceX	Low Earth	Communications	In orbit	Operational
14 November; 13:21	(United States) Falcon 9 Block 5	Starlink Group 6-68	(United States) Cape Canaveral SLC-40		(United States) SpaceX	
14 November; 13:21	(United States) Starlink × 24	SpaceX	Low Earth	Communications	In orbit	Operational
15 November; 15:13:18	(China) Long March 7	Y9	(China) Wenchang LC-2		(China) CASC	
15 November; 15:13:18	(China) Tianzhou 8	CMSA	Low Earth (TSS)	Space logistics	8 July 2025; 22:46	Successful
15 November; 15:13:18	⚀ (China) Naxing-4A	Tsinghua University	Low Earth	Earth observation	In orbit	Operational
15 November; 15:13:18	⚀ (China) Naxing-4B	Tsinghua University	Low Earth	Earth observation	In orbit	Operational
15 November; 15:13:18	Seventh cargo resupply mission to Tiangong space station (TSS)					
17 November; 22:19	(United States) Falcon 9 Block 5	F9-396	(United States) Kennedy LC-39A		(United States) SpaceX	
17 November; 22:19	(Australia) Optus-X (TD7/ADS 01)	Optus	GTO to Geosynchronous	Communications	In orbit	Operational
18 November; 05:53	(United States) Falcon 9 Block 5	Starlink Group 9-12	(United States) Vandenberg SLC-4E		(United States) SpaceX	
18 November; 05:53	(United States) Starlink × 7	SpaceX	Low Earth	Communications	In orbit	Operational
18 November; 05:53	(United States) Starlink-D2C × 13	SpaceX	Low Earth	Communications	In orbit	Operational
18 November; 18:31	(United States) Falcon 9 Block 5	F9-398	(United States) Cape Canaveral SLC-40		(United States) SpaceX	
18 November; 18:31	(India) GSAT-20 (GSAT-N2/CMS-03)	NSIL / Dish TV	GTO to Geosynchronous	Communications	In orbit	Operational
18 November; 18:31	Initially planned to launch on LVM3, but shifted to Falcon 9 due to weight and scheduling issues.					
21 November; 12:22:23	(Russia) Soyuz-2.1a		(Kazakhstan) Baikonur Site 31/6		(Russia) Roscosmos	
21 November; 12:22:23	(Russia) Progress MS-29 / 90P	Roscosmos	Low Earth (ISS)	ISS logistics	1 July 2025; 22:30	Successful
21 November; 16:07	(United States) Falcon 9 Block 5	Starlink Group 6-66	(United States) Cape Canaveral SLC-40		(United States) SpaceX	
21 November; 16:07	(United States) Starlink × 24	SpaceX	Low Earth	Communications	In orbit	Operational
21 November; 16:07	400th Falcon 9 Launch.					
24 November; 05:25	(United States) Falcon 9 Block 5	Starlink Group 9-13	(United States) Vandenberg SLC-4E		(United States) SpaceX	
24 November; 05:25	(United States) Starlink × 7	SpaceX	Low Earth	Communications	In orbit	Operational
24 November; 05:25	(United States) Starlink-D2C × 13	SpaceX	Low Earth	Communications	In orbit	Operational
24 November; 05:25	100th Falcon 9 launch from Vandenberg.					
24 November; 23:39	(China) Long March 2C	2C-Y57	(China) Jiuquan SLS-2		(China) CASC	
24 November; 23:39	(China) Siwei Gaojing 2-03 (SuperView Neo 2-03)	China Siwei	Low Earth (SSO)	Earth observation	In orbit	Operational
24 November; 23:39	(China) Siwei Gaojing 2-04 (SuperView Neo 2-04)	China Siwei	Low Earth (SSO)	Earth observation	In orbit	Operational
25 November; 03:55	(United States) Electron	"Ice AIS Baby"	(New Zealand) Mahia LC-1B		(United States) Rocket Lab	
25 November; 03:55	⚀ (France) Kinéis × 5	Kinéis	Low Earth	IoT	In orbit	Operational
25 November; 03:55	Third of five dedicated launches for Kinéis' IoT satellite constellation.					
25 November; 10:02	(United States) Falcon 9 Block 5	Starlink Group 12-1	(United States) Cape Canaveral SLC-40		(United States) SpaceX	
25 November; 10:02	(United States) Starlink × 11	SpaceX	Low Earth	Communications	In orbit	Operational
25 November; 10:02	(United States) Starlink-D2C × 12	SpaceX	Low Earth	Communications	In orbit	Operational
25 November; 10:02	First launch of Starlink Group 12 Satellites.					
27 November; 02:00:03	(China) Zhuque-2E	Y1	(China) Jiuquan LS-96		(China) LandSpace	
27 November; 02:00:03	(China) Guangchuan-01	Aurora Starcom	Low Earth	Communications	In orbit	Operational
27 November; 02:00:03	(China) Guangchuan-02	Aurora Starcom	Low Earth	Communications	In orbit	Operational
27 November; 02:00:03	Maiden flight of Zhuque-2E, featuring an upgraded second stage.					
27 November; 04:41	(United States) Falcon 9 Block 5	Starlink Group 6-76	(United States) Kennedy LC-39A		(United States) SpaceX	
27 November; 04:41	(United States) Starlink × 24	SpaceX	Low Earth	Communications	In orbit	Operational
29 November; 21:50:25	(Russia) Soyuz-2.1a / Fregat-M		(Russia) Vostochny Site 1S		(Russia) Roscosmos	
29 November; 21:50:25	(Russia) Kondor-FKA №2	Roscosmos	Low Earth	Reconnaissance	In orbit	Operational
30 November; 05:00	(United States) Falcon 9 Block 5	Starlink Group 6-65	(United States) Cape Canaveral SLC-40		(United States) SpaceX	
30 November; 05:00	(United States) Starlink × 24	SpaceX	Low Earth	Communications	In orbit	Operational
30 November; 08:10:00	(United States) Falcon 9 Block 5	F9-404	(United States) Vandenberg SLC-4E		(United States) SpaceX	
30 November; 08:10:00	(United States) USA-438 - USA-439 (Starshield Group 2-2)	NRO	Low Earth (SSO)	Reconnaissance	In orbit	Operational
30 November; 08:10:00	(United States) Starlink × 20 (Starlink Group N-01)	SpaceX	Low Earth (SSO)	Communications	In orbit	Operational
30 November; 08:10:00	NROL-126 Mission (NRO's Proliferated Architecture Mission) coupled with 20 Starlink Group N-01 satellites. Fifth batch consisting of 2 SpaceX/Northrop built Starshield satellites for the National Reconnaissance Office.					
30 November; 14:25	(China) Long March 12	Y1	(China) Wenchang Commercial LC-2		(China) CASC	
30 November; 14:25	(China) Hulianwang Jishu Shiyan 5A	CAS / GalaxySpace	Low Earth	Communications	In orbit	Operational
30 November; 14:25	(China) JSW-03	TBA	Low Earth	Technology demonstration	In orbit	Operational
30 November; 14:25	Maiden flight of Long March 12. First launch from the Wenchang Commercial Space Launch Site. First launch from the Wenchang Commercial Space Launch Site's LC-2. It is part of the Guowang (Xingwang) constellation.					

- ← Jan
- Feb
- Mar
- Apr
- May
- Jun
- Jul
- Aug
- Sep
- Oct
- Nov
- Dec →

=== December ===
Date and time (UTC)	Rocket	Flight number	Launch site		LSP	
Date and time (UTC)	Payload (⚀ = CubeSat)	Operator	Orbit	Function	Decay (UTC)	Outcome
Date and time (UTC)	Remarks					
3 December; 05:56	(China) Long March 3B/E	3B-Y103	(China) Xichang LC-3		(China) CASC	
3 December; 05:56	(China) TJS-13 (Huoyan-1 04)	SAST	Highly elliptical (Molniya)	Early warning	In orbit	Operational
3 December; 05:56	100th Long March 3B launch.					
4 December; 04:46	(China) Kuaizhou 1A Pro	Y30	(China) Xichang		(China) ExPace	
4 December; 04:46	(China) AIRSAT 08 (Zhongke 08/Haishao 1/Sea Sentinel-1)	CAS	VLEO	Earth observation	In orbit	Operational
4 December; 04:46	Maiden flight of an upgraded version of Kuaizhou 1A, Kuaizhou 1A Pro.					
4 December; 10:13:10	(United States) Falcon 9 Block 5	Starlink Group 6-70	(United States) Cape Canaveral SLC-40		(United States) SpaceX	
4 December; 10:13:10	(United States) Starlink × 24	SpaceX	Low Earth	Communications	In orbit	Operational
4 December; 10:13:10	B1067 has become the first booster to launch for its 24th time.					
4 December; 18:03:13	(Russia) Soyuz-2.1b		(Russia) Plesetsk Site 43/4		(Russia) RVSN RF	
4 December; 18:03:13	(Russia) Kosmos 2580 (Lotos-S1 №8)	VKS	Low Earth	ELINT	In orbit	Operational
4 December; 18:03:13	1000th launch of the R-7 family of rockets from Plesetsk Cosmodrome.					
5 December; 03:05:00	(United States) Falcon 9 Block 5	Starlink Group 9-14	(United States) Vandenberg SLC-4E		(United States) SpaceX	
5 December; 03:05:00	(United States) Starlink × 7	SpaceX	Low Earth	Communications	In orbit	Operational
5 December; 03:05:00	(United States) Starlink-D2C × 13	SpaceX	Low Earth	Communications	In orbit	Operational
5 December; 03:05:00	Last Batch of Starlink Direct-to-Cell transponders of the Starlink Direct-to-Cell Satellite constellation to be launched, completing the Starlink Direct-to-Cell Constellation.					
5 December; 04:41	(China) Long March 6A	6A-Y22 / G60 Polar Group 03	(China) Taiyuan LA-9A		(China) CASC	
5 December; 04:41	(China) Qianfan × 18	SSST	Low Earth (Polar)	Communications	In orbit	Operational
5 December; 04:41	Third batch of satellites for the 14,000-satellite Thousand Sails megaconstellation.					
5 December; 10:34	(India) PSLV-XL	C59	(India) Satish Dhawan FLP		(India) NSIL	
5 December; 10:34	PROBA-3 Coronagraph	ESA	Highly elliptical	Solar observatory Coronagraph	In orbit	Operational
5 December; 10:34	PROBA-3 Occulter	ESA	Highly elliptical	Solar observatory Occulter	In orbit	Operational
5 December; 16:10	(United States) Falcon 9 Block 5	F9-407	(United States) Kennedy LC-39A		(United States) SpaceX	
5 December; 16:10	(United States) SXM-9	SiriusXM	GTO to Geosynchronous	Communications	In orbit	Operational
5 December; 16:10	Replacement for the partly-failed SXM 7.					
5 December; 21:20	(Italy) Vega-C	VV25	(France) Kourou ELV		(France) Arianespace	
5 December; 21:20	Sentinel-1C	ESA	Low Earth (SSO)	Earth observation	In orbit	Operational
5 December; 21:20	Return to flight for Vega-C following the VV22 launch failure. Third Sentinel-1 satellite. Originally intended to launch on the Russian Soyuz launch vehicle; due to geopolitical factors, ESA moved Sentinel-1C to a Vega-C launch.					
6 December; 03:14	(Iran) Simorgh		(Iran) Semnan LP-2		(Iran) ISA	
6 December; 03:14	(Iran) Saman-1	ISA	Low Earth	Space tug	20 May 2025	Spacecraft failure
6 December; 03:14	⚀ (Iran) Fakhr-1	ISA	Low Earth	Communications	Unidentified	Spacecraft failure
6 December; 03:14	⚀ (Iran) TBA	TBA	Low Earth	TBA	Unidentified	Spacecraft failure
8 December; 05:12:30	(United States) Falcon 9 Block 5	Starlink Group 12-5	(United States) Cape Canaveral SLC-40		(United States) SpaceX	
8 December; 05:12:30	(United States) Starlink × 10	SpaceX	Low Earth	Communications	In orbit	Operational
8 December; 05:12:30	(United States) Starlink-D2C × 13	SpaceX	Low Earth	Communications	In orbit	Operational
12 December; 07:17	(China) Long March 2D / YZ-3	2D-Y60	(China) Jiuquan SLS-2		(China) CASC	
12 December; 07:17	(China) Gaosu Jiguang Zuanshi Xingzuo Shiyan Xitong (High-Speed Laser Diamond Constellation Test System) × 5	CASC	Low Earth	Technology demonstration	In orbit	Operational
13 December; 21:55:40	(United States) Falcon 9 Block 5	Starlink Group 11-2	(United States) Vandenberg SLC-4E		(United States) SpaceX	
13 December; 21:55:40	(United States) Starlink × 22	SpaceX	Low Earth	Communications	In orbit	Operational
16 December; 10:00	(China) Long March 5B / YZ-2	5B-Y6 / SatNet LEO Group 01	(China) Wenchang LC-1		(China) CASC	
16 December; 10:00	(China) Hulianwang × 10	CASIC	Low Earth (Polar)	Communications	In orbit	Operational
16 December; 10:00	First batch of satellites for the 13,000-satellite Guowang (Xingwang) megaconstellation. Maiden flight of Long March 5B / YZ-2 Variant.					
16 December; 18:50	(China) Long March 2D	2D-Y99	(China) Taiyuan LA-9		(China) CASC	
16 December; 18:50	(China) PIESAT-2 09–12	PIESAT	Low Earth (SSO)	Earth observation	In orbit	Operational
16 December; 18:50	The CZ-2D launcher flew with a 3.8m composite fairing for the first time.					
17 December; 00:52	(United States) Falcon 9 Block 5	F9-410	(United States) Cape Canaveral SLC-40		(United States) SpaceX	
17 December; 00:52	(United States) GPS III-07 Sally Ride (USA-440)	United States Space Force	Medium Earth	Navigation	In orbit	Operational
17 December; 00:52	Rapid Response Trailblazer-1 (RRT-1) Mission. Named after American astronaut Sally Ride, the first American woman in space. GPS III-07, originally scheduled to launch on a ULA Vulcan rocket, was reassigned to the Falcon 9 following uncertainties in Vulcan's readiness. As a result, GPS III-10, originally planned to launch on the Falcon 9, will now launch on Vulcan.					
17 December; 13:19	(United States) Falcon 9 Block 5	F9-411	(United States) Vandenberg SLC-4E		(United States) SpaceX	
17 December; 13:19	(United States) USA-441 - USA-462 (Starshield Group 1-5)	NRO	Low Earth (SSO)	Reconnaissance	In orbit	Operational
17 December; 13:19	NROL-149 Mission (NRO's Proliferated Architecture Mission). Sixth batch consisting of 22 SpaceX/Northrop built Starshield satellites for the National Reconnaissance Office.					
17 December; 20:58	(United States) Falcon 9 Block 5	F9-412	(United States) Kennedy LC-39A		(United States) SpaceX	
17 December; 20:58	(Luxembourg) O3b mPOWER 7 (O3b FM27)	SES S.A.	Medium Earth	Communications	In orbit	Operational
17 December; 20:58	(Luxembourg) O3b mPOWER 8 (O3b FM28)	SES S.A.	Medium Earth	Communications	In orbit	Operational
18 December; 02:00	(Japan) KAIROS	F2	(Japan) Spaceport Kii		(Japan) Space One	
18 December; 02:00	(Japan) TATARA-1	Terra Space	Low Earth	Technology demonstration	18 December; 02:03	Launch Failure
18 December; 02:00	⚀ (Japan) ISHIKI	Hiroo Gakuen	Low Earth	Technology demonstration	18 December; 02:03	Launch Failure
18 December; 02:00	⚀ (Japan) NARIT-Cube 1	TBA	Low Earth	TBA	18 December; 02:03	Launch Failure
18 December; 02:00	⚀ (Taiwan) PARUS-T1A	TASA	Low Earth	TBA	18 December; 02:03	Launch Failure
18 December; 02:00	⚀ (Japan) SC-Sat1	Space Cubics	Low Earth	Technology demonstration	18 December; 02:03	Launch Failure
19 December; 10:18	(China) Ceres-1S	Y4	Dong Fang Hang Tian Gang platform, South China Sea		(China) Galactic Energy	
19 December; 10:18	(China) Tianqi 33–36	Guodian Gaoke	Low Earth	IoT	In orbit	Operational
19 December; 10:18	Mission designated "Loong".					
20 December; 15:12	(China) Long March 3B/E	3B-Y99	(China) Xichang LC-2		(China) CASC	
20 December; 15:12	(China) TJS-12 (Qianshao-3 4)	SAST	GTO to Geosynchronous	SIGINT	In orbit	Operational
21 December; 11:34:24	(United States) Falcon 9 Block 5	Bandwagon-2	(United States) Vandenberg SLC-4E		(United States) SpaceX	
21 December; 11:34:24	(South Korea) 425 Project SAR Sat-2 (KORSAT-2)	DAPA	Low Earth	Reconnaissance	In orbit	Operational
21 December; 11:34:24	(United States) Hawk 11A, 11B, 11C	HawkEye 360	Low Earth	SIGINT	In orbit	Operational
21 December; 11:34:24	(Finland) ICEYE X47, X49	ICEYE	Low Earth (SSO)	Earth observation	In orbit	Operational
21 December; 11:34:24	(United States) Jackal 3	True Anomaly	Low Earth	Technology demonstration	In orbit	Operational
21 December; 11:34:24	(United States) LizzieSat-2	Sidus Space	Low Earth	IoT	In orbit	Operational
21 December; 11:34:24	(United States) Think Orbital 2	Think Orbital	Low Earth	Technology demonstration	In orbit	Operational
21 December; 11:34:24	⚀ (Croatia) CroCube	EVO, Spacemanic	Low Earth (SSO)	Educational / Earth observation	In orbit	Operational
21 December; 11:34:24	⚀ (United States) CTC 0	Spacecoin (Space Telecommunications, Inc)	Low Earth	Technology demonstration / Communications	In orbit	Operational
21 December; 11:34:24	⚀ Djibouti-1B	University of Djibouti	Low Earth	Meteorology	In orbit	Operational
21 December; 11:34:24	⚀ (Czech Republic) LASARsat	DoSpace, Planetum	Low Earth (SSO)	Technology demonstration	In orbit	Operational
21 December; 11:34:24	⚀ (Mongolia) ONDOSAT-OWL 3 – 12	ONDO Space	Low Earth	Amateur radio	In orbit	Operational
21 December; 11:34:24	⚀ (United States) Pleiades - Orpheus	Irvington High School	Low Earth	Educational	In orbit	Operational
21 December; 11:34:24	⚀ (United States) SC1	GITAI	Low Earth	Technology demonstration	In orbit	Operational
21 December; 11:34:24	⚀ (United States) Tomorrow S3, S4	Tomorrow.io	Low Earth	Meteorology	In orbit	Operational
21 December; 11:34:24	⚀ (United States) XCUBE-1	Xplore	Low Earth	Earth observation	In orbit	Operational
21 December; 11:34:24	Dedicated SmallSat Rideshare mission to a 45-degree mid-inclination orbit, designated Bandwagon-2. Third of Five dedicated launches for DAPA 425 Project (425 Project Flight 3). CroCube is the first Croatian satellite.					
21 December; 14:00	(United States) Electron	"Owl The Way Up"	(New Zealand) Mahia LC-1B		(United States) Rocket Lab	
21 December; 14:00	(Japan) StriX-2	Synspective	Low Earth (SSO)	Earth observation	In orbit	Operational
21 December; 14:00	Sixth of 16 dedicated launches for Synspective's StriX constellation.					
23 December; 05:35:30	(United States) Falcon 9 Block 5	Starlink Group 12-2	(United States) Kennedy LC-39A		(United States) SpaceX	
23 December; 05:35:30	(United States) Starlink × 8	SpaceX	Low Earth	Communications	In orbit	Operational
23 December; 05:35:30	(United States) Starlink-D2C × 13	SpaceX	Low Earth	Communications	In orbit	Operational
25 December; 07:45:42	(Russia) Soyuz-2.1b		(Kazakhstan) Baikonur Site 31/6		(Russia) Roscosmos	
25 December; 07:45:42	(Russia) Resurs-P №5	Roscosmos	Low Earth (SSO)	Earth observation	In orbit	Operational
25 December; 07:45:42	2000th launch of the R-7 series of rockets since their introduction in 1957.					
27 December; 01:03	(China) Kinetica 1	Y6	(China) Jiuquan LS-130		(China) CAS Space	
27 December; 01:03	(China) DEAR-3 (B300-L01)	AZSpace	Low Earth (SSO)	Technology demonstration	In orbit	Launch Failure
27 December; 01:03	(China) Yangwang 2	Origin Space	Low Earth (SSO)	TBA	In orbit	Launch Failure
27 December; 01:03	(China) Yinglong 1	TBA	Low Earth (SSO)	TBA	In orbit	Launch Failure
27 December; 01:03	(China) Yixian-A	School of Aeronautics and Astronautics of Sun Yat-sen University	Low Earth (SSO)	TBA	In orbit	Launch Failure
27 December; 01:03	(China) Yunyao-1 × 6	CGSTL	Low Earth (SSO)	Meteorology	In orbit	Launch Failure
27 December; 01:03	⚀ (France) CASAA-Sat	Université d'Aix-Marseille	Low Earth (SSO)	Magnetosphere	In orbit	Launch Failure
29 December; 01:58:30	(United States) Falcon 9 Block 5	Starlink Group 11-3	(United States) Vandenberg SLC-4E		(United States) SpaceX	
29 December; 01:58:30	(United States) Starlink × 22	SpaceX	Low Earth	Communications	In orbit	Operational
29 December; 05:00	(United States) Falcon 9 Block 5	F9-416	(United States) Cape Canaveral SLC-40		(United States) SpaceX	
29 December; 05:00	AGILA (Philippines Sat 2)	Orbits Corp	SSTO to Geosynchronous	Communications	In orbit	Operational
29 December; 05:00	(United States) NuView Alpha	Anuvu	SSTO to Geosynchronous	Communications	In orbit	Operational
29 December; 05:00	(United States) NuView Bravo	Anuvu	SSTO to Geosynchronous	Communications	In orbit	Operational
29 December; 05:00	(United States) UtilitySat-1	Astranis / Pacific Dataport	SSTO to Geosynchronous	Communications	In orbit	En route
29 December; 05:00	Astranis Block 2 mission carrying four MicroGEO satellites, of which three are operated by Astranis and leased to paying customers, while UtilitySat is set to temporarily replace Astranis' Arcturus satellite after a malfunctioning of its solar arrays. Mission Designated "Astranis: From One to Many".					
30 December; 16:30	(India) PSLV-CA	C60	(India) Satish Dhawan FLP		(India) ISRO	
30 December; 16:30	(India) SpaDeX A	ISRO	Low Earth	Technology demonstration	In orbit	Operational
30 December; 16:30	(India) SpaDex B	ISRO	Low Earth	Technology demonstration	In orbit	Operational
30 December; 16:30	The POEM-4 non-deployable platform was hosted on the fourth stage.					
31 December; 05:39:10	(United States) Falcon 9 Block 5	Starlink Group 12-6	(United States) Kennedy LC-39A		(United States) SpaceX	
31 December; 05:39:10	(United States) Starlink × 8	SpaceX	Low Earth	Communications	In orbit	Operational
31 December; 05:39:10	(United States) Starlink-D2C × 13	SpaceX	Low Earth	Communications	In orbit	Operational
← Jan; Feb; Mar; Apr; May; Jun; Jul; Aug; Sep; Oct; Nov; Dec →

== Suborbital flights ==
Date and time (UTC)	Rocket	Flight number	Launch site		LSP	
Date and time (UTC)	Payload (⚀ = CubeSat)	Operator	Orbit	Function	Decay (UTC)	Outcome
Date and time (UTC)	Remarks					
3 July; 11:09	(Poland) ILR-33 AMBER 2K		(Norway) Andøya		(Poland) Warsaw Institute of Aviation	
3 July; 11:09	(Poland)	Warsaw Institute of Aviation	Suborbital	Test flight	3 July	Successful
3 July; 11:09	First Polish rocket to pass the Kármán line. Apogee: 101 km (63 mi).					
16 July	(Canada) Black Brant IX	MaGIXS-2	(United States) White Sands Missile Range		(United States) NASA	
16 July	(United States) MaGIXS-2	Marshall Space Flight Center	Suborbital	Heliophysics	16 July	Successful
16 July	Second flight of the Marshall Grazing Incidence X-ray Spectrometer (MaGIXS).					
22 July	(India) RH-560 Mk-III		(India) Satish Dhawan		(India) ISRO	
22 July	(India) Air Breathing Propulsion Technology	ISRO	Suborbital	Technology demonstration	22 July	Successful
22 July	The Indian Space Research Organisation (ISRO) successfully carried out the second experimental flight for the demonstration of Air Breathing Propulsion Technology. Apogee: 100 km (62 mi).					
13 August; 10:00	(United States) Terrier-Improved Malemute	ROCKSAT-X 2024	(United States) Wallops Flight Facility		(United States) NASA	
13 August; 10:00	(United States) RockSat-X	Colorado Space Grant Consortium	Suborbital	Education	13 August	Successful
13 August; 10:00	Apogee: 164 km (102 mi).					
26 August; 04:00	(Canada) Black Brant IX		(United States) White Sands Missile Range		(United States) NASA	
26 August; 04:00	(United States) OAxFORTIS	Johns Hopkins	Suborbital	Ultraviolet astronomy	26 August	Successful
26 August; 04:00	Off Axis Far-ultraviolet Off Rowland-circle Telescope for Imaging and Spectroscopy (OAxFORTIS). Apogee: 272 km (169 mi).					
29 August; 13:07:03	(United States) New Shepard	NS-26	(United States) Corn Ranch		(United States) Blue Origin	
29 August; 13:07:03	(United States) Blue Origin NS-26	Blue Origin	Suborbital	Crewed spaceflight	29 August	Successful
29 August; 13:07:03	Apogee: 105.3 km (65.4 mi).					
2 September; 09:41:01	(Canada) Black Brant V	BOLT-1B	(Norway) Andøya		(Germany) MORABA	
2 September; 09:41:01	(United States) BOLT-1B	JHUAPL	Suborbital	Laminar–turbulent transition	2 September	Successful
2 September; 09:41:01	Boundary Layer Transition (BOLT) experiment. Apogee: 254 km (158 mi).					
3 September; 19:21:00	(Canada) Black Brant IX		(United States) White Sands Missile Range		(United States) NASA	
3 September; 19:21:00	(United States) FURST	Montana State University	Suborbital	Solar VUV astronomy	3 September	Successful
3 September; 19:21:00	Full-sun Ultraviolet Rocket SpecTrometer (FURST) experiment.					
6 September	(India) Agni-IV		(India) Integrated Test Range		(India) Ministry of Defence	
6 September	(India)	Ministry of Defence	Suborbital	Missile test	6 September	Successful
15 September; 03:30	(Yemen) Toufan		(Yemen)		(Yemen) Houthis	
15 September; 03:30	(Yemen) Live warhead	Houthis	Suborbital	Missile launch	15 September	Intercepted
15 September; 03:30	Apogee: 300 km (190 mi), targeted Israel.					
21 September	(Russia) RS-28 Sarmat		(Russia) Plesetsk		(Russia) RVSN	
21 September	(Russia)	RVSN	Suborbital	Missile test	21 September	Launch failure
25 September; 00:44	(China) DF-31?		(China) Wenchang?		(China) PLA Rocket Force	
25 September; 00:44	(China) Live warhead	PLA	Suborbital	Missile test	25 September	Successful
25 September; 00:44	Apogee: 1,000 km (620 mi), ICBM test launch into Pacific Ocean, 12,000 km (7,500 mi) downrange.					
28 September; 18:00	(United States) Terrier-Oriole?	JAKE	(United States) Wallops Flight Facility		(United States) NASA	
28 September; 18:00	(United States)	Department of Defense	Suborbital	Technology demonstration	28 September	Successful
28 September; 18:00	Apogee: 100 km (62 mi).					
1 October; 13:09	(United States) SpaceLoft XL	SL-15	(United States) Spaceport America		(United States) UP Aerospace	
1 October; 13:09	(United States) FOP	NASA	Suborbital	Education	1 October	Successful
1 October; 13:09	Several payloads of NASA’s Flight Opportunities program were on board.					
1 October; 16:30	(Iran) Shahab-3 / Emad / Kheibar Shekan / Ghadr-110 / Fattah-1		(Iran)		(Iran)	
1 October; 16:30	(Iran)	(Iran)	Suborbital	Missile launch	1 October	Intercepted
1 October; 16:30	Apogee: ~300 km (190 mi). About 181 missile launches.					
13 October; 12:25:00	(United States) Starship	Flight 5	(United States) Starbase OLP-A		(United States) SpaceX	
13 October; 12:25:00	(United States) No payload	SpaceX	Suborbital	Flight test	13 October; 13:30:40	Successful
13 October; 12:25:00	Fifth Starship orbital test flight. Successful controlled return of the Super Heavy booster to the launch site, caught by the arms of the launch tower.					
20 October; 18:24	(United States) Aftershock II		(United States) Black Rock Desert		(United States) USCRPL	
20 October; 18:24	(United States)	USCRPL	Suborbital	Student Rocket	20 October	Successful
20 October; 18:24	Apogee: 143.3 km (89.0 mi).					
23 October; 15:30	(United States) New Shepard	NS-27	(United States) Corn Ranch		(United States) Blue Origin	
23 October; 15:30	(United States) Blue Origin NS-27	Blue Origin	Suborbital	Technology demonstration	23 October	Successful
23 October; 15:30	Apogee: 101 km (63 mi)					
24 October; 23:10	(United States) Terrier-Oriole?		(United States) Wallops Flight Facility		(United States) NASA	
24 October; 23:10	(United States)	Department of Defense	Suborbital	Technology demonstration	24 October	Successful
24 October; 23:10	Apogee: 100 km (62 mi).					
30 October; 22:11	(North Korea) Hwasong-19		(North Korea) Chongdong		(North Korea) KPA Strategic Force	
30 October; 22:11	(North Korea)	KPA Strategic Force	Suborbital	Missile test	30 October	Successful
30 October; 22:11	Apogee: 7,687 km (4,776 mi).					
6 November; 07:01	(United States) Minuteman III	GT-251GM	(United States) Vandenberg LF-10		(United States) AFGSC	
6 November; 07:01	(United States)	AFGSC	Suborbital	Test flight	6 November	Successful
6 November; 07:01	Re-entered ~4,200 mi (6,800 km) downrange near Kwajalein Atoll.					
8 November	(Yemen) Palestine 2		(Yemen)		(Yemen) Houthis	
8 November	(Yemen) Live warhead	Houthis	Suborbital	Missile launch	8 November	Intercepted
8 November	Targeted Israel.					
8 November; 18:14	(United States) SpaceLoft XL	SL-20	(United States) Spaceport America		(United States) UP Aerospace	
8 November; 18:14	(United States) Cyclone-1	Los Alamos National Laboratory	Suborbital	Technology demonstration	8 November	Successful
8 November; 18:14	After reaching apogee, a research payload was released and monitored by Laboratory scientists throughout its descent back to the Earth.					
10 November; 21:36:00	(Canada) Black Brant IX	VortEx 2	(Norway) Andøya		(United States) NASA	
10 November; 21:36:00	(United States) VortEx	Clemson University	Suborbital	Vapor trail deployment	10 November	Successful
10 November; 21:36:00	First of two launches for the Vorticity Experiment (VortEx) mission, carrying trimethylaluminum (TMA) vapor trails. Apogee: 358 km (222 mi).					
10 November; 21:38:00	(United States) Terrier-Improved Orion	VortEx 2	(Norway) Andøya		(United States) NASA	
10 November; 21:38:00	(United States) VortEx	Clemson University	Suborbital	Gravity wave research	10 November	Successful
10 November; 21:38:00	Second of two launches for the VortEx mission, carrying payload instruments. Apogee: 144 km (89 mi).					
11 November; 08:38	(Germany) (United States) Red Kite/Improved Malemute	MAPHEUS 15	(Sweden) Esrange		(Germany) MORABA	
11 November; 08:38	(Germany) MAPHEUS-15	DLR	Suborbital	Microgravity research	11 November	Successful
11 November; 08:38	600th rocket launch from Esrange. Apogee: 309 km (192 mi).					
11 November	(Yemen) Palestine 2		(Yemen)		(Yemen) Houthis	
11 November	(Yemen) Live warhead	Houthis	Suborbital	Missile launch	11 November	Intercepted
11 November	Targeted Israel.					
14 November; 02:30:00	(Japan) S-520	S-520-34	(Japan) Uchinoura Space Center		(Japan) JAXA	
14 November; 02:30:00	(Japan) DES2	JAXA	Suborbital	Technology demonstration	14 November	Successful
14 November; 02:30:00	Demonstration of rotating detonation engine system. Apogee: 217 km (135 mi).					
15 November	(India) LRAShM	LR-02	(India) Integrated Test Range		(India) Ministry of Defence	
15 November	(India) Reentry vehicle	Ministry of Defence	Suborbital	Missile test	15 November	Successful
15 November	Successful test of Indias first Long-Range Hypersonic Missile (LRAShM).					
19 November; 22:00:00	(United States) Starship	Flight 6	(United States) Starbase OLP-A		(United States) SpaceX	
19 November; 22:00:00	(United States) Stuffed banana	SpaceX	Transatmospheric	Flight test	18 November; 23:05:31	Successful
19 November; 22:00:00	Sixth Starship orbital test flight. A stuffed banana served as the Zero-G indicator, becoming Starship's first payload, though it remained within the vehicle for the duration of the flight.					
21 November; 03:00?	(Russia) Oreshnik		(Russia) Kapustin Yar		(Russia) RVSN	
21 November; 03:00?	(Russia) 6 Warheads?	Ministry of Defence	Suborbital	Missile launch	21 November	Successful
21 November; 03:00?	Targeted the Ukrainian city of Dnipro					
22 November; 15:30	(United States) New Shepard	NS-28	(United States) Corn Ranch		(United States) Blue Origin	
22 November; 15:30	(United States) Blue Origin NS-28	Blue Origin	Suborbital	Space tourism	22 November	Successful
22 November; 15:30	Apogee: 107 km (66 mi). Ninth crewed New Shepard flight. Crew of six.					
23 November; 11:58	(Canada) Black Brant IX		(United States) White Sands Missile Range		(United States) NASA	
23 November; 11:58	(United States) B-SPICE	University of Michigan	Suborbital	Spacecraft charging mitigation	23 November	Successful
23 November; 11:58	Beam-Spacecraft Plasma Interaction and Charging Experiment (B-SPICE).					
24 November; 06:00	(United States) HASTE	"HASTE A La Vista"	(United States) MARS LC-2		(United States) Rocket Lab	
24 November; 06:00	(United States) HIPPO	Leidos	Suborbital	Technology demonstration	24 November	Successful
24 November; 06:00	First of four sub-Orbital launches for Leidos under the MACH-TB project.					
26 November; 05:00:00	(Brazil) VSB-30		(Sweden) Esrange		(Sweden) SSC	
26 November; 05:00:00	(Sweden) S1X4-M16	SSC	Suborbital	Microgravity research	26 November	Successful
26 November; 05:00:00	SubOrbital Express Microgravity flight opportunity 4 / MASER 16. Apogee: 256 km (159 mi).					
27 November	(India) K-4		(India) INS Arighaat		(India) Indian Navy	
27 November	(India)	Indian Navy	Suborbital	Missile test	27 November	Successful
27 November	Apogee: ~500 km (310 mi).					
29 November; 16:19	(Brazil) VS-30	V15	(Brazil) Barreira do Inferno Launch Center		(Brazil) Brazilian Space Agency	
29 November; 16:19	(Brazil)	Department of Aerospace Science and Technology	Suborbital	Test flight	29 November 2024	Successful
29 November; 16:19	Operação Potiguar, testing a tracking system					
5 December; 06:05	(New Zealand) Weka Sounding Rocket	Duqm-1	(Oman) Etlaq Spaceport		(Oman) NASCOM	
5 December; 06:05	(Oman) No payload	MTCIT	Suborbital	Test flight	5 December	Successful
5 December; 06:05	Oman's First Suborbital test flight of commercial sounding rocket from its newly established Sounding Rockets Launchpad for commercial uses					
10 December	(United States) MRBM	FEM-02	(United States) Boeing C-17 Globemaster III, Pacific Ocean		(United States) MDA	
10 December	(United States)	MDA	Suborbital	Missile target	10 December	Successful
10 December	Flight Experiment Mission-02 (FEM-02) test of the Aegis Ballistic Missile Defense System. SM-3 Block IIA target.					
10 December	(United States) SM-3 Block IIA	FEM-02	(United States) Andersen Air Force Base		United States Navy	
10 December	(United States) Kill vehicle	United States Navy	Suborbital	Interceptor	10 December	Successful
10 December	Flight Experiment Mission-02 (FEM-02) test of the Aegis Ballistic Missile Defense System. Successful intercept.					
12 December; 16:30	(United States) Long-Range Hypersonic Weapon		(United States) Cape Canaveral SLC-46		United States Army / United States Navy	
12 December; 16:30	(United States) Common-Hypersonic Glide Body (C-HGB)	United States Army / United States Navy	Suborbital	Missile test	12 December	Successful
12 December; 16:30	First live-fire event for the Long-Range Hypersonic Weapon also known as Dark Eagle					
14 December; 01:00	(United States) HASTE	STONEHENGE	(United States) MARS LC-2		(United States) Rocket Lab	
14 December; 01:00	(United States) TBA	TBA	Suborbital	Technology demonstration	14 December	Successful
