= List of spaceflight launches in 2024 =

List of spaceflight launches in 2024 may refer to:

- List of spaceflight launches in January–June 2024
- List of spaceflight launches in July–December 2024
