= Wisseed Sat =

- Mission type: Education

Spacecraft properties
- Spacecraft type: CubeSat

Start of mission
- Launch date: 4 August 2024 UTC (planned)
- Rocket: Falcon 9 Block 5
- Launch site: Cape Canaveral, SLC-40
- Deployed from: ISS Kibō; Delivered by Cygnus NG-21

Orbital parameters
- Reference system: Geocentric
- Regime: Low Earth
- Inclination: 51.6°

Wisseed Sat is a nanosatellite owned by Wisseed-the terra and built by Task and MASUYAMA-MFG. A satellite for education purposes, Wisseed Sat carries the milk teeth of around a dozen children, following the Japanese tradition of throwing one's milk tooth up towards the roof after they have come off to wish for the growth of the new tooth.

== Spacecraft ==
Wisseed Sat was developed by Task and MASUYAMA-MFG. Task is a newspace company founded by Daisuke Furutomo, an engineer who was a member of team Hakuto which competed in the Google Lunar X Prize. MASUYAMA-MFG is a company based in Tottori Prefecture and was in charge of manufacturing the spacecraft parts. The spacecraft is a 10 cm size cube, or a 1U size CubeSat, and wighs less than 1.1kg. After completion, Wisseed Sat was passed on to the Japanese space agency JAXA on 19 April 2024 to be launched by SpaceX.

Wisseed Sat was the culmination of the Wisseed Academy, an education program for children that Wisseed-the terra opened in Meguro, Tokyo, on 13 August 2023. The company promoted it as "space study abroad from age six." After a six-month course, participants graduated by having their baby teeth, described as their "alter egos," launched into space, where the teeth were meant to fly for about three years carrying wishes for peace in the world and the cosmos and for the children's growth. The company said the program was meant to teach children the "ability to survive" in an unpredictable era, and that sending baby teeth into space would stimulate their curiosity and interest in space and science.

== Mission ==
Wisseed Sat carries the milk teeth of around a dozen children to space. In Japan, there is a custom for children to throw their own milk tooth up torwards the roof after they have fallen off, to wish for a healthy new tooth to grow. Wisseed Sat is inspired by that tradition and will fly the teeth all the way to space, to wish that the children will accomplish big things once they have grown up. The satellite is part of Wisseed academy, an education program run by Wisseed-the terra. Wisseed-the terra is an education company based in Tokyo. According to Wisseed-the terra, 'Wisseed' is a portmanteau of wisdom and seed.

Wisseed Sat is planned to be launched by a SpaceX Falcon 9 rocket and will be carried to the International Space Station (ISS) on board the Cygnus NG-21 spacecraft. Wisseed Sat will be deployed from the ISS on a later date.
