= Space Division (Sweden) =

- Rymdavdelningen
- Active: 2023–present
- Country: Sweden
- Branch: Swedish Air Force
- Headquarters: Solna

Commanders
- Commander: Col Ella Carlsson

The Space Division (Note: Swedish: Rymdavdelningen, "Space Division") is a Swedish Air Force division located in the county of Stockholm.

The division leads Sweden's military space capability, including space domain awareness and satellite support to operations.

== History ==
The Defence Act of 2020 tasked the Swedish Air Force with developing national defence capabilities in space, reflecting a growing recognition of the strategic importance of the domain and the need to safeguard national sovereignty. As a result, the Space Division was formally established in 2023.

In October 2024 the Swedish government allocated approximately SEK 1 billion to strengthen national space capability, with a focus on infrastructure for rapid launch and the ability to replace satellites if needed. This decision aimed to ensure resilience and secure access to space-based services for the armed forces.

On 16 August 2024 the Space Division’s first satellite, GNA-3, was launched from Vandenberg Space Force Base in California on a SpaceX Falcon 9 rocket. Developed in cooperation with the Swedish Space Corporation and the Defence Research Agency, GNA-3 serves as a technology demonstrator for secure communications and satellite operations. The launch marked Sweden's first dedicated military satellite and represented a major step in building national space competence.

== Role ==
The Space Division is responsible for the Swedish Armed Forces' activities in the space domain. Its primary tasks include maintaining space situational awareness, providing satellite communications and intelligence support, and developing national competence in military space operations. The division also represents Sweden in international cooperation on space security, working with allied and partner nations as well as civilian organisations.

== Commanders ==
- 2023–present: Col Ella Carlsson

== Attributes ==
Name	Translation	From		To
Rymdavdelningen	Space Division	2023-??-??	–	
Location		From		To
Solna		2023-??-??	–	

== Sources ==
- Balkander, Mattias (2024-05-20). "Försvaret vill skjuta upp militära satelliter från Kiruna". Göteborgs-Posten (in Swedish).
- Headquarters (2022-07-11). "Rymden – den nya frontlinjen". Swedish Armed Forces (in Swedish).
- Air Force (2025-01-31). "Sveriges första militära satellit uppsänd". Swedish Armed Forces (in Swedish).
- Arbetsgivarverket (2025-05-12). ""Jag är glad att man inser rymdens nytta för samhället"". Swedish Agency for Government Employers (in Swedish).
- Ek, Bo Torbjörn (2025-01-31). "Musks bolag har skjutit upp svensk militär satellit". Dagens Nyheter (in Swedish).
- Schelin, Adam (2024-10-04). "Försvarsmakten tilldelas en rymdmiljard för att utöka rymdförmågorna". Government of Sweden (in Swedish).
- Schelin, Adam (31 Jan 2025). "Sveriges första militära satellit nu uppskjuten i rymden". Government of Sweden (in Swedish).
- FMV (4 Dec 2024). "Hur omsätter FMV regeringens beslut om satsning på rymdförmåga?". Swedish Defence Materiel Administration (in Swedish).
- Government (2024). "Rymden – en strategisk och operativ domän". Government of Sweden (in Swedish).
- Ahlander, Johan; Mayberry, Kate (31 Jan 2025). "Sweden successfully launched military satellite in August". Reuters.
