= Progress MS-28 =

2024 Russian resupply spaceflight to the ISS

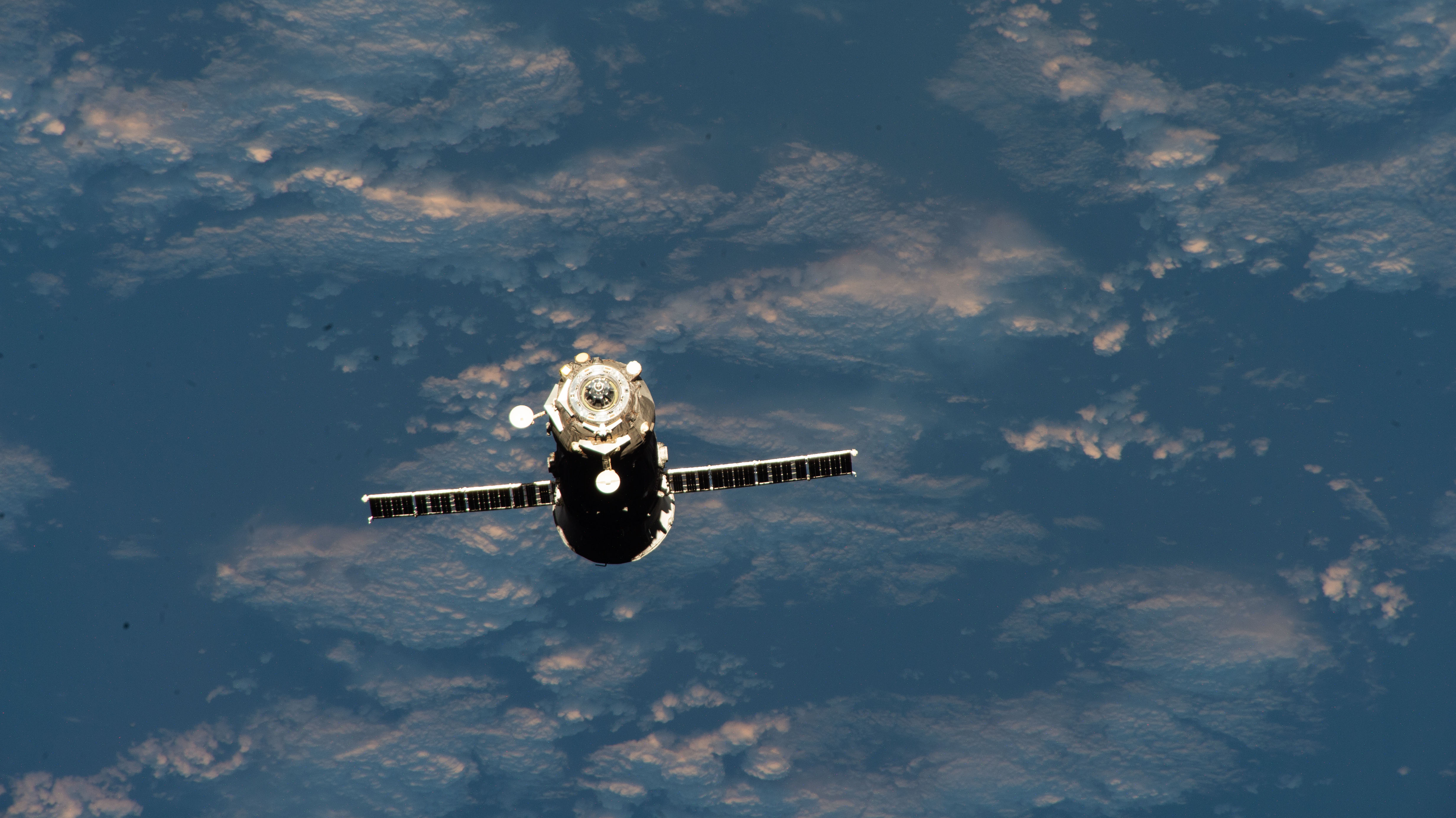
- Progress MS-28 as it departs from the ISS
- Names: Progress 89; ISS 89P
- Mission type: ISS resupply
- Operator: Roscosmos
- COSPAR ID: 2024-145A
- SATCAT no.: 60450
- Mission duration: 194 days, 20 hours, 3 minutes

Spacecraft properties
- Spacecraft: Progress MS-28 No. 458
- Spacecraft type: Progress MS
- Manufacturer: Energia
- Launch mass: 7,280 kg (16,050 lb)
- Payload mass: 2,621 kg (5,778 lb)

Start of mission
- Launch date: 15 August 2024, 03:20:17 UTC (08:20:17 AQTT)
- Rocket: Soyuz-2.1a
- Launch site: Baikonur, Site 31/6
- Contractor: RKTs Progress

End of mission
- Disposal: Deorbited
- Decay date: 25 February 2025, 23:23 UTC

Orbital parameters
- Reference system: Geocentric orbit
- Regime: Low Earth orbit
- Inclination: 51.65°

Docking with ISS
- Docking port: Zvezda aft
- Docking date: 17 August 2024, 05:55:07 UTC
- Undocking date: 25 February 2025, 20:17:33 UTC
- Time docked: 192 days, 14 hours, 22 minutes

Cargo
- Mass: 2,621 kg (5,778 lb)
- Pressurised: 1,201 kg (2,648 lb)
- Fuel: 950 kg (2,090 lb)
- Gaseous: 50 kg (110 lb)
- Water: 420 kg (930 lb)

Progress MS-28 (Russian: Прогресс МC-28), Russian production No. 458, identified by NASA as Progress 89, was a Progress spaceflight launched by Roscosmos to resupply the International Space Station (ISS). It is the 181st flight of a Progress spacecraft.

== Mission ==
Launched from Site 31/6 at the Baikonur Cosmodrome in Kazakhstan atop a Soyuz-2.1a on Thursday, 15 August 2024, at 03:20:17 UTC (08:20:17 AQTT, local time at the launch site). Progress MS-28 will deliver approximately 2,621 kg (5,778 lb) of food, water, clothing, fuel, and equipment to the ISS for the Expedition 71 and to prepare the station for the Expedition 72 crew.

The spacecraft autonomously docked with the ISS on 17 August 2024, at 05:55:07 UTC UTC. It attached to the aft port of the Zvezda module, replacing the Progress MS-26 spacecraft that was previously at the location.

After six months docked to the ISS, in preparation for the launch of the Progress MS-30 cargo mission, Progress MS-28 undocked on 25 February 2025 at 20:17:33 UTC. The braking maneuver started at 23:21 UTC and the spacecraft began to reenter Earth's atmosphere over the Southern Pacific Ocean around two minutes later. Its surviving debris were estimated to impact the ocean surface at around 01:05 UTC on 26 February.

== Manifest ==
Each Progress mission delivers over a thousand kilograms of supplies in its pressurized section, accessible to crewmembers. These supplies include consumables such as food, water, and air, along with equipment for maintenance and scientific research. In its unpressurized section, the spacecraft carries tanks of water, fuel, and gases to replenish the station’s resources and sustain its onboard atmosphere. These resources are transferred to the station through an automated process.

For this mission, Progress MS-28 was loaded with a total of 2,621 kg (5,778 lb) of cargo and supplies prior to launch. The cargo manifest includes the following:

- Pressurized supplies: 1,201 kg (2,648 lb)
- Fuel: 950 kg (2,090 lb)
- Water: 420 kg (930 lb)
- Nitrogen gas: 50 kg (110 lb)

== Orbital maneuvers ==
Progress MS-28 cargo spacecraft performed a series of orbital maneuvers to maintain and adjust the International Space Station's (ISS) trajectory. These come in the form of periodic "reboosts" to counteract atmospheric drag on the station or collision avoidance maneuvers, moving the station to dodge a piece of debris flying through space.

- 27 August 2024, 21:46 UTC: A 1,075.42-second burn increased velocity by 1.95 m/s (6.4 ft/s), raising the ISS's altitude by 3.4 km (2.1 mi) to 419.41 km (260.61 mi), preparing for Soyuz MS-25's departure and Soyuz MS-26's launch.
- 5 September 2024, 19:45 UTC: A 781.98-second burn increased velocity by 1.42 m/s (4.7 ft/s), raising the altitude by 2.48 km (1.54 mi) to 420.7 km (261.4 mi), finalizing adjustments for Soyuz MS-25's departure and Soyuz MS-26's launch.
- 4 October 2024, 08:44 UTC: A 1,207.62-second burn increased velocity by 1.66 m/s (5.4 ft/s), raising the altitude by 2.9 km (1.8 mi) to 419 km (260 mi).
- 13 November 2024, 16:47 UTC: A 1,894.4-second burn increased velocity by 2.82 m/s (9.3 ft/s), raising the altitude by 4.9 km (3.0 mi) to 417.23 km (259.25 mi), preparing for Progress MS-29's arrival.
- 19 November 2024, 20:09 UTC: A 330.90-second burn for collision avoidance delivered a 0.5 m/s (1.6 ft/s) velocity change, raising altitude by 800 m (2,600 ft) to reach a 430.86 km × 416.20 km (267.72 mi × 258.61 mi) orbit.
- 25 November 2024, 09:49 UTC: Another collision avoidance maneuver lasting 211.96 seconds, delivering a 0.3 m/s (0.98 ft/s) velocity change, raising altitude by 500 m (1,600 ft) to a 430.40 km × 417.81 km (267.44 mi × 259.62 mi) orbit.
- 22 December 2024, 01:10 UTC: A 811.3-second burn increased velocity by 1.3 m/s (4.3 ft/s), raising the ISS's altitude by 2.3 km (1.4 mi) to 416.43 km (258.76 mi), preparing for Soyuz MS-26's departure and Soyuz MS-27's launch.
- 11 January 2025, 17:45 UTC: A 1,155-second burn increased velocity by 1.8 m/s (5.9 ft/s), raising the ISS's altitude by 3.2 km (2.0 mi) to 416.71 km (258.93 mi), preparing for Soyuz MS-26's departure and Soyuz MS-27's launch.
- 1 February 2025, 08:58 UTC: A 1,227.2-second burn increased velocity by 1.82 m/s (6.0 ft/s), raising the ISS's altitude by 3.2 km (2.0 mi) to 417.44 km (259.39 mi), preparing for Soyuz MS-26's departure and Soyuz MS-27's launch.
- 20 February 2025, 01:30 UTC: A 1,341.2-second burn increased velocity by 1.95 m/s (6.4 ft/s), raising the ISS's altitude by 3.4 km (2.1 mi) to 419 km (260 mi), preparing for Soyuz MS-26's departure and Soyuz MS-27's launch.

== See also ==
- Uncrewed spaceflights to the International Space Station
- List of Progress missions
