= Cygnus NG-21 =

Summer 2024 cargo mission to the ISS

NG-21
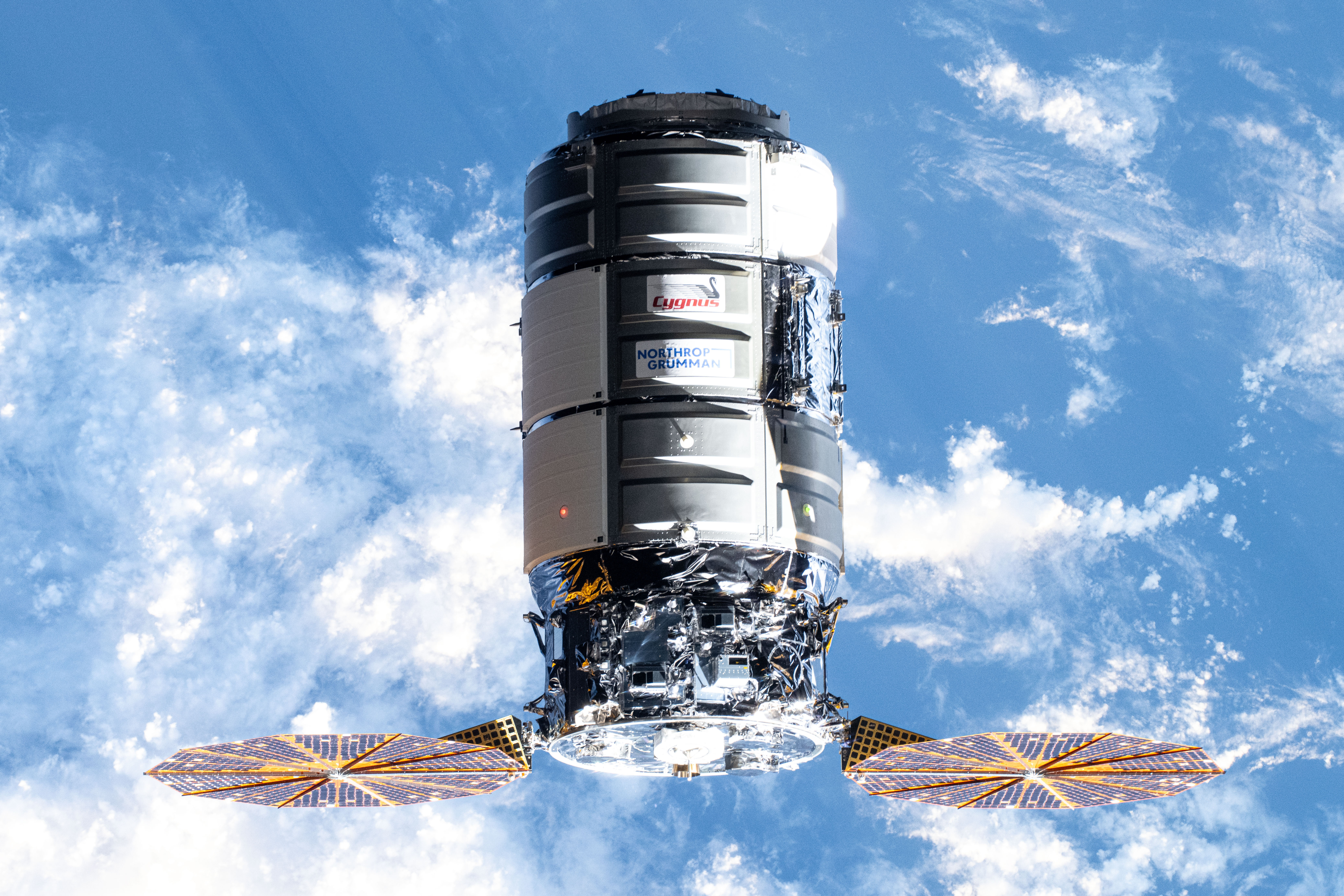
- S.S. Francis R. "Dick" Scobee (NG-21) spacecraft approaches the ISS
- Names: CRS NG-21
- Mission type: ISS resupply
- Operator: Northrop Grumman
- COSPAR ID: 2024-139A
- SATCAT no.: 60378
- Mission duration: 237 days, 19 hours and 12 minutes

Spacecraft properties
- Spacecraft: S.S. Francis R. "Dick" Scobee
- Spacecraft type: Enhanced Cygnus
- Manufacturer: Northrop Grumman; Thales Alenia Space

Start of mission
- Launch date: 4 August 2024, 15:02:53 UTC (11:02:53 am EDT)
- Rocket: Falcon 9 Block 5 B1080-10
- Launch site: Cape Canaveral, SLC‑40
- Contractor: SpaceX

End of mission
- Disposal: Deorbited
- Decay date: 30 March 2025, 10:15 UTC

Orbital parameters
- Reference system: Geocentric orbit
- Regime: Low Earth orbit
- Inclination: 51.66°

Berthing at ISS
- Berthing port: Unity nadir
- RMS capture: 6 August 2024, 07:11 UTC
- Berthing date: 6 August 2024, 09:33 UTC
- Unberthing date: 28 March 2025, 08:50 UTC
- RMS release: 28 March 2025, 10:57 UTC
- Time berthed: 233 days, 23 hours and 17 minutes

Cargo
- Mass: 3,857 kg (8,503 lb)
- Pressurised: 3,843 kg (8,472 lb)
- Unpressurised: 14 kg (31 lb)
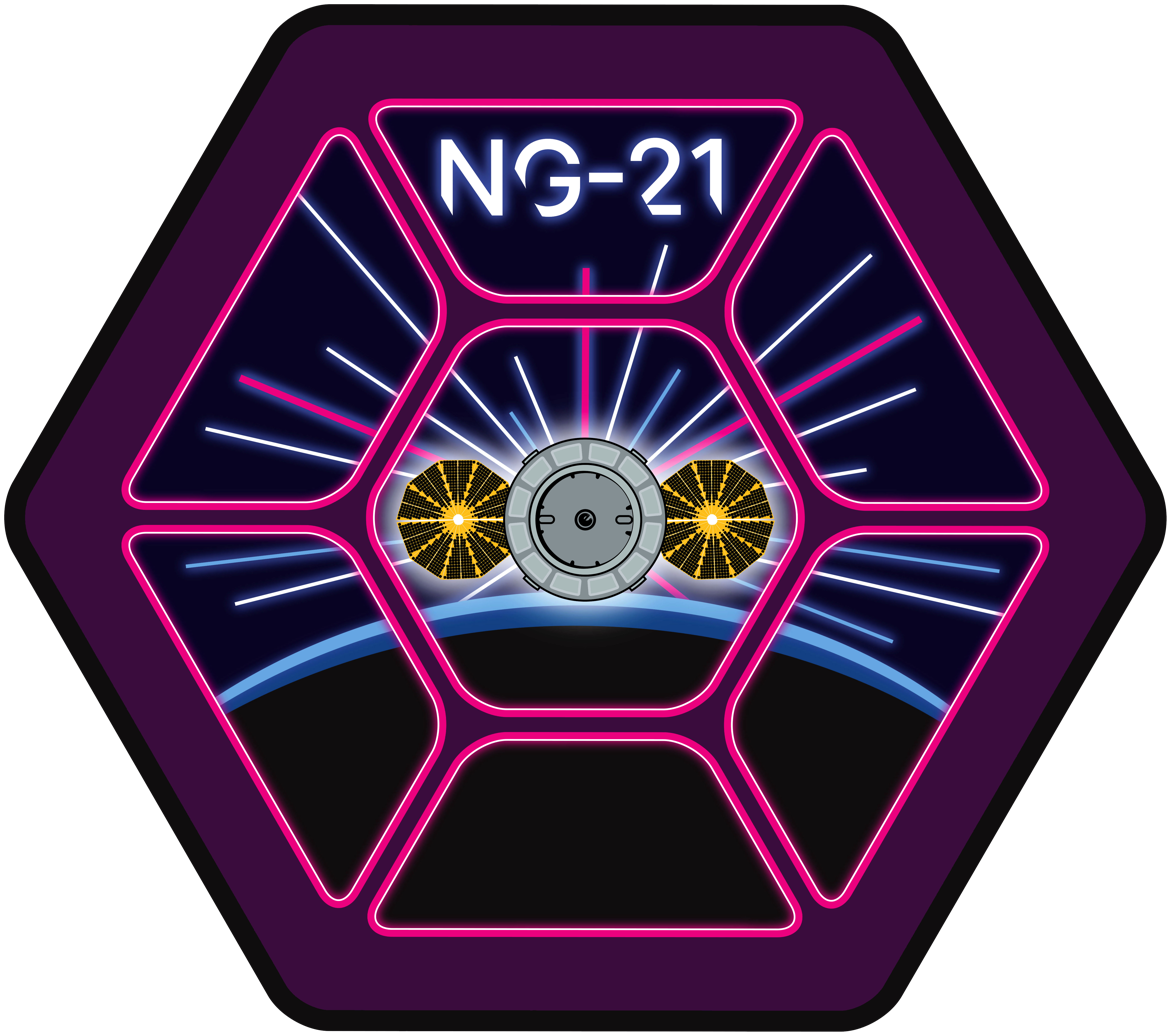
- Mission patch Commercial Resupply Services Cygnus flights

NG-21 was the twenty-first flight of the Cygnus, an expendable American cargo spacecraft used for International Space Station (ISS) logistics missions, that launched on 4 August 2024 and was deorbited on 30 March 2025. It was operated by Northrop Grumman under a Commercial Resupply Services contract with NASA. The spacecraft was an Enhanced Cygnus, named the S.S. Francis R. "Dick" Scobee in honor of the NASA astronaut who died in the Space Shuttle Challenger disaster.

NG-21 was the second launch of a Cygnus spacecraft after Northrop Grumman exhausted the supply of its Antares 230+ rocket. The Antares used a Russian-built engine and Ukrainian-built first stage, and production ceased after the Russian invasion of Ukraine. Northrop Grumman expects its next-generation Antares 300 rocket that does not depend on Ukrainian or Russian parts to be ready to fly NG-23. As an interim solution, Northrop Grumman contracted with its CRS competitor SpaceX to launch NG-20, 21 and 22 using its Falcon 9 Block 5 rocket.

== History ==
Cygnus was developed by Orbital Sciences Corporation, partially funded by NASA under the agency's Commercial Orbital Transportation Services program. To create Cygnus, Orbital paired the Multi-Purpose Logistics Module, built by Thales Alenia Space and previously used by the Space Shuttle for ISS logistics, with a service module based on Orbital's GEOStar, a satellite bus. The larger Enhanced Cygnus was introduced in 2015. Orbital Sciences was renamed Orbital ATK in 2015 and Northrop Grumman purchased Orbital in 2018 and has continued to operate Cygnus missions.

Cygnus NG-21 is the tenth Cygnus mission under the Commercial Resupply Services-2 contract.

Production and integration of Cygnus spacecraft are performed in Dulles, Virginia. The Cygnus service module is mated with the pressurized cargo module at the launch site, and mission operations are conducted from control centers in Dulles, Virginia and Houston, Texas.

The NG-21 spacecraft was named the S.S. Francis R. "Dick" Scobee in honor of the NASA astronaut who died in the Space Shuttle Challenger disaster. This is the sixteenth flight of the Enhanced-sized Cygnus PCM.

== Manifest ==
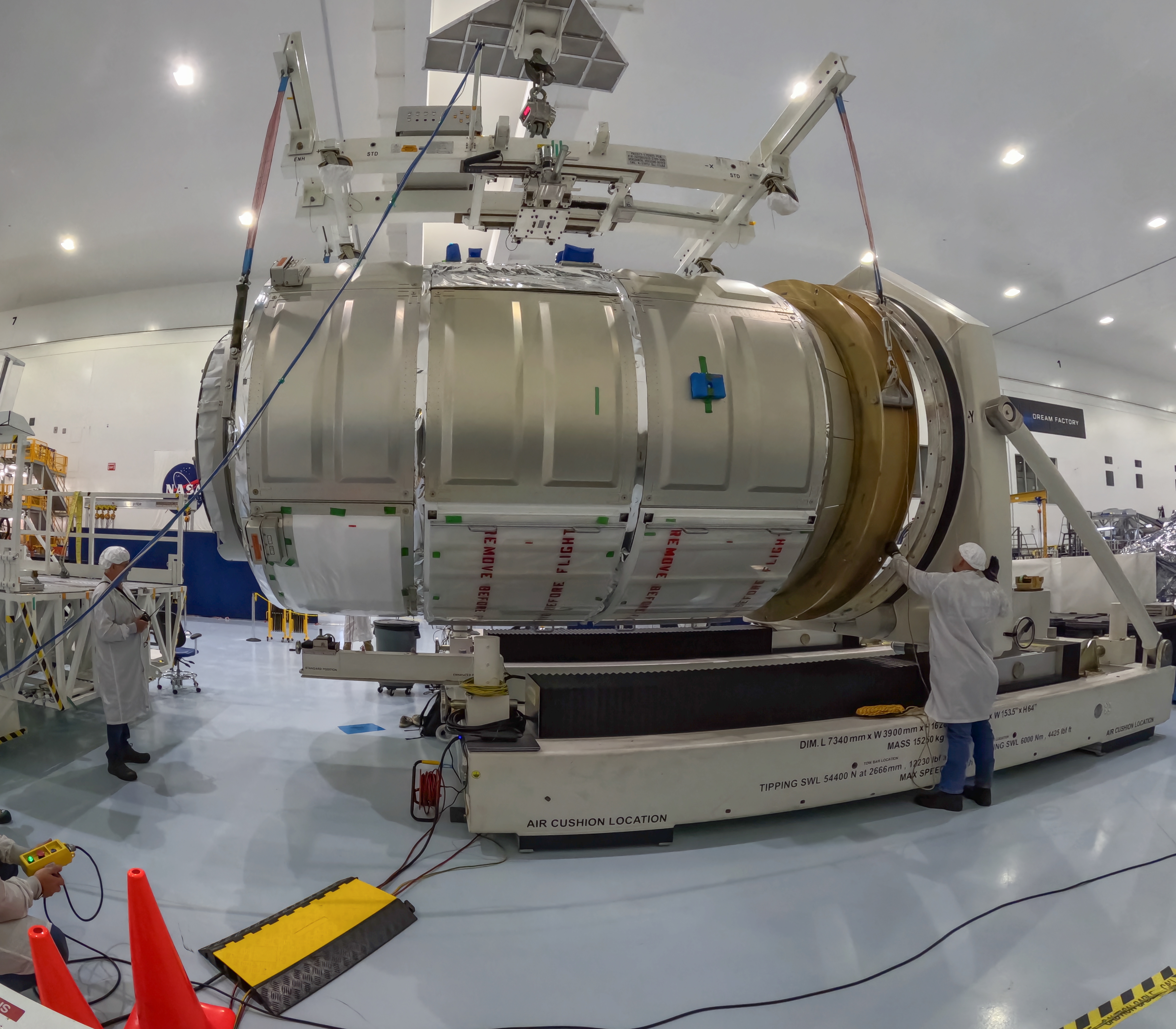
The pressurized cargo module is lifted and moved by a crane inside the Space Systems Processing Facility at NASA’s Kennedy Space Center in Florida on 1 June 2024.

The Cygnus spacecraft was loaded with a total of 3,857 kilograms (8,503 lb) of cargo and supplies before its launch, including 3,843 kilograms (8,472 lb) of pressurised and 14 kilograms (31 lb) of unpressurised cargo.

The cargo manifest is broken down as follows:

- Crew supplies: 1,021 kg (2,251 lb)
- Science investigations: 1,220 kg (2,690 lb)
- Spacewalk equipment: 43 kg (95 lb)
- Vehicle hardware: 1,560 kg (3,440 lb)
- Computer resources: 13 kg (29 lb)

A repair kit for the NICER telescope will be delivered to the station on this mission.

Due to issues with Boeing Crew Flight Test, the manifest was changed to transfer additional crew supplies to the ISS for the additional astronauts (six US astronauts rather than the expected four).

== Research ==
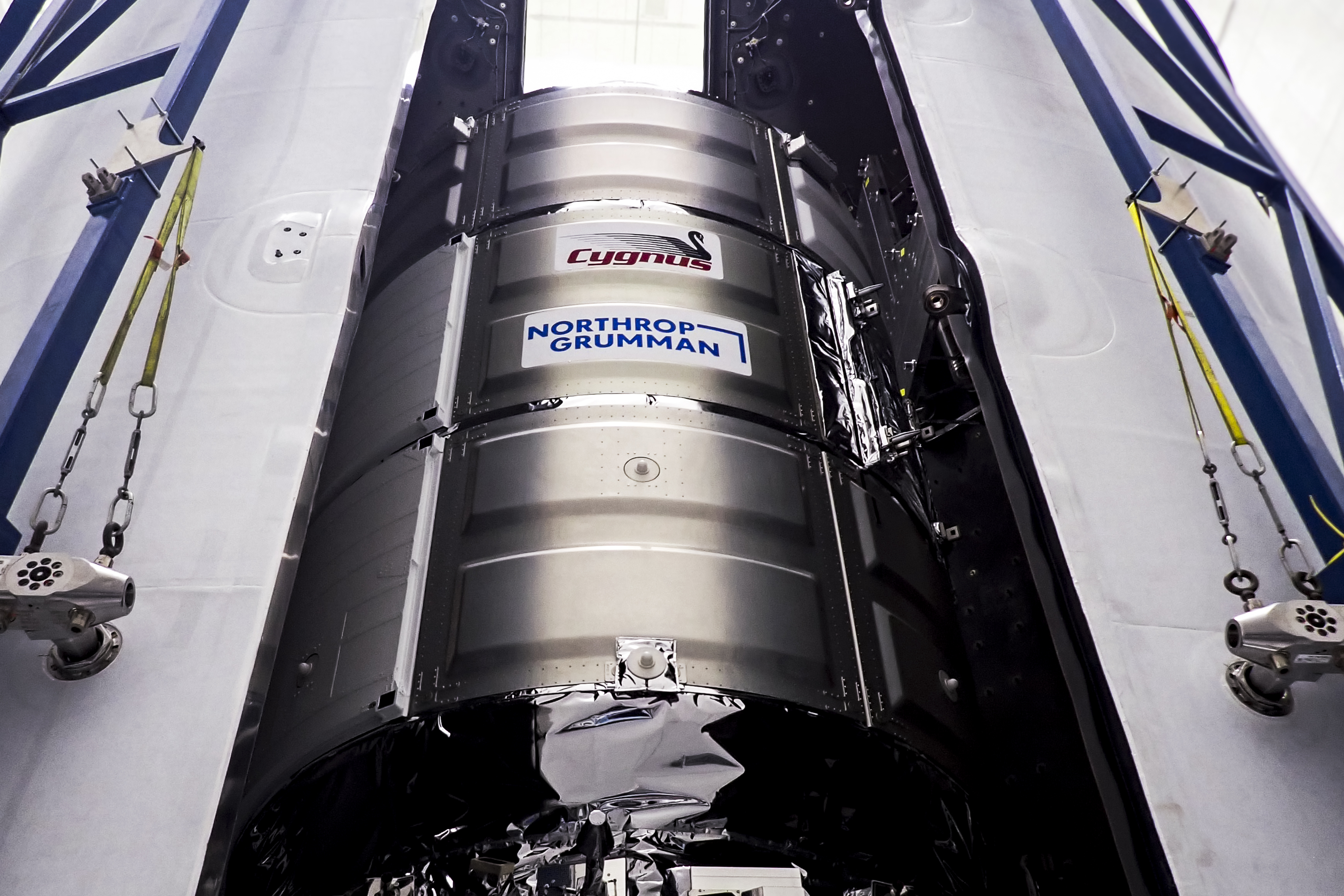
S.S. Francis R. "Dick" Scobee (NG-21) spacecraft is seen being encapsulated inside the SpaceX Falcon 9 payload fairing as it prepares to launch

Several scientific investigations were sent to the ISS aboard the Cygnus. These are four of the projects highlighted by NASA:

=== Packed systems ===
"Packed Bed Reactor Experiment: Water Recovery Series" will evaluate gravity's effects on eight test articles. Packed bed reactors are systems that use materials such as pellets or beads packed inside a structure to increase contact between different phases of fluids, such as liquid and gas. These reactors are used for various applications, including water recovery, thermal management, and fuel cells. Scientists previously tested the performance in space of glass beads, Teflon beads, a platinum catalyst, and other packing materials. Results could help optimize the design and operation of packed bed reactors for water filtration and other systems in microgravity and on the Moon and Mars. Insights from the investigation also could lead to improvements in this technology for applications on Earth such as water purification and heating and cooling systems.

=== Education ===
"STEMonstrations Screaming Balloon" is an educational demonstration using a balloon, a penny, and a hexagonal nut (the kind used to secure a bolt). The penny and the nut are whirled separately inside an inflated balloon to compare their sounds. NASA's STEMonstration program are educational lessons illustrating a different scientific concept performed and recorded by astronauts on the space station and include resources to help teachers further explore the topics with their students.

=== Stem cells ===
"In-Space Expansion of Hematopoietic Stem Cells for Clinical Application" (InSPA-StemCellEX-H1) continues testing a technology to produce human hematopoietic stem cells (HSCs) in space. HSCs give rise to blood and immune cells and are used in therapies for patients with certain blood diseases, autoimmune disorders, and cancers.

The investigation uses a system called BioServe In-space Cell Expansion Platform (BICEP), which is designed to expand HSCs three hundredfold without the need to change or add new growth media. BICEP affords a streamlined operation to harvest and cryopreserve cells for return to Earth and delivery to a designated medical provider and patient.

This investigation demonstrates whether expanding stem cells in microgravity could generate far more continuously renewing stem cells. This work eventually could lead to large-scale production facilities, with donor cells launched into orbit and cellular therapies returned to Earth. The biotechnology investigation also seeks to improve therapies for blood diseases and cancers such as leukemia.

=== DNA repair in space ===
"Rotifer-B2", an ESA (European Space Agency) investigation, explores how spaceflight affects DNA repair mechanisms in a microscopic bdelloid rotifer, Adineta vaga. These tiny but complex organisms are known for their ability to withstand harsh conditions, including radiation doses 100 times higher than human cells can survive. The organisms are dried, exposed to high radiation levels on Earth, and rehydrated and cultured in an incubator on the station.

Previous research indicates that rotifers repair their DNA in space with the same efficiency as on Earth, but that research provided only genetic data. This experiment will provide the first visual proof of survival and reproduction during spaceflight. Results could provide insights into how spaceflight affects the rotifer's ability to repair sections of damaged DNA in a microgravity environment and could improve the general understanding of DNA damage and repair mechanisms for applications on Earth. This mission also delivers plants for the APEX-09 investigation, which examines plant responses to stressful environments and could inform the design of bio-regenerative support systems on future space missions.

== Mission ==
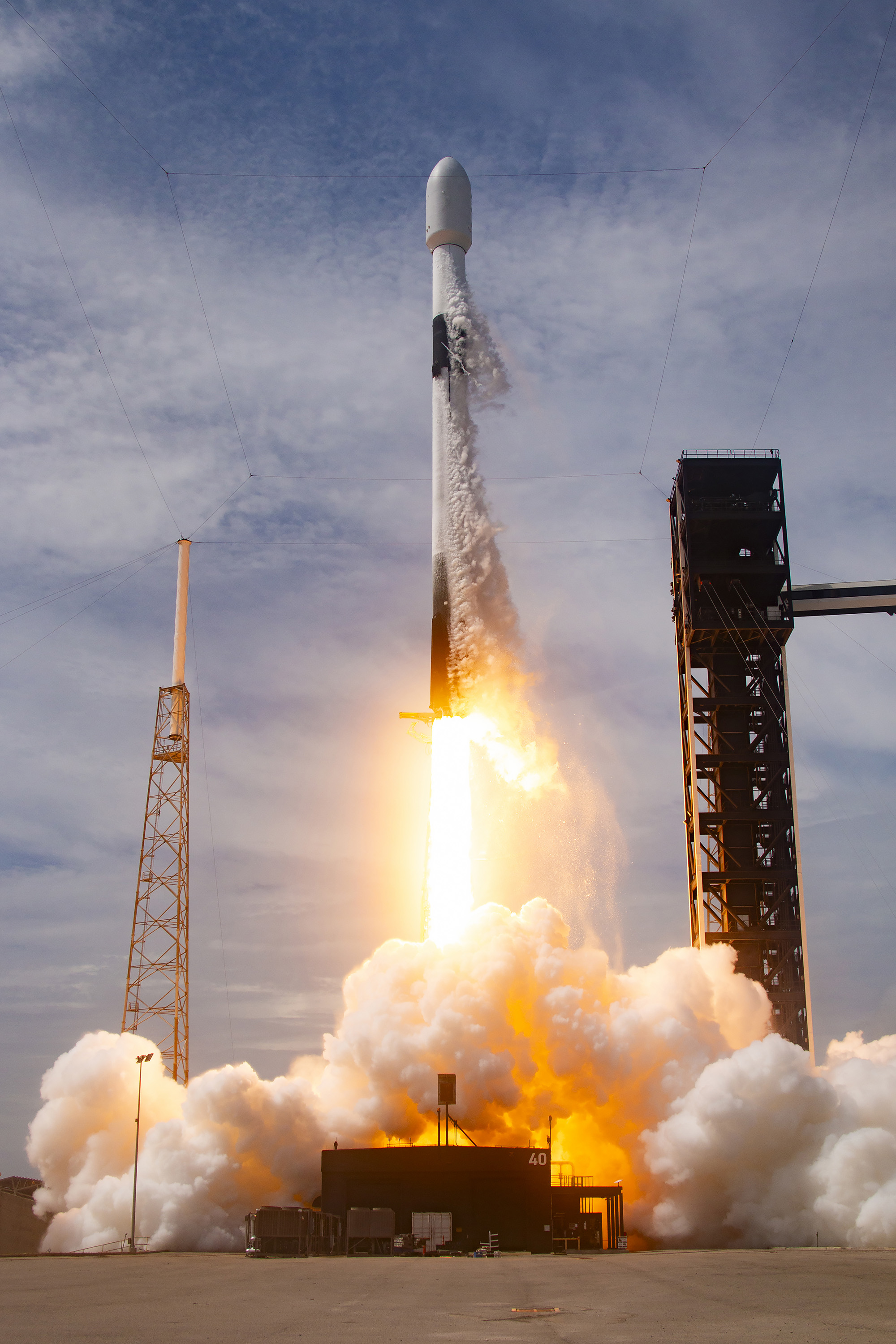
Falcon 9 lifts off carrying NG-21 to the ISS

While most Cygnus missions have been launched atop Northrop Grumman's Antares rocket from the Mid-Atlantic Regional Spaceport, NG-21 was the second of three missions planned to launch atop the Falcon 9 Block 5 rocket from the Cape Canaveral Space Force Station.

Northrop Grumman exhausted the supply of its Antares 230+ rocket after the NG-19 mission. The Antares used a Russian-built engine and Ukrainian-built first stage, and production ceased after the Russian invasion of Ukraine. Northrop Grumman expects its next-generation Antares 300 rocket that does not depend on Ukrainian or Russian parts to be ready to fly NG-23 in August 2025. As an interim solution, Northrop Grumman contracted with its CRS competitor SpaceX to launch NG-20, 21 and 22 using its Falcon 9 rocket.

To accommodate the Cygnus, SpaceX modified their payload fairing to add a 5 ft × 4 ft (1.5 m × 1.2 m) side hatch to load late cargo onto the spacecraft from the cleanroom located at the end of the crew access arm installed at Space Launch Complex 40. The mission used Falcon 9 first-stage booster #1080 on its tenth mission.

The rocket was first scheduled to lift off on 3 August 2024 at 15:28:00 UTC (11:29 am EDT, local time at the launch site) but was scrubbed due to poor weather conditions. The launch was rescheduled and successfully lifted off on 4 August 2024 at 15:02:23 UTC (11:02 am EDT). The first stage successfully touched down at Landing Zone 1 at the end of its flight.

After Cygnus separated from the Falcon's second stage, the spacecraft missed its first scheduled burn at 15:44 UTC due to a late entry to burn sequencing. The burn was rescheduled for 16:34 UTC, but was aborted when engine sensors registered low initial pressure. The Cygnus deployed its two solar arrays at 18:21 UTC as Northrop Grumman engineers investigated the issues. The pressure reading was determined to be acceptable, and the Northrop Grumman was able to command the Cygnus to make two burns to put it on a trajectory to meet the station at the previously scheduled time.

NASA astronaut Matthew Dominick captured Cygnus using the station's robotic arm on 6 August 2024 at 07:11 UTC and the spacecraft was berthed to the Unity module's nadir (Earth-facing) port at about 09:33 UTC.

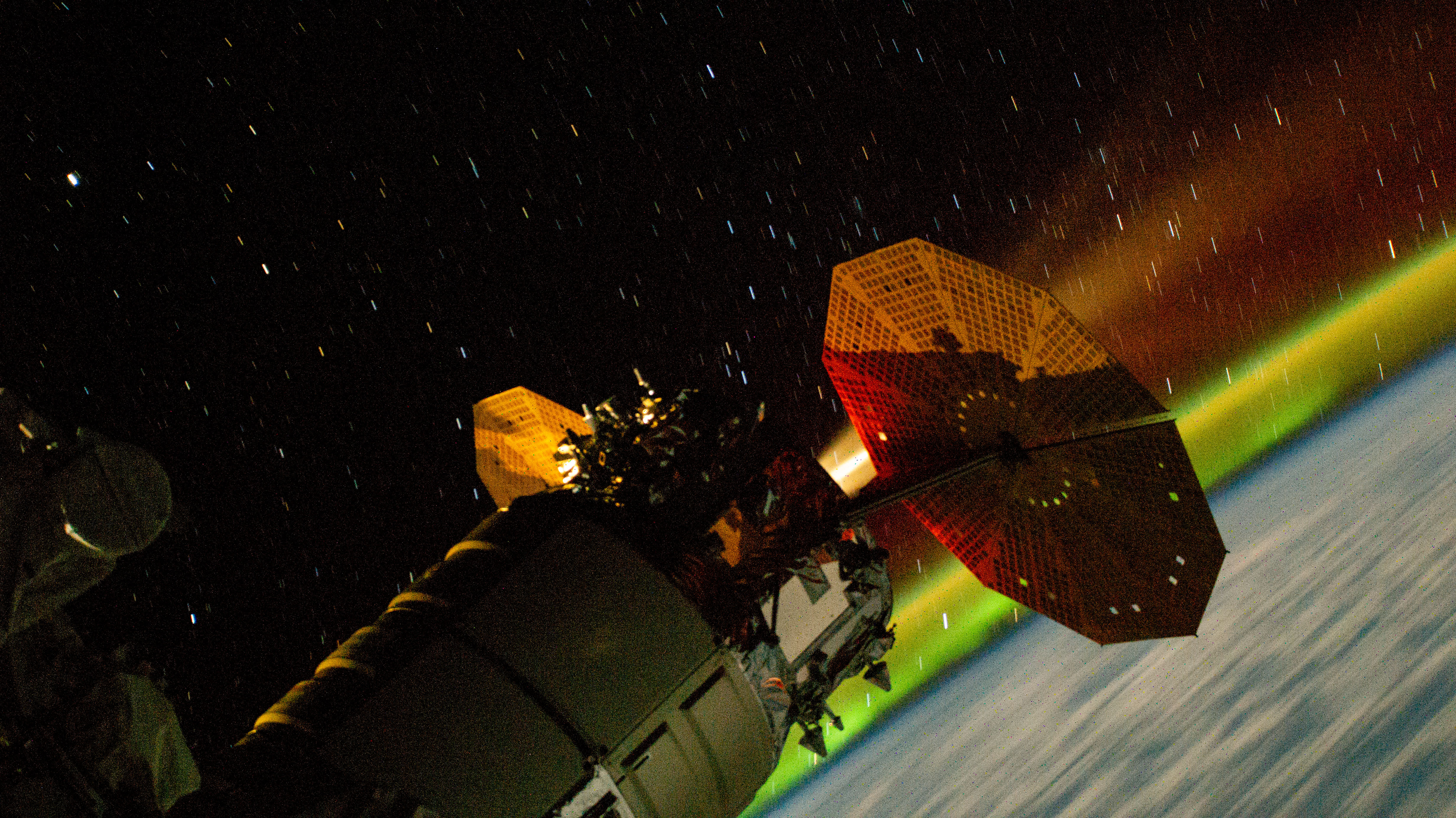
NG-21 firing its engine to reboost the ISS

On 22 August, the Cygnus engine was fired for over 19 minutes to raise the orbital altitude of the ISS to 418.4 by 415.0 kilometres (260 by 257.9 mi). These periodic "reboosts" counteract atmospheric drag on the station. The Cygnus has been available to do reboosts on an as-needed basis since the NG-17 mission, after being successfully demonstrated on flight OA-9E. Russia's Progress cargo spacecraft also regularly perform reboosts during missions to the ISS.

The spacecraft departure is planned for 21 March 2025 at 11:15 UTC.

=== Launch attempt summary ===
Note: Times are local to the launch site (Eastern Daylight Time).

Attempt	Planned	Result	Turnaround	Reason	Decision point	Weather go (%)	Notes
1	3 Aug 2024, 11:29:00 am	Scrubbed	—	Weather	(T−01:00:43)	50	
2	4 Aug 2024, 11:02:53 am	Success	0 days 23 hours 34 minutes			35	Weather initially forecasted at 10%.

== See also ==
- Uncrewed spaceflights to the International Space Station
