= List of Vulcan launches =

This is a list of launches made by the Vulcan Centaur rocket since its maiden launch on January 8, 2024. All future launches are on hold pending an investigation.

== Notable missions ==
=== Peregrine Mission One ===
Peregrine Mission One was a lunar lander built by Astrobotic Technology, selected as a part of NASA's Commercial Lunar Payload Services program. It was launched on the maiden flight of Vulcan Centaur on January 8, 2024, at 07:18 UTC. The Vulcan Centaur successfully placed Peregrine into trans-lunar injection, however, following a fuel leak with the spacecraft unrelated to the Vulcan Centaur, the lander failed in its attempt to land on the Moon.

== Launch statistics ==
Launch outcomes

- Failure
- Partial failure
- Success
- Planned

Launch sites

- Cape Canaveral, SLC‑41
- Vandenberg, SLC‑3E

Rocket configurations

- VC0
- VC2
- VC4
- VC6

== Launch history ==
=== 2024 ===
Flight No.	Date / time (UTC)	Configuration (Serial)	Launch site	Payload	Payload mass	Orbit	Customer	Outcome
1	January 8, 2024; 07:18	VC2S (V‑001)	Cape Canaveral, SLC‑41	Peregrine lander	1,283 kg (2,829 lb)	TLI	Astrobotic Technology	Success
1	January 8, 2024; 07:18	VC2S (V‑001)	Cape Canaveral, SLC‑41	Enterprise (space burial)	1,283 kg (2,829 lb)	Heliocentric	Celestis	Success
1	Maiden flight of Vulcan Centaur and VC2S Configuration. Certification-1 mission, the first of two launches needed to certify the rocket for National Security Space Launch (NSSL) missions. Payload from Celestis, demonstrated engine restart capability of the Centaur upper stage delivering multiple payloads to different orbits. The Peregrine payload failed in transit to the Moon, precluding a landing attempt, due to reasons unrelated to the launch vehicle.							
2	October 4, 2024; 11:25	VC2S (V‑002)	Cape Canaveral, SLC‑41	Mass simulator	1,500 kg (3,300 lb)	Heliocentric	United Launch Alliance	Success
2	Certification-2 mission, the second of two launches needed to certify the rocket for NSSL missions. Originally scheduled to carry the first flight of Dream Chaser; however, due to schedule delays with Dream Chaser, ULA flew a mass simulator with experiments and demonstrations of future Centaur V technologies. Approximately 37 seconds into the launch, the nozzle on one of solid rocket boosters (SRB) fell off resulting in a shower of debris in the exhaust plume. Although the SRB continued to function for its full 90-second burn, the loss of the nozzle led to reduced and asymmetrical thrust causing the rocket to momentarily tilt slightly. The guidance system adjusted the main engines and extended their burn by roughly 20 seconds to compensate for the loss with the rocket achieving nominal orbital insertion. The nozzle failure was attributed to a manufacturing defect in an insulator located inside the nozzle.							

=== 2025 ===
Flight No.	Date / time (UTC)	Configuration (Serial)	Launch site	Payload	Payload mass	Orbit	Customer	Launch outcome
3	August 13, 2025; 00:56	VC4S (V‑003)	Cape Canaveral, SLC‑41	USSF-106 (NTS-3 & TBA)	~1,250 kg (2,760 lb)	GSO	U.S. Space Force	Success
3	Maiden flight of VC4S configuration. First NSSL mission for Vulcan Centaur. Carried Navigation Technology Satellite 3 (NTS-3), an experimental spacecraft to test technologies for next-generation GPS satellites.							

=== 2026 ===
Flight No.	Date / time (UTC)	Configuration (Serial)	Launch site	Payload	Payload mass	Orbit	Customer	Launch outcome
4	February 12, 2026; 09:22	VC4S (V‑005)	Cape Canaveral, SLC‑41	USSF‑87	Unknown	GSO	U.S. Space Force	Success
4	Primary payloads were GSSAP 7 and 8, accompanied by secondary payloads aboard Northrop Grumman's ESPAStar platform. A GEM-63XL solid rocket booster experienced an anomaly, but the core stage compensated for the loss of thrust and the vehicle achieved its planned orbit. Following the anomaly, the U.S. Space Force suspended Vulcan launches for NSSL missions pending investigation and corrective action. Flight was the first to use ULA's Offline Vertical Integration (OVI) process and, at nearly ten hours from liftoff to mission completion, was the longest in ULA's history.							
5	November 15, 2026; 17:40	VC6L (V‑012)	Cape Canaveral, SLC‑41	LeoSat × 40 (LV‑01)	22,700 kg (50,000 lb)	LEO	Amazon Leo	Failure
5	First of 38 planned Vulcan launches for Amazon Leo, formerly Project Kuiper. Maiden flight of the VC6L configuration, first flight with six solid rocket boosters, first flight of the longer 70ft payload fairing, first flight of the shortened LEO-optimized Centaur V, and first Vulcan assembled in VIF-A. The rocket malfunctioned during flight and failed to deliver the payload to orbit, resulting in ULA's first total mission failure. ULA said its preliminary review indicated that the first stage underperformed because of an inadequate fuel supply.							

== Future launches ==
Future launches are listed chronologically when firm plans are in place. The order of the later launches is much less certain. Launches are expected to take place "no earlier than" (NET) the listed date.

=== 2026 ===
Date / time (UTC)	Configuration	Launch site	Payload	Orbit	Customer
2026	VC6L	Cape Canaveral, SLC‑41	LeoSat × 40 (LV-02)	LEO	Amazon Leo
2026	Second of 38 Vulcan Centaur launches for Amazon Leo.				
2026	VC6L	Cape Canaveral, SLC‑41	LeoSat × 40 (LV-03)	LEO	Amazon Leo
2026	Third of 38 Vulcan Centaur launches for Amazon Leo.				

=== 2027 ===
Date / time (UTC)	Configuration	Launch site	Payload	Orbit	Customer
2027	TBA	Cape Canaveral, SLC‑41	USSF-50 (NG-OPIR-GEO 2)	GEO	U.S. Space Force
2027	Next Generation Overhead Persistent Infrared satellite.				
2027	TBA	Cape Canaveral, SLC‑41	NROL-88	TBA	NRO
2027	Classified NRO Mission.				
2027	TBA	Cape Canaveral, SLC‑41	USSF-57 (NG-OPIR-GEO 1)	GEO	U.S. Space Force
2027	Next Generation Overhead Persistent Infrared satellite.				
2027	VC2S	Vandenberg, SLC‑3E	SDA T1TR-B	LEO	SDA
2027	Tranche 1 Tracking Layer B missile tracking satellites. First Vulcan launch from Vandenberg.				
2027	VC4	Cape Canaveral, SLC‑41	NROL-64	TBA	NRO
2027	First NRO launch on Vulcan. Possibly SunRISE 1-6 as secondary.				
2027	VC2S	Vandenberg, SLC‑3E	SDA T1TR-D	LEO	SDA
2027	Tranche 1 Tracking Layer D missile tracking satellites.				
2027	TBA	Vandenberg, SLC‑3E	SDA T2TL-B	LEO	SDA
2027	Tranche 2 Transport Layer B missile tracking satellites.				
2027	VC4L	Cape Canaveral, SLC‑41	SSC Demo-1 (Dream Chaser Tenacity)	LEO (ISS)	NASA (CRS)
2027	First flight of Dream Chaser. Maiden flight of the Vulcan Centaur VC4L configuration.				
2027	TBA	Cape Canaveral, SLC‑41	USSF-43 (LDPE-4 & TBA)	TBA	U.S. Space Force
2027	Rapid On-orbit Space Technology Evaluation Ring (ROOSTER)-4				
2027	VC2L	Cape Canaveral, SLC‑41	WGS-11 (PTS-P1)	GEO	U.S. Space Force
2027	Military communications satellite. Maiden flight of the Vulcan Centaur VC2L configuration. Protected Tactical Satcom prototype payload. The PTS payload will fly on dedicated Northrop Grumman built ESPAStar-HP satellite bus.				
2027	VC4S	Cape Canaveral, SLC‑41	USSF-112	TBA	U.S. Space Force
2027	Classified payload.				
2027	TBA	Cape Canaveral, SLC‑41	USSF-23	TBA	U.S. Space Force
2027	Classified payload.				
2027	TBA	Cape Canaveral, SLC‑41	USSF-16	TBA	U.S. Space Force
2027	Classified payload.				
2027	TBA	Vandenberg, SLC‑3E	USSF-114	TBA	U.S. Space Force
2027	Classified payload.				
2027	TBA	Vandenberg, SLC‑3E	NROL-83	TBA	NRO
2027	Classified NRO payload. First announced Vulcan Centaur launch from Vandenberg.				
2027	TBA	Cape Canaveral, SLC‑41	Silentbarker 2A, 2B, 2C (NROL-118)	GEO	U.S. Space Force (NRO)
2027	Classified USSF & NRO partnered program.				
2027	TBA	Cape Canaveral, SLC‑41	NROL-56	TBA	NRO
2027	Classified NRO payload.				
2027	TBA	Vandenberg, SLC‑3E	NROL-73	TBA	NRO
2027	Classified NRO payload.				
2027	TBA	Vandenberg, SLC‑3E	NROL-100	TBA	NRO
2027	Classified NRO payload.				
2027	TBA	Cape Canaveral, SLC‑41	NROL-109	TBA	NRO
2027	Classified NRO payload.				
2027	TBA	Cape Canaveral, SLC‑41	STP-5	LEO	U.S. Space Force
2027	Two satellites for Department of Defense Strategic Capabilities Office				
2027	TBA	Cape Canaveral, SLC‑41	Missile Track Custody 1 (USSF-95)	MEO	U.S. Space Force
2027	First launch of Missile Track Custody satellites.				

=== 2028 and beyond ===
Date / time (UTC)	Configuration	Launch site	Payload	Orbit	Customer
Q3 2028	TBA	Cape Canaveral, SLC‑41	USSF-70	TBA	U.S. Space Force
Q3 2028	Swapped with Falcon 9 due to GPS IIII SV10 switch under National Security Space Launch.				
2028	TBA	Cape Canaveral, SLC‑41	GPS IIIF-1	MEO	U.S. Space Force
2028	First GPS Block IIIF navigation satellite.				
2029	TBA	Cape Canaveral, SLC‑41	GPS IIIF-2	MEO	U.S. Space Force
2029	Also designated USSF-49 under NSSL.				
2030	TBA	Cape Canaveral, SLC‑41	GPS IIIF-3	MEO	U.S. Space Force
2030	Also designated USSF-15 under NSSL.				
2030	TBA	Cape Canaveral, SLC‑41	GPS IIIF-4	MEO	U.S. Space Force
2030	Also designated USSF-88 under NSSL.				

== See also ==
- List of Atlas launches (2020–2029)
- List of Thor and Delta launches (2020–2024)
- List of USA satellites
- List of NRO launches
