= List of Atlas launches (2020–2029) =

Launches of American rocket family

== Notable missions ==
=== Solar Orbiter ===
The Solar Orbiter (SolO) is a Sun-observing probe developed by the European Space Agency (ESA) with a NASA contribution. Solar Orbiter, designed to obtain detailed measurements of the inner heliosphere and the nascent solar wind, also performs close observations of the polar regions of the Sun which is difficult to do from Earth. These observations are important in investigating how the Sun creates and controls its heliosphere.

=== Mars 2020 ===
Mars 2020 is a NASA mission that includes the rover Perseverance, the now-grounded small robotic helicopter Ingenuity, and associated delivery systems, as part of the Mars Exploration Program. Mars 2020 was launched on an Atlas V rocket at 11:50:01 UTC on July 30, 2020, and landed in the Martian crater Jezero on February 18, 2021, with confirmation received at 20:55 UTC. On March 5, 2021, NASA named the landing site Octavia E. Butler Landing. As of 15 November 2026, Perseverance has been on Mars for 2040 sols (2096 total days; 5 years, 270 days). Ingenuity operated on Mars for 1042 sols (1071 total days; 2 years, 341 days) before sustaining serious damage to its rotor blades, possibly all four, causing NASA to retire the craft on January 25, 2024.

=== Landsat 9 ===
Landsat 9 is an Earth observation satellite launched on 27 September 2021 from Space Launch Complex-3E at Vandenberg Space Force Base on an Atlas V 401 launch vehicle. NASA is in charge of building, launching, and testing the satellite, while the United States Geological Survey (USGS) operates the satellite, and manages and distributes the data archive. It is the ninth satellite developed in the Landsat program, and eighth to reach orbit (Landsat 6 failed to reach orbit). The Critical Design Review (CDR) was completed by NASA in April 2018, and Northrop Grumman Innovation Systems (NGIS) was given the go-ahead to manufacture the satellite.

=== Lucy ===
Lucy is a NASA space probe on a twelve-year journey to eight different asteroids. It is slated to visit two main belt asteroids as well as six Jupiter trojans – asteroids that share Jupiter's orbit around the Sun, orbiting either ahead of or behind the planet. All target encounters will be flyby encounters.

=== Boeing Crew Flight Test ===
Boeing Crew Flight Test (Boe-CFT) was the first crewed mission of the Boeing Starliner capsule. Launched on June 5, 2024, the mission flew a crew of two NASA astronauts, Barry E. Wilmore and Sunita Williams, from Cape Canaveral Space Force Station to the International Space Station. The mission was meant to last eight days, ending on June 14 with a landing in the American Southwest. However, Starliner's thrusters malfunctioned as it approached the ISS. After more than two months of investigation, NASA decided it was too risky to return Wilmore and Williams to Earth aboard Starliner. Instead, the Boeing spacecraft returned uncrewed on September 7, 2024, and successfully landed at the White Sands Space Harbor in New Mexico, although it experienced a thruster failure that left the capsule without fault tolerance. The astronauts rode down aboard SpaceX Crew-9 on March 18, 2025.

== Launch statistics ==
=== Rocket configurations ===
- Atlas V 401
- Atlas V 411
- Atlas V 421
- Atlas V 431
- Atlas V 501
- Atlas V 511
- Atlas V 531
- Atlas V 541
- Atlas V 551
- Atlas V N22

=== Launch sites ===
- Cape Canaveral, SLC‑41
- Vandenberg, SLC‑3E

=== Launch outcomes ===
- Failure
- Partial failure
- Success
- Planned

== Launch history ==
=== 2020 ===
Flight No.	Date / time (UTC)	Rocket, Configuration	Launch site	Payload	Payload mass	Orbit	Customer	Launch outcome
AV‑087	February 10, 2020; 04:03	Atlas V 411	Cape Canaveral, SLC-41	Solar Orbiter	1,800 kg (4,000 lb)	Heliocentric	ESA	Success
AV‑087	ESA/NASA Heliophysics probe							
AV‑086	March 26, 2020; 20:18	Atlas V 551	Cape Canaveral, SLC-41	USA-298 (AEHF-6, TDO-2)	6,168 kg (13,598 lb)	GTO	US Space Force	Success
AV‑086	Sixth and final Advanced Extremely High Frequency military communications satellite							
AV‑081	May 17, 2020; 13:14	Atlas V 501	Cape Canaveral, SLC-41	USA-299 (X-37B OTV-6, FalconSat-8)	~5,000 kg (11,000 lb)	LEO	United States Space Force	Success
AV‑081	Sixth flight of the X-37B military spaceplane; first with a service module, plus FalconSat-8 satellite.							
AV‑088	July 30, 2020; 11:50	Atlas V 541	Cape Canaveral, SLC-41	Mars 2020 (inc Perseverance, Ingenuity)	3,839 kg (8,464 lb)	Heliocentric	NASA	Success
AV‑088	Spacecraft for NASA's Mars 2020 mission.							
AV‑090	November 13, 2020; 22:32	Atlas V 531	Cape Canaveral, SLC-41	USA-310 (NROL-101)	Unknown	MEO (Note: 11,033 km × 11,068 km (6,856 mi × 6,877 mi; 5,957 nmi × 5,976 nmi) x 58.5°)	NRO	Success
AV‑090	Unknown National Reconnaissance Office payload, first Atlas launch with updated GEM-63 strap-on solid rocket boosters. Originally thought to be a Molniya mission. Later sightings instead pointed towards a MEO mission. Likely an experimental payload.							

=== 2021 ===
Flight No.	Date / time (UTC)	Rocket, Configuration	Launch site	Payload	Payload mass	Orbit	Customer	Launch outcome
AV‑091	May 18, 2021; 17:37	Atlas V 421	Cape Canaveral, SLC-41	USA 315 (SBIRS GEO-5)	~4,500 kg (9,900 lb)	GTO	United States Space Force	Success
AV‑091	Fifth Space-Based Infrared System Geostationary satellite.							
AV‑092	September 27, 2021; 18:12	Atlas V 401	Vandenberg, SLC-3E	Landsat 9 L9EFS	2,711 kg (5,977 lb) +510 kg	SSO	NASA / USGS	Success
AV‑092	Eighth Landsat geological survey satellite in orbit. Additionally launched the U.S. Space Force (USSF) Landsat-9 ESPA Flight System (L9EFS) which delivered several additional cubesats to orbit as a result of a cooperative engagement between NASA and U.S. Space Force to increase access to space for small satellite systems.							
AV‑096	October 16, 2021; 09:34	Atlas V 401	Cape Canaveral, SLC-41	Lucy	1,550 kg (3,420 lb)	Heliocentric	NASA	Success
AV‑096	NASA mission to explore six Jupiter trojan asteroids. Final interplanetary mission launched by the Atlas rocket family.							
AV‑093	December 7, 2021; 10:19	Atlas V 551	Cape Canaveral, SLC-41	STP-3 (STPSat-6 & LDPE-1)	Unknown	GEO	United States Space Force	Success
AV‑093	The primary payload is the STPSat-6 satellite carrying SABRS-3, NASA's LCRD, and seven Defense Department Space Experiments Review Board space weather and situational awareness payloads. Alongside STPSat-6 was an integrated propulsive EELV Secondary Payload Adapter (IP-ESPA) holding up to six payloads. The STP-3 mission also debuted three engineering features designed to reduce risk and accumulate flight experience before use on Vulcan Centaur: an Out-of-Autoclave (OoA) payload fairings, an in-flight power system and GPS enhanced navigation. The launch was delayed multiple times, first in January due to the launch readiness of the STPSat-6 satellite, in June due to some ringing of the RL10C's new carbon nozzle extension observed during the SBIRS GEO-5 mission, and in November due to a space vehicle processing issue.							

=== 2022 ===
Flight No.	Date / time (UTC)	Rocket, Configuration	Launch site	Payload	Payload mass (kg)	Orbit	Customer	Launch outcome
AV‑084	January 21, 2022; 19:00	Atlas V 511	Cape Canaveral, SLC-41	USSF-8 (GSSAP 5 & 6)	Unknown	GEO	United States Space Force	Success
AV‑084	USSF-8 launched two identical Geosynchronous Space Situational Awareness satellites, GSSAP-5 and 6, directly to a geosynchronous orbit. First and only flight of 511 configuration.							
AV‑095	March 1, 2022; 21:38	Atlas V 541	Cape Canaveral, SLC-41	GOES-T	5,200 kg (11,500 lb)	GTO	NOAA	Success
AV‑095	GOES meteorological satellite. GOES-T, which will be renamed GOES-18 once it reaches geostationary orbit, will replace GOES-17 as NOAA's operational GOES West satellite.							
AV‑082	May 19, 2022; 22:54	Atlas V N22	Cape Canaveral, SLC-41	Boeing Orbital Flight Test 2 (Boeing Starliner S2.1)	~13,000 kg (29,000 lb)	LEO (ISS)	Boeing	Success
AV‑082	Atlas V releases the Starliner spacecraft on a transatmospheric orbit with apogee of 181 km and a perigee of 72 km. Starliner used its own engines to enter low Earth orbit and make its way to the International Space Station.							
AV‑094	July 1, 2022; 23:15	Atlas V 541	Cape Canaveral, SLC-41	USSF-12 (WFOV & USSF-12 Ring)	Unknown	GEO	United States Space Force	Success
AV‑094	Rideshare mission consisting of 2 spacecraft. The forward payload was the Wide-field of View (WFOV) testbed that informs the Next Gen Overhead Persistent Infrared program (NG-OPIR) which will replace the Space-Based Infrared System (SBIRS). The aft payload was a propulsive ESPA named the USSF-12 Ring, which is a mission for the Department of Defense. 100th flight of an RD-180 engine.							
AV‑097	August 4, 2022; 10:29	Atlas V 421	Cape Canaveral, SLC-41	USA-336 (SBIRS GEO-6)	~4,500 kg (9,900 lb)	GTO	United States Space Force	Success
AV‑097	Sixth and final Space-Based Infrared System Geostationary satellite. Final flight of an Atlas V with 4-meter fairing from Cape Canaveral.							
AV‑099	October 4, 2022; 21:36	Atlas V 531	Cape Canaveral, SLC-41	SES-20 & SES-21	~3,300 kg (7,300 lb)	GEO	SES	Success
AV‑099	Boeing built communication satellites. Satellites launched on a dual stack configuration. SES-20 will be located as an in-orbit spare at 103° West, while SES-21 will be operated at 131° West.							
AV‑098	November 10, 2022; 09:49	Atlas V 401	Vandenberg, SLC-3E	JPSS-2 (NOAA-21) & LOFTID	4,154 kg (9,158 lb)	SSO	NOAA	Success
AV‑098	Second JPSS weather satellite; joint NASA/ULA inflatable heat shield demonstrator (LOFTID). Last launch of an Atlas V rocket from Vandenberg Space Force Base. Final flight of an Atlas V with a 4-meter fairing. 100th use of Single Engine Centaur.							

=== 2023 ===
Flight No.	Date / time (UTC)	Rocket, Configuration	Launch site	Payload	Payload mass	Orbit	Customer	Launch outcome
AV‑102	September 10, 2023; 12:47	Atlas V 551	Cape Canaveral, SLC-41	USA-346, USA-347 & USA-348 (NROL-107, Silentbarker)	Unknown	GEO	NRO	Success
AV‑102	Unknown NRO payload. Final NRO launch on an Atlas V.							
AV‑104	October 6, 2023; 18:06	Atlas V 501	Cape Canaveral, SLC-41	KuiperSat-1 & KuiperSat-2	Unknown	LEO	Amazon (Kuiper Systems)	Success
AV‑104	Project Kuiper Protoflight mission, carrying two demonstrator satellites. Final flight of Atlas V 501.							

=== 2024 ===
Flight No.	Date / time (UTC)	Rocket, Configuration	Launch site	Payload	Payload mass	Orbit	Customer	Launch outcome
AV‑085	June 5, 2024; 14:52	Atlas V N22	Cape Canaveral, SLC-41	Boeing Crew Flight Test (Boeing Starliner S3.2 Calypso)	~13,000 kg (29,000 lb)	LEO (ISS)	NASA	Success
AV‑085	Crewed flight test of the Starliner spacecraft to the ISS, with Sunita Williams and Barry E. Wilmore. First crewed launch of Atlas V. 100th Atlas V launch.							
AV‑101	July 30, 2024; 10:45	Atlas V 551	Cape Canaveral, SLC-41	USSF-51	Unknown	GEO	United States Space Force	Success
AV‑101	First launch for United Launch Alliance under National Security Space Launch. Launch vehicle transferred from Vulcan Centaur to Atlas V. Final USSF launch on an Atlas V.							

=== 2025 ===
Flight No.	Date / time (UTC)	Rocket, Configuration	Launch site	Payload	Payload mass	Orbit	Customer	Launch outcome
AV‑107	April 28, 2025; 23:01	Atlas V 551	Cape Canaveral, SLC-41	KuiperSat × 27 (KA‑01)	15,400 kg (34,000 lb)	LEO	Amazon (Kuiper Systems)	Success
AV‑107	Launch of 27 satellites for internet constellation. Heaviest payload ever launched by an Atlas V.							
AV‑105	June 23, 2025; 10:54	Atlas V 551	Cape Canaveral, SLC-41	KuiperSat × 27 (KA‑02)	15,400 kg (34,000 lb)	LEO	Amazon (Kuiper Systems)	Success
AV‑105	Launch of 27 satellites for internet constellation.							
AV‑108	September 25, 2025; 12:09	Atlas V 551	Cape Canaveral, SLC-41	KuiperSat × 27 (KA‑03)	15,400 kg (34,000 lb)	LEO	Amazon (Kuiper Systems)	Success
AV‑108	Launch of 27 satellites for internet constellation.							
AV‑100	November 14, 2025; 03:04	Atlas V 551	Cape Canaveral, SLC-41	ViaSat-3 F2	6,400 kg (14,100 lb)	GTO	ViaSat	Success
AV‑100	First commercial contract directly signed with ULA. Communications satellite. Final Atlas launch to travel beyond low Earth orbit.							
AV‑111	December 16, 2025; 08:28	Atlas V 551	Cape Canaveral, SLC-41	LeoSat × 27 (LA‑04)	15,400 kg (34,000 lb)	LEO	Amazon (Amazon Leo)	Success
AV‑111	Launch of 27 satellites for internet constellation. First launch under the Amazon Leo name.							

=== 2026 ===
Flight No.	Date / time (UTC)	Rocket, Configuration	Launch site	Payload	Payload mass	Orbit	Customer	Launch outcome
AV‑109	April 4, 2026; 05:46	Atlas V 551	Cape Canaveral, SLC-41	LeoSat × 29 (LA‑05)	16,800 kg (37,000 lb)	LEO	Amazon (Amazon Leo)	Success
AV‑109	Launch of 29 satellites for internet constellation. Heaviest payload ever launched by an Atlas V.							
AV‑112	April 28, 2026; 00:53	Atlas V 551	Cape Canaveral, SLC-41	LeoSat × 29 (LA‑06)	16,800 kg (37,000 lb)	LEO	Amazon (Amazon Leo)	Success
AV‑112	Launch of 29 satellites for internet constellation. 500th launch made from the Integrate-Transfer-Launch Complex.							
AV‑113	May 29, 2026; 23:53	Atlas V 551	Cape Canaveral, SLC-41	LeoSat × 29 (LA‑07)	16,800 kg (37,000 lb)	LEO	Amazon (Amazon Leo)	Success
AV‑113	Launch of 29 satellites for internet constellation.							
AV‑114	July 2, 2026; 04:30	Atlas V 551	Cape Canaveral, SLC-41	LeoSat × 29 (LA‑08)	16,800 kg (37,000 lb)	LEO	Amazon (Amazon Leo)	Success
AV‑114	Final flight of Atlas V: in the 551 configuration; with a 5-meter fairing; with Single Engine Centaur III upper stage; and with GEM-63 strap-on solid rocket boosters. Last of nine Amazon Leo launches on Atlas V.							

== Future launches ==
In August 2021, ULA announced that Atlas V would be retired, and all 29 remaining launches had been sold. As of July 2026, six rockets remain, all of which are slated to launch Starliner missions.

Date / Time (UTC)	Rocket, Configuration	Launch site	Payload	Orbit	Customer
NET January 14, 2027	Atlas V N22	Cape Canaveral, SLC-41	Boeing Starliner-1 (uncrewed)	LEO (ISS)	Boeing
2028	Atlas V N22	Cape Canaveral, SLC-41	Boeing Starliner-2	LEO (ISS)	Boeing
TBD	Atlas V N22	Cape Canaveral, SLC-41	Boeing Starliner-3	LEO (ISS)	Boeing
TBD	Atlas V N22	Cape Canaveral, SLC-41	Boeing Starliner-4	LEO (ISS)	Boeing
TBD	NASA placed firm orders for one uncrewed flight followed by three crewed flights, with options for an additional two flights. However it is unclear if it will be possible to operate that many missions before the scheduled retirement of the ISS in 2030. NASA subsequently announced that further investigation is needed prior to Starliner-1.				
TBD	Atlas V N22	Cape Canaveral, SLC-41	Boeing Starliner-5	LEO	Boeing
TBD	Atlas V N22	Cape Canaveral, SLC-41	Boeing Starliner-6	LEO	Boeing
TBD	NASA and Boeing had stated their intention to use all of their remaining purchased flights of Starliner on Atlas V, however it is unclear as to whether these flights will be used for missions to the ISS or potentially a commercial space station. NASA and Boeing also announced that further missions of Starliner beyond Starliner-6 launching on Vulcan Centaur would occur due to the waning of the Dragon program and the need for commercial crew access to LEO after the decommissioning of the ISS.				

== See also ==
- List of Thor and Delta launches (2020–2024)
- List of Vulcan launches
