= List of Thor and Delta launches (2020–2024) =

The final half-decade of launches in the Thor/Delta family consisted of one Delta IV Heavy each year from 2020 through 2024. This followed the retirement of Delta II in 2018 and single-stick (non-Heavy) variants of the Delta IV in 2019. With the start of 2024, Vulcan Centaur took its first flight in time to maintain continuity of ULA's service in the heavy-lift launch vehicle market before the Delta IV Heavy program came to an end three months later on April 9, 2024.

== Launch statistics ==
=== Launch sites ===
- Cape Canaveral SLC-37B
- Vandenberg SLC-6

== Launch history ==
=== 2020 ===
Flight No.	Date / time (UTC)	Rocket, Configuration	Launch site	Payload	Payload mass	Orbit	Customer	Launch outcome
385	11 December 2020; 01:09	Delta IV Heavy	CCSFS, SLC-37B	USA-311 (NROL-44)	Classified	GSO	US NRO	Success
385	Reconnaissance satellite, likely an Orion satellite. Launch attempts on 29 August and 30 September were aborted due to problems with the Ground Service Equipment (GSE). The rocket finally lifted off on 11 December.							
=== 2021 ===
Flight No.	Date / time (UTC)	Rocket, Configuration	Launch site	Payload	Payload mass	Orbit	Customer	Launch outcome
386	26 April 2021; 20:47	Delta IV Heavy	VAFB, SLC-6	USA-314 (NROL-82)	Classified	LEO	US NRO	Success
386	Reconnaissance satellite, likely a KH-11 Kennen satellite.							
=== 2022 ===
Flight No.	Date / time (UTC)	Rocket, Configuration	Launch site	Payload	Payload mass	Orbit	Customer	Launch outcome
387	24 September 2022; 22:25:30	Delta IV Heavy	VAFB, SLC-6	NROL-91	Classified	LEO	US NRO	Success
387	Reconnaissance satellite, likely a KH-11 Kennen satellite. Final Delta flight from Vandenberg.							
=== 2023 ===
Flight No.	Date / time (UTC)	Rocket, Configuration	Launch site	Payload	Payload mass	Orbit	Customer	Launch outcome
388	22 June 2023; 09:18	Delta IV Heavy	CCSFS, SLC-37B	NROL-68	Classified	GEO	US NRO	Success
388	Reconnaissance satellite, likely an Orion satellite.							
=== 2024 ===
Flight No.	Date / time (UTC)	Rocket, Configuration	Launch site	Payload	Payload mass	Orbit	Customer	Launch outcome
389	9 April 2024; 16:53	Delta IV Heavy	CCSFS, SLC-37B	NROL-70	Classified	GEO	US NRO	Success
389	Reconnaissance satellite, likely an Orion satellite. Final flight of the Delta rocket family.							

== See also ==
- List of Atlas launches (2020–2029)
- List of Vulcan launches
- List of USA satellites
- List of NRO launches
