= Geosynchronous Space Situational Awareness Program =

American military space surveillance program

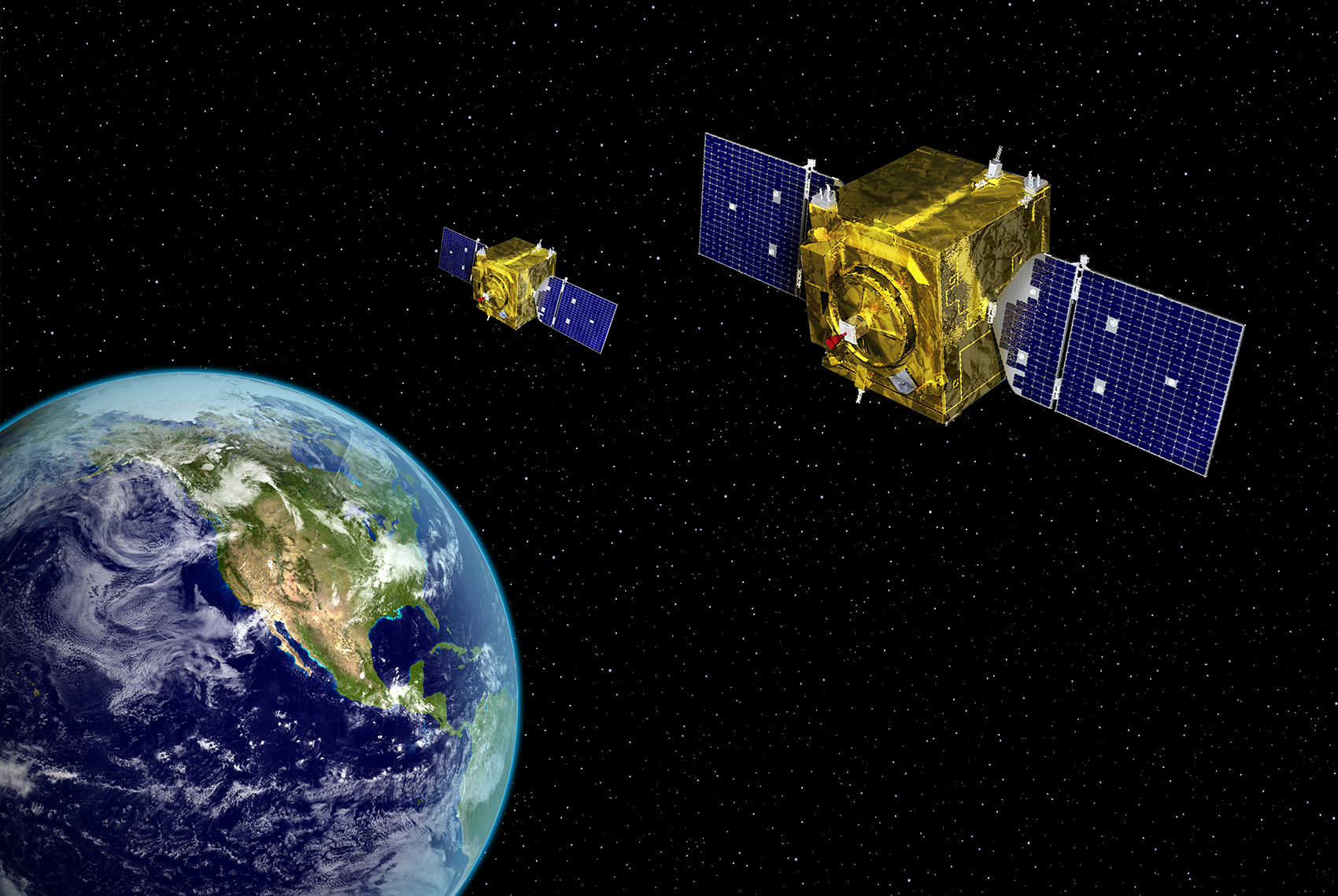
GSSAP artist rendering

Geosynchronous Space Situational Awareness Program (GSSAP) or Hornet is a class of United States spy satellites.

== Missions ==
=== AFSPC-4 (GSSAP-1 & 2) ===
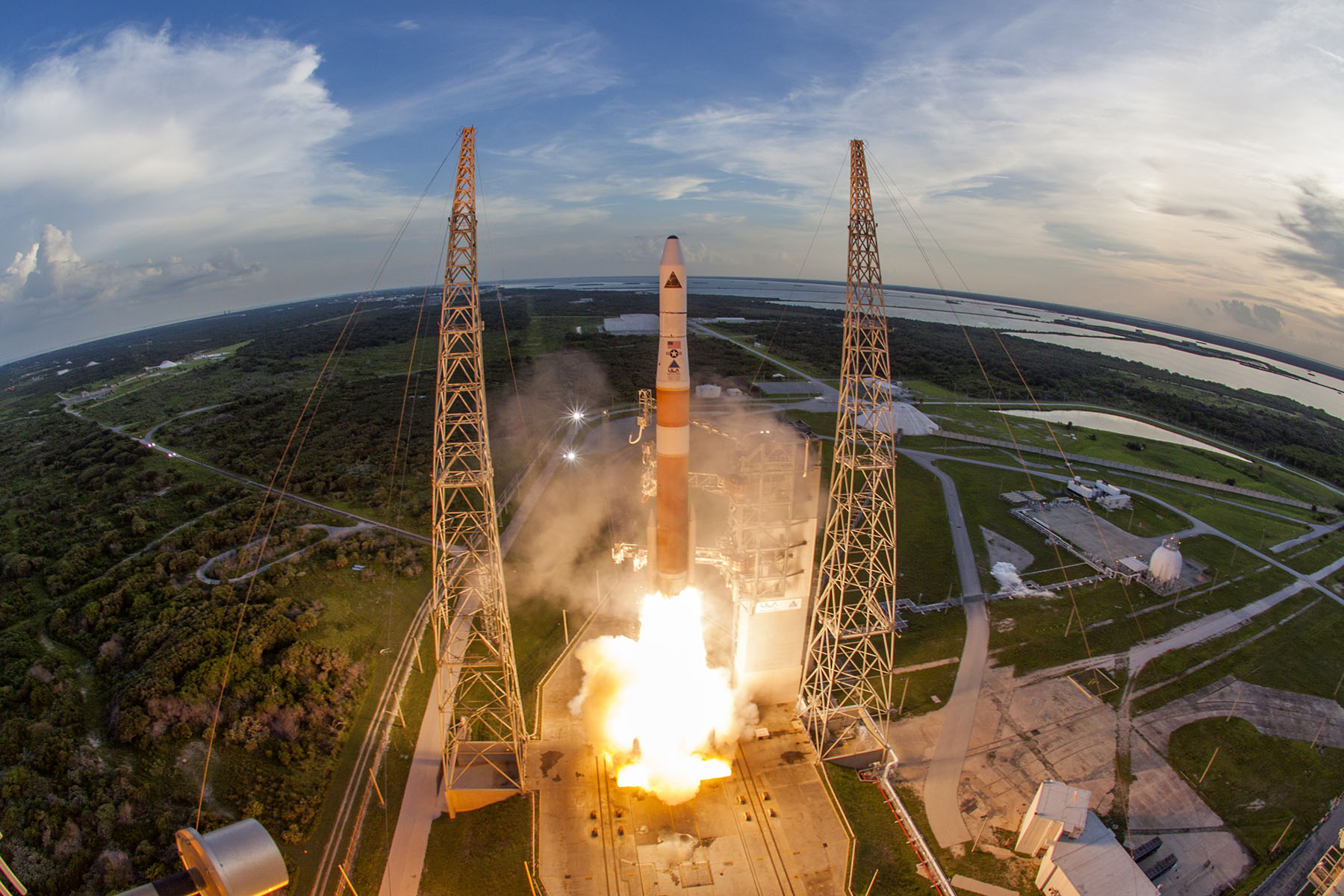
Delta IV 368 launches GSSAP 1 and 2 from Cape Canaveral Air Force Station on 2014

The first two GSSAP spacecraft, GSSAP 1 (USA-253) and GSSAP 2 (USA-254) were launched in 2014. They were built by Orbital Sciences Corporation; their capabilities and development and construction budgets are classified. They operate in "near-geosynchronous orbit", The first launch was scheduled for 23 July 2014 aboard a United Launch Alliance Delta IV launch vehicle. Even during the testing process these satellites were pressed into early service to fulfill critical needs. In August 2023 the Space Systems Command announced the retirement of the GSSAP-2 satellite, the first of the constellation to be decommissioned, and its subsequent transfer into a graveyard orbit.

=== AFSPC-6 (GSSAP-3 & 4) ===
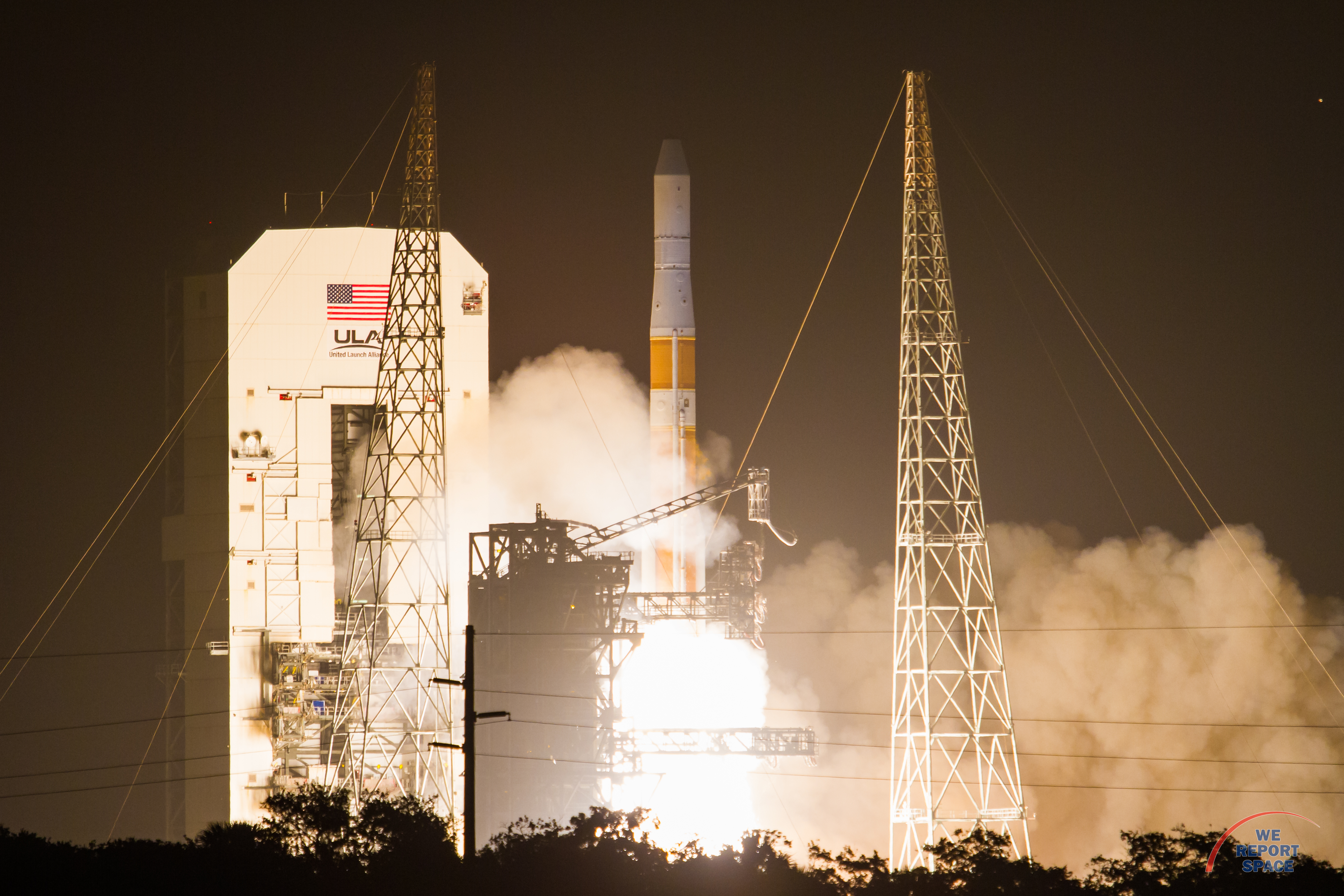
Lift-off of GSSAP 3 and 4 on 19 August 2016 atop Delta IV 375 from Cape Canaveral Air Force Station

GSSAP 3 (USA-270) and 4 (USA-271) satellites were launched on 19 August 2016. On 12 September 2017, both were declared operational. USA-270 approached two Chinese satellites in GEO to examine them more closely. In 2023, Chinese researchers reported having observed 13 other instances where US satellites approached Chinese ones.

=== USSF-8 (GSSAP-5 & 6) ===
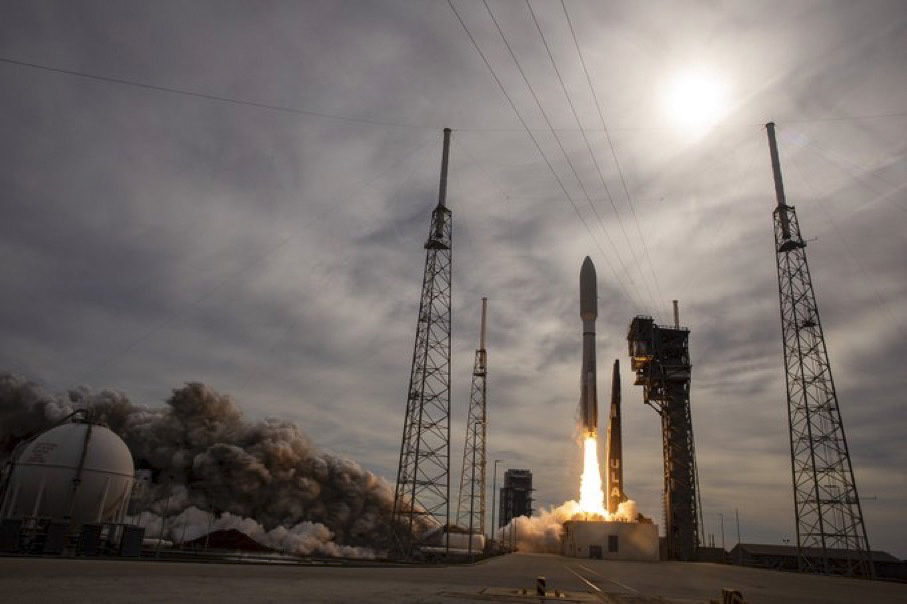
Atlas V AV-084 lifts off from Cape Canaveral Space Force Station, Florida, 21 January 2022 with GSSAP-5 and GSSAP-6.

Two more satellites (GSSAP-5 and GSSAP-6) have been successfully launched on 21 January 2022 by a Atlas V launch vehicle.

=== USSF-87 (GSSAP-7 & 8) ===
In August 2023 the Space Systems Command revealed that two more satellites have been ordered to Northrop Grumman to keep up with the demand for GSSAP assets. The launches of the new satellites were planned for 2024 and 2027 respectively, with the spacecraft being the first of the constellation not to be launched in pairs. GSSAP 7 and 8 have been successfully launched on the 12th of February 2026 by a ULA Vulcan VC4S. There was a possible leak from the SRB.

=== Future ===
GSSAP 9 and 10 will follow in 2027.

== Reactions ==
The GSSAP satellites have a limit to the amount of maneuvering they can undertake, due to fuel supply limitations. In 2023 Aviation Week reported that Northrop Grumman had a contract to install hydrazine refueling valves in future satellites, to enable on-orbit refueling.

Chinese astronomers track GSSAP satellite movements, enabling the prediction of their observations. Chinese satellites have been observed changing orbital trajectories to observe GSSAP satellites or to make observation by GSSAP satellites more difficult.

== Satellites ==
Name	NSSDC ID	Launch date	Launcher
GSSAP 1, Hornet 1, USA 253	2022-174A	23 July 2014 23:28	Delta IV 368
GSSAP 2, Hornet 2, USA 254	2022-174B	23 July 2014 23:28	Delta IV 368
GSSAP 3, Hornet 3, USA 270	2016-052A	19 August 2016 04:52	Delta IV 375
GSSAP 4, Hornet 4, USA 271	2016-052B	19 August 2016 04:52	Delta IV 375
GSSAP 5, Hornet 5, USA 324	2022-006A	21 January 2022 19:00	Atlas V AV-084
GSSAP 6, Hornet 6, USA 325	2022-006B	21 January 2022 19:00	Atlas V AV-084
GSSAP 7, Hornet 7, USSF 87	2026-029A	12 February 2026 04:22	Vulcan Centaur VC4S V005
GSSAP 8, Hornet 8, USSF 87	2026-029B	12 February 2026 04:22	Vulcan Centaur VC4S V005
GSSAP 9, Hornet 9		2027	
GSSAP 10, Hornet 10		2027	

== See also ==
- Combined Force Space Component Command
