= GPS Block IIIF =

Future evolution of GPS III satellites

- Manufacturer: Lockheed Martin
- Country of origin: United States
- Operator: United States Space Force
- Applications: Satellite navigation

Specifications
- Bus: SV11-SV12: Lockheed Martin LM2100M, SV13+: Lockheed Martin LM2100 Combat Bus
- Regime: Semi-synchronous MEO
- Design life: 15 years

Production
- Status: In production
- Planned: Up to 22
- On order: 14
- Built: 0
- Maiden launch: 2028 (planned)
- Last launch: 2037 (planned)

Related spacecraft
- Derived from: GPS Block III

GPS Block IIIF, or GPS III Follow On, is the second set of GPS Block III satellites, consisting of up to 22 space vehicles. The United States Air Force began the GPS Block IIIF acquisition effort in 2016. On 14 September 2018, a manufacturing contract with options worth up to $7.2 billion was awarded to Lockheed Martin. The 22 satellites in Block IIIF are projected to start launching in 2027, with launches estimated to last through at least 2037.

== System enhancements ==
Engineering efforts for Block IIIF satellites began upon contract award in 2016—a full 16 years after the government approved entry into the initial modernization efforts for GPS III in 2000. As a result, GPS Block IIIF introduces a number of improvements and novel capabilities compared to all previous GPS satellite blocks.

=== Improvements ===
==== Nuclear detonation detection system ====
Block IIIF satellites host a redesigned U.S. Nuclear Detonation Detection System (USNDS) capability that is both smaller and lighter than previous systems.

The USNDS is a worldwide system of space-based sensors and ground processing equipment designed to detect, identify, locate, characterize, and report nuclear detonations in the Earth's atmosphere and in space.

==== Fully-digital navigation ====
GPS IIIF satellites are the first to feature a 100% digital navigation payload.

The fully-digital navigation payload introduced by Block IIIF (SV11+) produces improved accuracy, better reliability, and stronger signals compared to the 70% digital navigation payload used by GPS Block III (SV01-SV10).

==== Improved satellite bus ====
GPS IIIF-03 and beyond (GPS III SV13+) will incorporate the Lockheed Martin LM2100 Combat Bus, an improvement on the A2100M bus used in GPS III SV01 through SV12. The LM2100 Combat Bus provides improved resilience to cyber attacks, as well as improved spacecraft power, propulsion, and electronics.

=== Novel capabilities ===
==== Energetic charged particle sensor ====
GPS IIIF satellites will be the first GPS satellites to host an Energetic Charged Particle (ECP) sensor payload.

In March 2015, the U.S. Secretary of the Air Force enacted policy mandating all new Air Force satellite programs must include ECP sensors. Aggregating ECP data from multiple satellites allows for enhanced space domain awareness, enabling improved detection of space weather effects as well as differentiation between anomalies induced by hostile activity, the natural environment, or other non-hostile causes.

==== Search and rescue distress beacon detection ====
GPS IIIF will be the first GPS satellite block to have all space vehicles participate in the Cospas-Sarsat system. The Cospas-Sarsat system is an international collection of satellites spanning low-earth, medium-earth, and geostationary orbit satellites which all listen for 406 MHz distress signals generated by beacons on earth. Satellites relay distress signals to ground stations to initiate timely emergency response efforts.

==== Laser retro-reflector array ====
Adding laser retro-reflector arrays (LRAs) to all GPS IIIF Space Vehicles allows GPS monitoring stations on earth equipped with laser rangefinding equipment to determine much more precise 3D locations for every GPS IIIF satellite. This improves the ability of the GPS system to provide more accurate time/position fixes to GPS receivers. Estimates are that as more GPS satellites host LRAs, the location accuracy will improve from one meter achievable today to one centimeter accuracy, an improvement of several orders of magnitude.

==== Unified S-band capability compliance ====
Block IIIF will be compliant with the Unified S-Band (USB) capabilities, allowing for consolidation of radio frequencies used for telemetry, tracking, and commanding of Block IIIF satellites.

==== Regional military protection capability ====
Regional Military Protection (RMP) is an anti-jamming technology for military GPS consumers. RMP involves directing a massively-amplified spot beam which only includes military GPS signals over a small geographic area. US/allied military GPS receivers located within the RMP spot beam's signal footprint are significantly more difficult for adversaries to jam due to the extremely-amplified signal strength in the area.

==== On-orbit servicing ====
GPS IIIF-03 and newer satellites (GPS III SV13+) will incorporate Lockheed-Martin's LM2100 Combat Bus. Satellites based on the Combat Bus are capable of hosting the "Augmentation System Port Interface" (ASPIN), an interface that allows for future on-orbit servicing and upgrade opportunities.

== Launch history ==
The first GPS Block IIIF satellite is planned to launch in Q3 2028. SV numbers are continued from GPS III SVs. SVNs are consistent with previous GPS satellites.

GPS Block IIIF satellites
Satellite	SVN	Launch Date (UTC)	Rocket	Launch site	Status	Remarks
GPS IIIF-1; SV11	84	Q3 2028	Vulcan Centaur VC2S	Cape Canaveral, SLC‑41	Production	Core mate Feb 2025.AFL target Q3 2027.
GPS IIIF-2; SV12 (USSF-49)	85	Q2 2029	Vulcan Centaur VC2S	Cape Canaveral, SLC‑41	Production	
GPS IIIF-3; SV13 (USSF-15)	86		Vulcan Centaur VC4S	Cape Canaveral, SLC‑41	Production	First to use LM2100 Combat Bus. Core mate April 2025
GPS IIIF-4; SV14 (USSF-88)	87		Vulcan Centaur VC4S	Cape Canaveral, SLC‑41	Production	
GPS IIIF-5; SV15	88				Production	
GPS IIIF-6; SV16	89				Production	
GPS IIIF-7; SV17	90				Production	
GPS IIIF-8; SV18	91				Production	
GPS IIIF-9; SV19	92				Production	
GPS IIIF-10; SV20	93				Production	
GPS IIIF-11; SV21	94				Ordered	
GPS IIIF-12; SV22	95				Ordered	
GPS IIIF-13; SV23	96				Ordered	
GPS IIIF‑14; SV24	97				Ordered	

== Navigational signals ==
Note: none of the navigation signals that GPS Block IIIF satellites transmit are new in Block IIIF; all signals were first supported in previous generation (Block I, Block II, or Block III) GPS satellites.

=== Civilian ===
Signal name	Frequency (MHz)	First satellite generation (Year first launched)	Status	Navigation data	No. of satellites	Remarks
L1 C/A	1575.42	Block I (1978; 48 years ago)	Fully operational	Yes	31	Legacy GPS navigation signal
L1C	1575.42	Block III (2018; 8 years ago)	Developmental (marked "unhealthy", no navigation payload)	No	6 (as of April 2024)	Developed as a common civil signal for GPS and Galileo GNSS systems.
L2C	1227.60	Block IIR-M (2005; 21 years ago)	Pre-Operational (marked "Healthy")	Yes	25 (as of April 2024)	Specifically designed to meet commercial needs. Broadcast at a higher effective power level than L1 C/A, improving reception in locations that L1 C/A struggles, such as under heavy trees or inside buildings.
L5	1176.45	Block IIF (2010; 16 years ago)	Pre-Operational (marked "unhealthy")	Yes	18 (as of April 2024)	Designed for safety-of-life applications.

== Design ==
GPS IIIF is an evolution of GPS III, which uses the A2100 bus as its core. The new models use the modernized LM2100 bus along with a fully digital navigation payload from L3Harris, a significant upgrade from the previous 70% digital payload used in GPS III.

An upgraded version known as the LM2100 Combat Bus will be used starting with the third service vehicle. It will enable on-orbit servicing at a later date, which may include hardware upgrades, component replacement, or refuelling.

Medium Earth Orbit Search and Rescue (MEOSAR) payloads are being provided by the Canadian government on behalf of the Canadian Armed Forces. The time it takes to detect and locate a distress signal will be reduced from an hour to five minutes, along with greatly improved accuracy in locating a distress beacon.

Laser Retroreflector Arrays (LRAs) will be built by the United States Naval Research Lab. This is a passive reflector system that improves accuracy and provides better ephemeris data. The National Geospatial-Intelligence Agency (NGA) will fund the integration costs of the LRA.

Other significant enhancements include: unified S-Band (USB) interface compliance, integration of hosted payloads including a redesigned United States Nuclear Detonation (NUDET) Detection System (USNDS) payload, Energetic Charged Particles (ECP) sensor, and Regional Military Protection (RMP) capabilities that provide the ability to deliver high-power regional Military Code (M-Code) signals in specific areas of intended effect.

The U.S. Air Force has identified four "technology insertion points" for GPS Block IIIF. These four points are the only four times during the block's lifecycle where new capabilities will be allowed to be introduced to Block IIIF satellites.

=== Technology Insertion Point 1 (estimated FY2026) ===
- First Space Vehicle: GPS IIIF-01
- Proposed/possible new functionality:
  - On Orbit Reprogrammable Digital Payload
  - High Power Amplifiers (SSPA's)
  - Regional Military Protection (RMP)

=== Technology Insertion Point 2 (estimated FY2028) ===
- First Space Vehicle: GPS IIIF-07
- Proposed/possible new functionality:
  - M-Code Space Service Volume

=== Technology Insertion Point 3 (estimated FY2030) ===
- First Space Vehicle: GPS IIIF-13
- Proposed/possible new functionality:
  - Near Real-Time Commanding
  - Advanced Clocks

=== Technology Insertion Point 4 (estimated FY2033) ===
- First Space Vehicle: GPS IIIF-19
- Proposed/possible new functionality:
  - TBD

== Development ==
=== Space Segment (Satellites) ===
The U.S. Air Force employed a two-phase competitive bid acquisition process for the GPS Block IIIF satellites.

==== Phase One: Production Feasibility Assessment ====
On 5 May 2016, the U.S. Air Force awarded three Phase One Production Readiness Feasibility Assessment contracts for GPS III Space Vehicles (SV's) 11+, one each to Boeing Network and Space Systems, Lockheed Martin Space Systems Company, and Northrop Grumman Aerospace Systems. The phase one contracts were worth up to six million dollars each. During the phase one effort, both Boeing and Northrop Grumman demonstrated working navigation payloads.

==== Phase Two: Satellite Manufacturing ====
On 19 April 2017, the U.S. Air Force Space Command announced the start of the second phase of its acquisition strategy with the publication of a special notice for an "Industry Day" for companies planning on bidding for the contract to manufacture GPS III vehicles 11+. During the Industry Day event, the Air Force shared the tentative acquisition strategy which it will use to evaluate proposals, then solicited feedback from potential bidders.

In July 2017, the Deputy Director of the U.S. Air Force GPS Directorate stated the acquisition strategy for GPS Block IIIF would be to award the manufacturing contracts for all 22 Block IIIF satellites to the same contractor.

In November 2017, the Deputy Director of the U.S. Air Force's GPS Directorate announced the name of the second tranche of GPS III satellites was "GPS Block IIIF".

Also in November 2017, it was announced that development of the fully digital navigation payload for GPS Block IIIF satellites had completed. The Block IIIA program schedule was delayed multiple times due to issues with the navigation payload.

===== Bidding =====
While the Air Force originally expected to publish the formal Request For Proposals (RFP) for GPS Block IIIF production in September 2017, it was not released until 13 February 2018. The RFP was for a firm-fixed price (FFP) contract for a single company to manufacture all 22 space vehicles. All three participants from phase one (Boeing, Lockheed Martin, and Northrop Grumman) were believed to be likely to submit proposals. The government held a pre-proposal conference in El Segundo, California, to be held on 15 March 2018 for potential bidders to ask the Air Force questions about the solicitation. The submission deadline for proposals was 16 April 2018.

The bid status of companies who participated in phase one, in alphabetical order:

- Boeing: declined to submit a proposal
- Lockheed Martin: submitted a proposal
- Northrop: declined to submit a proposal

===== Funding =====
On 14 September 2018, the Air Force awarded a manufacturing contract with options worth up to US$7.2 billion to Lockheed Martin.

GPS Block IIIF Space Segment Funding History
Date	Description	USD (millions)			Percent of Contract Ceiling Funded	Space Vehicles		Remarks
Date	Description	Authorized		Remaining to Contract Ceiling	Percent of Contract Ceiling Funded	Funded (Max of 22)	Average Price Per SV (USD in millions)	Remarks
Date	Description	Incremental	Cumulative	Remaining to Contract Ceiling	Percent of Contract Ceiling Funded	Funded (Max of 22)	Average Price Per SV (USD in millions)	Remarks
September 2018	Development costs, production of SV's 11–12	1300	1300	5900	18%	11–12 (2)	650	Price per satellite includes research & development costs
October 2020	Production of SV's 13–14	511	1811	5389	25%	11–14 (4)	453	
October 2021	Production of SV's 15–17	737	2548	4652	35%	11–17 (7)	364	
December 2022	Production of SV's 18–20	744	3292	3908	46%	11–20 (10)	329	
May 2025	Production of SV's 21–22	510	3802	3398	53%	11–22 (12)	317	
June 2026	Production of SV's 23–24	514	4316	2884	60%	11-24 (14)	308	

=== Control Segment (Ground-Based Command & Control) ===
GPS Block IIIF's ground control system of record will be the same used for GPS Block III, the Next Generation GPS Operational Control System (OCX).

In order to be able to command and control Block IIIF satellites, in April 2021 the U.S. Space Force awarded a $228 million contract to Raytheon Intelligence and Space called OCX Block 3F, which builds on the existing OCX Block 2 system and adds the ability to perform Launch and Checkout of Block IIIF satellites.

OCX Block 3F delivery was expected in July 2025, with operational acceptance expected in late 2027. As of September 2024, the delivery timeline has shifted to February 2026.

Date	Deployment	Space Vehicles						Remarks
Date	Deployment	Command & Control System			Satellites Delivering Navigation Data			Remarks
Date	Deployment	Block II	Block III	Block IIIF	Block II	Block III	Block IIIF	Remarks
December 2025	OCX Block 2	OCX		N/A	Yes		No	Full GPS III functionality achieved, L1C navigational signals begin transmitting
Late 2027	OCX Block 3F	OCX		OCX (limited)	Yes		No	Block IIIF: OCX only able to be used for Launch & Checkout Services (LCS)

== See also ==
- BeiDou Navigation Satellite System
- BeiDou-2 (COMPASS) navigation system
- Galileo (satellite navigation)
- GLONASS
- Quasi-Zenith Satellite System
