= Sun Radio Interferometer Space Experiment =

Orbiting radio telescope

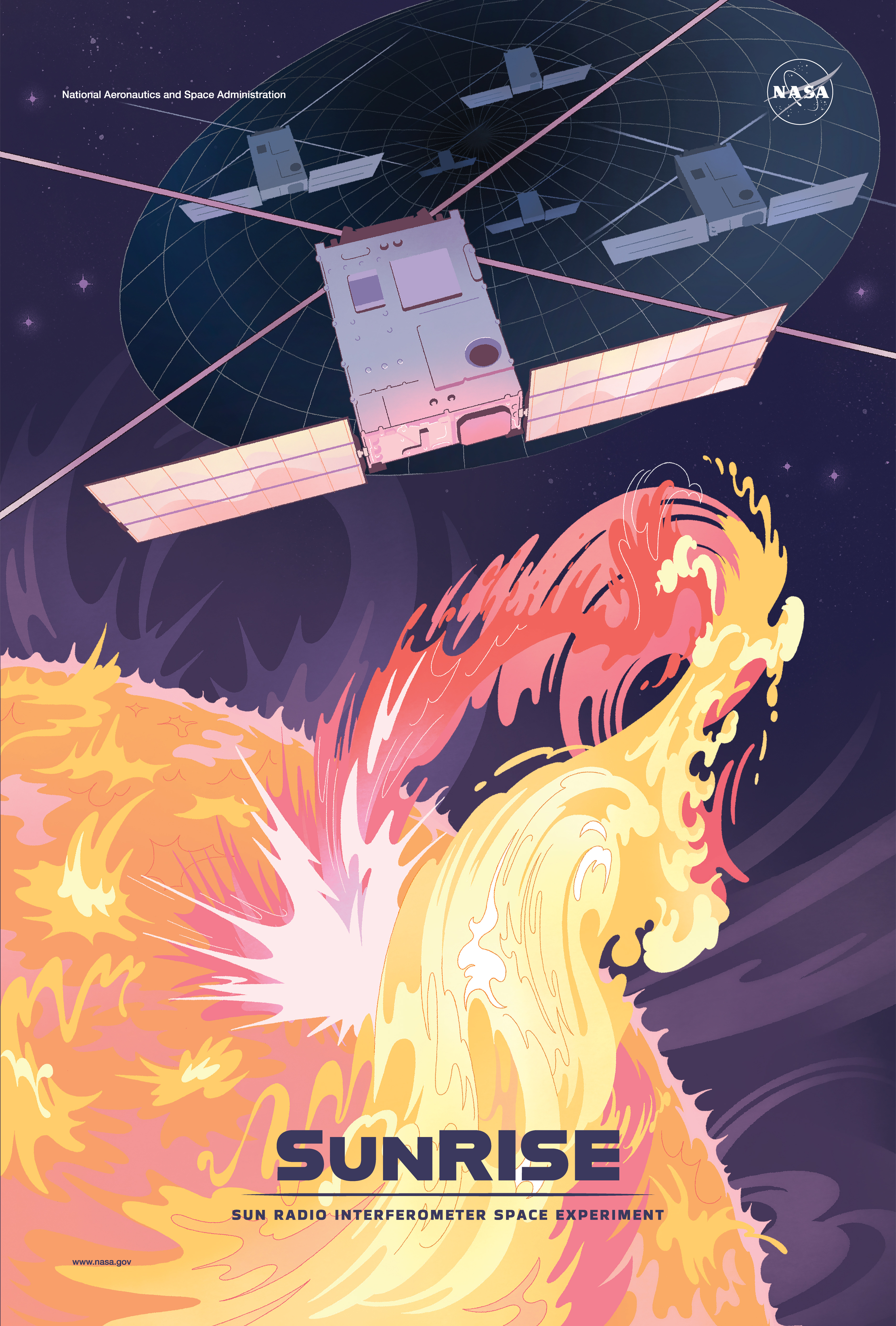
SunRISE mission poster

The Sun Radio Interferometer Space Experiment (SunRISE), is a set of CubeSats designed to study solar activity by acting as an aperture synthesis radio telescope. It is intended to monitor giant solar particle storms. The satellites will occupy a supersynchronous geosynchronous Earth orbit. The participants in the experiment include JPL and the University of Michigan, along with a science team from multiple institutions.

== Status ==
The six satellites have been stored since 2023. Initially planned to launch on Vulcan Centaur, NASA announced a shift to Falcon Heavy in July 2026.
