= Next-Generation Overhead Persistent Infrared =

American ballistic defense program

Next-Generation Overhead Persistent Infrared (NG-OPIR) is a missile warning constellation being developed in the United States as the replacement for its predecessor, the Space-Based Infrared System (SBIRS). It is expected to be a key part of the Golden Dome weapons system.

== Program ==
The Next-Gen OPIR satellites are engineered to detect and track ballistic missile launches, delivering early warnings of potential attacks. Equipped with advanced infrared sensors, these satellites identify the heat signatures of incoming missiles and securely transmit this vital data to ground stations. The Lockheed Martin LM2100 satellite bus is used as the framework for the GEO satellites.

The Space Force was required by the 2026 National Defense Authorization bill to add a payload called the Advanced Payload Suite-Alpha (APS-A) to all OPIR satellites.

The program currently consists of two satellites in geosynchronous orbit and two in polar orbit. First launch is expected in May 2026.

=== Orders ===
In May 2018 the USAF announced sole sourced contracts to Lockheed Martin to develop three NG-OPIR-GEO satellites based on the LM2100 platform and to Northrop Grumman to build two NG-OPIR-Polar satellites.

In January 2021, the first three GEO satellites were ordered from Lockheed Martin for delivery by May 2028. In 2024, production for the third satellite was put on hold indefinitely by the Space Force.

In October 2024, Northrop Grumman was awarded a contract to build and launch the two OPIR-Polar spacecraft. This latest award brings the contract’s total cumulative face value for the company to approximately $4.2 billion.

== Launch history ==
| Satellite | Launch date (UTC) | Rocket | Launch site | Status | Ref. |
|---|---|---|---|---|---|
| USA-??? NGG-1 | May 2026 | Vulcan Centaur | Cape Canaveral, SLC‑41 | Available for launch | |
| USA-??? NGG-2 | 2027 | Vulcan Centaur | Cape Canaveral, SLC‑41 | In production | |
| USA-??? NGG-3 | | | | In production | |
| USA-??? NGP-1 | | | | In production | |
| USA-??? NGP-2 | | | | In production | |

== See also ==
- SBIRS
