= Vulcan Centaur =

United Launch Alliance launch vehicle

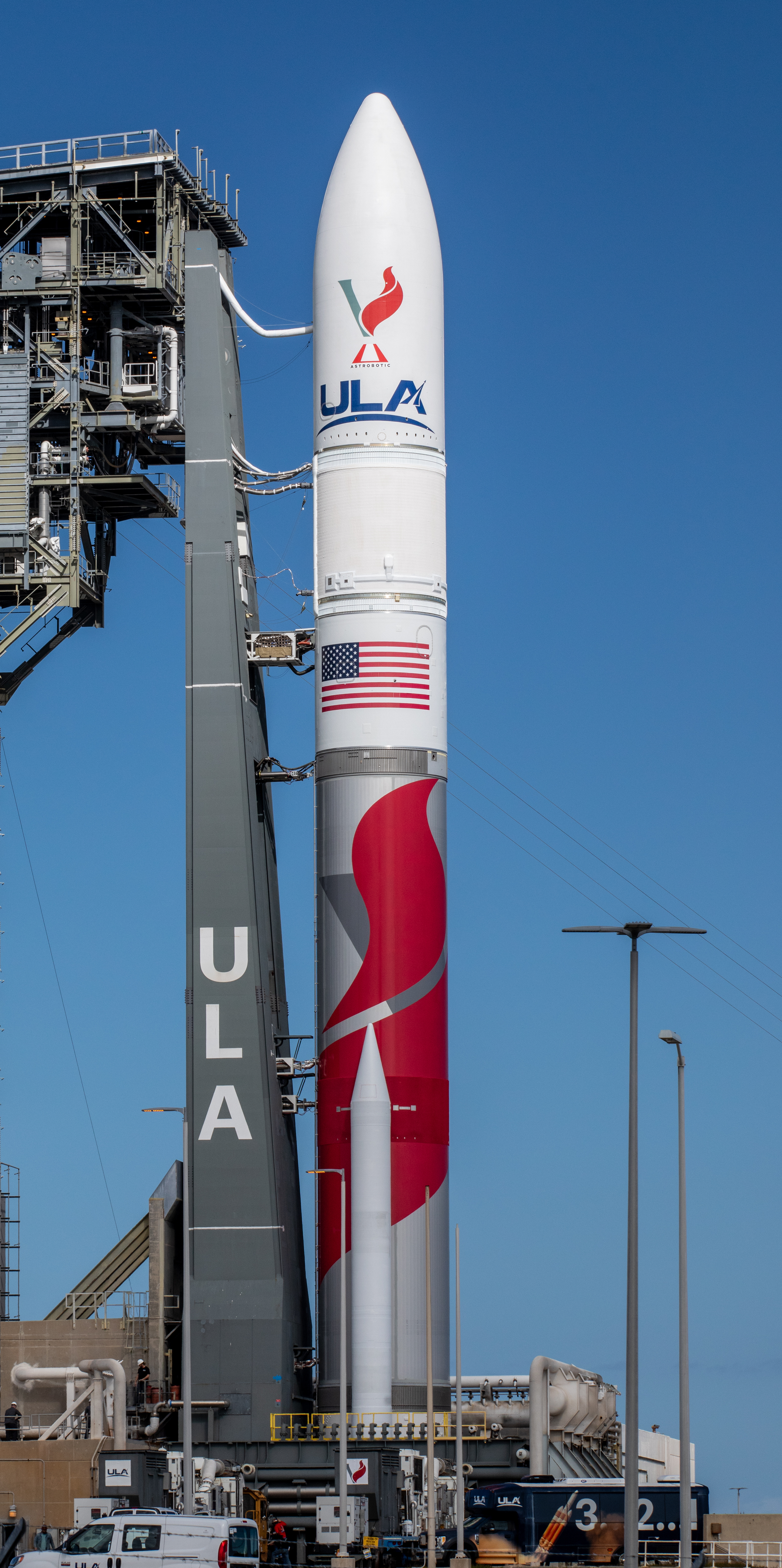
- Vulcan Centaur in VC2S configuration ahead of its maiden flight
- Function: Heavy-lift launch vehicle
- Manufacturer: United Launch Alliance
- Country of origin: United States
- Cost per launch: US$110 million (starting)

Size
- Height: Standard: 61.6 m (202 ft); Long: 67.3 m (221 ft)
- Diameter: 5.4 m (18 ft)
- Mass: 546,700 kg (1,205,300 lb)
- Stages: 2

Capacity

Payload to LEO
- Orbital inclination: 28.7°
- Mass: 27,200 kg (60,000 lb)

Payload to GTO
- Orbital inclination: 27°
- Mass: 15,300 kg (33,700 lb)

Payload to GEO
- Mass: 7,000 kg (15,000 lb)

Payload to TLI
- Mass: 12,100 kg (26,700 lb)

Launch history
- Status: Operational
- Launch sites: Cape Canaveral, SLC‑41; Vandenberg, SLC‑3 (planned)
- Total launches: 5
- Success(es): 4
- Failure: 1
- First flight: January 8, 2024
- Last flight: November 15, 2026 (most recent)

Boosters – GEM-63XL
- No. boosters: 0, 2, 4, or 6
- Height: 21.98 m (865.3 in)
- Diameter: 1.62 m (63.7 in)
- Empty mass: 4,521 kg (9,966 lb)
- Gross mass: 53,030 kg (116,920 lb)
- Propellant mass: 47,853 kg (105,497 lb)
- Maximum thrust: 2,061 kN (463,249 lb_{f}) each
- Total thrust: 12,364 kN (2,779,494 lb_{f}) with 6
- Specific impulse: 280.3 s (2.749 km/s)
- Burn time: 87.3 seconds
- Propellant: AP / HTPB / Al

First stage – Vulcan
- Height: 33.3 m (109 ft)
- Diameter: 5.4 m (18 ft)
- Empty mass: 28,600 kg (63,100 lb)
- Gross mass: 382,000 kg (842,000 lb)
- Powered by: 2 × BE-4
- Maximum thrust: 4,893 kN (1,100,000 lb_{f})
- Specific impulse: SL: 320 s (3.1 km/s); vac: 340 s (3.3 km/s)
- Burn time: 299 seconds
- Propellant: LOX / CH_{4}

Second stage – Centaur V
- Height: CV-L: 10.66 m (35 ft); CV-HE: 12.6 m (41 ft)
- Diameter: 5.4 m (17.7 ft)
- Propellant mass: CV-L: 39,000 kg (85,000 lb); CV-HE: 54,000 kg (120,000 lb)
- Powered by: 2 × RL10C; 2 × RL10E (planned upgrade)
- Maximum thrust: RL10C: 203.6 kN (45,780 lb_{f}); RL10E: 214.6 kN (48,240 lb_{f})
- Specific impulse: RL10C: 453.8 s (4.450 km/s); RL10E: 460.9 s (4.520 km/s)
- Burn time: CV-HE: 1,077 seconds
- Propellant: LOX / LH_{2}

Vulcan Centaur is a heavy-lift launch vehicle (Note: Vulcan Centaur meets the heavy-lift capability of 20,000 kg to low Earth orbit when launching with certain booster configurations.) developed and operated by United Launch Alliance (ULA). It is a two-stage-to-orbit rocket consisting of the Vulcan first stage and the Centaur V second stage. Designed to replace ULA's Atlas V and Delta IV launch vehicles, the Vulcan Centaur is principally designed to meet the needs of the National Security Space Launch (NSSL) program, which supports U.S. intelligence agencies and the Defense Department, but ULA believes it will also be able to price missions low enough to attract commercial launches.

ULA began development of the new launch vehicle in 2014, primarily to compete with SpaceX’s Falcon 9 and to comply with a Congressional mandate to phase out the use of the Russian-made RD-180 engine that powered the Atlas V. The first launch of the Vulcan Centaur was initially scheduled for 2019 but faced multiple delays due to developmental challenges with its new BE-4 first-stage engine and the Centaur second stage.

The Vulcan Centaur conducted its first launch on January 8, 2024, carrying the Peregrine lunar lander as part of NASA's Commercial Lunar Payload Services program. Its second flight, conducted on October 4, 2024, as part of the U.S. Space Force's National Security Space Launch (NSSL) certification process, achieved its planned orbit despite the loss of a nozzle on one of the GEM-63XL solid rocket boosters. Following a five-month review, the Space Force certified Vulcan for NSSL missions in March 2025. A similar booster anomaly occurred during the USSF-87 mission on February 12, 2026. Although the rocket delivered its payload to orbit, the Space Force suspended NSSL launches pending an investigation and corrective action. Vulcan returned to flight on November 15, 2026, carrying 40 satellites for Amazon Leo. During the flight, the rocket malfunctioned and failed to deliver the payload to orbit, marking ULA's first total mission failure.

In 2026, NASA selected the VC2 version of the launch vehicle as a candidate for human-rating, so it can support Boeing CST-100 Starliner launches after the last few Atlas V launch vehicles are used or aged out.

== Description ==
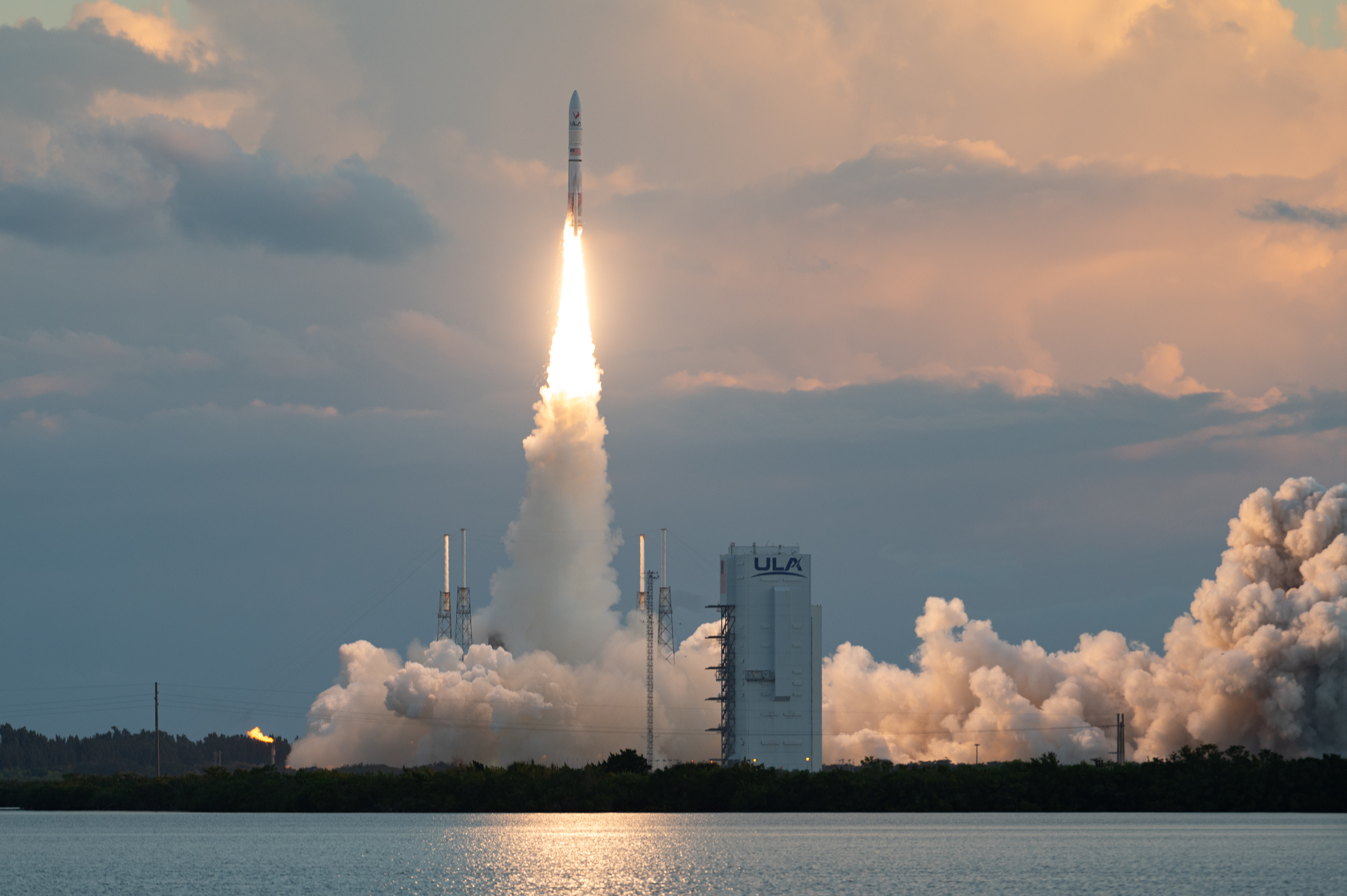
Launch of the rocket's second certification flight in 2024.

The Vulcan Centaur re-uses many technologies from ULA's Atlas V and Delta IV launch vehicles, with an aim to achieve better performance and lower production costs. Also, unlike vertically integrated competitors like SpaceX and Blue Origin, ULA (itself a joint venture between Boeing and Lockheed Martin) relies heavily on subcontractors to build major components of the rocket.

The Vulcan's first stage shares a common heritage with the Delta IV's Common Booster Core. It is built in the same Decatur, Alabama factory using much of the same manufacturing equipment, but is about 0.3 meters (1 ft) larger in diameter. The most significant change in the first stage is its use of liquid methane (liquefied natural gas) as fuel in two BE-4 engines developed by Blue Origin. Compared to the liquid hydrogen used on the Delta IV, methane is denser and has a higher boiling point, allowing for smaller, lighter fuel tanks. It also burns cleaner than the kerosene used in the Atlas V, reducing hydrocarbon buildup in engines, which would facilitate refurbishment under the proposed SMART reuse system.

The rocket's second stage, the Centaur V, is an upgraded version of the Centaur III used on the Atlas V, offering enhanced performance. It is powered by two RL10 engines from Aerojet Rocketdyne, fueled by liquid hydrogen.

To further enhance payload capacity, the Vulcan Centaur can be equipped with up to six GEM 63XL solid rocket boosters (SRBs) from Northrop Grumman — a lengthened version of the GEM 63 SRBs used on the Atlas V.

A single-core Vulcan Centaur with six SRBs delivers heavy-lift capabilities comparable to the larger and more expensive three-core Delta IV Heavy. With a single core and six GEM boosters, the Vulcan Centaur can lift 27,200 kilograms (60,000 lb) to low Earth orbit (LEO), surpassing the Atlas V's maximum of 18,850 kg (41,560 lb) with a single core and five GEM boosters, and approaching the 28,790 kg (63,470 lb) capacity of the three-core Delta IV Heavy.

Beyond Gravity provides additional components, including the interstage adapter, payload fairing, and payload attachment fitting, which secures the payload and fairings to the second stage until commanded to release. The company also supplies a heat shield to protect equipment.

Designed to meet the National Security Space Launch (NSSL) program's requirements, the Vulcan Centaur is also designed to be capable of achieving human-rating certification, enabling it to carry crewed spacecraft such as the Boeing Starliner or Sierra Nevada Dream Chaser.

== History ==
=== Background ===
ULA decided to develop the Vulcan Centaur in 2014 for two main reasons. First, its commercial and civil customers were flocking to SpaceX's cheaper Falcon 9 reusable launch vehicle, leaving ULA increasingly reliant on U.S. military and spy agency contracts. Second, Russia's annexation of Crimea in 2014 heightened Congressional discomfort with the Pentagon's reliance on the Atlas V, which used the made-in-Russia RD-180 engine. In 2016, Congress passed a law barring the military from procuring launch services based on the RD-180 engine after 2022.

In September 2018, ULA announced that it had picked the BE-4 engine from Blue Origin and fueled by liquid oxygen (LOX) and liquid methane (CH_{4}) to replace the RD-180 on a new first-stage booster. The engine was already in its third year of development, and ULA said it expected the new stage and engine to start flying as soon as 2019. Two of the 2,400-kilonewton (550,000 lbf)-thrust BE-4 engines were to be used on a new launch vehicle booster.

A month later, ULA restructured company processes and its workforce to reduce costs. The company said that the successor to Atlas V would blend existing Atlas V and Delta IV with a goal of halving the cost of the Atlas V rocket.

=== Announcement ===
In 2015, ULA announced the Vulcan rocket and proposed to incrementally replace existing vehicles with it. Vulcan deployment was expected to begin with a new first stage based on the Delta IV's fuselage diameter and production process, and initially expected to use two BE-4 engines or the Aerojet Rocketdyne AR1 as an alternative. The second stage was to be the existing Centaur III, already used on Atlas V. A later upgrade, the Advanced Cryogenic Evolved Stage (ACES), was planned for introduction a few years after Vulcan's first flight. ULA also revealed a design concept for reuse of the Vulcan booster engines, thrust structure and first stage avionics, which could be detached as a module from the propellant tanks after booster engine cutoff; the module would re-enter the atmosphere behind an inflatable heat shield.

=== Funding ===
Through the first several years, the ULA board of directors made quarterly funding commitments to Vulcan Centaur development. As of October 2018, the US government had committed about $1.2 billion in a public–private partnership to Vulcan Centaur development, with plans for more once ULA concluded a National Security Space Launch contract.

By March 2016, the United States Air Force (USAF) had committed up to $202 million for Vulcan development. ULA had not yet estimated the total cost of development, but CEO Tory Bruno said that "new rockets typically cost $2 billion, including $1 billion for the main engine". In March 2018, Bruno said the Vulcan-Centaur had been "75% privately funded" up to that point. In October 2018, following a request for proposals and technical evaluation, ULA was awarded $967 million to develop a prototype Vulcan launch system as part of the National Security Space Launch program.

=== Development, production, and testing ===
In September 2015, it was announced that BE-4 rocket engine production would be expanded to allow more testing. The following January, ULA was designing two versions of the Vulcan first stage; the BE-4 version has a 5.4 m (18 ft) diameter to support the use of the less dense methane fuel. In late 2017, the upper stage was changed to the larger and heavier Centaur V, and the launch vehicle was renamed Vulcan Centaur. In May 2018, ULA announced the selection of Aerojet Rocketdyne's RL10 engine for the Vulcan Centaur upper stage. That September, ULA announced the selection of the Blue Origin BE-4 engine for Vulcan's first stage. The first launch faced multiple delays due to developmental challenges with its new BE-4 first-stage engine and the Centaur second-stage. In October, the USAF released an NSSL launch service agreement with new requirements, delaying Vulcan's initial launch to April 2021, after an earlier postponement to 2020.

In August 2019, the parts of Vulcan's mobile launcher platform (MLP) were transported to the Spaceflight Processing Operations Center (SPOC) near SLC-40 and SLC-41, Cape Canaveral, Florida. The MLP was fabricated in eight sections and moved at 3 mph (4.8 km/h) on rail bogies, standing 183 ft (56 m) tall. In February 2021, ULA shipped the first completed Vulcan core booster to Florida for Pathfinder tests ahead of the Vulcan's debut launch. Testing continued with the pathfinder booster throughout that year.

In August 2019, ULA said Vulcan Centaur would first fly in early 2021, carrying Astrobotic Technology's Peregrine lunar lander. By December 2020, the launch had been delayed to 2022 because of technical problems with the BE-4 main engine. In June 2021, Astrobotic said Peregrine would not be ready on time due to the COVID-19 pandemic, delaying the mission and Vulcan Centaur's first launch; further Peregrine delays put the launch of Vulcan into 2023. In March 2023, a Centaur V test stage failed during a test sequence. To fix the problem, ULA changed the structure of the stage and built a new Centaur for Vulcan Centaur's maiden flight. In October 2023, ULA announced they aimed to launch Vulcan Centaur by year's end.

=== Certification flights ===
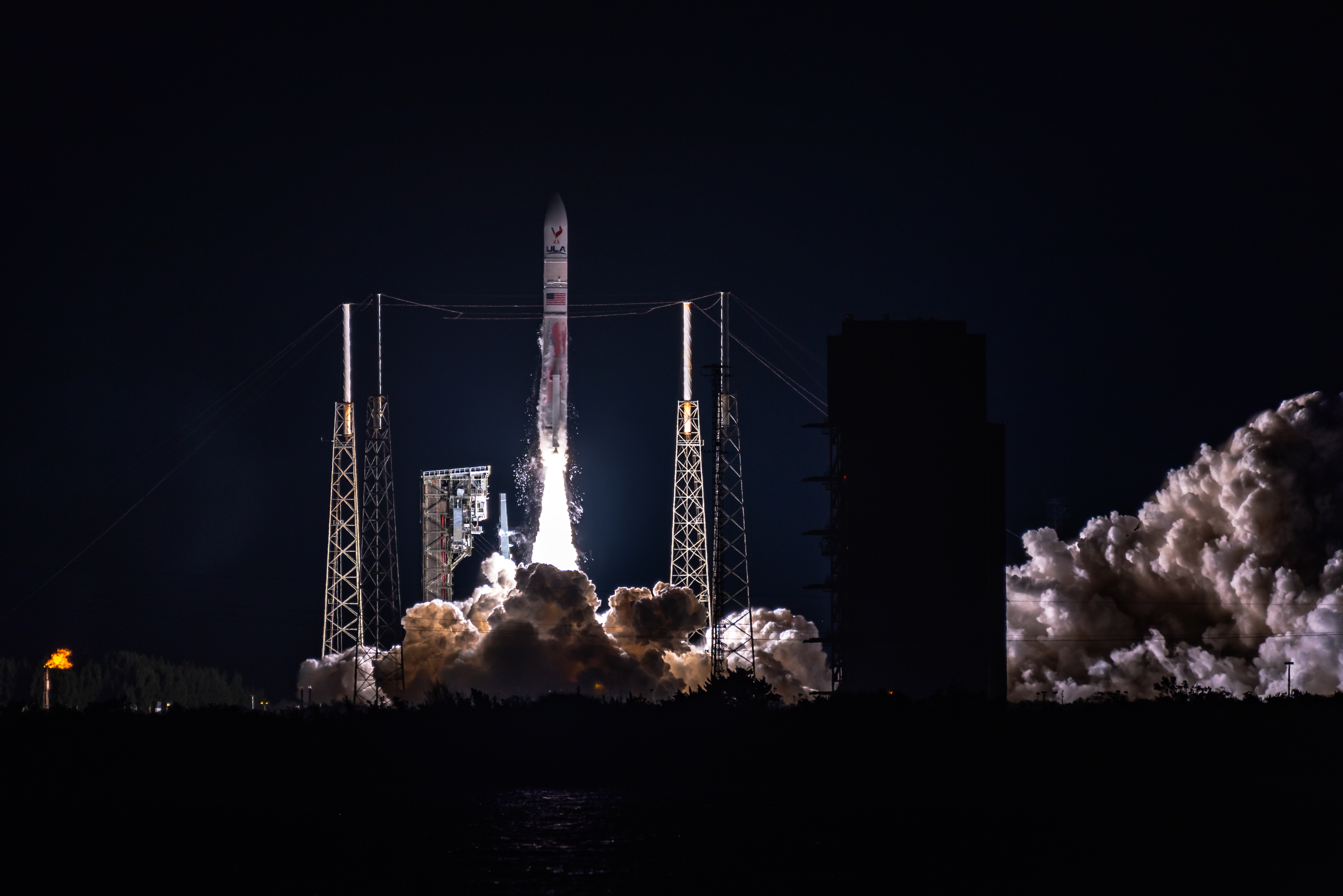
Launch of the Peregrine lunar lander on Vulcan Centaur's first flight.

On January 8, 2024, Vulcan lifted off for the first time. The flight used the VC2S configuration, with two solid rocket boosters and a standard-length fairing. A 4-minute trans-lunar injection burn followed by payload separation put the Peregrine lander on a trajectory to the Moon. One hour and 18 minutes into the flight, the Centaur upper stage fired for a third time, sending it into a heliocentric orbit to test how it would behave in long missions, such as those required to send payloads to geostationary orbit.

A failure in the Peregrine's propulsion system shortly after separation prevented it from landing on the Moon; Astrobotic said the Vulcan Centaur rocket performed without problems.

On August 14, 2019, ULA won a commercial competition when it was announced that the second Vulcan certification flight would be named SNC Demo-1, the first of seven Dream Chaser CRS-2 flights under NASA's Commercial Resupply Services program. They will use the four-SRB VC4 configuration. The SNC Demo-1 was scheduled for launch no earlier than April 2024.

After Vulcan Centaur's second certification mission, the rocket will be qualified for use on U.S. military missions. As of August 2020, Vulcan was to launch ULA's awarded 60% share of National Security Space Launch payloads from 2022 to 2027, but delays occurred. The Space Force's USSF-51 launch in late 2022 was the first national security classified mission, but in May 2021 the spacecraft was reassigned to an Atlas V to "mitigate schedule risk associated with Vulcan Centaur non-recurring design validation". For similar reasons, the Kuiper Systems prototype flight was moved to an Atlas V rocket.

After Vulcan's first launch in January 2024, developmental delays with the Dream Chaser led ULA to contemplate replacing it with a mass simulator, so Vulcan could move ahead with the certification required by its Air Force contract. Bloomberg News reported in May 2024 that United Launch Alliance was accruing financial penalties due to delays in the military launch contracts. On May 10, Air Force Assistant Secretary Frank Calvelli wrote to Boeing and Lockheed executives. "I am growing concerned with ULA's ability to scale manufacturing of its Vulcan rocket and scale its launch cadence to meet our needs", Calvelli wrote in the letter, a copy of which was obtained by the Washington Post. "Currently there is military satellite capability sitting on the ground due to Vulcan delays." In June 2024, Bruno announced that Vulcan would make its second flight in September with a mass simulator with some "experiments and demonstrations" to help develop future technology for the Centaur upper stage.

Vulcan Centaur lifted off on the second of two flights needed to certify the rocket for future NSSL missions at 11:25 UTC on October 4, 2024. Approximately 37 seconds into the launch, the nozzle on one of the solid rocket boosters (SRB) fell off, resulting in a shower of debris in the exhaust plume. Although the SRB continued to function for its full 90-second burn, the anomaly led to reduced, asymmetrical thrust. This caused the rocket to slightly tilt before the guidance system and main engines successfully corrected and extended their burn by roughly 20 seconds to compensate. Despite the anomaly, the rocket achieved an acceptable orbital insertion. The nozzle anomaly added to the already extensive process required to certify the Vulcan for NSSL missions. Following a five-month review, the Space Force certified the Vulcan on March 26, 2025.

=== Operational issues ===
Despite achieving certification, military officials have expressed sharp dissatisfaction with Vulcan's performance during its protracted development. In written testimony to the House Armed Services Committee in May 2025, Major General Stephen G. Purdy said that the program had performed "unsatisfactorily" in the previous year. He noted that the slow transition from the retired Atlas and Delta vehicles to Vulcan had delayed four national security launches, hindering the completion of Space Force objectives. Purdy said that, moving forward, United Launch Alliance must "repair trust" and demonstrate greater accountability.

In February 2026, a second issue involving a solid rocket booster occurred on Vulcan's fourth flight. Although the rocket successfully delivered its payload to orbit, the Space Force suspended NSSL launches pending an investigation and corrective action. Vulcan returned to flight on November 15, 2026, carrying 40 satellites for Amazon Leo. However, the mission failed to deliver its payload to orbit, marking the first total mission failure for ULA.

Several days after the failure, ULA said its preliminary review indicated that the first stage underperformed because of an inadequate fuel supply rather than a problem with the BE-4 engines. Blue Origin had recently completed an oxygen valve retrofit on the engines used for the Vulcan flight, following a faulty BE-4 valve that caused a New Glenn rocket to explode on the launch pad. ULA reported that the Centaur V second stage performed well but could not compensate for the first-stage underperformance. The solid rocket boosters also performed nominally, following nozzle improvements introduced after the fourth flight failure.

== Versions and configurations ==
ULA has four-character designations for the various Vulcan Centaur configurations. They start with VC for the Vulcan first stage and the Centaur upper stage. The third character is the number of SRBs attached to the Vulcan—0, 2, 4 or 6—and the fourth denotes the payload-fairing length: S for Standard (15.5 m [51 ft]) or L for Long (21.3 m [70 ft]). For example, "VC6L" would represent a Vulcan first stage, a Centaur upper stage, six SRBs and a long-configuration fairing. The Vulcan Centaur with two or six SRBs is the standard offering, with the zero- and four SRB variants offered on a mission-unique basis.

Starting in late 2025, ULA plans to upgrade the Centaur upper stage with the RL10E engine, which will have a fixed nozzle extension and offer slightly increased thrust and specific impulse, offering minor improvements to payload capacities.

=== Capabilities ===
The payload capacity of Vulcan Centaur versions are:

Version	SRBs	Payload mass to...							
Version	SRBs	ISS (Note: 407 km (253 mi) circular orbit at 51.6° inclination)	SSO (Note: 555 km (345 mi) circular orbit at 98.75° inclination)	MEO (Note: 20,368 km (12,656 mi) circular orbit at 55° inclination)	GEO (Note: 36,101 km (22,432 mi) circular orbit at 0° inclination)	GTO (Note: 1,800 m/s delta-V with 185 km (115 mi) perigee and 35,786 km (22,236 mi) apogee orbit at 27° inclination)	Molniya (Note: 1,203 km (748 mi) perigee and 39,170 km (24,340 mi) apogee orbit at 63.4° inclination)	TLI (Note: Characteristic energy C_{3} = −2 km^{2}/sec^{2})	TMI (Note: C_{3} = +20 km^{2}/sec^{2})
VC0	0	8,800 kg (19,400 lb)	7,900 kg (17,400 lb)	300 kg (660 lb)	—N/a	3,300 kg (7,300 lb)	2,500 kg (5,500 lb)	2,100 kg (4,600 lb)	—N/a
VC2	2	16,300 kg (35,900 lb)	14,400 kg (31,700 lb)	3,800 kg (8,400 lb)	2,500 kg (5,500 lb)	8,300 kg (18,300 lb)	6,200 kg (13,700 lb)	6,200 kg (13,700 lb)	3,600 kg (7,900 lb)
VC4	4	21,400 kg (47,200 lb)	18,500 kg (40,800 lb)	6,100 kg (13,400 lb)	4,800 kg (10,600 lb)	11,600 kg (25,600 lb)	8,900 kg (19,600 lb)	9,100 kg (20,100 lb)	6,000 kg (13,000 lb)
VC6	6	25,600 kg (56,400 lb)	22,300 kg (49,200 lb)	7,900 kg (17,400 lb)	6,300 kg (13,900 lb)	14,400 kg (31,700 lb)	10,600 kg (23,400 lb)	11,300 kg (24,900 lb)	7,600 kg (16,800 lb)
VC6 (upgrade) (Note: Centaur upper stage engines upgraded to RL10E)	6	26,900 kg (59,300 lb)	TBA	8,600 kg (19,000 lb)	7,000 kg (15,000 lb)	15,300 kg (33,700 lb)	TBA	12,100 kg (26,700 lb)	7,600 kg (16,800 lb)

Notes

These capabilities reflect NSSL requirements, plus room for growth.

A Vulcan Centaur with six solid rocket boosters can put 27,200 kilograms (60,000 lb) into low Earth orbit, nearly as much as the three-core Delta IV Heavy.

== Launch history ==
=== 2024 ===
Flight No.	Date / time (UTC)	Configuration (Serial)	Launch site	Payload	Payload mass	Orbit	Customer	Outcome
1	January 8, 2024; 07:18	VC2S (V‑001)	Cape Canaveral, SLC‑41	Peregrine lander	1,283 kg (2,829 lb)	TLI	Astrobotic Technology	Success
1	January 8, 2024; 07:18	VC2S (V‑001)	Cape Canaveral, SLC‑41	Enterprise (space burial)	1,283 kg (2,829 lb)	Heliocentric	Celestis	Success
1	Maiden flight of Vulcan Centaur and VC2S Configuration. Certification-1 mission, the first of two launches needed to certify the rocket for National Security Space Launch (NSSL) missions. Payload from Celestis, demonstrated engine restart capability of the Centaur upper stage delivering multiple payloads to different orbits. The Peregrine payload failed in transit to the Moon, precluding a landing attempt, due to reasons unrelated to the launch vehicle.							
2	October 4, 2024; 11:25	VC2S (V‑002)	Cape Canaveral, SLC‑41	Mass simulator	1,500 kg (3,300 lb)	Heliocentric	United Launch Alliance	Success
2	Certification-2 mission, the second of two launches needed to certify the rocket for NSSL missions. Originally scheduled to carry the first flight of Dream Chaser; however, due to schedule delays with Dream Chaser, ULA flew a mass simulator with experiments and demonstrations of future Centaur V technologies. Approximately 37 seconds into the launch, the nozzle on one of solid rocket boosters (SRB) fell off resulting in a shower of debris in the exhaust plume. Although the SRB continued to function for its full 90-second burn, the loss of the nozzle led to reduced and asymmetrical thrust causing the rocket to momentarily tilt slightly. The guidance system adjusted the main engines and extended their burn by roughly 20 seconds to compensate for the loss with the rocket achieving nominal orbital insertion. The nozzle failure was attributed to a manufacturing defect in an insulator located inside the nozzle.							

=== 2025 ===
Flight No.	Date / time (UTC)	Configuration (Serial)	Launch site	Payload	Payload mass	Orbit	Customer	Launch outcome
3	August 13, 2025; 00:56	VC4S (V‑003)	Cape Canaveral, SLC‑41	USSF-106 (NTS-3 & TBA)	~1,250 kg (2,760 lb)	GSO	U.S. Space Force	Success
3	Maiden flight of VC4S configuration. First NSSL mission for Vulcan Centaur. Carried Navigation Technology Satellite 3 (NTS-3), an experimental spacecraft to test technologies for next-generation GPS satellites.							

=== 2026 ===
Flight No.	Date / time (UTC)	Configuration (Serial)	Launch site	Payload	Payload mass	Orbit	Customer	Launch outcome
4	February 12, 2026; 09:22	VC4S (V‑005)	Cape Canaveral, SLC‑41	USSF‑87	Unknown	GSO	U.S. Space Force	Success
4	Primary payloads were GSSAP 7 and 8, accompanied by secondary payloads aboard Northrop Grumman's ESPAStar platform. A GEM-63XL solid rocket booster experienced an anomaly, but the core stage compensated for the loss of thrust and the vehicle achieved its planned orbit. Following the anomaly, the U.S. Space Force suspended Vulcan launches for NSSL missions pending investigation and corrective action. Flight was the first to use ULA's Offline Vertical Integration (OVI) process and, at nearly ten hours from liftoff to mission completion, was the longest in ULA's history.							
5	November 15, 2026; 17:40	VC6L (V‑012)	Cape Canaveral, SLC‑41	LeoSat × 40 (LV‑01)	22,700 kg (50,000 lb)	LEO	Amazon Leo	Failure
5	First of 38 planned Vulcan launches for Amazon Leo, formerly Project Kuiper. Maiden flight of the VC6L configuration, first flight with six solid rocket boosters, first flight of the longer 70ft payload fairing, first flight of the shortened LEO-optimized Centaur V, and first Vulcan assembled in VIF-A. The rocket malfunctioned during flight and failed to deliver the payload to orbit, resulting in ULA's first total mission failure. On November 16, the Federal Aviation Administration (FAA) requested ULA to perform an investigation into the failure.							

== Future launches ==
Future launches are listed chronologically when firm plans are in place. The order of the later launches is much less certain. Launches are expected to take place "no earlier than" (NET) the listed date.

=== 2026 ===
Date / time (UTC)	Configuration	Launch site	Payload	Orbit	Customer
2026	VC6L	Cape Canaveral, SLC‑41	LeoSat × 40 (LV-02)	LEO	Amazon Leo
2026	Second of 38 Vulcan Centaur launches for Amazon Leo.				
2026	VC6L	Cape Canaveral, SLC‑41	LeoSat × 40 (LV-03)	LEO	Amazon Leo
2026	Third of 38 Vulcan Centaur launches for Amazon Leo.				

=== 2027 ===
Date / time (UTC)	Configuration	Launch site	Payload	Orbit	Customer
2027	TBA	Cape Canaveral, SLC‑41	USSF-50 (NG-OPIR-GEO 2)	GEO	U.S. Space Force
2027	Next Generation Overhead Persistent Infrared satellite.				
2027	TBA	Cape Canaveral, SLC‑41	NROL-88	TBA	NRO
2027	Classified NRO Mission.				
2027	TBA	Cape Canaveral, SLC‑41	USSF-57 (NG-OPIR-GEO 1)	GEO	U.S. Space Force
2027	Next Generation Overhead Persistent Infrared satellite.				
2027	VC2S	Vandenberg, SLC‑3E	SDA T1TR-B	LEO	SDA
2027	Tranche 1 Tracking Layer B missile tracking satellites. First Vulcan launch from Vandenberg.				
2027	VC4	Cape Canaveral, SLC‑41	NROL-64	TBA	NRO
2027	First NRO launch on Vulcan. Possibly SunRISE 1-6 as secondary.				
2027	VC2S	Vandenberg, SLC‑3E	SDA T1TR-D	LEO	SDA
2027	Tranche 1 Tracking Layer D missile tracking satellites.				
2027	TBA	Vandenberg, SLC‑3E	SDA T2TL-B	LEO	SDA
2027	Tranche 2 Transport Layer B missile tracking satellites.				
2027	VC4L	Cape Canaveral, SLC‑41	SSC Demo-1 (Dream Chaser Tenacity)	LEO (ISS)	NASA (CRS)
2027	First flight of Dream Chaser. Maiden flight of the Vulcan Centaur VC4L configuration.				
2027	TBA	Cape Canaveral, SLC‑41	USSF-43 (LDPE-4 & TBA)	TBA	U.S. Space Force
2027	Rapid On-orbit Space Technology Evaluation Ring (ROOSTER)-4				
2027	VC2L	Cape Canaveral, SLC‑41	WGS-11 (PTS-P1)	GEO	U.S. Space Force
2027	Military communications satellite. Maiden flight of the Vulcan Centaur VC2L configuration. Protected Tactical Satcom prototype payload. The PTS payload will fly on dedicated Northrop Grumman built ESPAStar-HP satellite bus.				
2027	VC4S	Cape Canaveral, SLC‑41	USSF-112	TBA	U.S. Space Force
2027	Classified payload.				
2027	TBA	Cape Canaveral, SLC‑41	USSF-23	TBA	U.S. Space Force
2027	Classified payload.				
2027	TBA	Cape Canaveral, SLC‑41	USSF-16	TBA	U.S. Space Force
2027	Classified payload.				
2027	TBA	Vandenberg, SLC‑3E	USSF-114	TBA	U.S. Space Force
2027	Classified payload.				
2027	TBA	Vandenberg, SLC‑3E	NROL-83	TBA	NRO
2027	Classified NRO payload. First announced Vulcan Centaur launch from Vandenberg.				
2027	TBA	Cape Canaveral, SLC‑41	Silentbarker 2A, 2B, 2C (NROL-118)	GEO	U.S. Space Force (NRO)
2027	Classified USSF & NRO partnered program.				
2027	TBA	Cape Canaveral, SLC‑41	NROL-56	TBA	NRO
2027	Classified NRO payload.				
2027	TBA	Vandenberg, SLC‑3E	NROL-73	TBA	NRO
2027	Classified NRO payload.				
2027	TBA	Vandenberg, SLC‑3E	NROL-100	TBA	NRO
2027	Classified NRO payload.				
2027	TBA	Cape Canaveral, SLC‑41	NROL-109	TBA	NRO
2027	Classified NRO payload.				
2027	TBA	Cape Canaveral, SLC‑41	STP-5	LEO	U.S. Space Force
2027	Two satellites for Department of Defense Strategic Capabilities Office				
2027	TBA	Cape Canaveral, SLC‑41	Missile Track Custody 1 (USSF-95)	MEO	U.S. Space Force
2027	First launch of Missile Track Custody satellites.				

=== 2028 and beyond ===
Date / time (UTC)	Configuration	Launch site	Payload	Orbit	Customer
Q3 2028	TBA	Cape Canaveral, SLC‑41	USSF-70	TBA	U.S. Space Force
Q3 2028	Swapped with Falcon 9 due to GPS IIII SV10 switch under National Security Space Launch.				
2028	TBA	Cape Canaveral, SLC‑41	GPS IIIF-1	MEO	U.S. Space Force
2028	First GPS Block IIIF navigation satellite.				
2029	TBA	Cape Canaveral, SLC‑41	GPS IIIF-2	MEO	U.S. Space Force
2029	Also designated USSF-49 under NSSL.				
2030	TBA	Cape Canaveral, SLC‑41	GPS IIIF-3	MEO	U.S. Space Force
2030	Also designated USSF-15 under NSSL.				
2030	TBA	Cape Canaveral, SLC‑41	GPS IIIF-4	MEO	U.S. Space Force
2030	Also designated USSF-88 under NSSL.				

== Potential upgrades ==
ULA plans to continually improve the Vulcan Centaur. The company originally planned to introduce its first upgrades in 2025, with subsequent improvements occurring roughly every two to three years.

Since 2015, ULA has spoken of several technologies that would improve the Vulcan launch vehicle's capabilities. These include first-stage improvements to make the most expensive components potentially reusable and second-stage improvements to allow the rocket to operate for months in Earth-orbit cislunar space.

=== Long-endurance upper stages ===
The ACES upper stage—fueled with liquid oxygen (LOX) and liquid hydrogen (LH_{2}) and powered by up to four rocket engines with the engine type yet to be selected—was a conceptual upgrade to Vulcan's upper stage at the time of the announcement in 2015. This stage could be upgraded to include Integrated Vehicle Fluids technology that would allow the upper stage to function in orbit for weeks instead of hours. The ACES upper stage was cancelled in September 2020, and ULA said the Vulcan second stage would now be the Centaur V upper stage: a larger, more powerful version of the Dual Engine Centaur upper stage used by the Atlas V N22. A senior executive at ULA said the Centaur V design was also heavily influenced by ACES.

However, ULA said in 2021 that it is working to add more value to upper stages by having them perform tasks such as operating as space tugs. CEO Tory Bruno said ULA was working on upper stages with hundreds of times the endurance of those currently in use.

On August 28, 2025, in an infographic by ULA posted by Tory Bruno, a variant of Centaur V was referred as "ACES", this time standing for "Advanced Centaur Endurance Stage". Few details were provided about this updated ACES concept, other than a mention of "Smart Propulsion", which was not further explained

=== SMART reuse ===
A method of main engine reuse called Sensible Modular Autonomous Return Technology (SMART) is a proposed upgrade for Vulcan Centaur. In the concept, the booster engines, avionics, and thrust structure detach as a module from the propellant tanks after booster engine cutoff. The engine module then falls through the atmosphere protected by an inflatable heat shield. After parachute deployment, the engine section splashes down, using the heat shield as a raft. Before 2022, ULA intended to catch the engine section using a helicopter, similar to Electron reuse. ULA estimated this technology could reduce the cost of the first-stage propulsion by 90% and 65% of the total first-stage cost. Although SMART reuse was not initially funded for development, from 2021, the higher launch cadence required to launch the Amazon Leo mega constellation provided support for the concept's business case. Consequently, ULA has stated that it plans to begin testing the technology during its launches of the satellite internet constellation, with timing of the tests to be agreed upon with Amazon, the developer of Amazon Leo.

=== Vulcan Heavy ===
In September 2020, ULA announced they were studying a "Vulcan Heavy" variant with three booster cores, similar to the Delta IV Heavy. Speculation about a new variant had been rampant for months after an image of a model of that version popped on social media. ULA CEO Tory Bruno later tweeted a clearer image of the model and said it was the subject of ongoing study.

=== LEO Optimized Centaur ===
During the Vulcan Cert-2 mission broadcast on October 4, 2024, ULA announced plans to develop a "LEO Optimized Centaur", scheduled to launch aboard a Vulcan in 2025. On August 28, 2025, it was revealed that this Centaur V variant, now designated CV-L, is 1.94 m (6 ft 4 in) shorter than the original Centaur V, now renamed CV-HE (Centaur V High Energy). Unlike the CV-HE, which uses a hydrolox-fueled reaction control system (RCS), the CV-L will employ a hydrazine-fueled RCS.

=== Human-rated VC2 ===
With SpaceX looking to decommission both its Falcon 9 launch vehicle and its Dragon 2 spacecraft by around 2030, NASA announced on September 28, 2026, that it would fund certification of Vulcan Centaur VC2, specifically using the CV-L upper stage, for human spaceflight. Human-rating Vulcan would allow Boeing to fly its CST-100 Starliner in the VC2 configuration after it uses up or ages out its fellow ULA Atlas V launch vehicles that are no longer in production.

== See also ==
- Heavy-lift launch vehicle
- Comparison of orbital launch systems
  - OmegA – Canceled US launch vehicle
  - New Glenn – Partially-reusable heavy-lift launch vehicle by Blue Origin
  - Falcon 9
  - Falcon Heavy
  - Ariane 6
  - H3
