= List of Amazon Leo launches =

Satellite Internet constellation launches list

Amazon Leo
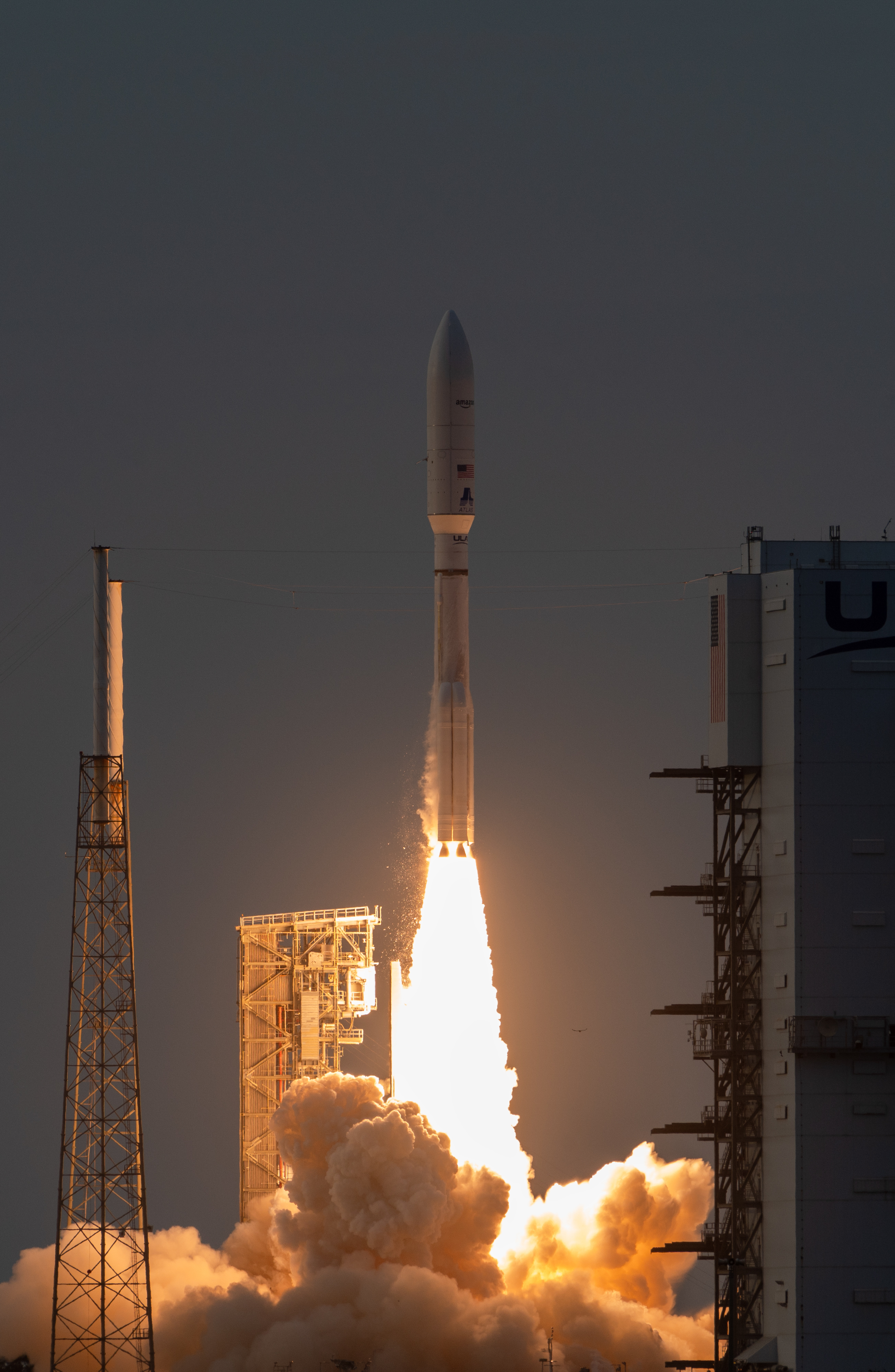
- An Atlas V launching KA-01 in April 2025, the first flight of production Amazon Leo satellites.
- Manufacturer: Amazon Leo
- Country of origin: United States
- Operator: Amazon
- Applications: Satellite Internet access
- Website: leo.amazon.com

Specifications
- Spacecraft type: Amazon Leo
- Regime: LEO

Production
- Status: Active
- Launched: Flights: 16; Satellites, Total: 438; Satellites, Operational: 396
- Maiden launch: October 6, 2023 (Protoflight)
- Last launch: November 15, 2026 (LV-01, most recent)

Amazon Leo is a satellite internet constellation operated by Amazon providing satellite Internet access to most users at different locations on Earth.

== Launch history ==
=== Statistics ===
==== Launch outcome ====
- Failure
- Partial failure
- Success
- Planned

==== Launch vehicle ====
- Atlas V
- Falcon 9
- Ariane 6
- Vulcan Centaur
- New Glenn

=== List of launches ===
No.	Launch (UTC)	Vehicle (Flight)	Mission	Number of satellites	Deployment orbit	Operational orbit	Launch site	Launch status
1	October 6, 2023; 18:06	Atlas V 501 (AV-104)	Protoflight	2	LEO, 500 km, 30°	LEO, 500 km, 30°	Cape Canaveral, SLC‑41	Success
1	First of nine Atlas V launches. The launch carried two prototype satellites, named KuiperSat-1 & 2.							
2	April 28, 2025; 23:01	Atlas V 551 (AV-107)	KA-01	27	LEO, 450 km, 51.9°	LEO, 630 km, 51.9°	Cape Canaveral, SLC‑41	Success
2	First launch of production satellites.							
3	June 23, 2025; 10:54	Atlas V 551 (AV-105)	KA-02	27	LEO, 450 km, 51.9°	LEO, 630 km, 51.9°	Cape Canaveral, SLC‑41	Success
4	July 16, 2025; 06:30	Falcon 9 Block 5 (F9-504)	KF-01	24	LEO, 465 km, 51.9°	LEO, 630 km, 51.9°	Cape Canaveral, SLC‑40	Success
4	First of a three launch batch on Falcon 9, purchased in 2023.							
5	August 11, 2025; 12:35	Falcon 9 Block 5 (F9-514)	KF-02	24	LEO, 465 km, 51.9°	LEO, 630 km, 51.9°	Cape Canaveral, SLC‑40	Success
6	September 25, 2025; 12:09	Atlas V 551 (AV-108)	KA-03	27	LEO, 450 km, 51.9°	LEO, 630 km, 51.9°	Cape Canaveral, SLC‑41	Success
7	October 14, 2025; 01:58	Falcon 9 Block 5 (F9-545)	KF-03	24	LEO, 465 km, 51.9°	LEO, 630 km, 51.9°	Cape Canaveral, SLC‑40	Success
8	December 16, 2025; 08:28	Atlas V 551 (AV-111)	LA-04	27	LEO, 450 km, 51.9°	LEO, 630 km, 51.9°	Cape Canaveral, SLC‑41	Success
8	First launch following the November 2025 rebranding from Project Kuiper to Amazon Leo.							
9	February 12, 2026; 16:45	Ariane 64 Block 1 (VA267)	LE-01	32	LEO, 465 km, 51.9°	LEO, 630 km, 51.9°	Guiana, ELA‑4	Success
9	First of 18 launches on Ariane 6.							
10	April 4, 2026; 05:46	Atlas V 551 (AV-109)	LA-05	29	LEO, 450 km, 51.9°	LEO, 630 km, 51.9°	Cape Canaveral, SLC‑41	Success
10	First launch of 29 (from 27) satellites on Atlas V, enabled by an upgraded RL-10C engine on the Centaur upper stage.							
11	April 28, 2026; 00:53	Atlas V 551 (AV-112)	LA-06	29	LEO, 450 km, 51.9°	LEO, 630 km, 51.9°	Cape Canaveral, SLC‑41	Success
12	April 30, 2026; 08:57	Ariane 64 Block 1 (VA268)	LE-02	32	LEO, 465 km, 51.9°	LEO, 630 km, 51.9°	Guiana, ELA‑4	Success
13	May 29, 2026; 23:53	Atlas V 551 (AV-113)	LA-07	29	LEO, 450 km, 51.9°	LEO, 630 km, 51.9°	Cape Canaveral, SLC‑41	Success
14	June 17, 2026; 12:21	Ariane 64 Block 2 (VA269)	LE-03	36	LEO, 465 km, 51.9°	LEO, 630 km, 51.9°	Guiana, ELA‑4	Success
14	First launch of 36 (from 32) satellites on Ariane 6, made possible by Ariane 64 Block 2 utilizing longer-burning P160C boosters in place of the current P120C.							
15	July 2, 2026; 04:30	Atlas V 551 (AV-114)	LA-08	29	LEO, 450 km, 51.9°	LEO, 630 km, 51.9°	Cape Canaveral, SLC‑41	Success
15	Last of nine launches on Atlas V.							
16	November 15, 2026 17:40	Vulcan Centaur VC6L (V‑012)	LV-01	40	—N/a	—N/a	Cape Canaveral, SLC‑41	Failure
16	First of 38 planned launches on Vulcan Centaur. The rocket malfunctioned during flight and failed to deliver the payload to orbit.							

== Future launches ==
Future launches are listed chronologically when firm plans are in place. Launches are expected to take place "no earlier than" (NET) the listed date.

=== Ariane 6 ===
Launch (UTC)	Vehicle	Mission	Number of satellites	Operational orbit	Launch site
November 23, 2026; 10:12	Ariane 64 Block 2	LE-04	36	LEO, 630 km	Guiana, ELA‑4
2027	Ariane 64 Block 2	LE-05	36	LEO, 630 km	Guiana, ELA‑4
2027	Ariane 64 Block 2	LE-06	36	LEO, 630 km	Guiana, ELA‑4
2027	Ariane 64 Block 2	LE-07	36	LEO, 630 km	Guiana, ELA‑4
2027	Ariane 64 Block 2	LE-08	36	LEO, 630 km	Guiana, ELA‑4
2027	Ariane 64 Block 2	LE-09	36	LEO, 630 km	Guiana, ELA‑4
2027	Ariane 64 Block 2	LE-10	36	LEO, 630 km	Guiana, ELA‑4
2027	Ariane 64 Block 2	LE-11	36	LEO, 630 km	Guiana, ELA‑4
2028	Ariane 64 Block 2	LE-12	36	LEO, 630 km	Guiana, ELA‑4
2028	Ariane 64 Block 2	LE-13	36	LEO, 630 km	Guiana, ELA‑4
2028	Ariane 64 Block 2	LE-14	36	LEO, 630 km	Guiana, ELA‑4
2028	Ariane 64 Block 2	LE-15	36	LEO, 630 km	Guiana, ELA‑4
2028	Ariane 64 Block 2	LE-16	36	LEO, 630 km	Guiana, ELA‑4
2028	Ariane 64 Block 2	LE-17	36	LEO, 630 km	Guiana, ELA‑4
2028	Ariane 64 Block 2	LE-18	36	LEO, 630 km	Guiana, ELA‑4
2029	Ariane 64 Block 2	LE-19	36	LEO, 630 km	Guiana, ELA‑4
2029	Ariane 64 Block 2	LE-20	36	LEO, 630 km	Guiana, ELA‑4
2029	Ariane 64 Block 2	LE-21	36	LEO, 630 km	Guiana, ELA‑4
2029	Ariane 64 Block 2	LE-22	36	LEO, 630 km	Guiana, ELA‑4
2029	Ariane 64 Block 2	LE-23	36	LEO, 630 km	Guiana, ELA‑4
2029	Ariane 64 Block 2	LE-24	36	LEO, 630 km	Guiana, ELA‑4

=== Falcon 9 ===
Launch (UTC)	Vehicle	Mission	Number of satellites	Operational orbit	Launch site
2027	Falcon 9 Block 5	LF-04	24	LEO, 630 km	Cape Canaveral, SLC‑40
2027	First of a ten launch batch on Falcon 9, purchased in 2025.				
2027	Falcon 9 Block 5	LF-05	24	LEO, 630 km	Cape Canaveral, SLC‑40
2027	Falcon 9 Block 5	LF-06	24	LEO, 630 km	Cape Canaveral, SLC‑40
2027	Falcon 9 Block 5	LF-07	24	LEO, 630 km	Cape Canaveral, SLC‑40
2027	Falcon 9 Block 5	LF-08	24	LEO, 630 km	Cape Canaveral, SLC‑40
2027	Falcon 9 Block 5	LF-09	24	LEO, 630 km	Cape Canaveral, SLC‑40
2027	Falcon 9 Block 5	LF-10	24	LEO, 630 km	Cape Canaveral, SLC‑40
2027	Falcon 9 Block 5	LF-11	24	LEO, 630 km	Cape Canaveral, SLC‑40
2027	Falcon 9 Block 5	LF-12	24	LEO, 630 km	Cape Canaveral, SLC‑40
2027	Falcon 9 Block 5	LF-13	24	LEO, 630 km	Cape Canaveral, SLC‑40

=== New Glenn ===
Launch (UTC)	Vehicle	Mission	Number of satellites	Operational orbit	Launch site
Q1 2027	New Glenn 7×2	LN-01	48	LEO, 630 km	Cape Canaveral, LC‑36A
Q1 2027	First of 24 launches on New Glenn. Originally planned to launch on June 4, 2026 until its intended launch vehicle was destroyed during a pad explosion. Satellites were not on board at the time of the incident.				
2027	New Glenn 7×2	LN-02	48	LEO, 630 km	Cape Canaveral, LC‑36A
2027	New Glenn 7×2	LN-03	48	LEO, 630 km	Cape Canaveral, LC‑36A
2027	New Glenn 7×2	LN-04	48	LEO, 630 km	Cape Canaveral, LC‑36A
2027	New Glenn 7×2	LN-05	48	LEO, 630 km	Cape Canaveral, LC‑36A
2027	New Glenn 7×2	LN-06	48	LEO, 630 km	Cape Canaveral, LC‑36A
2027	New Glenn 7×2	LN-07	48	LEO, 630 km	Cape Canaveral, LC‑36A
2027	New Glenn 7×2	LN-08	48	LEO, 630 km	Cape Canaveral, LC‑36A
2027	New Glenn 7×2	LN-09	48	LEO, 630 km	Cape Canaveral, LC‑36A
2027	New Glenn 7×2	LN-10	48	LEO, 630 km	Cape Canaveral, LC‑36A
2027	New Glenn 7×2	LN-11	48	LEO, 630 km	Cape Canaveral, LC‑36A
2027	New Glenn 7×2	LN-12	48	LEO, 630 km	Cape Canaveral, LC‑36A
2028	New Glenn 7×2	LN-13	48	LEO, 630 km	Cape Canaveral, LC‑36A
2028	New Glenn 7×2	LN-14	48	LEO, 630 km	Cape Canaveral, LC‑36A
2028	New Glenn 7×2	LN-15	48	LEO, 630 km	Cape Canaveral, LC‑36A
2028	New Glenn 7×2	LN-16	48	LEO, 630 km	Cape Canaveral, LC‑36A
2028	New Glenn 7×2	LN-17	48	LEO, 630 km	Cape Canaveral, LC‑36A
2028	New Glenn 7×2	LN-18	48	LEO, 630 km	Cape Canaveral, LC‑36A
2028	New Glenn 7×2	LN-19	48	LEO, 630 km	Cape Canaveral, LC‑36A
2028	New Glenn 7×2	LN-20	48	LEO, 630 km	Cape Canaveral, LC‑36A
2028	New Glenn 7×2	LN-21	48	LEO, 630 km	Cape Canaveral, LC‑36A
2028	New Glenn 7×2	LN-22	48	LEO, 630 km	Cape Canaveral, LC‑36A
2028	New Glenn 7×2	LN-23	48	LEO, 630 km	Cape Canaveral, LC‑36A
2028	New Glenn 7×2	LN-23	48	LEO, 630 km	Cape Canaveral, LC‑36A
2028	New Glenn 7×2	LN-24	48	LEO, 630 km	Cape Canaveral, LC‑36A

=== Vulcan Centaur ===
Launch (UTC)	Vehicle	Mission	Number of satellites	Operational orbit	Launch site
2026	Vulcan Centaur VC6L	LV-02	40	LEO, 630 km	Cape Canaveral, SLC‑41
2026	Vulcan Centaur VC6L	LV-03	40	LEO, 630 km	Cape Canaveral, SLC‑41
2027	Vulcan Centaur VC6L	LV-04	40	LEO, 630 km	Cape Canaveral, SLC‑41
2027	Vulcan Centaur VC6L	LV-05	40	LEO, 630 km	Cape Canaveral, SLC‑41
2027	Vulcan Centaur VC6L	LV-06	40	LEO, 630 km	Cape Canaveral, SLC‑41
2027	Vulcan Centaur VC6L	LV-07	40	LEO, 630 km	Cape Canaveral, SLC‑41
2027	Vulcan Centaur VC6L	LV-08	40	LEO, 630 km	Cape Canaveral, SLC‑41
2027	Vulcan Centaur VC6L	LV-09	40	LEO, 630 km	Cape Canaveral, SLC‑41
2027	Vulcan Centaur VC6L	LV-10	40	LEO, 630 km	Cape Canaveral, SLC‑41
2027	Vulcan Centaur VC6L	LV-11	40	LEO, 630 km	Cape Canaveral, SLC‑41
2027	Vulcan Centaur VC6L	LV-12	40	LEO, 630 km	Cape Canaveral, SLC‑41
2027	Vulcan Centaur VC6L	LV-13	40	LEO, 630 km	Cape Canaveral, SLC‑41
2027	Vulcan Centaur VC6L	LV-14	40	LEO, 630 km	Cape Canaveral, SLC‑41
2027	Vulcan Centaur VC6L	LV-15	40	LEO, 630 km	Cape Canaveral, SLC‑41
2027	Vulcan Centaur VC6L	LV-16	40	LEO, 630 km	Cape Canaveral, SLC‑41
2027	Vulcan Centaur VC6L	LV-17	40	LEO, 630 km	Cape Canaveral, SLC‑41
2027	Vulcan Centaur VC6L	LV-18	40	LEO, 630 km	Cape Canaveral, SLC‑41
2027	Vulcan Centaur VC6L	LV-19	40	LEO, 630 km	Cape Canaveral, SLC‑41
2027	Vulcan Centaur VC6L	LV-20	40	LEO, 630 km	Cape Canaveral, SLC‑41
2027	Vulcan Centaur VC6L	LV-21	40	LEO, 630 km	Cape Canaveral, SLC‑41
2027	Vulcan Centaur VC6L	LV-22	40	LEO, 630 km	Cape Canaveral, SLC‑41
2028	Vulcan Centaur VC6L	LV-23	40	LEO, 630 km	Cape Canaveral, SLC‑41
2028	Vulcan Centaur VC6L	LV-24	40	LEO, 630 km	Cape Canaveral, SLC‑41
2028	Vulcan Centaur VC6L	LV-25	40	LEO, 630 km	Cape Canaveral, SLC‑41
2028	Vulcan Centaur VC6L	LV-26	40	LEO, 630 km	Cape Canaveral, SLC‑41
2028	Vulcan Centaur VC6L	LV-27	40	LEO, 630 km	Cape Canaveral, SLC‑41
2028	Vulcan Centaur VC6L	LV-28	40	LEO, 630 km	Cape Canaveral, SLC‑41
2028	Vulcan Centaur VC6L	LV-29	40	LEO, 630 km	Cape Canaveral, SLC‑41
2028	Vulcan Centaur VC6L	LV-30	40	LEO, 630 km	Cape Canaveral, SLC‑41
2028	Vulcan Centaur VC6L	LV-31	40	LEO, 630 km	Cape Canaveral, SLC‑41
2028	Vulcan Centaur VC6L	LV-32	40	LEO, 630 km	Cape Canaveral, SLC‑41
2028	Vulcan Centaur VC6L	LV-33	40	LEO, 630 km	Cape Canaveral, SLC‑41
2028	Vulcan Centaur VC6L	LV-34	40	LEO, 630 km	Cape Canaveral, SLC‑41
2028	Vulcan Centaur VC6L	LV-35	40	LEO, 630 km	Cape Canaveral, SLC‑41
2028	Vulcan Centaur VC6L	LV-36	40	LEO, 630 km	Cape Canaveral, SLC‑41
2028	Vulcan Centaur VC6L	LV-37	40	LEO, 630 km	Cape Canaveral, SLC‑41
2028	Vulcan Centaur VC6L	LV-38	40	LEO, 630 km	Cape Canaveral, SLC‑41

== See also ==
- List of Starlink and Starshield launches
- List of Falcon 9 and Falcon Heavy launches
