= OTV-8 =

USA Classified X-37B spaceplane mission

USSF-36
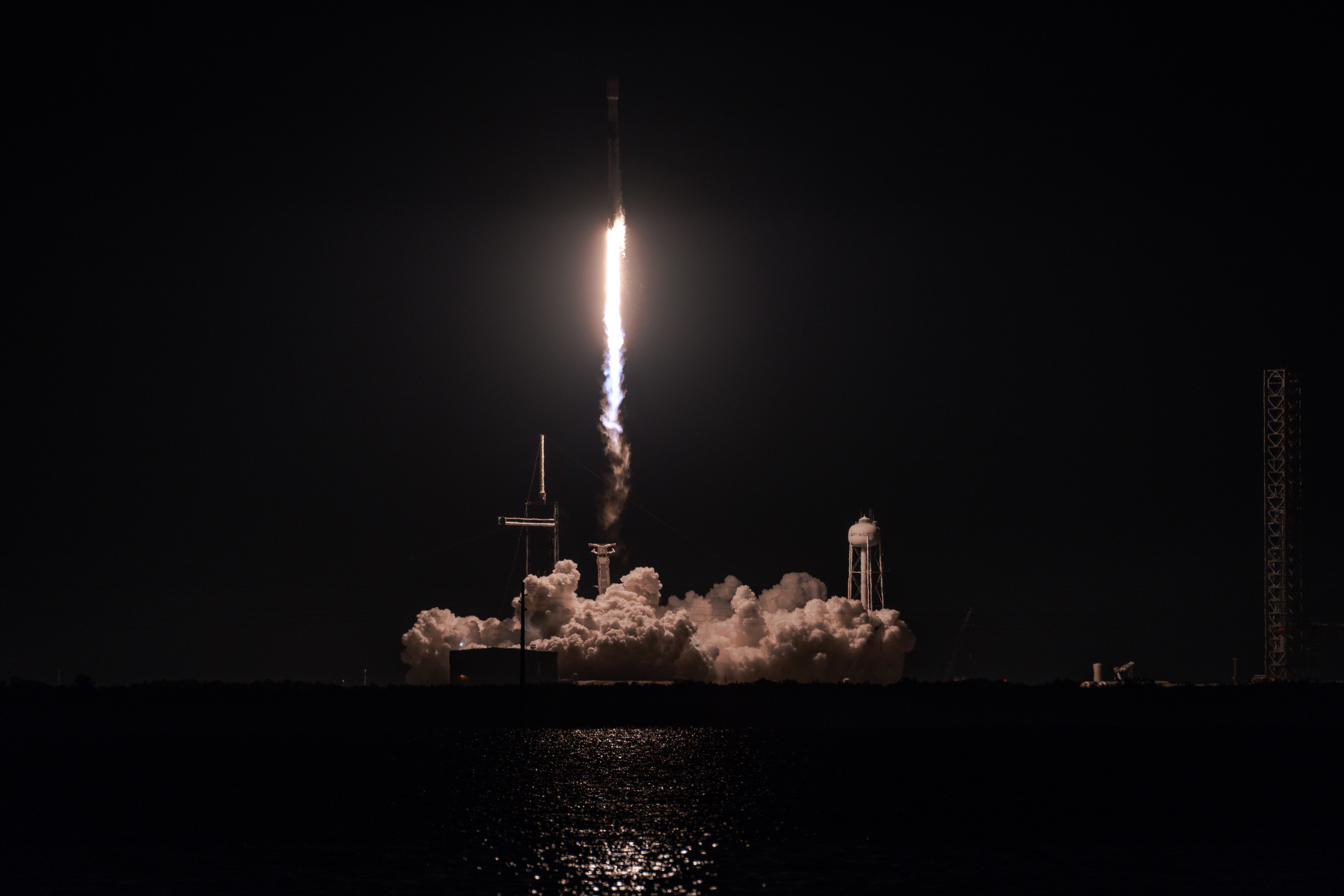
- Launch of OTV-8
- Mission type: Classified (in part)
- Operator: U.S. Space Force
- COSPAR ID: 2025-183A
- SATCAT no.: 65271
- Mission duration: 327 days, 19 hours, 41 minutes (elapsed)

Spacecraft properties
- Spacecraft type: Boeing X-37B
- Manufacturer: Boeing
- Launch mass: 6,350 kg (14,000 lb)
- Power: Deployable solar array, batteries

Start of mission
- Launch date: 22 August 2025, 03:50 UTC
- Rocket: Falcon 9 Block 5 B1092-6
- Launch site: Kennedy, LC-39A
- Contractor: SpaceX

Orbital parameters
- Reference system: Low Earth
- Perigee altitude: 331 km (206 mi)
- Apogee altitude: 342 km (213 mi)
- Inclination: 49.5°

Orbital Test Vehicle 8 (OTV-8), also referred to as United States Space Force-36 (USSF-36) or USA-555, is the fourth flight of the first Boeing X-37B, an American unmanned vertical-takeoff, horizontal-landing spaceplane. It was launched to a low Earth orbit (LEO) aboard a Falcon 9 Block 5 rocket (for the first time) from LC-39A on August 22, 2025.

The spaceplane is operated by the United States Space Force, which considers the mission classified and as such has not revealed the objectives.

== Payloads and experiments ==
Onboard experiments include a laser communications demo in low Earth orbit for more efficient and secure communications in future and the second experiment is to demonstrate world's highest performing quantum inertial sensor ever used in space, this system will help improving navigation by detecting rotation and acceleration of atoms.

== See also ==
- List of USSF launches
- List of USA satellites (501-1000), for USA-555
- OTV-1
- OTV-2
- OTV-3
- OTV-4
- OTV-5
- OTV-6
- OTV-7
