= OTV-7 =

USA Classified X-37B spaceplane mission

USSF-52
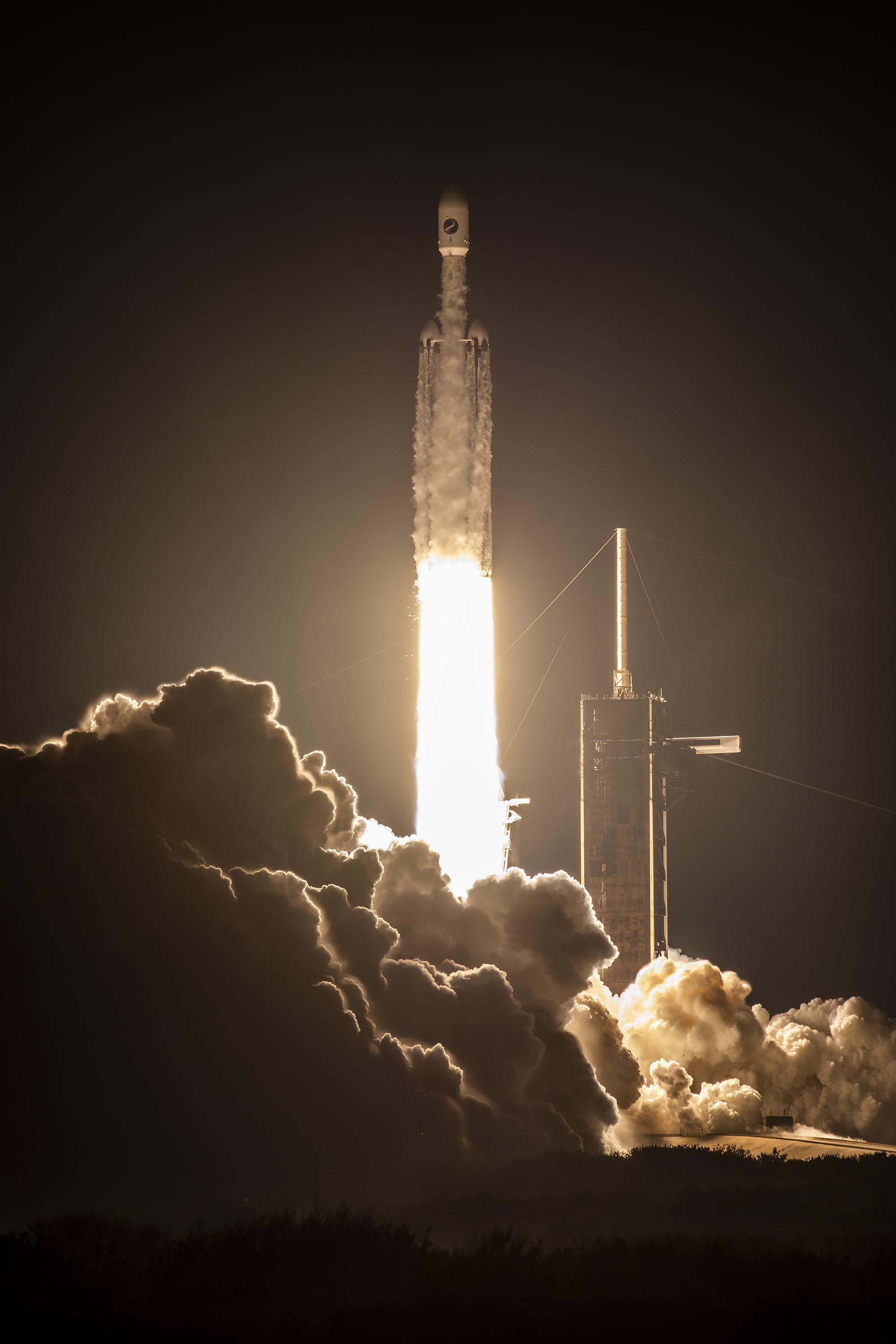
- Launch of OTV-7
- Mission type: Classified (in part)
- Operator: U.S. Space Force
- COSPAR ID: 2023-210A
- SATCAT no.: 58666
- Mission duration: 434 days, 6 hours and 15 minutes

Spacecraft properties
- Spacecraft type: Boeing X-37B
- Manufacturer: Boeing
- Launch mass: 6,350 kg (14,000 lb)
- Power: Deployable solar array, batteries

Start of mission
- Launch date: 29 December 2023, 01:07:00 UTC (December 28, 8:07 pm EST)
- Rocket: Falcon Heavy B1064-5, B1065-5 [sides], B1084 [core]
- Launch site: Kennedy, LC-39A
- Contractor: SpaceX

End of mission
- Landing date: 7 March 2025, 07:22 UTC (6 March, 11:22 pm PST)
- Landing site: Vandenberg, Runway 12

Orbital parameters
- Reference system: Highly elliptical high Earth orbit
- Perigee altitude: 323 km (201 mi)
- Apogee altitude: 38,838 km (24,133 mi)
- Inclination: 59.1°

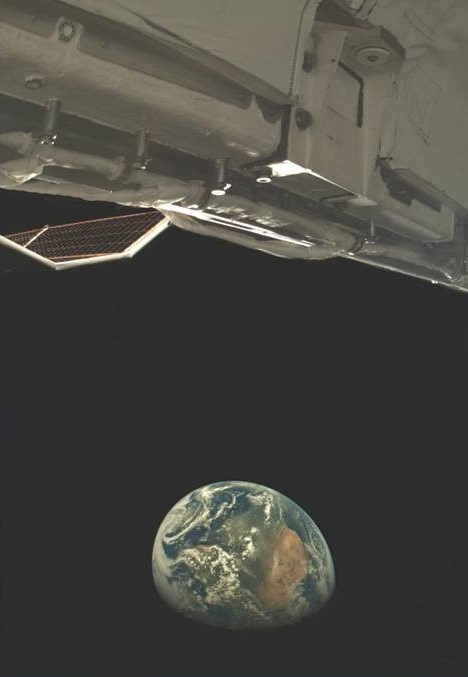
An X-37B onboard camera captures an image of Earth

Orbital Test Vehicle 7 (OTV-7), also referred to as United States Space Force-52 (USSF-52) or USA-349, is the fourth flight of the second Boeing X-37B, an American unmanned vertical-takeoff, horizontal-landing spaceplane. It was launched to a highly elliptical high Earth orbit aboard a Falcon Heavy rocket (for the first time) from LC-39A on 29 December 2023 at 01:07:00 UTC (December 28, 8:07 pm EST, local time at the launch site).

The spaceplane is operated by the Department of the Air Force Rapid Capabilities Office and United States Space Force, which considers the mission classified and as such has not revealed the objectives. The spaceplane was sent to orbit with a wide range of test and experimentation objectives. These tests include operating in new orbital regimes, experimenting with space domain awareness technologies and investigating the radiation effects to materials provided by NASA.

== Background and mission ==
OTV-7 is the fourth mission for the second X-37B built, and the seventh X-37B mission overall. It was flown on a Falcon Heavy in the expendable center core-recoverable side cores configuration, and launched from Kennedy Space Center Launch Complex 39A. It is the second classified flight of Falcon Heavy, awarded in June 2018. It is valued at US$130 million, increased to $149.2 million in August 2021, due to "a change in the contract requirements" and was expected to be completed by 14 April 2022. Draft solicitation said the launch was 6,350 kg (14,000 lb) to GTO. A month before launch, the Air Force announced that the mission would fly an X-37B spaceplane.

OTV-7 was deployed into a highly elliptical HEO orbit of 323 km (201 mi) x 38,838 km (24,133 mi) x 59.1° orbit.

In Oct 2024, OTV-7 was due to undertake aerobraking maneuvers to safely dispose of its service module.

On 20 February 2025, a photograph taken by an OTV onboard camera while in orbit was published, making it the first official publicly-released image from the program.

OTV-7 landed after 434 days at Vandenberg Space Force Base on 7 March 2025 at 07:22 UTC (6 March, 11:22 pm PST, local time at the landing site).

== Payloads and experiments ==
Onboard experiments include NASA's Seeds-2 experiment investigating the effects of space-based radiation on plant seeds during a long-duration spaceflight.

== See also ==
- OTV-1
- OTV-2
- OTV-3
- OTV-4
- OTV-5
- OTV-6
