= Boeing X-37 =

Reusable robotic spaceplane used by US military since 2010

X-37
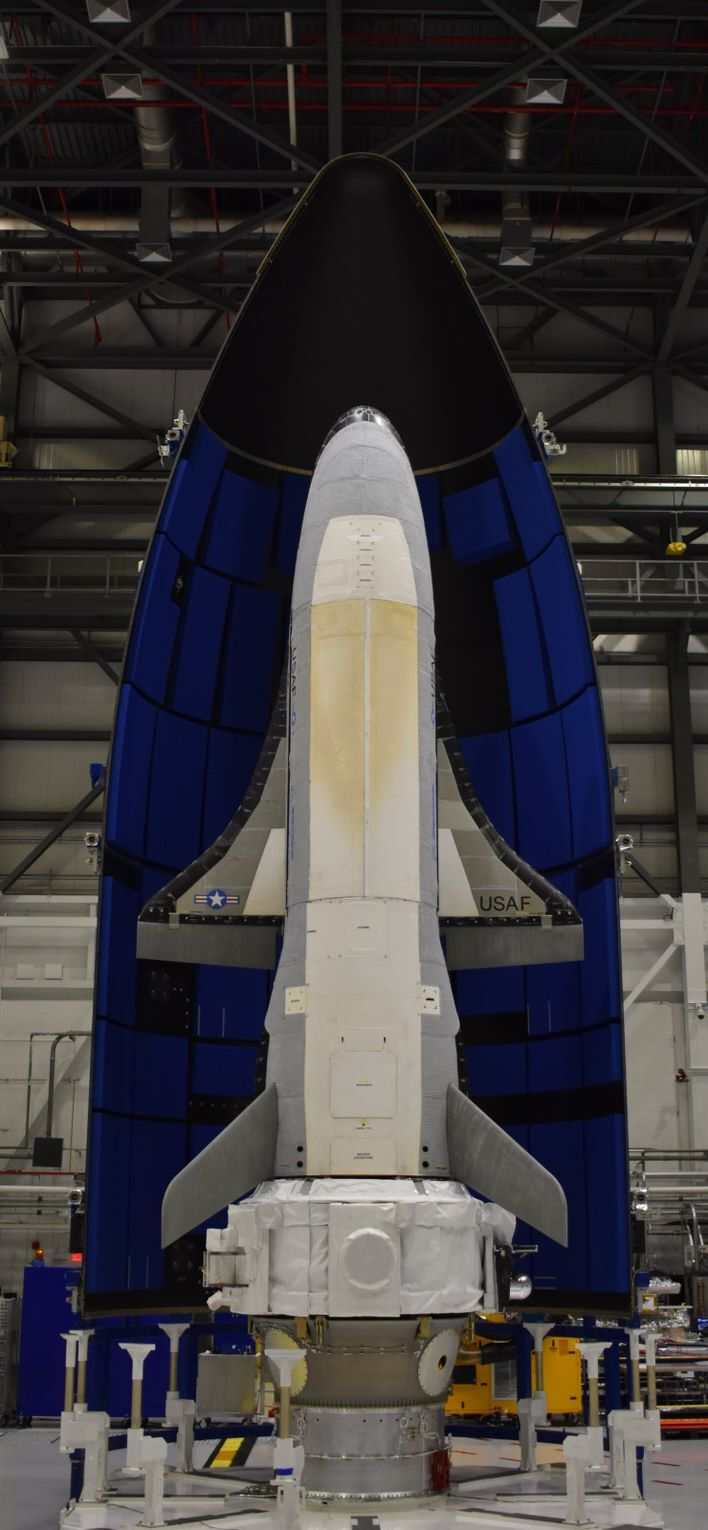
- X-37B with a service module being encapsulated inside a payload fairing ahead of the sixth mission

General information
- Type: Uncrewed spaceplane
- National origin: United States
- Manufacturer: Boeing
- Status: In service; 7 spaceflights completed
- Primary user: X-37A: NASA/DARPA; X-37B: United States Space Force/Department of the Air Force Rapid Capabilities Office
- Number built: X-37A: 1; X-37B: 2
- Flights: 7

History
- Introduction date: 22 April 2010 (first spaceflight)
- First flight: 7 April 2006 (first drop test)
- Developed from: Boeing X-40

The Boeing X-37, also known as the Orbital Test Vehicle (OTV), is a reusable robotic spacecraft. It is boosted into space by a launch vehicle, re-enters Earth's atmosphere, and lands as a spaceplane. The X-37 is operated by the Department of the Air Force Rapid Capabilities Office, in collaboration with the United States Space Force, for orbital spaceflight missions intended to demonstrate reusable space technologies. It is a 120-percent-scaled derivative of the earlier Boeing X-40. The X-37 began as a NASA project in 1999, before being transferred to the United States Department of Defense in 2004. Until 2019, the program was managed by Air Force Space Command.

An X-37 first flew during a drop test in 2006; its first orbital mission was launched in April 2010 on an Atlas V rocket, and returned to Earth in December 2010. Subsequent flights gradually extended the mission duration, reaching 780 days in orbit for the fifth mission, the first to launch on a Falcon 9 rocket. The sixth mission launched on an Atlas V on 17 May 2020 and concluded on 12 November 2022, reaching 908 days in orbit. The seventh mission launched on 28 December 2023 on a Falcon Heavy rocket, entering a highly elliptical high Earth orbit, landing in March 2025 after 434 days in orbit.

== Development ==
=== Origins ===
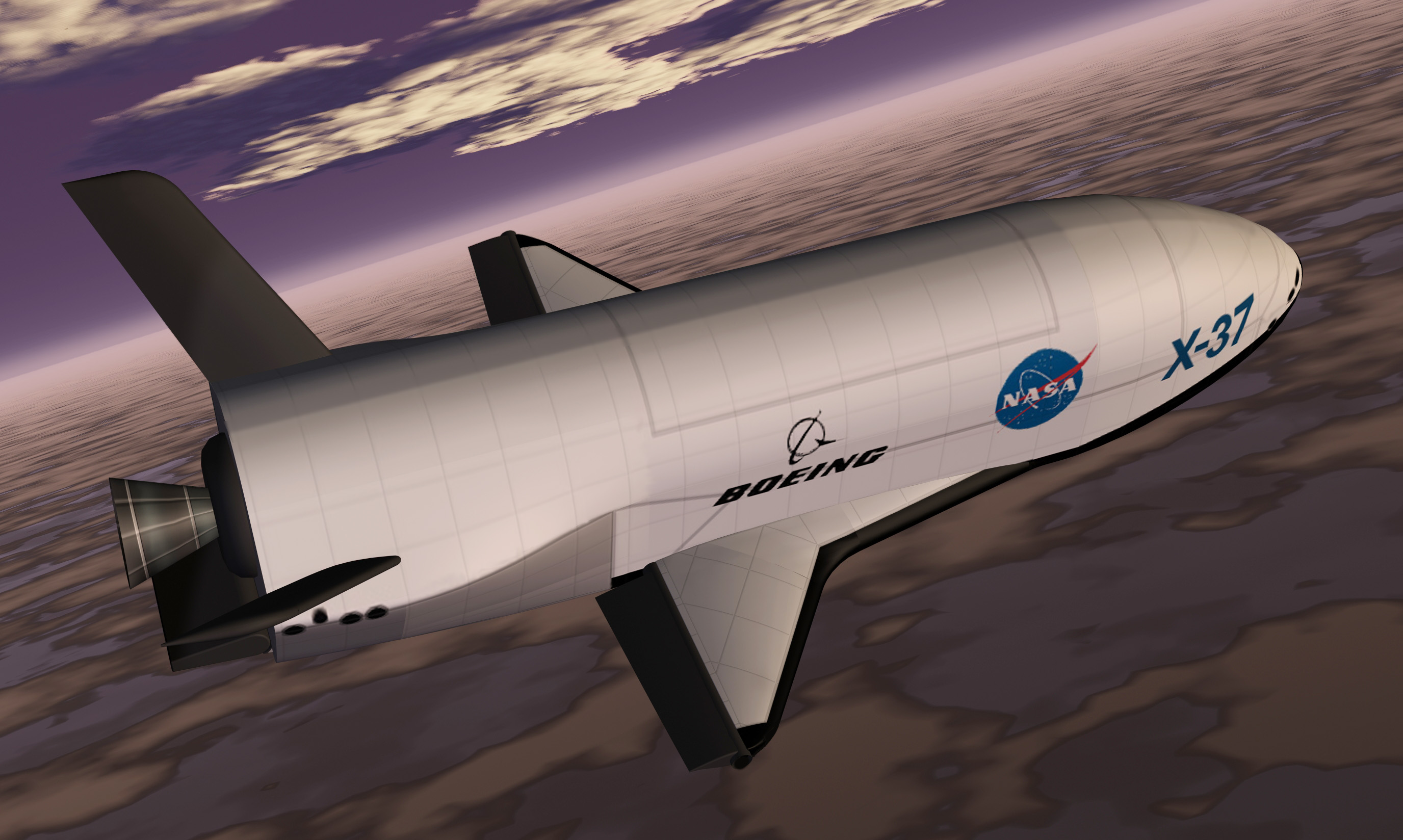
An artist's rendering of the X-37 spacecraft in 1999

In 1999, NASA selected Boeing Integrated Defense Systems to design and develop an orbital vehicle, built by the California branch of Boeing Phantom Works. Over four years, $192 million was spent on the project, with NASA contributing $109 million, the U.S. Air Force $16 million, and Boeing $67 million. In late 2002, a new $301 million contract was awarded to Boeing as part of NASA's Space Launch Initiative framework.

The aerodynamic design of the X-37 was derived from the larger Space Shuttle orbiter, hence the X-37 has a similar lift-to-drag ratio, and a lower cross range at higher altitudes and Mach numbers compared to DARPA's Hypersonic Technology Vehicle. An early requirement for the spacecraft called for a total mission delta-v of 7,000 miles per hour (11,000 km/h) for orbital maneuvers. An early goal for the program was for the X-37 to rendezvous with satellites and perform repairs. The X-37 was originally designed to be carried into orbit in the cargo bay of the Space Shuttle, but underwent redesign for launch on a Delta IV or comparable rocket after it was determined that a shuttle flight would be uneconomical.

The X-37 was transferred from NASA to the Defense Advanced Research Projects Agency (DARPA) on 13 September 2004. Thereafter, the program became a classified project because of its military applications. DARPA promoted the X-37 as part of the independent space policy that the U.S. Department of Defense has pursued since the 1986 Challenger disaster.

=== Glide testing ===
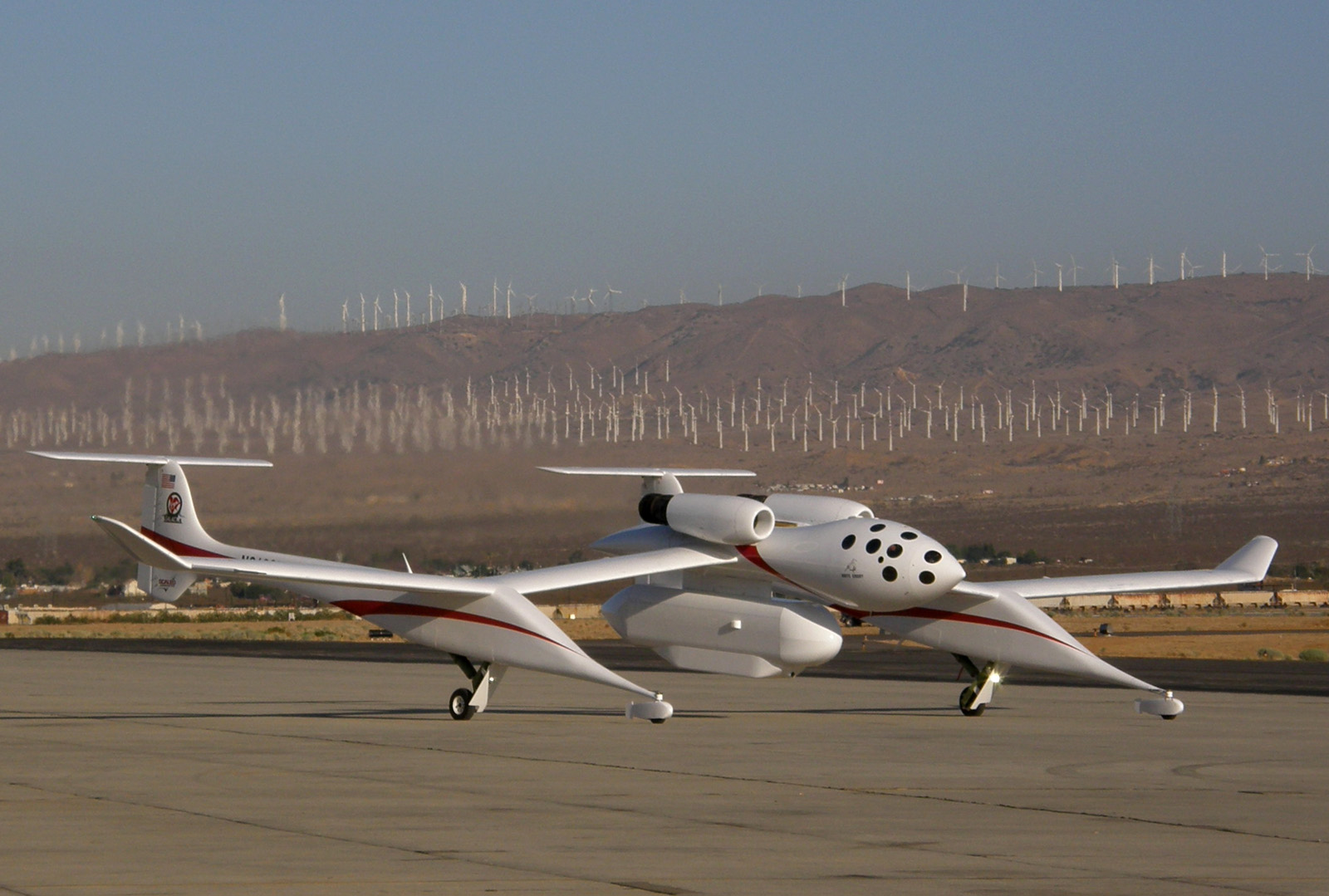
The Scaled Composites White Knight was used to launch the X-37A on glide tests (2007).

The X-37A vehicle that was used as an atmospheric drop test glider had no propulsion system. Instead of an operational vehicle's payload bay doors, it had an enclosed and reinforced upper fuselage structure to allow it to be mated with a mothership. In September 2004, DARPA announced that for its initial atmospheric drop tests the X-37A would be launched from the Scaled Composites White Knight, a high-altitude research aircraft.

On 21 June 2005, the X-37A completed a captive-carry flight underneath the White Knight from Mojave Spaceport in Mojave, California. Through the second half of 2005, the X-37A underwent structural upgrades, including the reinforcement of its nose wheel supports. The X-37A's public debut for its first free flight, scheduled for 10 March 2006, was canceled due to an Arctic storm. The next flight attempt, on 15 March 2006, was canceled due to high winds.

On 24 March 2006, the X-37A flew again but a datalink failure prevented a free flight and the vehicle returned to the ground still attached to its White Knight carrier aircraft. On 7 April 2006, the X-37A made its first free glide flight. During landing, the vehicle overran the runway and sustained minor damage. Following the vehicle's extended downtime for repairs, the program moved from Mojave to Air Force Plant 42 in Palmdale, California, for the remainder of the flight test program. White Knight continued to be based at Mojave, though it was ferried to Plant 42 when test flights were scheduled. Five additional flights were thought to have been performed, (Note: Source of flights: mission markings posted on side of White Knight aircraft) two of which resulted in X-37 releases with successful landings. These two free flights occurred on 18 August 2006 and 26 September 2006.

=== X-37B Orbital Test Vehicle ===
On 17 November 2006, the U.S. Air Force announced that it would develop its own variant of NASA's X-37A. The Air Force version was designated the X-37B Orbital Test Vehicle (OTV). The OTV program was built on earlier industry and government efforts by DARPA, NASA, and the Air Force under the leadership of the Air Force Rapid Capabilities Office in partnership with NASA and the Air Force Research Laboratory. Boeing was the prime contractor for the OTV program. The X-37B was designed to remain in orbit for up to 270 days at a time. The Secretary of the Air Force stated that the OTV program would focus on "risk reduction, experimentation, and operational concept development for reusable space vehicle technologies, in support of long-term developmental space objectives".

The X-37B was originally scheduled for launch in the payload bay of the Space Shuttle, but after the Space Shuttle Columbia disaster, it was transferred to a Delta II 7920. The X-37B was subsequently transferred to a shrouded configuration on the Atlas V rocket, due to concerns over the unshrouded spacecraft's aerodynamic properties during launch. Following their missions, X-37B spacecraft primarily land on a runway at Vandenberg Air Force Base, California, with Edwards Air Force Base as a secondary site. In 2010, manufacturing work began on the second X-37B, which conducted its maiden mission in March 2011.

On 8 October 2014, NASA confirmed that X-37B vehicles would be housed at Kennedy Space Center in Orbiter Processing Facilities (OPF) 1 and 2, hangars previously occupied by the Space Shuttle. Boeing had said the space planes would use OPF-1 in January 2014, and the Air Force had previously said it was considering consolidating X-37B operations, housed at Vandenberg Air Force Base in California, nearer to their launch site at Cape Canaveral, Florida. NASA also stated that the program had completed tests to determine whether the X-37B, one-fourth the size of the Space Shuttle, could land on the former Shuttle runways. NASA furthermore stated that renovations of the two hangars would be completed by the end of 2014; the main doors of OPF-1 were marked with the message "Home of the X-37B" by this point.

==== Speculation regarding purpose ====
Most of the activities of the X-37B project are secret. The official Air Force statement is that the project is "an experimental test program to demonstrate technologies for a reliable, reusable, uncrewed space test platform for the U.S. Air Force". The primary objectives of the X-37B are twofold: reusable spacecraft technology and operating experiments, which can be returned to Earth. The Air Force states that this includes testing avionics, flight systems, guidance and navigation, thermal protection, insulation, propulsion, and re-entry systems.

In May 2010, Tom Burghardt speculated on Space Daily that the X-37B could be used as a spy satellite or to deliver weapons from space. The Pentagon subsequently denied claims that the X-37B's test missions supported the development of space-based weapons. In January 2012, allegations were made that the X-37B was being used to spy on China's Tiangong-1 space station module. Former U.S. Air Force orbital analyst Brian Weeden later rejected this claim, emphasizing that the different orbits of the two spacecraft precluded any practical surveillance flybys.

In October 2014, The Guardian reported the claims of security experts that the X-37B was being used "to test reconnaissance and spy sensors, particularly how they hold up against radiation and other hazards of orbit". In November 2016, the International Business Times speculated that the U.S. government was testing a version of the EmDrive electromagnetic microwave thruster on the fourth flight of the X-37B. In 2009, an EmDrive technology transfer contract with Boeing was undertaken via a State Department TAA and a UK export license, approved by the UK Ministry of Defence. Boeing has since stated that it is no longer pursuing this area of research. The U.S. Air Force has stated that the X-37B is testing a Hall-effect thruster system for Aerojet Rocketdyne.

In July 2019, former United States Secretary of the Air Force Heather Wilson explained that when an X-37B was in an elliptic orbit it could, at perigee, use the thin atmosphere to make an orbit change preventing some observers from discovering the new orbit for a while, permitting secret activities.

=== Processing ===
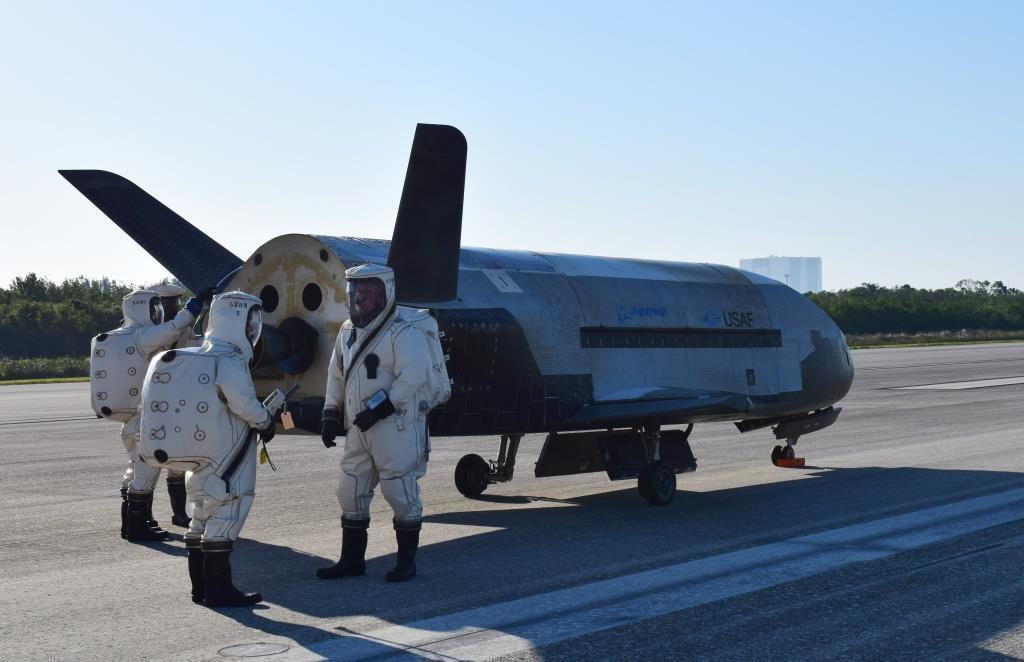
X-37B 2 sits on the Shuttle Landing Facility after the OTV-4 mission, with ground crew wearing protective suits.

Processing for the X-37 is carried out inside Bays 1 and 2 of the Orbiter Processing Facility (OPF) at Kennedy Space Center in Florida, where the vehicle is loaded with its payload. The X-37 is then placed inside a fairing along with its stage adapter and transported to the launch site. Previous launch sites have included SLC-41 and Kennedy Space Center LC-39A.

Landing is at one of three sites across the US: the Shuttle Landing Facility at Kennedy Space Center, Vandenberg Space Force Base, or Edwards Air Force Base. To return to Kennedy Space Center, the X-37 is placed into a payload canister and loaded into a Boeing C-17 cargo plane. Once at Kennedy, the X-37 is unloaded and towed to the OPF, where it is prepared for its next flight. Technicians must wear protective suits due to toxic hypergolic gases.

== Design ==
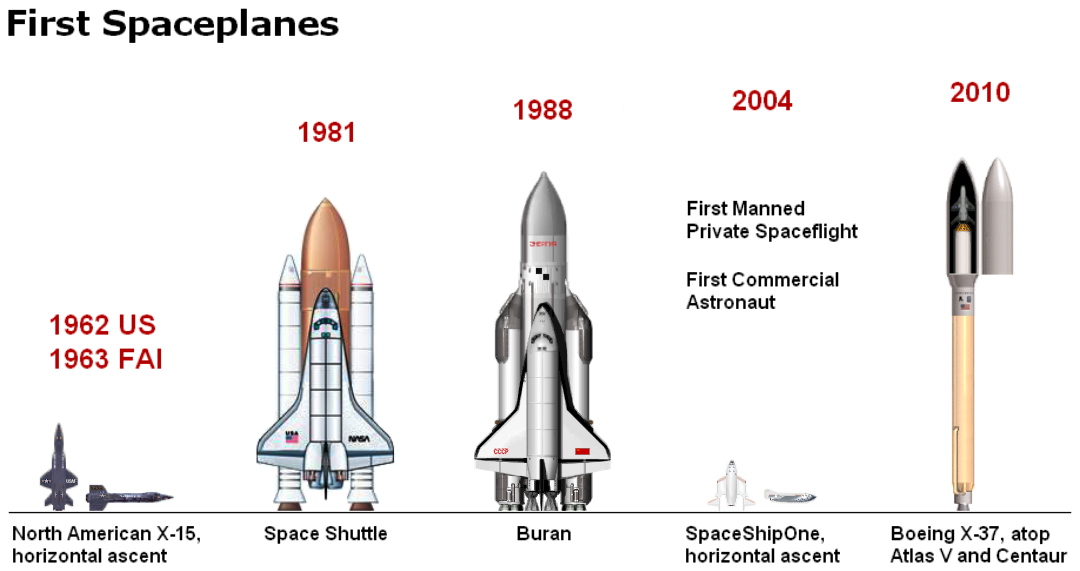
The X-37 (far right) is the smallest and lightest orbital spaceplane yet flown. Both the North American X-15 and SpaceShipOne were suborbital. Of the spaceplanes shown, only the X-37 and Buran conducted uncrewed spaceflights.

The X-37 Orbital Test Vehicle is a reusable robotic spaceplane. It is an approximately 120-percent-scale derivative of the Boeing X-40, measuring over 29 feet (8.8 m) in length, and features two angled tail fins. The X-37 launches atop an Atlas V 501 or a SpaceX Falcon 9 or Falcon Heavy rocket. The spaceplane is designed to operate in a speed range of up to Mach 25 on its reentry.

The technologies demonstrated in the X-37 include an improved thermal protection system, enhanced avionics, an autonomous guidance system and an advanced airframe. The spaceplane's thermal protection system is built upon previous generations of atmospheric reentry spacecraft, incorporating silica ceramic tiles. The X-37's avionics suite was used by Boeing to develop its CST-100 crewed spacecraft. The development of the X-37 was to "aid in the design and development of NASA's Orbital Space Plane, designed to provide a crew rescue and crew transport capability to and from the International Space Station", according to a NASA fact sheet.

The X-37 for NASA was to be powered by one Aerojet AR2-3 engine using storable propellants, providing thrust of 6,600 pounds-force (29.4 kN). The human-rated AR2-3 engine had been used on the dual-power NF-104A astronaut training vehicle and was given a new flight certification for use on the X-37 with hydrogen peroxide/JP-8 propellants. This was reportedly changed to a hypergolic nitrogen-tetroxide/hydrazine propulsion system. The X-37 lands automatically upon returning from orbit and is the third reusable spacecraft to have such a capability, after the Soviet Buran shuttle and the U.S. space shuttle, which had automatic landing capability by the mid-1990s, but never tested it. The X-37 is the smallest and lightest orbital spaceplane flown to date; it has a launch mass of around 11,000 pounds (5,000 kg) and is approximately one quarter the size of the Space Shuttle orbiter.

On 13 April 2015, the Space Foundation awarded the X-37 team with the 2015 Space Achievement Award "for significantly advancing the state of the art for reusable spacecraft and on-orbit operations, with the design, development, test and orbital operation of the X-37B space flight vehicle over three missions totaling 1,367 days in space".

== Operational history ==
The two operational X-37Bs have completed seven orbital missions; they have spent a combined 4,208.66 days (11.53 years) in space.

Flight	Vehicle	Launch site	Launch date	Landing date	Launcher	Mission	Duration	Notes	Status
OTV-1	1	Cape Canaveral, SLC-41	22 April 2010; 23:52 UTC	3 December 2010; 09:16 UTC	Atlas V 501	USA-212	224 days, 9 hours, 24 minutes	First launch of Atlas V 501 configuration; First American autonomous orbital runway landing; First X-37B flight; Landed at Vandenberg AFB Runway 12	Success
OTV-2	2	Cape Canaveral, SLC-41	5 March 2011; 22:46 UTC	16 June 2012; 12:48 UTC	Atlas V 501	USA-226	468 days, 14 hours, 2 minutes	First flight of second X-37B; Landed at Vandenberg AFB Runway 12	Success
OTV-3	1	Cape Canaveral, SLC-41	11 December 2012; 18:03 UTC	17 October 2014; 16:24 UTC	Atlas V 501	USA-240	674 days, 22 hours, 21 minutes	Second flight of first X-37B; Landed at Vandenberg AFB Runway 12	Success
OTV-4	2	Cape Canaveral, SLC-41	20 May 2015; 15:05 UTC	7 May 2017; 11:47 UTC	Atlas V 501	USA-261 (AFSPC-5)	717 days, 20 hours, 42 minutes	Second flight of second X-37B; First landing on the Shuttle Landing Facility Runway 15 at Kennedy Space Center	Success
OTV-5	2	Kennedy, LC-39A	7 September 2017; 14:00 UTC	27 October 2019; 07:51 UTC	Falcon 9 Block 4	USA-277	779 days, 17 hours, 51 minutes	Third flight of second X-37B; First launch of an X-37B on SpaceX's Falcon 9 vehicle; Landed at Shuttle Landing Facility Runway 33	Success
OTV-6	1	Cape Canaveral, SLC-41	17 May 2020; 13:14 UTC	12 November 2022; 10:22 UTC	Atlas V 501	USA-299 (USSF-7)	908 days, 21 hours, 8 minutes	Third flight of first X-37B; Carried most experiments to date; First X-37B launch by USSF; Longest X-37B mission; Landed at Shuttle Landing Facility Runway 33	Success
OTV-7	2	Kennedy, LC-39A	29 December 2023; 01:07 UTC	7 March 2025; 07:22 UTC	Falcon Heavy	USA-349 (USSF-52)	434 days, 6 hours, 15 minutes	First launch of an X-37B on SpaceX Falcon Heavy; Fourth flight of second X-37B; First spaceplane beyond low earth orbit in a highly elliptical, high Earth orbit; Landed at Vandenberg SFB Runway 12	Success
OTV-8	1	Kennedy, LC-39A	22 August 2025; 03:50 UTC		Falcon 9 Block 5	USA-555 (USSF-36)	452 days, 12 hours, 58 minutes	Fourth flight of first X-37B; First launch of an X-37B on SpaceX's Falcon 9 Block 5.	Success

=== OTV-1 ===
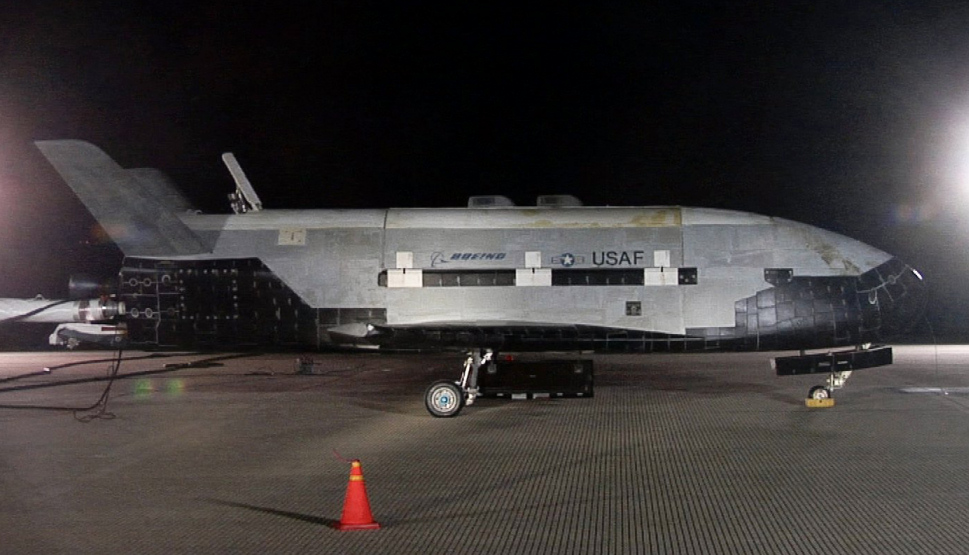
X-37B 1 sits on the runway after landing at Vandenberg SFB at the end of its OTV-1 (USA-212) mission on 3 December 2010.

The first X-37B launched on its first mission–OTV-1/USA-212–on an Atlas V rocket from Cape Canaveral SLC-41 on 22 April 2010 at 23:52 UTC. The spacecraft was placed into low Earth orbit for testing. While the U.S. Air Force revealed few orbital details of the mission, a worldwide network of amateur astronomers claimed to have identified the spacecraft in orbit. On 22 May 2010, the spacecraft was in an inclination of 39.99°, circling the Earth once every 90 minutes on an orbit 249 by 262 miles (401 by 422 km). OTV-1 reputedly passed over the same given spot on Earth every four days, and operated at an altitude that is typical for military surveillance satellites. Such an orbit is also common among civilian LEO satellites, and the spaceplane's altitude was the same as that of the ISS and most other crewed spacecraft.

The U.S. Air Force announced a 3–6 December landing on 30 November 2010. As scheduled, the X-37B was de-orbited, reentered Earth's atmosphere, and landed successfully at Vandenberg SFB on 3 December 2010, at 09:16 UTC, conducting the first US autonomous orbital landing onto a runway. This was the first such landing since the Soviet Buran shuttle in 1988. In all, OTV-1 spent 224 days and 9 hours in space. OTV-1 suffered a tire blowout during landing and sustained minor damage to its underside.

=== OTV-2 ===
The second X-37B launched on its inaugural mission, designated OTV-2/USA-226, aboard an Atlas V rocket from Cape Canaveral SLC-41 on 5 March 2011 at 22:46 UTC. The mission was classified and described by the U.S. military as an effort to test new space technologies. On 29 November 2011, the U.S. Air Force announced that it would extend USA-226 beyond the 270-day baseline duration. In April 2012, General William L. Shelton of the Air Force Space Command declared the ongoing mission a "spectacular success".

On 30 May 2012, the Air Force stated that the X-37B would land at Vandenberg AFB in June 2012. The spacecraft landed autonomously on 16 June 2012, having spent 468 days and 14 hours in space.

=== OTV-3 ===
The third mission and second flight of the first X-37B, OTV-3 was originally scheduled to launch on 25 October 2012, but was postponed because of an engine issue with the Atlas V launch vehicle. It was successfully launched from Cape Canaveral SLC-41 on 11 December 2012 at 18:03 UTC. Once in orbit, the spacecraft was designated USA-240. Landing occurred at Vandenberg AFB on 17 October 2014 at 16:24 UTC, after a total time in orbit of 674 days and 22 hours.

=== OTV-4 ===
The fourth X-37B mission, OTV-4, was codenamed AFSPC-5 and designated as USA-261 in orbit. It was the second flight of the second X-37B vehicle. The X-37B launched on an Atlas V rocket from Cape Canaveral SLC-41 on 20 May 2015 at 15:05 UTC. Objectives included a test of Aerojet Rocketdyne's XR-5A Hall-effect thruster in support of the Advanced Extremely High Frequency communications satellite program, and a NASA investigation on the performance of various materials in space for at least 200 days. The vehicle spent what was then a record-breaking 717 days and 20 hours in orbit before landing at Kennedy Space Center's Shuttle Landing Facility on 7 May 2017 at 11:47 UTC.

=== OTV-5 ===
The fifth X-37B mission, designated USA-277 in orbit, was launched from Kennedy Space Center Launch Complex 39A on 7 September 2017 at 14:00 UTC, just before the arrival of Hurricane Irma. The launch vehicle was a Falcon 9 rocket, and a number of small satellites also shared the ride. The spacecraft was inserted at a higher inclination orbit than previous missions, further expanding the X-37B's envelope. During the flight, the spacecraft modified its orbit using an on-board propulsion system. While the complete payload for OTV-5 is classified, the Air Force announced that one experiment flying is the Advanced Structurally Embedded Thermal Spreader II (ASETS-II), which measures the performance of an oscillating heat pipe. The mission was completed with the vehicle landing at the Shuttle Landing Facility on 27 October 2019 at 07:51 UTC.

=== OTV-6 ===
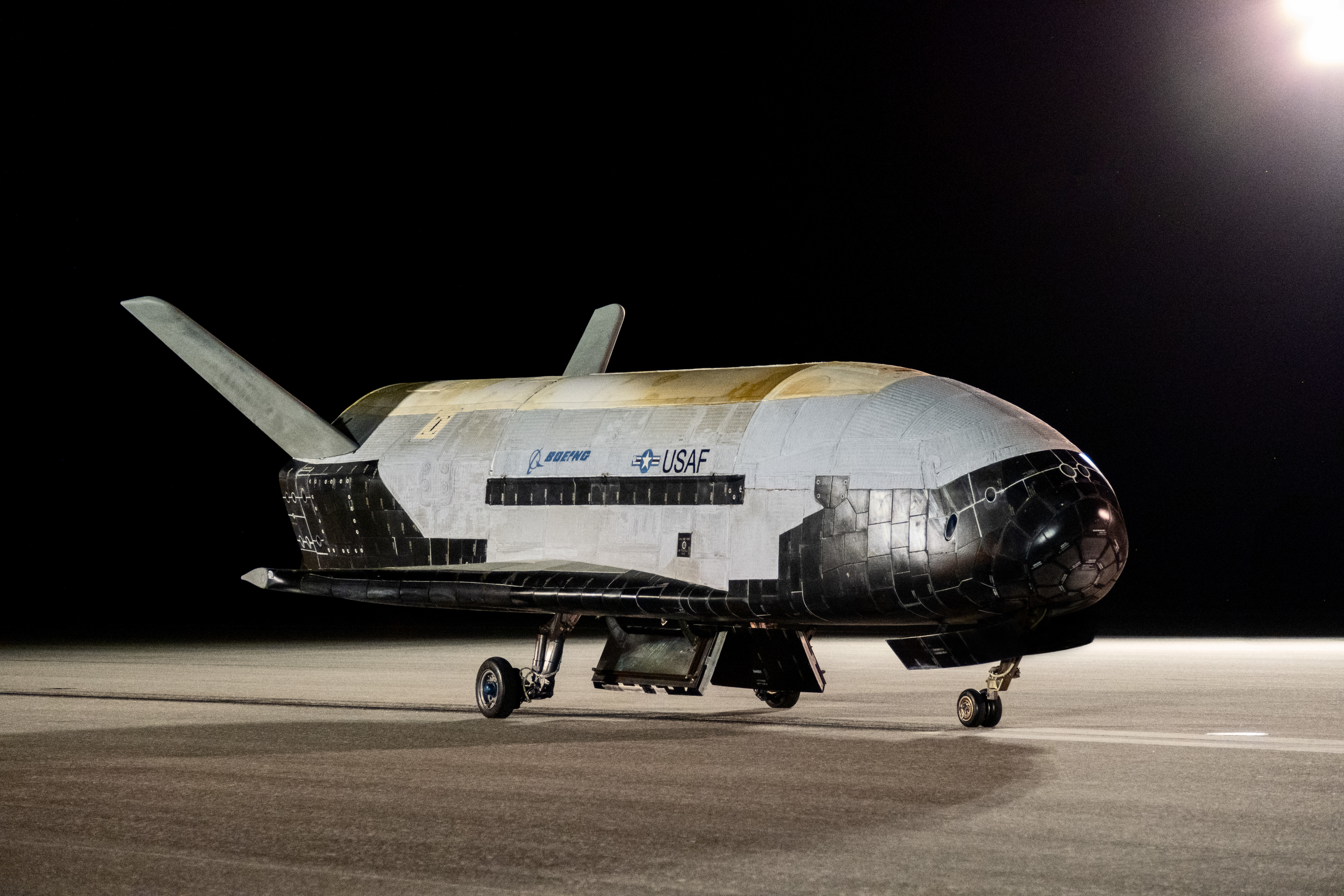
X-37B 1 sits on the runway after landing at the Shuttle Landing Facility at KSC on 12 November 2022, the 909th day of the OTV-6 (USA-299) mission

The sixth X-37B mission (OTV-6), U.S. Space Force 7 (formerly known as AFSPC 7), launched on an Atlas V 501 rocket from Cape Canaveral SLC-41 on 17 May 2020 at 13:14:00 UTC. This mission is the first time the spaceplane has carried a service module, a ring attached to the rear of the vehicle for hosting multiple experiments. The mission hosts more experiments than prior X-37B flights, including two NASA experiments. One is a sample plate evaluating the reaction of select materials to conditions in space. The second studies the effect of ambient space radiation on seeds. A third experiment designed by the Naval Research Laboratory (NRL) transforms solar power into radio frequency microwave energy, then studies transmitting that energy to Earth. The X-37B remains a Department of the Air Force asset, but the newly established U.S. Space Force is responsible for the launch, on-orbit operations, and landing.

The X-37B released a small, 136 kg (300 lb) satellite named FalconSat-8 (USA-300) around 28 May 2020. Developed by United States Air Force Academy cadets in partnership with the Air Force Research Laboratory (AFRL), the small satellite carries five experimental payloads. The spacecraft will test a novel electromagnetic propulsion system, low-weight antenna technology and a commercial reaction wheel to provide attitude control in orbit. According to the U.S. Air Force Academy, FalconSat-8's experiments include:

- Magnetogradient Electrostatic Plasma Thruster (MEP) – Novel electromagnetic propulsion system
- MetaMaterial Antenna (MMA) – Low size, weight, power antenna with phased array-like performance
- Carbon nanotube experiment (CANOE) – RF cabling with carbon nanotube braiding flexed using shape-memory alloy
- Attitude Control and Energy Storage (ACES) – Commercial reaction wheel modified into a flywheel for energy storage and release
- SkyPad – Off-the-shelf cameras and GPUs integrated into low-SWAP (size, weight and power) package

The mission was completed with the vehicle landing at the Shuttle Landing Facility on 12 November 2022 at 10:22 UTC.

=== OTV-7 ===
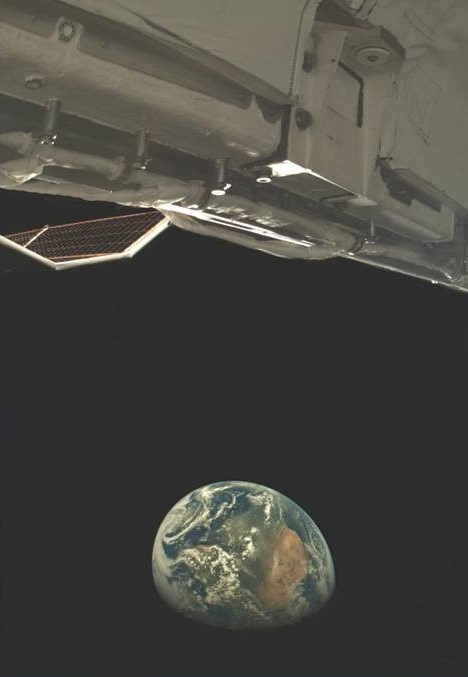
An X-37B onboard camera captures an image of Earth while conducting experiments in a highly elliptical orbit in 2024.

The fourth flight of second X-37B and seventh overall X-37B mission was planned to be launched on SpaceX's Falcon Heavy on 12 December 2023. It was rescheduled for 28 December 2023, when it was successfully launched at 8:07 pm EST (01:07:00 UTC on 29 December). The orbit is higher than any spaceplane, in a highly elliptical HEO orbit. In October 2024, OTV-7 was due to undertake aerobraking maneuvers to safely dispose of its service module. The mission ended with landing at Vandenberg Space Force Base on 7 March 2025 at 07:22 UTC.

=== OTV-8 ===
The eighth flight of the X-37B (OTV-8) launched on 21 August 2025 from Kennedy Space Center, Florida on a SpaceX Falcon 9. According to the U.S. Space Force, the mission includes testing laser communications and a quantum inertial sensor.

== Variants ==
=== X-37A ===
The X-37A Approach and Landing Test Vehicle (ALTV) was an initial NASA version of the spacecraft used in drop glide tests in 2005 and 2006.

=== X-37B ===
The X-37B is a modified version of the NASA X-37A, built for the U.S. Air Force. Two have been built and used for multiple orbital missions.

=== X-37C ===
In 2011, Boeing announced plans for a scaled-up variant of the X-37B, referring to it as the X-37C. This spacecraft was planned to be between 165% and 180% of the size of the X-37B, allowing it to transport up to six astronauts inside a pressurized compartment housed in the cargo bay. The Atlas V was this variant's proposed launch vehicle. In this role, Boeing's X-37C could potentially compete with the corporation's CST-100 Starliner commercial space capsule. As of 2024, with NASA selecting Starliner and SpaceX Crew Dragon, there has been no further announcement to develop X-37C.

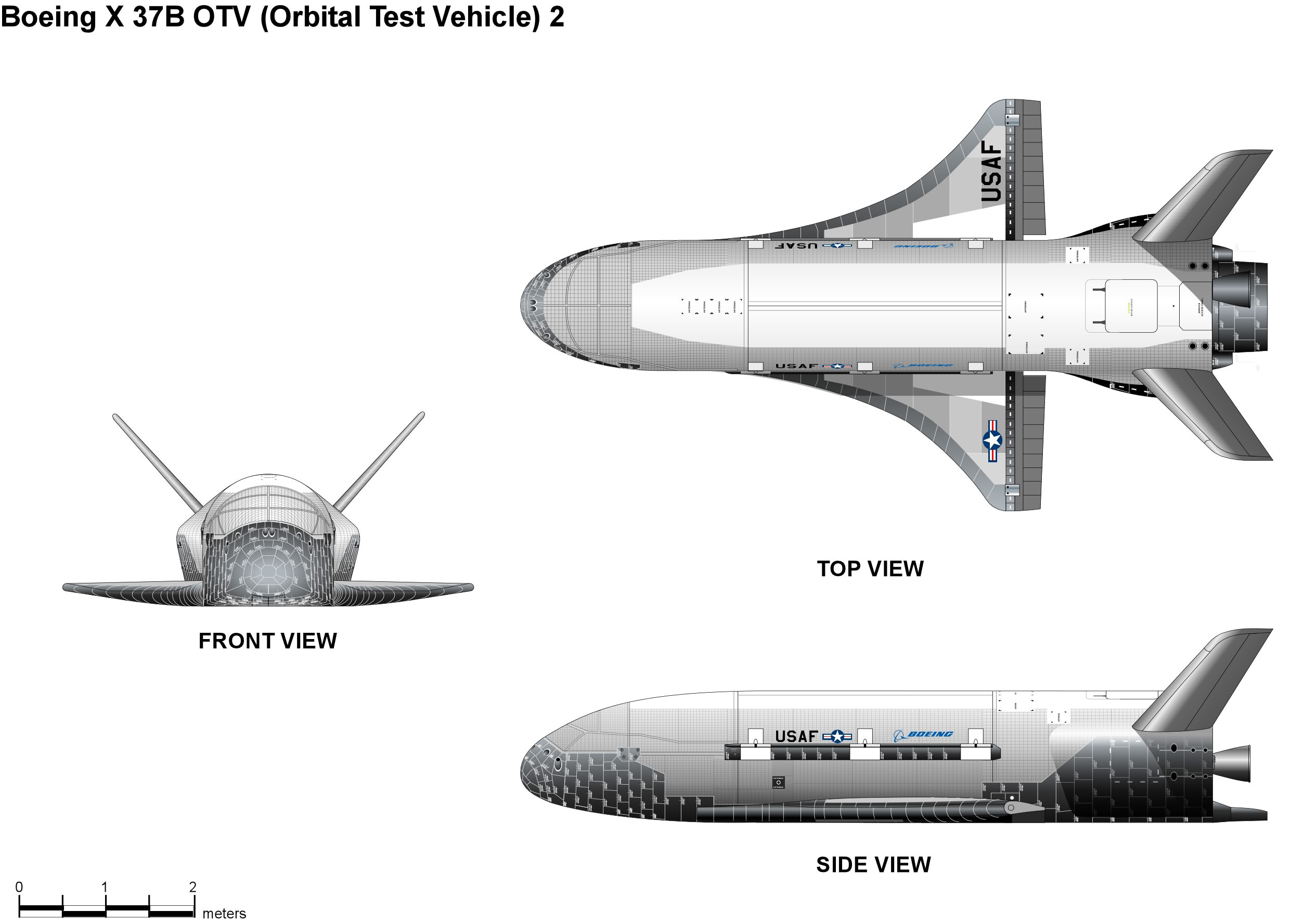
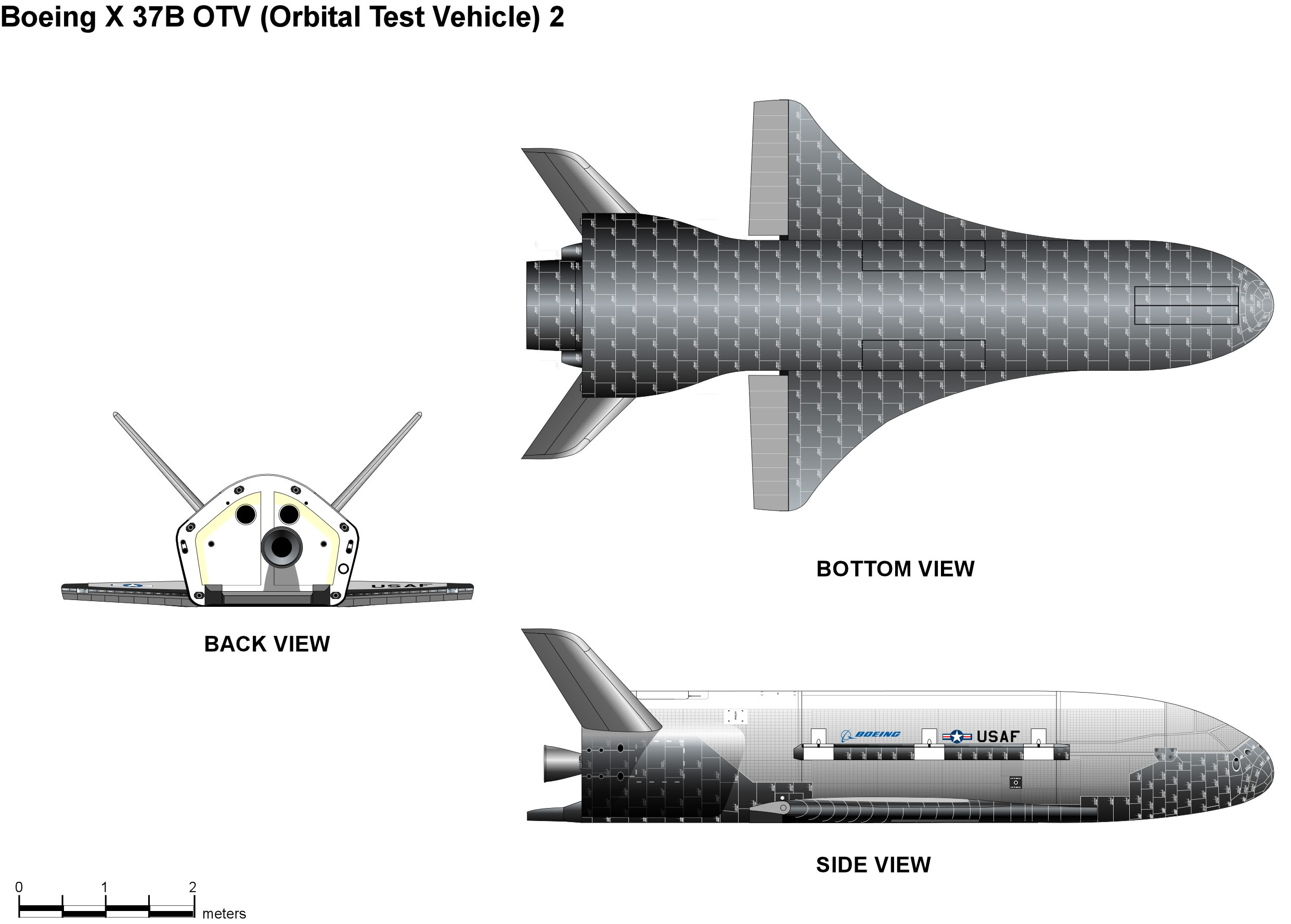
Three-view plans of the X-37B

== Specifications (X-37B) ==
Data from USAF, Boeing, Air & Space Magazine, and Phys.org

General characteristics

- Crew: none
- Capacity: 227 kg
- Length: 29 ft 3 in (8.92 m)
- Wingspan: 14 ft 11 in (4.55 m)
- Height: 9 ft 6 in (2.90 m)
- Max takeoff weight: 11,000 lb (4,990 kg)
- Electrical power: Gallium arsenide solar cells with lithium-ion batteries
- Payload bay: 7 × 4 ft (2.1 × 1.2 m)

Performance

- Orbital speed: 17,426 mph (28,044 km/h)
- Orbit: Low Earth orbit to high Earth orbit
- Orbital time: 270 days (design) (Note: This figure is based on pre-launch design estimates; it does not reflect the spacecraft's actual performance capacity.) 908 days (demonstrated)

== See also ==
- Boeing X-20 Dyna-Soar, the U.S. Air Force's original (1958–1963) spaceplane program, cancelled before craft was constructed
- Chinese reusable experimental spacecraft, a reusable spaceplane under development
- Collier Trophy
- Dream Chaser, a lifting-body spaceplane being developed by Sierra Nevada Corporation
- Hermes (spacecraft), a proposed European Space Agency (ESA) spacecraft design
- HOPE-X, a similar-sized vehicle of comparable role by JAXA (cancelled)
- HYFLEX, a Japanese lifting body spaceplane in 1996, precursor to HOPE-X
- Intermediate eXperimental Vehicle (IXV), an ESA designed experimental reentry vehicle
- List of USA satellites
- List of X-planes
- Orbital Sciences X-34, a proposed uncrewed suborbital reusable-rocket technology testbed
- RLV Technology Demonstration Programme, Indian reusable spaceplane development project
- Shenlong (spacecraft), a Chinese reusable robotic spaceplane under development, first tested in 2011 (suborbital flight)
- Skylon (spacecraft), a British reusable uncrewed spaceplane (cancelled)
- Space Rider, a planned robotic spaceplane follow-up to IXV by the ESA

== Sources ==
- Miller, Jay (2001). The X-Planes: X-1 to X-45. Hinckley, UK: Midland. ISBN 978-1-85780-109-5.
- Yenne, Bill (2005). The Story of the Boeing Company. Minneapolis, Minnesota: Zenith. ISBN 978-0-7603-2333-5.
