= OTV-6 =

Longest flight of the first X-37B

USA-299
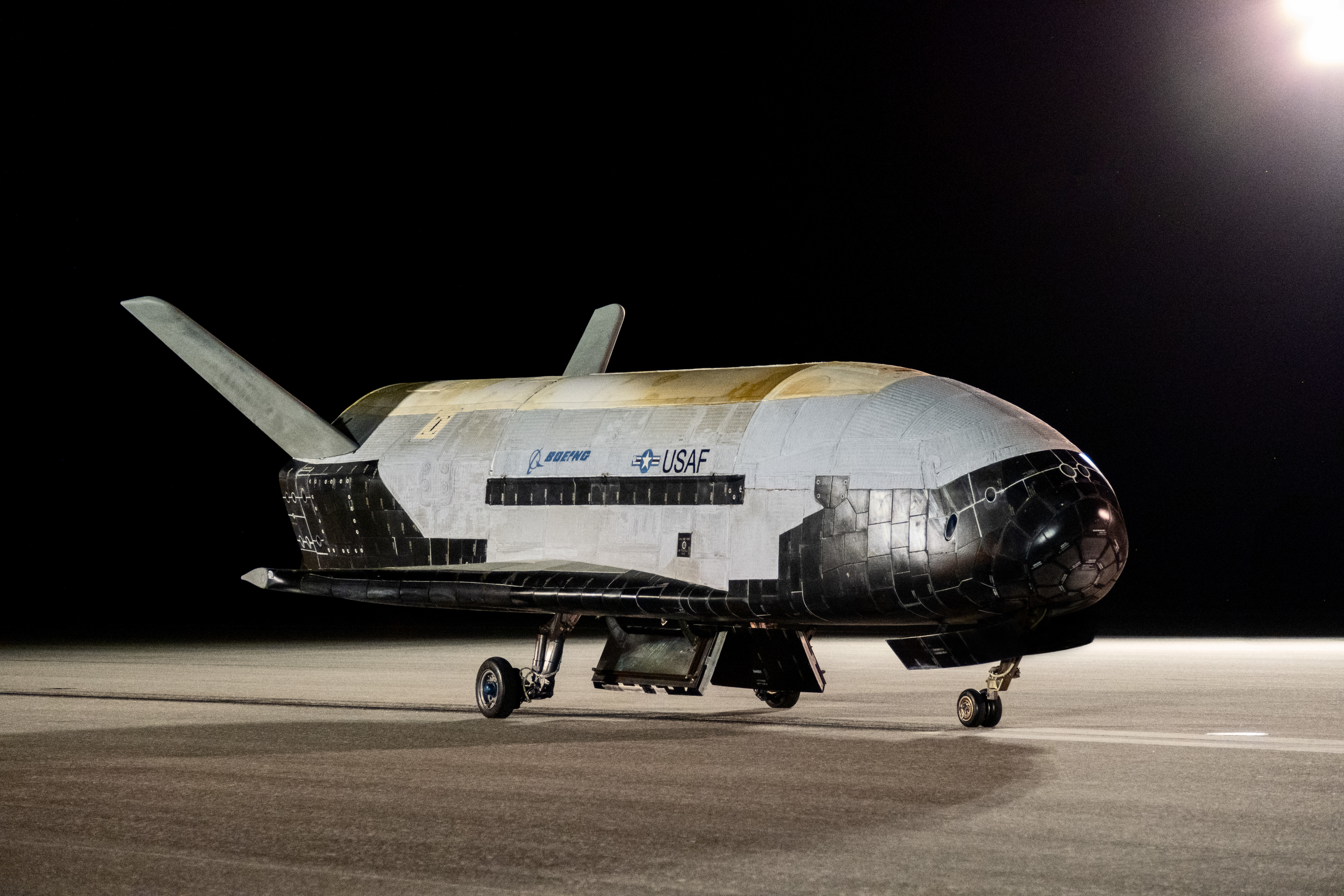
- X-37B that conducted OTV-6 shortly after it landed on 12 November 2022
- Names: Orbital Test Vehicle 6 OTV-6
- Mission type: U.S. Space Force classified satellite
- Operator: United States Space Force
- COSPAR ID: 2020-029A
- SATCAT no.: 45606
- Mission duration: 908 days, 21 hours and 8 minutes

Spacecraft properties
- Spacecraft type: Boeing X-37B
- Manufacturer: Boeing
- Launch mass: 5,400 kg (11,900 lb)
- Power: Deployable solar array, batteries

Start of mission
- Launch date: 17 May 2020, 13:14:00 UTC
- Rocket: Atlas V 501 (AV-081)
- Launch site: Cape Canaveral, SLC-41
- Contractor: United Launch Alliance

End of mission
- Landing date: 12 November 2022, 10:22 UTC
- Landing site: Shuttle Landing Facility Runway 33

Orbital parameters
- Reference system: Geocentric orbit
- Regime: Low Earth orbit
- Perigee altitude: 388 km (241 mi)
- Apogee altitude: 404 km (251 mi)
- Inclination: 44.60°

USA-299, also referred to as USSF-7 and Orbital Test Vehicle 6 (OTV-6), is the third flight of the first Boeing X-37B, an American unmanned vertical-takeoff, horizontal-landing spaceplane. It was launched to low Earth orbit aboard an Atlas V launch vehicle from SLC-41 on 17 May 2020. Its mission designation is part of the USA series.

The spaceplane is operated by the Department of the Air Force Rapid Capabilities Office and United States Space Force, which considers the mission classified and as such has not revealed the objectives. However an unclassified secondary satellite, FalconSat-8, was deployed from the X-37B soon after launch.

== Mission ==
OTV-6 is the third mission for the first X-37B built, and the sixth X-37B mission overall. It flew on an Atlas V in the 501 configuration, and launched from Cape Canaveral Space Launch Complex 41. This flight is the first time the space plane has been equipped with a service module to carry additional pieces for experiments.

OTV-6 was deployed into an orbit with an inclination of approximately 44.60°.

OTV-6 landed after a record-breaking 908 days at the Shuttle Landing Facility on November 12, 2022.

== FalconSat-8 ==
A rideshare payload for the United States Air Force Academy, FalconSat-8, was deployed from the X-37B a few days into the mission. The satellite provides a platform for the academy's Cadet Space Operations Squadron to test various technologies.

Onboard experiments include:

- MEP (Magnetic gradient Electrostatic Plasma thruster), a novel electromagnetic propulsion system
- MMA (Metamaterial antenna), a low power, high performance antenna
- CANOE (CArbon NanOtubes Experiment)
- ACES (Attitude Control and Energy Storage), a commercial reaction wheel modified into a flywheel
- SkyPad, off-the-shelf cameras and GPUs integrated into a low power package

== See also ==
- USA-212
- USA-226
