= OTV-4 =

Rocket flight

USA-261
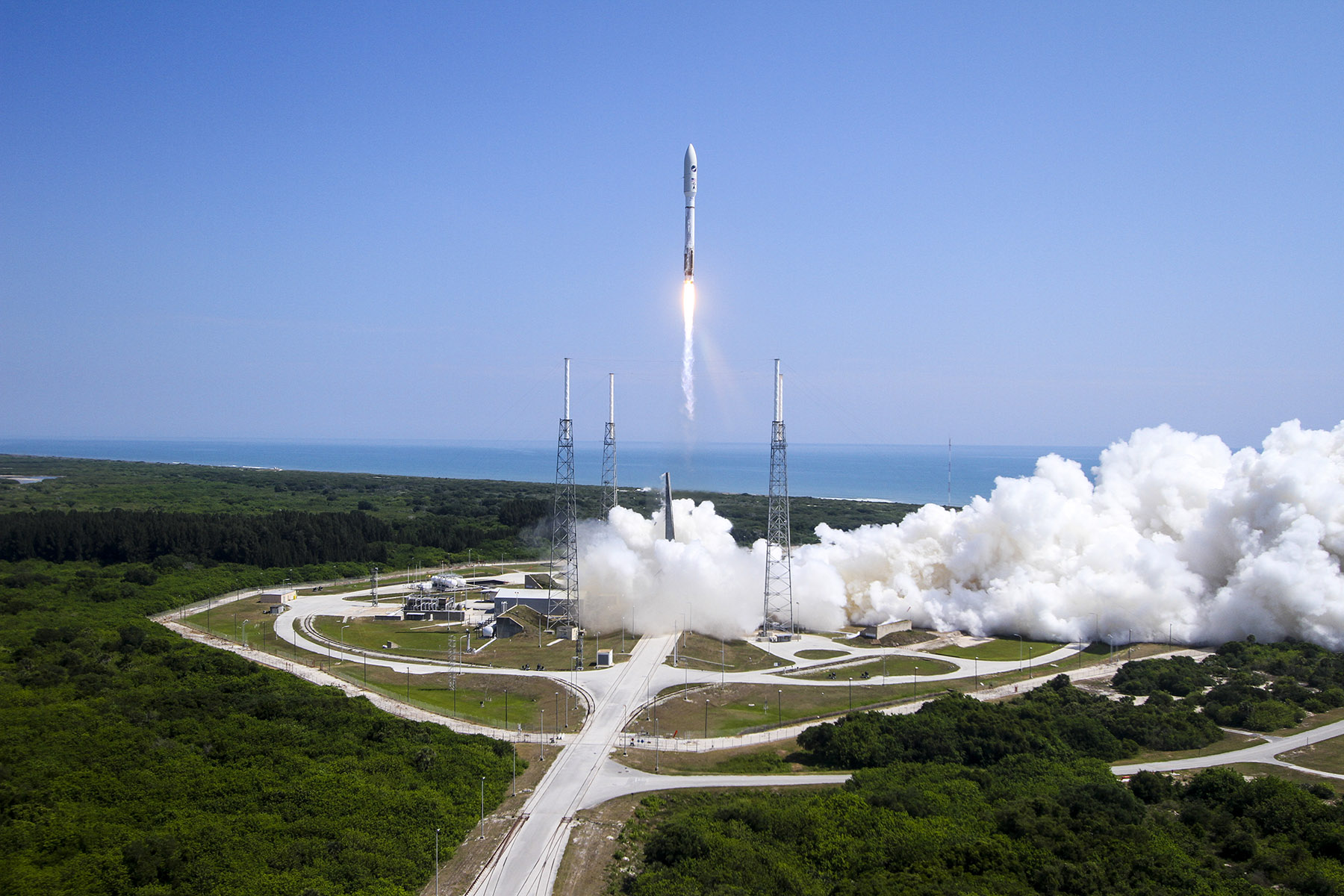
- Launch of OTV-4
- Mission type: Classified
- Operator: Air Force Space Command
- COSPAR ID: 2015-025A
- SATCAT no.: 40651
- Mission duration: 1 year, 11 months and 17 days

Spacecraft properties
- Spacecraft type: Boeing X-37B
- Manufacturer: Boeing
- Launch mass: 5,400 kg (11,900 lb)
- Power: Deployable solar array, batteries

Start of mission
- Launch date: 20 May 2015
- Rocket: Atlas V 501
- Launch site: Cape Canaveral SLC-41
- Contractor: United Launch Alliance

End of mission
- Landing date: 7 May 2017
- Landing site: Shuttle Landing Facility Runway 15

Orbital parameters
- Reference system: Geocentric
- Regime: Low Earth
- Perigee altitude: 312 km (194 mi)
- Apogee altitude: 325 km (202 mi)
- Inclination: 43.50 degrees
- Period: 90.93 minutes

USA-261, also referred to as Orbital Test Vehicle 4 (OTV-4) or AFSPC-5, is the second flight of the second Boeing X-37B, an American unmanned vertical-takeoff, horizontal-landing spaceplane. It was launched to low Earth orbit aboard an Atlas V rocket from Cape Canaveral on May 20, 2015. Its mission designation is part of the USA series.

The spaceplane was operated by the Air Force Space Command, which considers the mission classified and as such has not revealed the objectives. However, the Air Force did reveal that the X-37 would be carrying an experimental hall-effect thruster for testing ahead of potential use in future AEHF satellites. Additionally, NASA announced it was flying a materials science payload similar to MISSE called METIS.

== Mission ==
OTV-4 is the second mission for the second X-37B, and the fourth X-37B mission overall. It flew on an Atlas V rocket, with a 5-meter payload fairing and no solid rocket boosters.

Originally scheduled to launch on May 6, OTV-4 was delayed until May 20 for undisclosed reasons. OTV-4 launched successfully at 11:05 Eastern Time on May 20, 2015.

OTV-4 stayed in orbit for a record-setting 718 days, beating OTV-3's record of 674 days. OTV-4 landed on May 7, 2017, at the Shuttle Landing Facility.

== ELaNa XI ==
NASA utilized the launch of OTV-4 to fly the eleventh ELaNa CubeSat rideshare mission. Ten cubesats were deployed from a P-POD deployment system affixed to the Centaur upper stage.

ELaNa XI included LightSail-1, an experimental solar sail.

== See also ==
- USA-212
- USA-226
