= OTV-5 =

Third flight of the second Boeing X-37B

USA-277
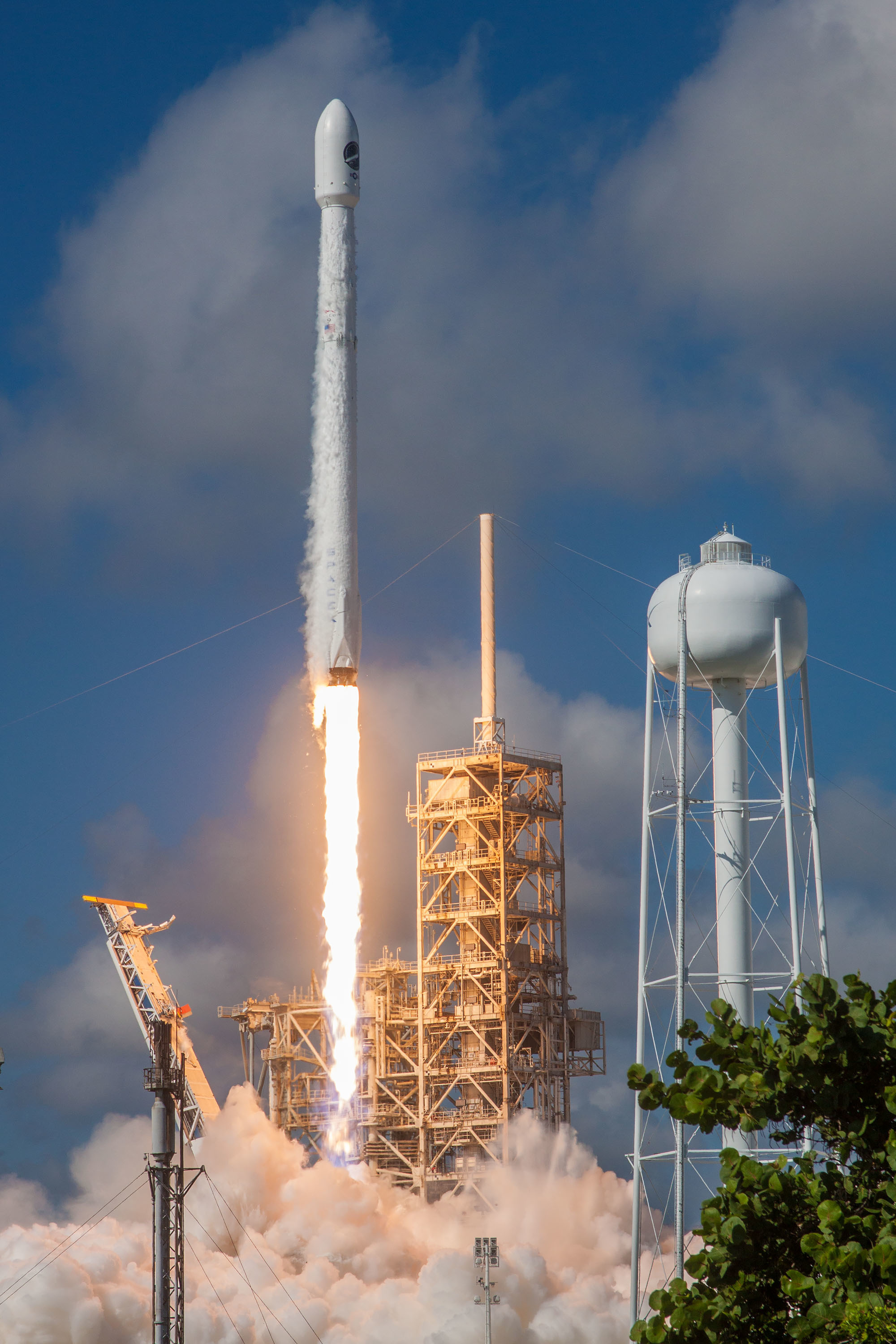
- Launch of OTV-5
- Mission type: Classified
- Operator: Air Force Space Command
- COSPAR ID: 2017-052A
- SATCAT no.: 42932
- Mission duration: 2 years, 1 month and 20 days

Spacecraft properties
- Spacecraft type: Boeing X-37B
- Manufacturer: Boeing
- Launch mass: 5,400 kg (11,900 lb)
- Power: Deployable solar array, batteries

Start of mission
- Launch date: 7 September 2017
- Rocket: Falcon 9, B1040-1
- Launch site: LC-39A
- Contractor: SpaceX

End of mission
- Landing date: 27 October 2019
- Landing site: Shuttle Landing Facility Runway 33

Orbital parameters
- Reference system: Geocentric
- Regime: Low Earth
- Perigee altitude: 355 km (221 mi)
- Apogee altitude: 356 km (221 mi)
- Inclination: 54.5 degrees

USA-277, also referred to as Orbital Test Vehicle 5 (OTV-5), is the third flight of the second Boeing X-37B, an American unmanned vertical-takeoff, horizontal-landing spaceplane. It was launched to low Earth orbit aboard a Falcon 9 rocket from LC-39A on September 7, 2017. Its mission designation is part of the USA series.

The spaceplane was operated by Air Force Space Command, which considers the mission classified and as such has not revealed the objectives. However, the Air Force did reveal that among the onboard payloads was an experimental oscillating heat pipe. Additionally, it was revealed after OTV-5 landed that it had deployed three cubesats in orbit.

== Mission ==
OTV-5 is the third mission for the second X-37B, and the fifth X-37B mission overall. It flew on Falcon 9 booster B1040 from Kennedy Space Center Launch Complex 39A, which touched down at Landing Zone 1 following launch. It was fastest turnaround of a X-37B at 123 days.

OTV-5 was deployed into an orbital inclination of 54.5°, higher than previous X-37B missions. The Air Force has not disclosed the reason for this.

After a record-setting 780 days in orbit, OTV-5 returned to land at the Shuttle Landing Facility on October 27, 2019.

== Satellite Deployments ==
Sometime during its orbital mission, OTV-5 deployed three cubesats, given the designations USA 295, 296 and 297. The deployment was not announced until after OTV-5 had landed, which led to many accusing the US of breaking the Registration Convention. The convention, which the US has ratified, requires newly deployed satellites to be promptly registered with the United Nations Office for Outer Space Affairs.

== See also ==
- USA-212
- USA-226
