= Boeing X-40 =

Test space vehicle

X-40
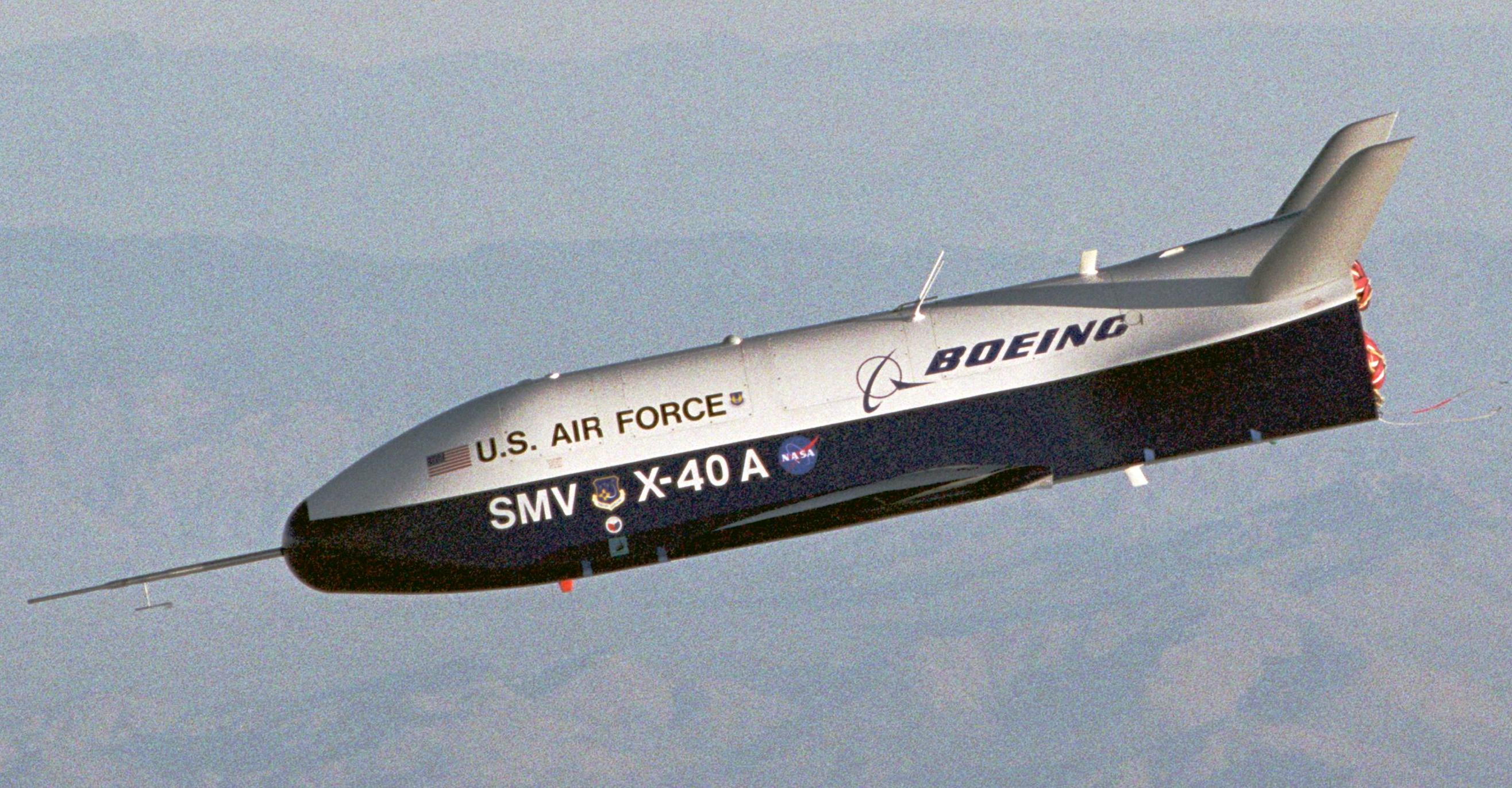
- Boeing X-40A on a descent glide slope

General information
- Type: Glide test vehicle
- National origin: United States
- Manufacturer: Boeing Phantom Works
- Status: Retired May 2001
- Primary users: Air Force Research Laboratory NASA
- Number built: 1

History
- First flight: August 11, 1998 (dropped by UH-60 Black Hawk)

The Boeing X-40 Space Maneuver Vehicle is a test platform for the Boeing X-37 reusable spaceplane, built by Boeing Phantom Works. It sought to test the X-37's systems in order to "reduce the cost and risk of future reusable space launch vehicle system".

== History ==
The uncrewed X-40A was an 80%-90% subscale version of the Boeing X-37 reusable spaceplane, but lacking in propulsion or thermal protection systems. Boeing built the X-40A originally for the Air Force as part of that service’s Space Maneuver Vehicle program.

The aircraft was built at Boeing Phantom Works at Seal Beach, California, in partnership with the Air Force Research Laboratory.

After the first drop test in August 1998 the vehicle was transferred to NASA, which modified it. Between April 4 and May 19, 2001, the vehicle successfully conducted seven free flights. In 2001 it successfully demonstrated the glide capabilities of the X-37's fat-bodied, short-winged design and validated the proposed guidance system.

== Testing ==
The first X-40A drop test occurred at Holloman AFB, New Mexico on August 11, 1998 at 06:59. It was released from an altitude of approximately 10,000 feet (3,000 m) and 2.5 miles (4.0 km) away from the end of Runway 04 by a UH-60 Black Hawk helicopter (later tests used an Army CH-47D Chinook helicopter). The vehicle dove to the runway in an approach similar to the Space Shuttle's, flared, and landed left of the runway centerline. Its drag chutes successfully deployed, and the vehicle tracked to within 7 feet (2.1 m) of the centerline and stopped at a distance of slightly more than 7,000 feet (2,100 m).

The X-40A flew seven approach and landing test flights at NASA’s Dryden (now Armstrong) Flight Research Center in Edwards, California, in 2001 to reduce risk for the X-37 program, including in-flight evaluation of guidance, navigation and control software for its autonomous flight controls. One test flight the craft was towed by an Army CH-47D Chinook helicopter to an altitude of 15,000 feet, and then released to fly an autonomously controlled 75-second descent to a landing on the main runway at Edwards Air Force Base, where it then glided and guided itself.

== Specifications (X-40A) ==
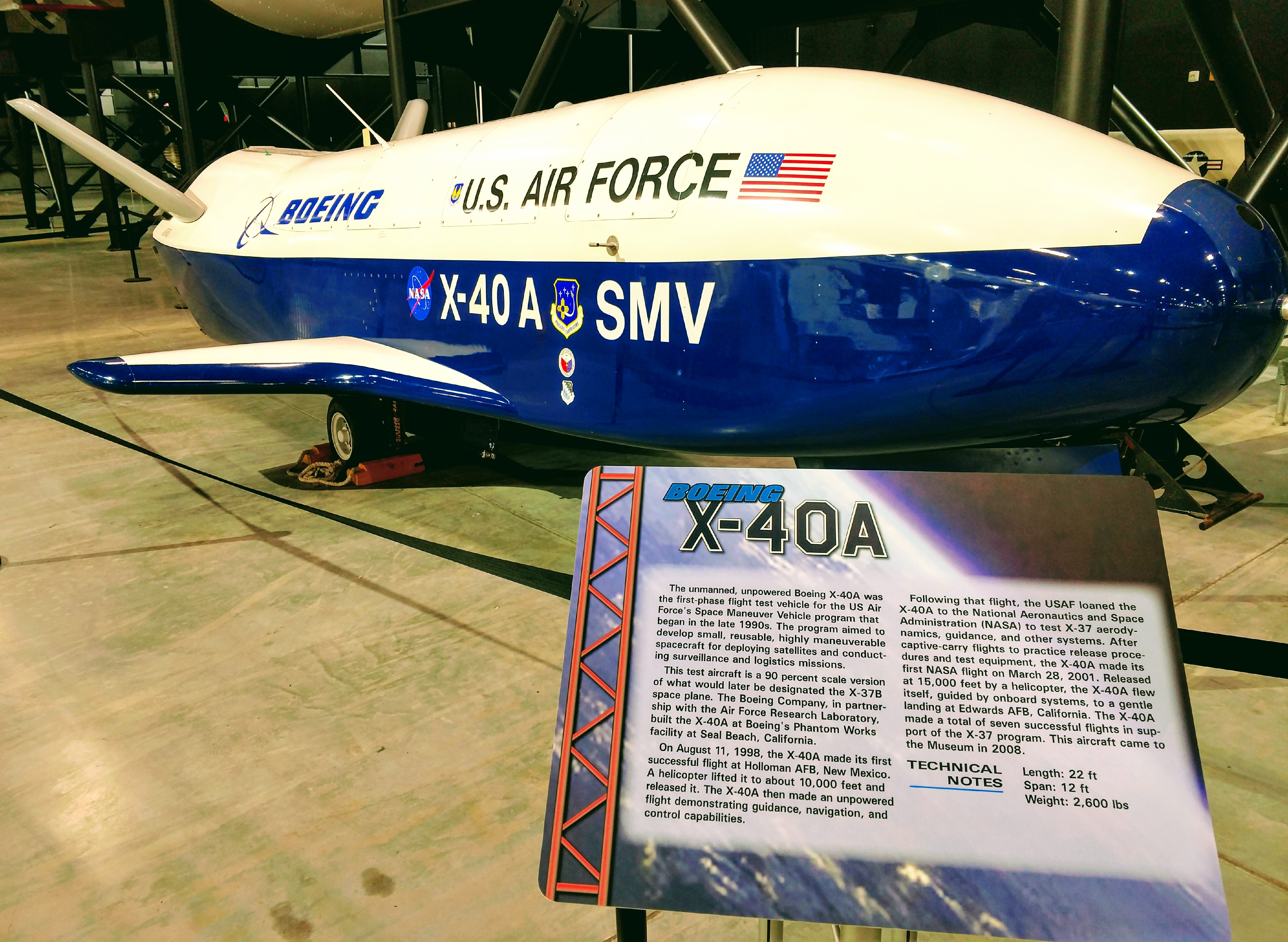
X-40A on display at the National Museum of the United States Air Force

Data from Boeing X-40A - National Museum of the United States Air Force

General characteristics

- Length: 22 ft (6.7 m)
- Wingspan: 12 ft (3.7 m)
- Empty weight: 2,600 lb (1,179 kg)

Performance

== See also ==
Related development

- Boeing X-37

Related lists

- List of X-planes
- List of experimental aircraft
