= OTV-3 =

Second flight of the first Boeing X-37B

USA-240
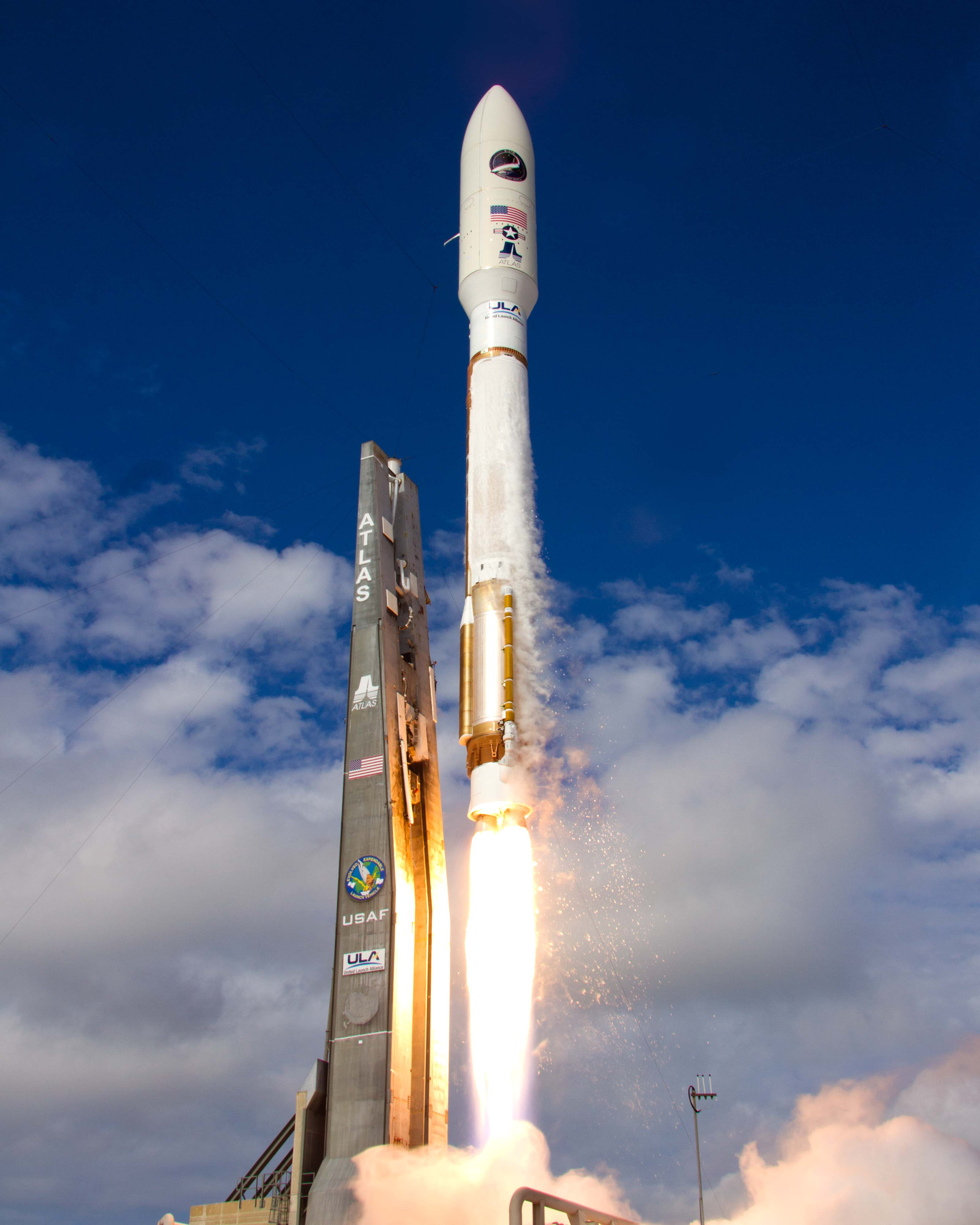
- Launch of OTV-3
- Mission type: Demonstration
- Operator: Air Force Space Command
- COSPAR ID: 2012-071A
- SATCAT no.: 39025
- Mission duration: 1 year, 10 months and 6 days

Spacecraft properties
- Spacecraft type: Boeing X-37B
- Manufacturer: Boeing
- Launch mass: 5,400 kg (11,900 lb)
- Power: Deployable solar array, batteries

Start of mission
- Launch date: 11 December 2012, 18:03 UTC
- Rocket: Atlas V 501
- Launch site: Cape Canaveral SLC-41
- Contractor: United Launch Alliance

End of mission
- Landing date: 17 October 2014, 16:24 UTC
- Landing site: Vandenberg AFB Runway 12

Orbital parameters
- Reference system: Geocentric
- Regime: Low Earth
- Semi-major axis: 6,698.18 km (4,162.06 mi)
- Eccentricity: 0.0009437
- Perigee altitude: 320 km (200 mi)
- Apogee altitude: 333 km (207 mi)
- Inclination: 43.50 degrees
- Period: 90.93 minutes
- Mean motion: 15.84
- Epoch: 13 August 2014, 18:50:13 UTC

USA-240, also referred to as Orbital Test Vehicle 3 (OTV-3), is the second flight of the first Boeing X-37B, an American unmanned robotic vertical-takeoff, horizontal-landing spaceplane. It was launched to low Earth orbit aboard an Atlas V rocket from Cape Canaveral on 11 December 2012. Its mission designation is part of the USA series.

The spaceplane was operated by Air Force Space Command, which has not revealed the specific objectives of the mission or identity of the mission's payload. The Air Force stated only that the "mission will incorporate the lessons learned during the refurbishment process on OTV-1. As the X-37B program is examining the affordability and reusability of space vehicles, validation through testing is vital to the process. We are excited to see how this vehicle performs on a second flight."

== Mission ==
OTV-3, the second mission for the first X-37B, and the third X-37B mission overall, was originally scheduled to be launched on 25 October 2012, but was postponed because of an engine issue with the Atlas V launch vehicle. The X-37B was successfully launched from Cape Canaveral on 11 December 2012. In March 2014, OTV-3 broke the X-37B program's endurance record by passing 470 days in space.

The vehicle landed at Vandenberg AFB on 17 October 2014 at 16:24 UTC, having spent just short of 675 days in orbit.

== See also ==
- 2012 in spaceflight
- USA-212
- USA-226
