= Drop test =

Method of testing aircraft/spacecraft

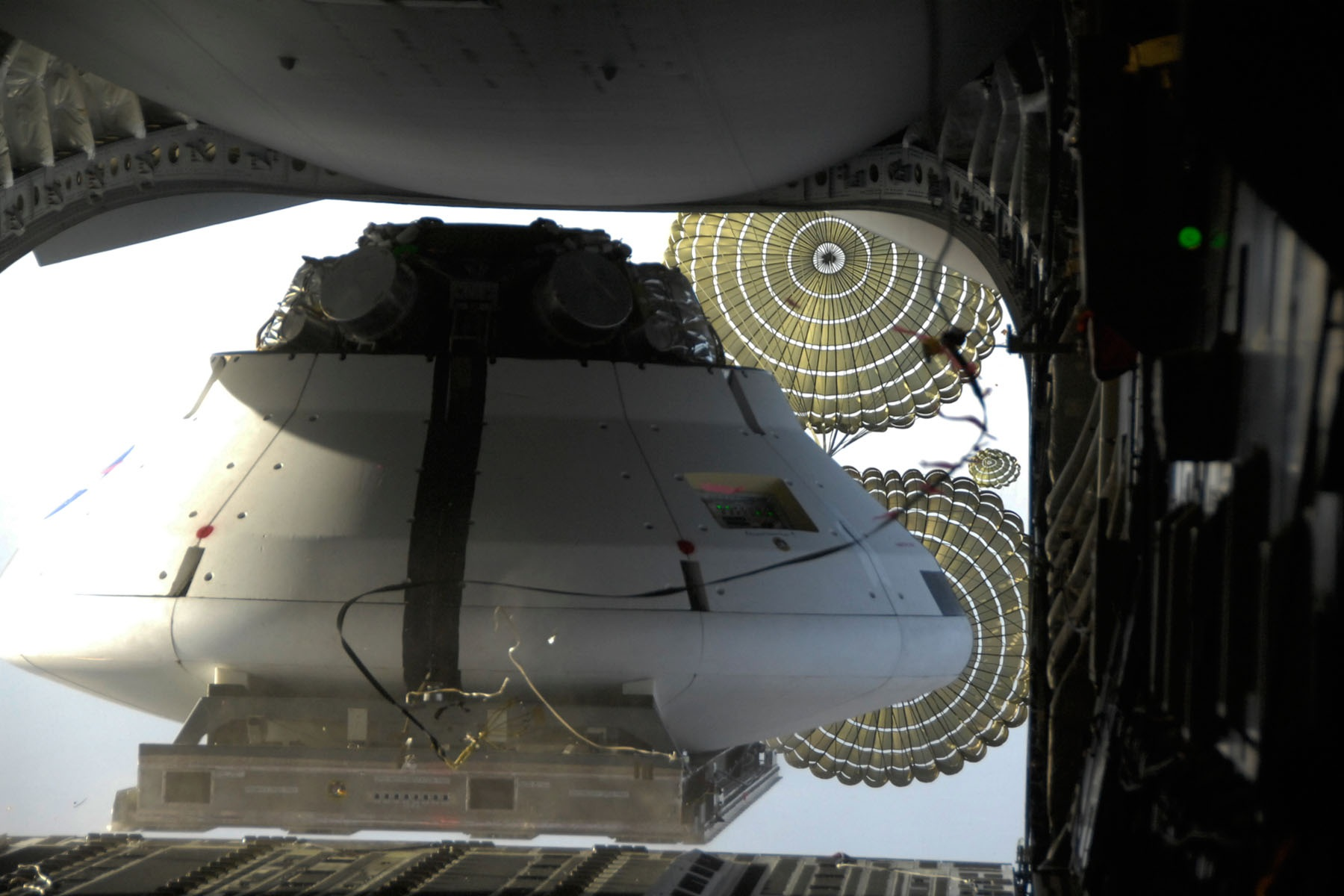
Orion test article being released during airborne drop test.

A drop test is a method of testing the in-flight characteristics of prototype or experimental aircraft and spacecraft by raising the test vehicle to a specific altitude and then releasing it. Test flights involving powered aircraft, particularly rocket-powered aircraft, may be referred to as drop launches due to the launch of the aircraft's rockets after release from its carrier aircraft.

In the case of unpowered aircraft, the test vehicle falls or glides after its release in an unpowered descent to a landing site. Drop tests may be used to verify the aerodynamic performance and flight dynamics of the test vehicle, to test its landing systems, or to evaluate survivability of a planned or crash landing. This allows the vehicle's designers to validate computer flight models, wind tunnel testing, or other theoretical design characteristics of an aircraft or spacecraft's design.

High-altitude drop tests may be conducted by carrying the test vehicle aboard a mothership to a target altitude for release. Low-altitude drop tests may be conducted by releasing the test vehicle from a crane or gantry.

== Aircraft and lifting-body testing ==
=== Carrier landing simulation tests ===
The landing gear on aircraft used on aircraft carriers must be stronger than those on land-based aircraft, due to higher approach speeds and sink rates during carrier landings. As early as the 1940s, drop tests were conducted by lifting a carrier-based plane such as the Grumman F6F Hellcat to a height of ten feet and then dropped, simulating the impact of a landing at nineteen feet per second (5.8 m/s). The F6F was ultimately dropped from a height of twenty feet (6.1 m), demonstrating it could absorb twice the force of a carrier landing. Drop tests are still used in the development and testing of carrier-based aircraft; in 2010, the Lockheed Martin F-35C Lightning II underwent drop tests to simulate its maximum descent rate of 26.4 feet per second (8.0 m/s) during carrier landings.

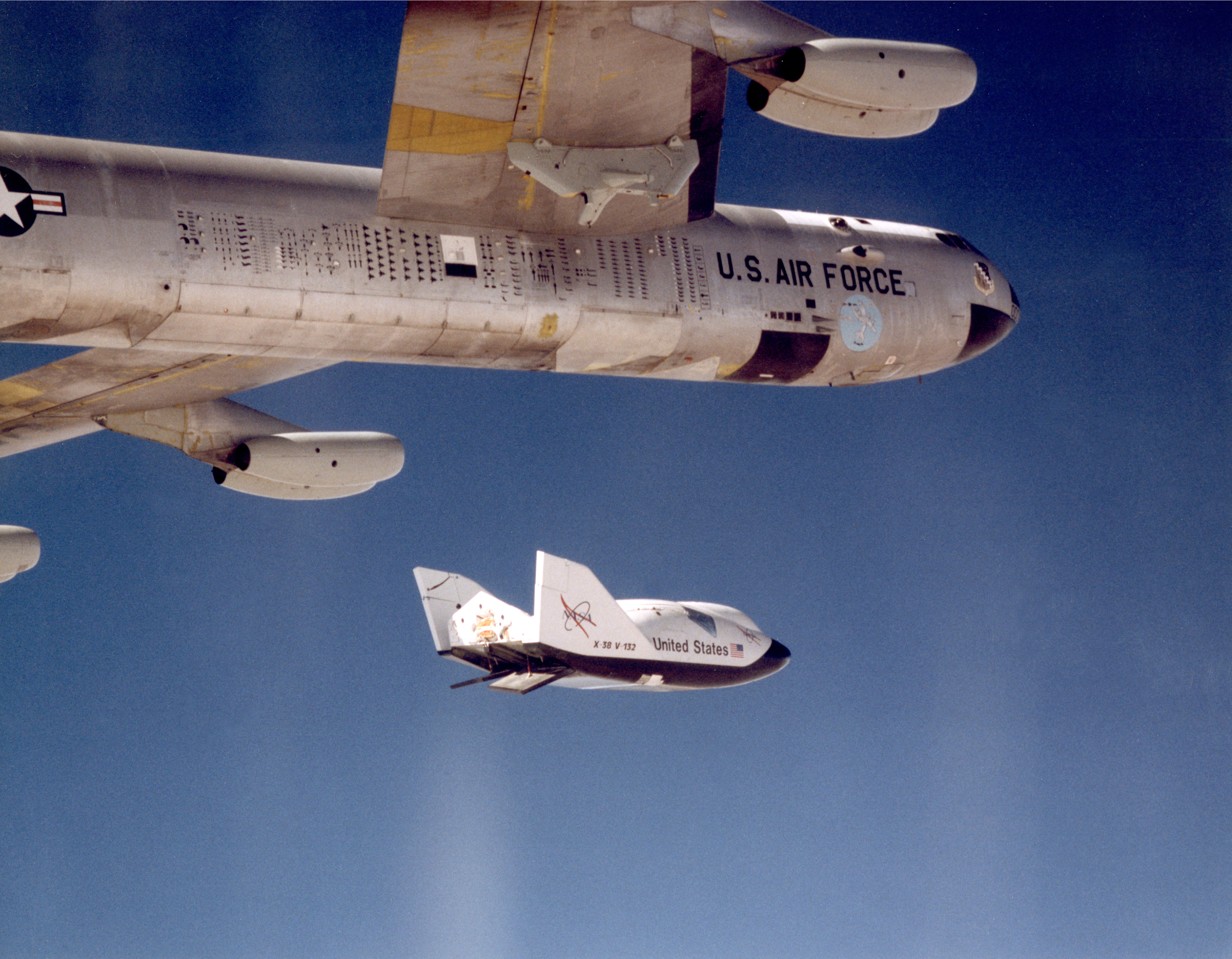
The X-38 research vehicle is released from Balls 8, NASA's B-52 mothership during a drop test. The pylon used to carry experimental vehicles is visible near the top of the photo, between the fuselage and inboard right engine.

=== Experimental aircraft ===
Numerous experimental and prototype aircraft have been drop tested or drop launched. Many powered X-planes, including the Bell X-1, Bell X-2, North American X-15, Martin Marietta X-24A and X-24B, Orbital Sciences X-34, Boeing X-40, and NASA X-43A were specifically designed to be drop launched. test articles of the unpowered NASA X-38 were also drop tested, from altitudes of up to 45,000 feet (14,000 m), in order to study its aerodynamic and handling qualities, autonomous flight capabilities, and deployment of its steerable parafoil.

Some experimental aircraft designed for airborne launches, such as the Northrop HL-10, have made both unpowered drop tests and powered drop launches. Prior to powered flights using its rocket engine, the HL-10 made 11 unpowered drop flights in order to study the handling qualities and stability of the lifting body in flight.

=== Balls 8 mothership ===
Early experimental aircraft, such as the X-1 and X-2, were carried aboard modified B-29 and B-50 bombers. In the 1950s, the United States Air Force provided NASA with a B-52 bomber to be used as a mothership for the experimental X-15. Built in 1955, the B-52 was only the 10th to come off the assembly line, and was used by the Air Force for flight testing before turning it over to NASA. Flying with NASA tail number 008, the plane was nicknamed Balls 8 by Air Force pilots, following a tradition of referring to aircraft numbered with multiple zeroes as "Balls" plus the final number.

Balls 8 received significant modifications in order to carry the X-15. A special pylon, designed to carry and release the X-15, was installed under the right wing between the fuselage and inboard engine. A notch was also cut out of one of the right wing's flaps so that the plane could accommodate the X-15's vertical tail. Balls 8 was one of two such bombers modified to carry the X-15; while the other plane was retired in 1969 after the end of the X-15 program, NASA continued using Balls 8 for drop tests until it was retired in 2004. During its 50-year career, Balls 8 carried numerous experimental vehicles including the HL-10, X-24A, X-24B, X-38, and X-43A.

=== X-24B role in Space Shuttle development ===
During the design of the Space Shuttle orbiter in the 1970s, engineers debated whether to design the orbiter to glide to an unpowered landing or equip the orbiter with pop-out jet engines in order to make a powered landing. While powered landing design required carrying the engines and jet fuel, adding weight and complexity to the orbiter, engineers began favoring the powered landing option. In response, NASA conducted unpowered drop tests of the X-24B to demonstrate the feasibility of landing a lifting-body aircraft in unpowered flight. In 1975, the X-24B aircraft was dropped from a Balls 8 at an altitude of 45,000 feet (14,000 m) above the Mojave Desert, and then ignited rocket engines to increase speed and propel it to 60,000 feet (18,000 m). Once the rocket engine cut off, the high-speed and high-altitude conditions permitted the X-24B to simulate the path of a Space Shuttle orbiter under post-atmospheric reentry conditions. The X-24B successfully made two unpowered precision landings at Edwards Air Force Base, demonstrating the feasibility of an unpowered lifting body design for the Space Shuttle. These successes convinced those in charge of the Space Shuttle program to commit to an unpowered landing design, which would save weight and increase the orbiter's payload capacity.

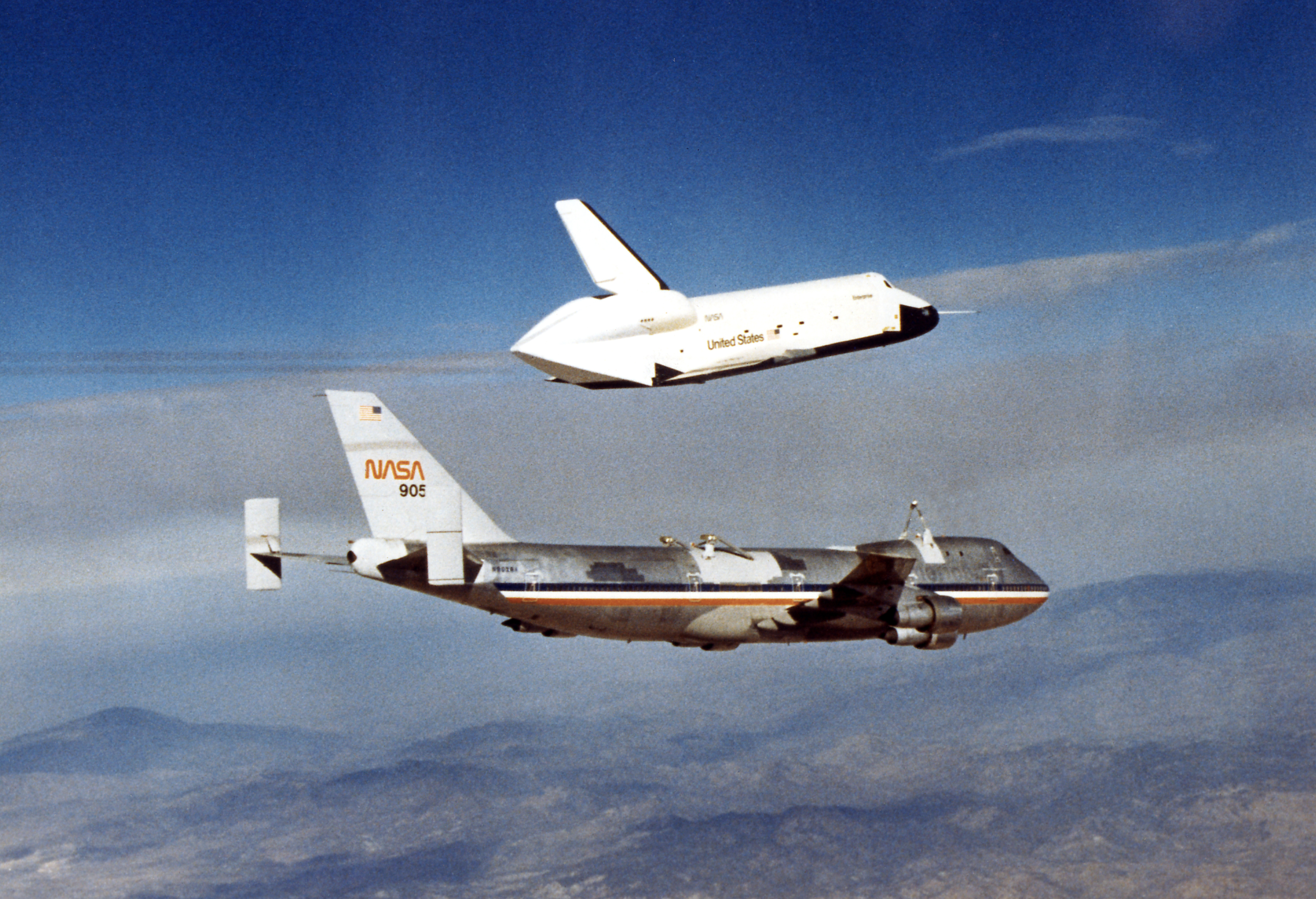
Enterprise being released by Shuttle Carrier Aircraft

=== Space Shuttle Enterprise ===
In 1977, a series of drop tests of the Space Shuttle Enterprise were conducted to test the Space Shuttle's flight characteristics. Because the Space Shuttle is designed to glide unpowered during its descent and landing, a series of drop tests using a test orbiter were used to demonstrate that the orbiter could be successfully controlled in unpowered flight. These drop tests, known as the Approach and Landing Test program, used a modified Boeing 747, known as the Shuttle Carrier Aircraft or SCA, to carry Enterprise to an altitude of 15,000 to 30,000 feet (4,600 to 9,100 m). After a series of captive-flight tests in which the orbiter was not released, five free-flight tests were performed in August through October 1977.

While free-flight tests of Enterprise involved the release of an unpowered aircraft from a powered aircraft, these tests were not typical of drop testing because the orbiter was actually carried and released from a position above the SCA. This arrangement was potentially dangerous because it placed Enterprise in free flight directly in front of the SCA's tail fin immediately after release. As a result, the "drop" was conducted by using a series of carefully planned maneuvers to minimize the risk of aircraft collision. Immediately after release, the Enterprise would climb to the right while the SCA performed a shallow dive to the left, allowing for quick vertical and horizontal separation between the two aircraft.

=== Dream Chaser ===
In mid-2013, Sierra Nevada Corporation plans to conduct drop tests of its Dream Chaser prototype commercial spaceplane. The uncrewed first flight test will drop the Dream Chaser prototype from an altitude of 12,000 feet (3,700 m) by a Columbia 234-UT helicopter, where it is planned that the vehicle will autonomously fly to an unpowered landing at Dryden Flight Research Center. The Dream Chaser successfully completed the free-flight and passed the drop test on November 11 over the Mojave Desert. The uncrewed vehicle made a landing at Edwards Air Force Base.

== Crewed capsule testing ==
Drop tests of prototype crewed space capsules may be done to test the survivability of landing, primarily by testing the capsule's descent characteristics and its post-reentry landing systems. These tests are typically carried out uncrewed prior to any human spaceflight testing.

=== Apollo command module ===
In 1963, North American Aviation built BP-19A, an uncrewed boilerplate Apollo command module for use in drop testing. NASA conducted a series of tests in 1964 which involved dropping BP-19A from a C-133 Cargomaster in order to test the capsule's parachute systems prior to the start of crewed testing of the Apollo spacecraft.

=== Orion capsule ===
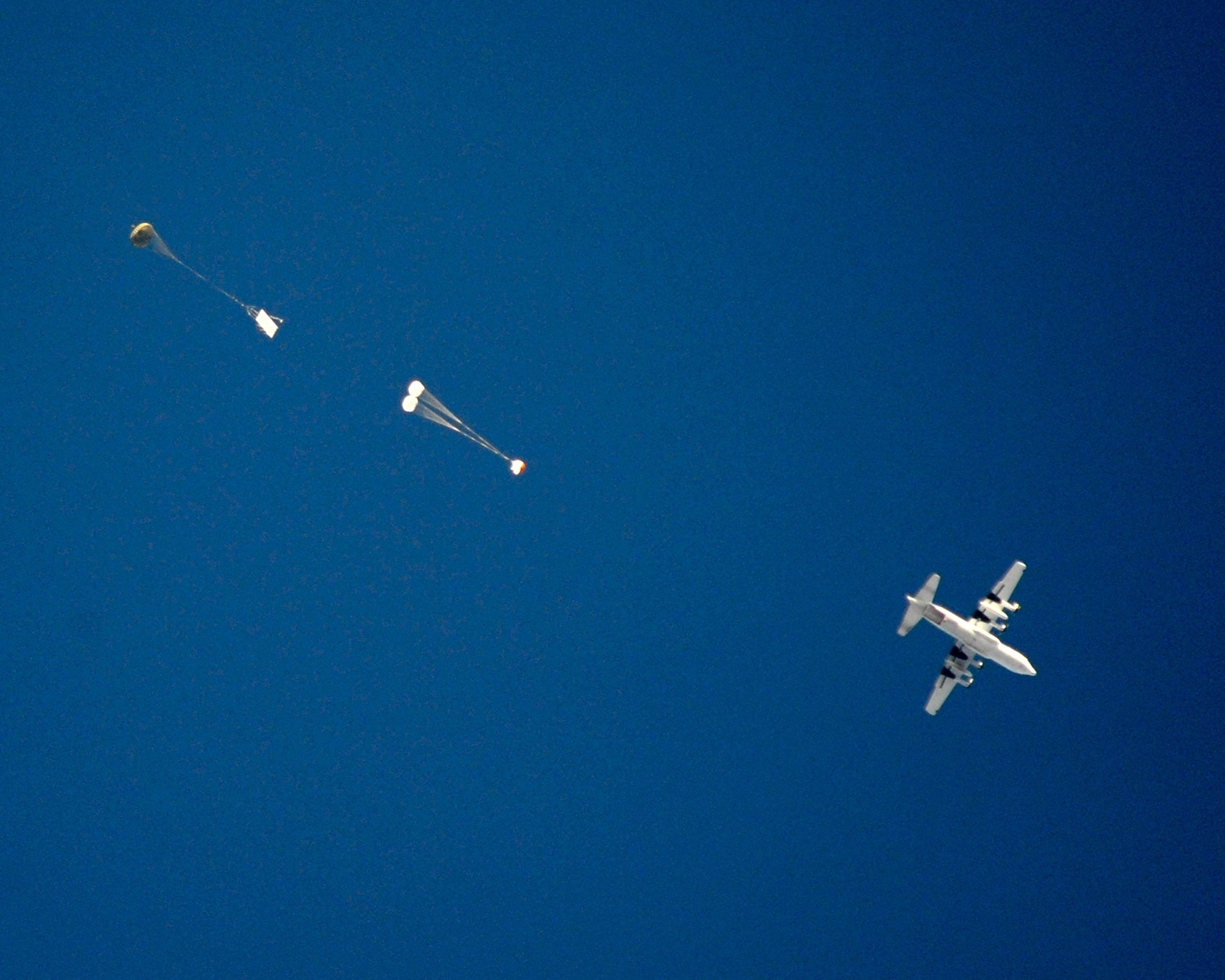
Orion test article after release from C-130 and separation from pallet

In 2011 and 2012, NASA conducted a series of short drop tests on the survivability of water landings in its Orion crewed capsule by repeatedly dropping an Orion test vehicle into a large water basin. The tests simulated water landings at speeds varying from 7 to 50 mph (11 to 80 km/h) by changing the height of the drop gantry above the basin. The range of landing velocities allowed NASA to simulate a range of possible entry and landing conditions during water landings.

In 2011 and 2012, NASA also conducted drop tests of the Orion test vehicle's parachute systems and land-based landing capabilities. In each test, the Orion spacecraft was dropped from a C-17 or C-130 cargo plane. For testing, the capsule is mounted on a pallet system and placed inside the cargo aircraft. Parachutes on the pallet are used to pull the pallet and capsule out of the rear of the aircraft; the capsule then separates from the pallet and begins its free fall descent.

On March 4, 2012, a C-17 dropped an Orion test article from an altitude of 25,000 feet (7,600 m). The capsule's parachutes successfully deployed between 15,000 to 20,000 feet (4,600 to 6,100 m), slowing the spacecraft to a landing on ground in the Arizona desert. The capsule landed at a speed of 17 mph (27 km/h), well below the designed maximum touchdown speed.

=== Boeing CST-100 ===
In September 2011, Boeing conducted a series of drop tests, carried out in the Mojave Desert of southeast California, to validate the design of the CST-100 capsule's parachute and airbag cushioning landing systems. The airbags are located underneath the heat shield of the CST-100, which is designed to be separated from the capsule while under parachute descent at about 5,000 feet (1,500 m) altitude. The tests were carried out at ground speeds between 10 and 30 miles per hour (16 and 48 km/h) in order to simulate cross wind conditions at the time of landing. Bigelow Aerospace built the mobile test rig and conducted the tests.

In April 2012, Boeing conducted another drop test of its CST-100 prototype space capsule in order to test the capsule's landing systems. The test vehicle was raised by helicopter to an altitude of 11,000 feet (3,400 m) and then released; the capsule's three main parachutes then deployed successfully and slowed the capsule's descent. Immediately prior to landing, the capsule's six airbags inflated underneath the capsule in order to absorb some of the impact energy from landing. Similar drop tests are planned in order to conduct additional airbag testing, as well as drogue chute and heat shield jettison tests.

== Helicopter testing ==
In 2009 and 2010, NASA conducted a pair of drop tests to study the survivability of helicopter crashes. Using an MD 500 helicopter donated by the U.S. Army, NASA dropped the helicopter at an angle from an altitude of 35 feet (11 m) to simulate a hard helicopter landing. Sophisticated crash test dummies with simulated internal organs were located inside the helicopter and used to assess internal injuries from such a crash. Due to extensive damage to the test helicopter after the second test, no third test was planned.
