= Department of the Air Force Rapid Capabilities Office =

American government agency

Air Force Rapid Capabilities Office

Agency overview
- Formed: April 28, 2003; 23 years ago
- Parent agency: U.S. Department of the Air Force
- Website: www.af.mil/About-Us/Fact-Sheets/Display/Article/2424302/rapid-capabilities-office/

The Department of the Air Force Rapid Capabilities Office (RCO or DAF RCO) is an office in the United States Department of the Air Force tasked with expediting the development of select technological systems. The RCO was activated by the secretary of the Air Force on April 28, 2003, and is currently overseeing the development of the U.S. Air Force's Northrop Grumman B-21 Raider in partnership with Northrop Grumman, and the U.S. Space Force's X-37B Orbital Test Vehicle in partnership with NASA.
