= OTV-1 =

Unmanned spaceflight mission; first flight of the Boeing X-37B Orbital Test Vehicle 1

USA-212
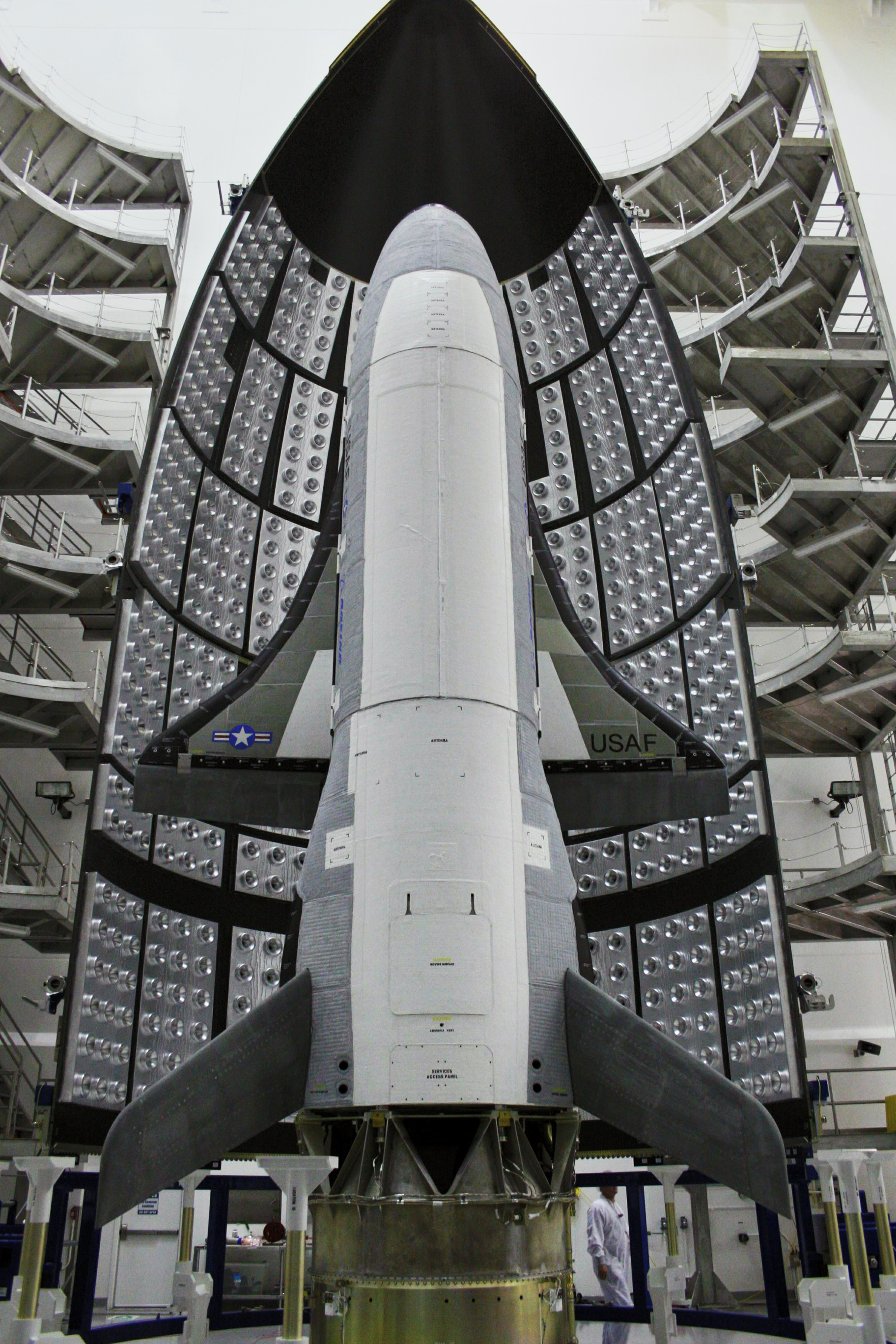
- OTV-1 during encapsulation prior to maiden launch
- Mission type: Demonstration
- Operator: Air Force Space Command
- COSPAR ID: 2010-015A
- SATCAT no.: 36514
- Mission duration: 224 days, 9 hours, 24 minutes

Spacecraft properties
- Spacecraft type: Boeing X-37B
- Manufacturer: Boeing
- Launch mass: 5,400 kg (11,900 lb)
- Power: Deployable solar array, batteries

Start of mission
- Launch date: 22 April 2010, 23:52:00 UTC
- Rocket: Atlas V 501
- Launch site: SLC-41, Cape Canaveral
- Contractor: United Launch Alliance

End of mission
- Landing date: 3 December 2010, 09:16:00 UTC
- Landing site: Vandenberg, Runway 12

Orbital parameters
- Reference system: Geocentric
- Regime: Low Earth
- Semi-major axis: 6,598 km (4,100 mi)
- Eccentricity: 0.0006
- Perigee altitude: 279 km (173 mi)
- Apogee altitude: 287 km (178 mi)
- Inclination: 39.9979°
- Period: 88.9 min
- Mean motion: 15.97
- Epoch: 29 November 2010, 04:26:19 UTC

USA-212 was the first flight of the Boeing X-37B Orbital Test Vehicle 1 (X-37B OTV-1), an American robotic vertical-takeoff, horizontal-landing (VTHL) spaceplane. It was launched aboard an Atlas V rocket from Cape Canaveral on 22 April 2010, and operated in low Earth orbit. Its designation is part of the USA series.

The spaceplane was operated by Air Force Space Command, which has not revealed the specific identity of the spaceship's payload for the mission. The Air Force has stated only that the spacecraft would "demonstrate various experiments and allow satellite sensors, subsystems, components, and associated technology to be transported into space and back."

== Launch ==
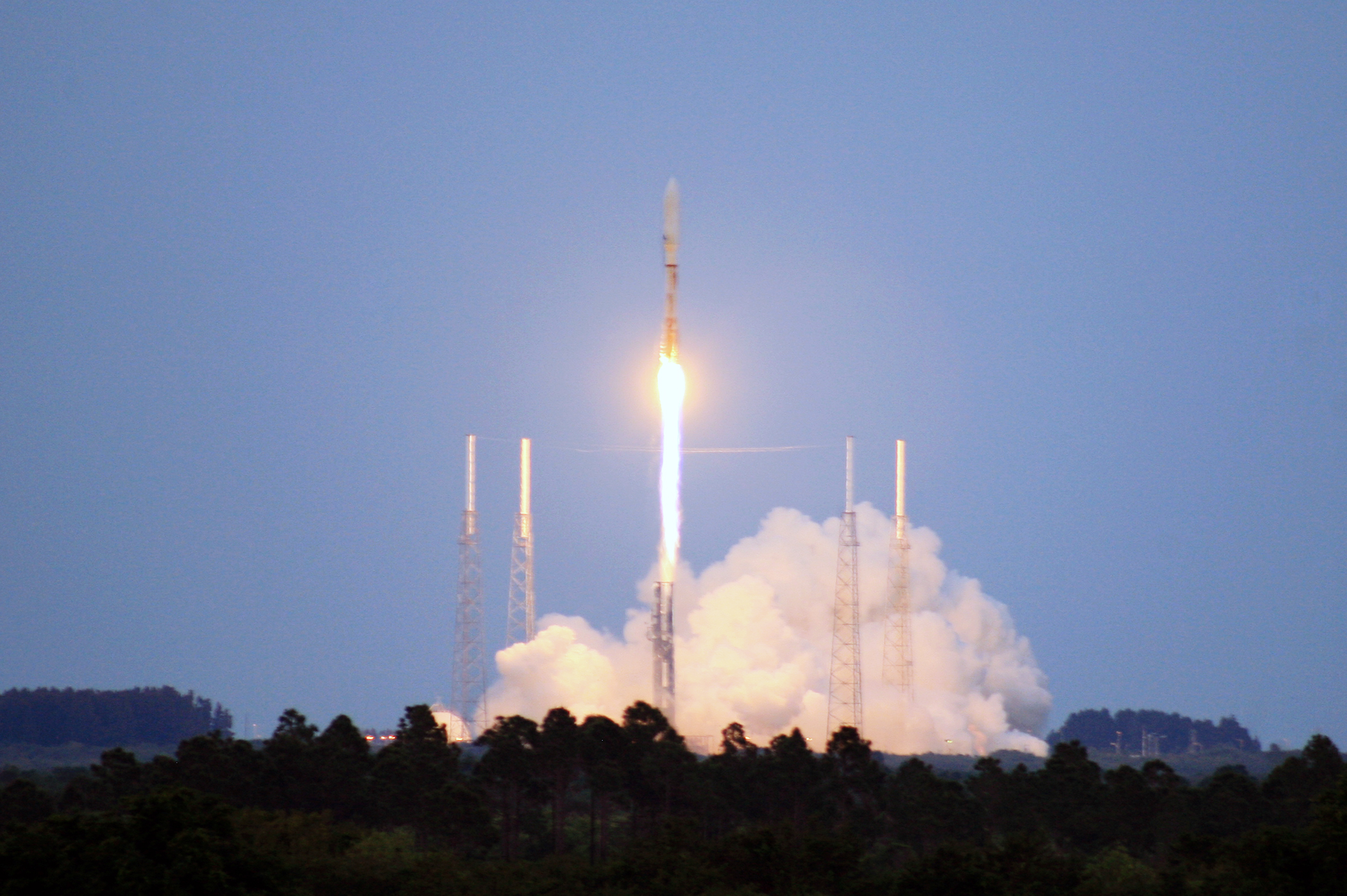
Launch of OTV-1

USA-212 was launched on an Atlas V 501 rocket, tail number AV-012, from Space Launch Complex 41 at the Cape Canaveral Air Force Station in Florida. The launch, which was conducted by United Launch Alliance, occurred at 23:52 UTC on 22 April 2010, placing the spacecraft into low Earth orbit for testing.

The X-37B spacecraft was originally intended to be deployed from the payload bay of a NASA Space Shuttle, but following the Columbia accident, it was transferred to a Delta II 7920. It was subsequently transferred to the Atlas V following concerns over the X-37B's aerodynamic properties during launch.

The launch was the first flight of the Atlas V 501 configuration, and the first in four years to use a 5.4-meter (18 ft) payload fairing. Prior to the installation of the spacecraft, the Atlas rocket was moved to the launch pad and performed a wet dress rehearsal on 2 April 2010. It was returned to the Vertical Integration Facility the next day for final assembly. The X-37 arrived at the VIF on 8 April. On 9 April, a 24-hour delay was announced. It subsequently slipped a further 24 hours after the landing of Space Shuttle Discovery on Mission STS-131 was delayed, as the Eastern Range could not have been reconfigured quickly enough to accommodate both events on the same day. After a series of delays, it was set for 19 April 2010. On 21 April, the Atlas was rolled back out to the launch pad for launch. The launch window on 22 April opened at 23:52 UTC, and closed at 00:01 on 23 April.

== Mission ==
Most of the mission parameters for the USA-212 flight have not been disclosed. The vehicle is capable of being on-orbit for up to 270 days. The Air Force stated the mission time would depend on progress of the craft's experiments during orbit. Mission control was handled by the 3rd Space Experimentation Squadron, 21st Space Wing, of the Air Force Space Command in Colorado Springs.

=== Observations by amateur skywatchers ===
In May 2010, an amateur astronomer claimed to spot the spacecraft from his home in Toronto, Ontario, Canada. Shortly after the initial observation, several more detailed observations were made by amateur skywatchers from around the world, who reported the spacecraft to have an almost circular 401 to 422 km (249 to 262 mi) low Earth orbit with an inclination of 40°. The group believed in their calculations and observations with a high degree of confidence. The spacecraft's ground track was observed to repeat every four days, which was considered indicative for a possible imaging reconnaissance mission profile.

For two weeks, starting on 29 July, the amateur skywatchers were unable to find the spacecraft in the locations they had predicted, leading them to believe it had suddenly changed its course. During the mission, the vehicle was observed to change its orbit multiple times, with a total delta-v of the first four orbit changes amounting to 102 m/s (330 ft/s). A common characteristic of all the orbits was that the ground track nearly repeated every few days. By 12 November 2010, the orbit had been lowered to 281 by 292 km (175 by 181 mi) with the ground track now repeating every three days (47 orbits).

=== Altitude and ground track resonance history ===
Based on data collected by amateur observers, the following orbital characteristics were calculated by amateur skywatcher Ted Molczan.

Time period	Periapsis (AMSL)	Apoapsis (AMSL)	Resonance (orbits:days)
22 April 2010 – 9 August 2010	403 km (250 mi)	420 km (260 mi)	61:4
9 August 2010 – 6 October 2010	433 km (269 mi)	444 km (276 mi)	91:6
6 October 2010 – 1 November 2010	390 km (240 mi)	395 km (245 mi)	46:3
1 November 2010 – 12 November 2010	315 km (196 mi)	328 km (204 mi)	31:2
12 November 2010 – 3 December 2010	281 km (175 mi)	292 km (181 mi)	47:3

== Landing ==
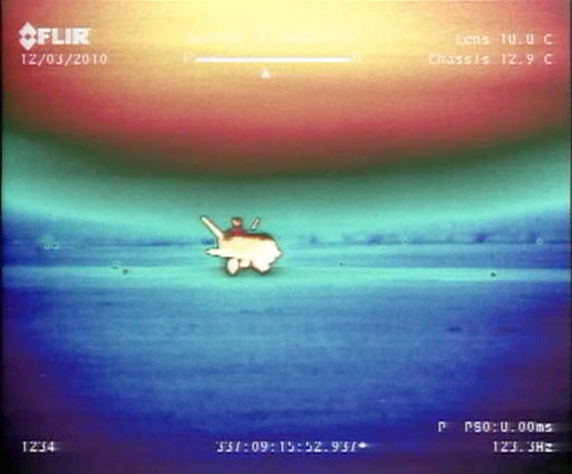
Infrared view of OTV1 after landing

After completing its mission, the X-37B was deorbited, entered the atmosphere, and landed at Vandenberg Air Force Base on 3 December 2010.

The X-37B is the second reusable spacecraft to perform an automated landing after returning from orbit, the first being the Soviet Buran spacecraft in 1988.

== Hypothetical mission components ==
As the mission of USA-212 and the X-37B program are classified, public commentary on the program is speculation. James Oberg speculated that the concurrent launch of Air Force's Hypersonic Technology Vehicle HTV-2 was related to the mission. Part of an X-37B's mission profile might involve a simulated enemy attack, which the X-37B should be able to detect and autonomously counteract. HTV-2 was launched at 23:00 UTC on 22 April 2010, i.e., 52 minutes ahead of X-37B, from Vandenberg Air Force Base in California, on a suborbital trajectory supposed to last less than 25 min. The mission failed and was aborted nine minutes after launch.

William Scott, coauthor of the techno-novel Counterspace: The Next Hours of World War III and former Rocky Mountain Bureau Chief for Aviation Week & Space Technology magazine believes that with X-37B, the Air Force might test weapon delivery from a space plane in low Earth orbit. He mentions Rods from God as a possible scenario. This hypothesis aligns with speculation that the launch of USA-212 marks the beginning of military operations in space.

== See also ==
- 2010 in spaceflight
- Lockheed Martin X-33
- USA-226
- List of USA satellites
