= OTV-2 =

First flight of the second Boeing X-37B

USA-226
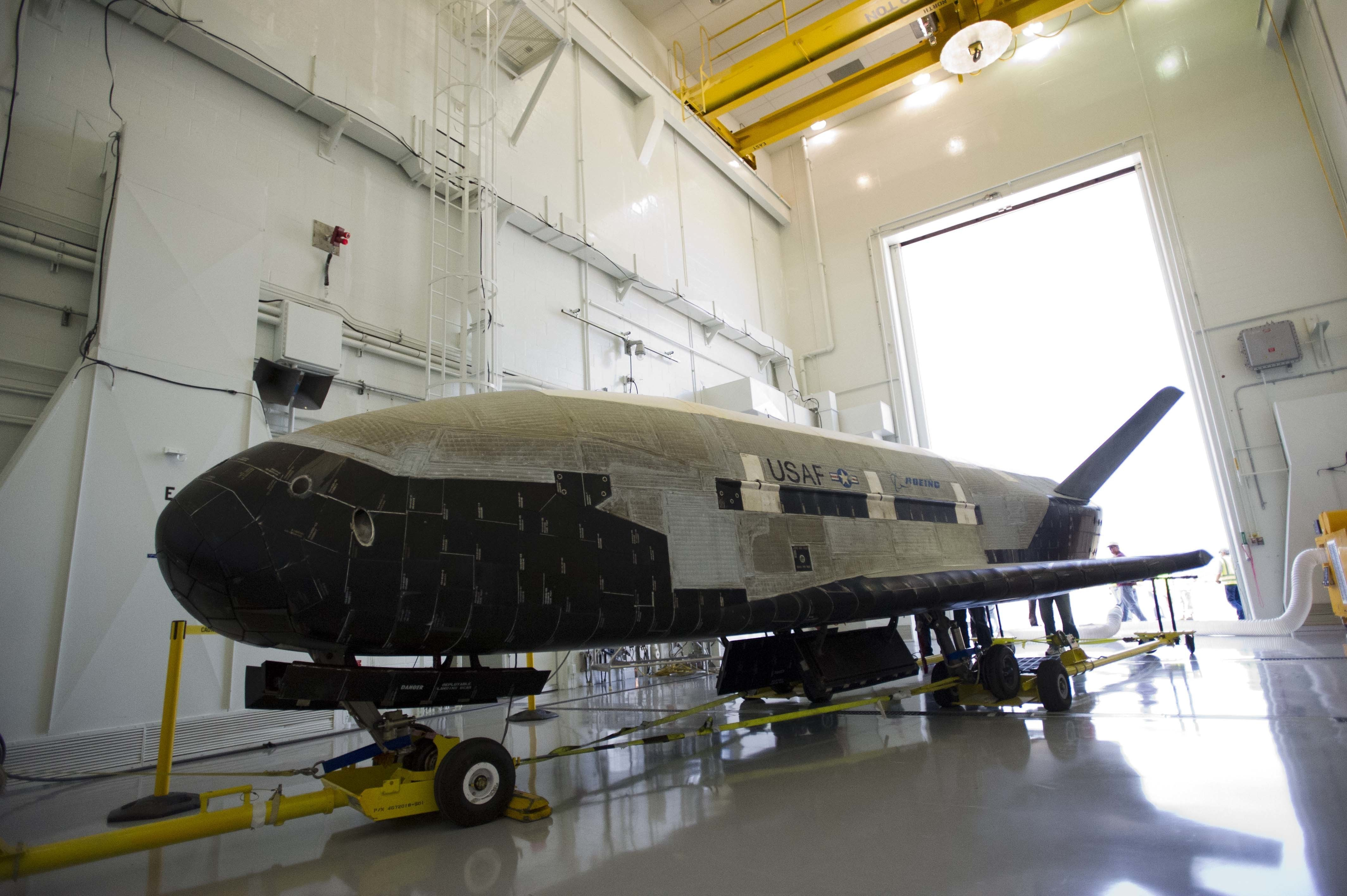
- The X-37B back on Earth after completing OTV-2
- Mission type: Demonstration
- Operator: Air Force Space Command
- COSPAR ID: 2011-010A
- SATCAT no.: 37375
- Mission duration: 468 days, 13 hours, 2 minutes

Spacecraft properties
- Spacecraft type: Boeing X-37B
- Manufacturer: Boeing
- Launch mass: 5,400 kg (11,900 lb)
- Power: Deployable solar array, batteries

Start of mission
- Launch date: 5 March 2011, 22:46:00 UTC
- Rocket: Atlas V 501
- Launch site: Cape Canaveral SLC-41
- Contractor: United Launch Alliance

End of mission
- Landing date: 16 June 2012, 12:48:00 UTC
- Landing site: Vandenberg, Runway 12

Orbital parameters
- Reference system: Geocentric
- Regime: Low Earth
- Semi-major axis: 6,662 km (4,140 mi)
- Eccentricity: 0.0008
- Perigee altitude: 278.5 km (173.1 mi)
- Apogee altitude: 289.3 km (179.8 mi)
- Inclination: 41.9°
- Period: 90.2 min
- Mean motion: 15.96
- Epoch: 30 May 2012, 02:23:10 UTC

OTV-2 (also known as USA-226) was the first flight of the second Boeing X-37B, an American unmanned robotic vertical-takeoff, horizontal-landing spaceplane. It was launched aboard an Atlas V rocket from Cape Canaveral on 5 March 2011, and landed at Vandenberg Air Force Base on 16 June 2012. It operated in low Earth orbit. Its USA-226 mission designation is part of the USA series.

The spaceplane was operated by Air Force Space Command, which has not revealed the specific identity of the payload for the first flight. The Air Force stated only that the spacecraft would "demonstrate various experiments and allow satellite sensors, subsystems, components, and associated technology to be transported into space and back."

== Launch ==
OTV-2 was launched aboard an Atlas V rocket, tail number AV-026, on 5 March 2011 from Space Launch Complex 41 at Cape Canaveral Air Force Station in Florida. It was scheduled to launch on the previous day, 4 March, but weather prevented the launch on that day, forcing the reschedule to 5 March.

The launch was conducted by United Launch Alliance.

The X-37B spacecraft was originally intended to be deployed from the payload bay of a NASA Space Shuttle, but following the Columbia accident, it was transferred to a Delta II 7920, then subsequently transferred to the Atlas V following concerns over the X-37B's aerodynamic properties during launch.

Prior to the installation of the spacecraft, the Atlas rocket was moved to the launch pad and performed a wet dress rehearsal on 4 February 2011. It was returned to the Vertical Integration Facility the following day for final assembly.

== Mission ==
Most of the mission parameters for the first OTV-2 flight have not been disclosed. The Air Force stated the mission time would depend on progress of the craft's experiments during orbit. On 29 November 2011 a spokesperson for the Secretary of the Air Force announced the mission was extended beyond its original life expectancy, citing ongoing experimentation.

In addition to its unspecified payload, OTV-2 carried a folded solar panel in its cargo bay to power the spacecraft during its year and a half long mission.

=== Altitude and ground track resonance history ===
Time period	Periapsis (AMSL)	Apoapsis (AMSL)	Resonance (orbits:days)
2011 Mar 5 – 14	317 km (197 mi)	319 km (198 mi)	
2011 Mar 14 – 30	317 km (197 mi)	344 km (214 mi)	
2011 Mar 30 – 16 Jun	323 km (201 mi)	339 km (211 mi)	

Landing video of OTV-2 at Vandenberg AFB

== Landing ==
After completing its mission, OTV-2 deorbited, entered the atmosphere, and landed at Vandenberg Air Force Base on 16 June 2012 at 05:48 PT (12:48 GMT). OTV-2 is the third reusable spaceplane to perform an automated landing after returning from orbit, the first being the Soviet Buran spacecraft in 1988 and the second, its sister craft, the OTV-1.

== See also ==
- 2011 in spaceflight
- Lockheed Martin X-33
- USA-212
