= USA-288 =

United States Space Force military communications satellite constellation

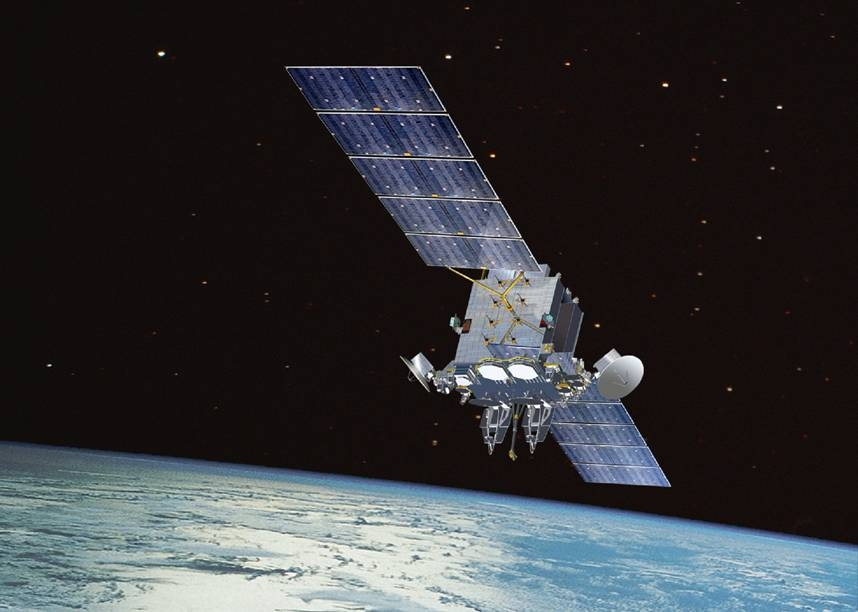
- Artist's impression of an AEHF-4 satellite
- Names: AEHF-4; Advanced Extremely High Frequency-4
- Mission type: Military communications
- Operator: United States Air Force / United States Space Force
- COSPAR ID: 2018-079A
- SATCAT no.: 43651
- Website: https://www.spaceforce.mil/
- Mission duration: 14 years (planned); 6 years, 4 months and 18 days (in progress)

Spacecraft properties
- Spacecraft: AEHF-4
- Bus: A2100M
- Manufacturer: Lockheed Martin Space
- Launch mass: 6,168 kg (13,598 lb)

Start of mission
- Launch date: 17 October 2018, 04:15 UTC
- Rocket: Atlas V 551 (AV-079)
- Launch site: Cape Canaveral, SLC-41
- Contractor: United Launch Alliance

Orbital parameters
- Reference system: Geocentric orbit
- Regime: Geosynchronous orbit

USA-288, also known as Advanced Extremely High Frequency 4 or AEHF-4, is a military communications satellite operated by the United States Air Force. It is the fourth of six satellite to be launched as part of the Advanced Extremely High Frequency program, which replaced the earlier Milstar system.

== Satellite description ==
The USA-288 satellite was constructed by Lockheed Martin Space, and is based on the A2100 satellite bus. The satellite has a mass of 6,168 kg (13,598 lb) and a design life of 14 years. It will be used to provide super high frequency (SHF) and extremely high frequency (EHF) communications for the United States Armed Forces, as well as those of the United Kingdom, the Netherlands, and Canada.

== Launch ==
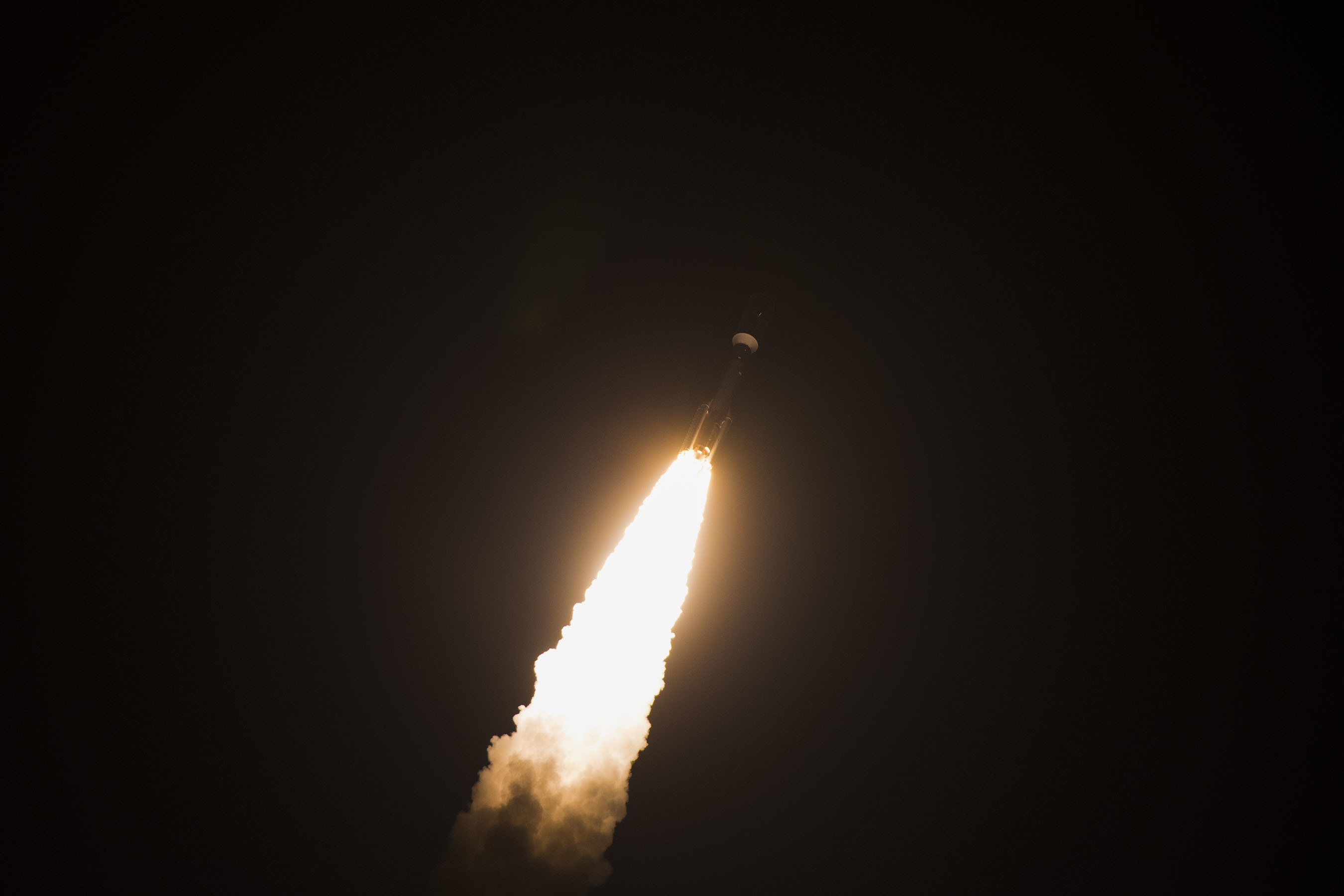
Launch of AEHF-4 on an Atlas V

USA-288 was launched by United Launch Alliance, aboard an Atlas V 551 flying from SLC-41 at the Cape Canaveral Air Force Station (CCAFS). The launch occurred at 04:15 UTC on 17 October 2018, placing the satellite in a parking orbit of 176 kilometers by 485 kilometers. A second burn placed the satellite into a geostationary transfer orbit (GTO) with a perigee of 202 km (126 mi), an apogee of 22,578 km (14,029 mi), and 25.9° inclination. A third and final burn, designed to minimize the amount of orbit raising required by the satellite, placed AEHF-4 in a 12.8° inclination orbit with a perigee of 8,914 kilometers and an apogee of 35,300 kilometers. The satellite was successfully deployed in this orbit about three and a half hours after launch.

== See also ==
- 2018 in spaceflight
