= USA-292 =

United States Space Force military communications satellite constellation

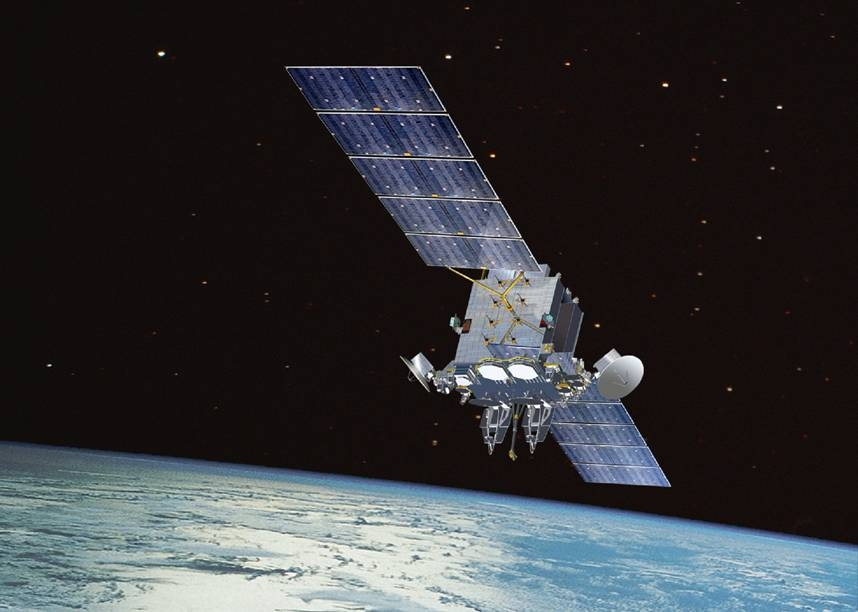
- Artist's impression of an AEHF-5 satellite
- Names: AEHF-5; Advanced Extremely High Frequency-5
- Mission type: Military communications
- Operator: United States Space Force
- COSPAR ID: 2019-051A
- SATCAT no.: 44481
- Website: https://www.spaceforce.mil/
- Mission duration: 14 years (planned); 6 years, 5 months and 21 days (in progress)

Spacecraft properties
- Spacecraft: AEHF-5
- Bus: A2100M
- Manufacturer: Lockheed Martin Space
- Launch mass: 6,168 kg (13,598 lb)

Start of mission
- Launch date: 8 August 2019, 10:13 UTC
- Rocket: Atlas V 551 (AV-083)
- Launch site: Cape Canaveral, SLC-41
- Contractor: United Launch Alliance

Orbital parameters
- Reference system: Geocentric orbit
- Regime: Geosynchronous orbit

USA-292, also known as Advanced Extremely High Frequency 5 or AEHF-5, is a military communications satellite operated by the United States Space Force. It is the fifth of six satellites to be launched as part of the Advanced Extremely High Frequency program, which replaced the earlier Milstar system.

== Satellite description ==
The USA-292 satellite was constructed by Lockheed Martin Space, and is based on the A2100 satellite bus. The satellite has a mass of 6,168 kg (13,598 lb) and a design life of 14 years. It will be used to provide super high frequency (SHF) and extremely high frequency (EHF) communications for the United States Armed Forces, as well as those of the United Kingdom, the Netherlands, and Canada.

== Launch ==
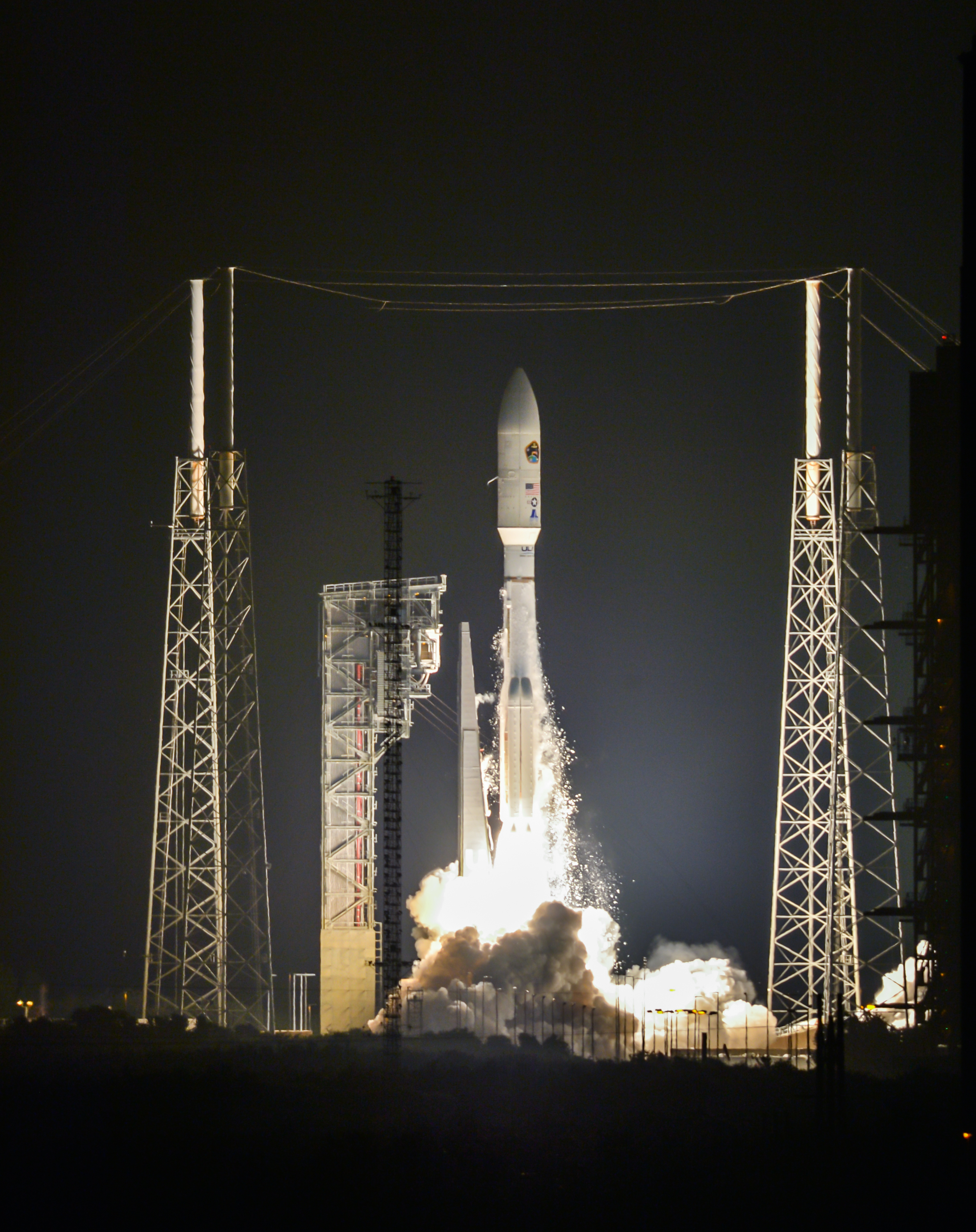
Launch of AEHF-5 on an Atlas V

USA-292 was launched by United Launch Alliance, aboard an Atlas V 551 flying from SLC-41 at the Cape Canaveral Air Force Station (CCAFS). The launch occurred at 10:13 UTC on 8 August 2019, placing the satellite into a Geostationary transfer orbit (GTO) with a perigee of 14,434 km (7,794 nmi), an apogee of 35,250 km (19,030 nmi), and 9.95° inclination. The satellite was successfully deployed in this orbit about five and a half hours after launch.

== TDO-1 satellite ==
Alongside AEHF-5, the U.S. Air Force Space and Missile Systems Center launched an experimental 12U cubesat known as TDO-1 (Technology Demonstration Orbiter, COSPAR 2019-051B, SATCAT 44482). The satellite was deployed prior to AEHF-5, from a dispenser on the aft of the Centaur upper stage into an orbit with a perigee of 208 km (129 mi) and an apogee of 35,264 km (19,041 nmi). TDO-1 deorbited 30 December 2022.

== See also ==
- 2019 in spaceflight
