= Titan-Centaur =

Titan-Centaur refers to the combination of a Titan rocket with a Centaur upper stage. Specifically, it may refer to:

- Titan IIIE
- Titan IV
