= USA-235 =

United States Space Force military communications satellite constellation

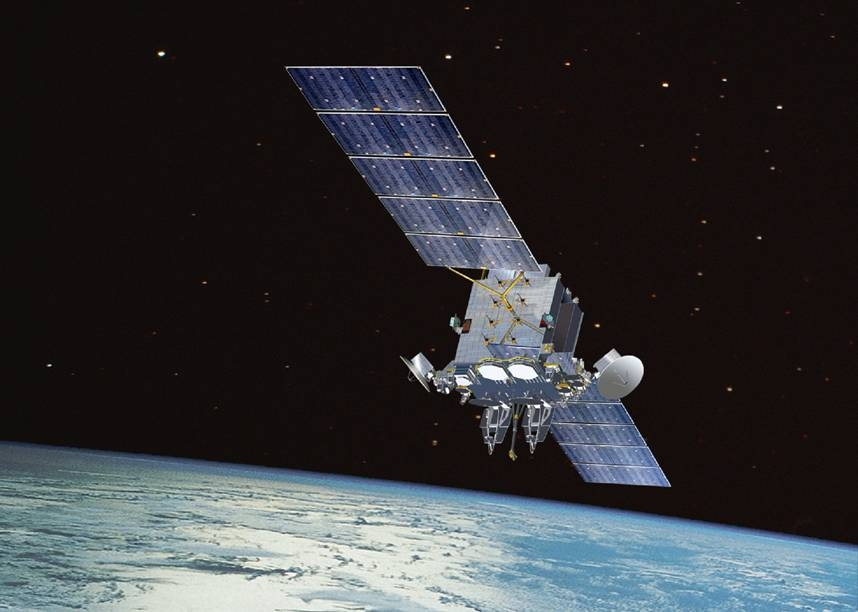
- Artist's impression of an AEHF-2 satellite
- Names: AEHF-2; Advanced Extremely High Frequency-2
- Mission type: Military communications
- Operator: United States Air Force / United States Space Force
- COSPAR ID: 2012-019A
- SATCAT no.: 38254
- Website: https://www.spaceforce.mil/
- Mission duration: 14 years (planned); 12 years, 10 months and 2 days (in progress)

Spacecraft properties
- Spacecraft: AEHF-2
- Bus: A2100M
- Manufacturer: Lockheed Martin Space
- Launch mass: 6,168 kg (13,598 lb)

Start of mission
- Launch date: 4 May 2012, 18:24 UTC
- Rocket: Atlas V 531 (AV-031)
- Launch site: Cape Canaveral, SLC-41
- Contractor: United Launch Alliance

Orbital parameters
- Reference system: Geocentric orbit
- Regime: Geosynchronous orbit

USA-235, also known as Advanced Extremely High Frequency 2 or AEHF-2, is a military communications satellite operated by the United States Air Force. It is the second of six satellite to be launched as part of the Advanced Extremely High Frequency program, which replaced the earlier Milstar system.

== Satellite description ==
The USA-235 satellite was constructed by Lockheed Martin Space, and is based on the A2100 satellite bus. The satellite has a mass of 6,168 kg (13,598 lb) and a design life of 14 years. It will be used to provide super high frequency (SHF) and extremely high frequency (EHF) communications for the United States Armed Forces, as well as those of the United Kingdom, the Netherlands, and Canada.

== Launch ==
USA-235 was launched by United Launch Alliance, aboard an Atlas V 531 flying from Space Launch Complex 41 (SLC-41) at the Cape Canaveral Air Force Station (CCAFS). The launch occurred at 18:24 UTC on 4 May 2012, first placing the satellite in a parking orbit of 185 kilometers by 905 kilometers. A second burn placed the satellite into a geostationary transfer orbit (GTO) with a perigee of 225 km (140 mi), an apogee of 50,031 km (31,088 mi), and 20.6° inclination. The satellite was successfully deployed in this orbit 51 minutes after launch.

== See also ==
- 2012 in spaceflight
