= SMART-T =

SMART-T, short for "secure, mobile, anti-jam, reliable, tactical-terminal," is a communications terminal used by the United States armed forces (mainly the U.S. Army).

== Purpose ==
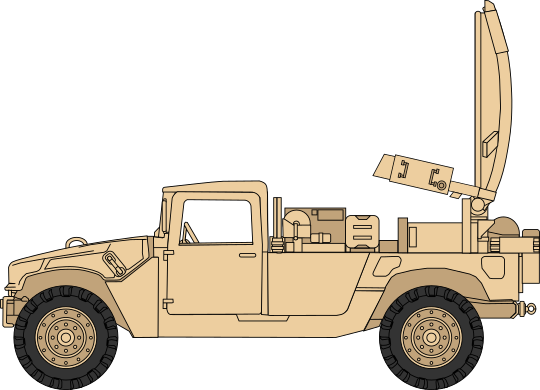
AN/TSC-154

The SMART–T provides services such as:

- Soldiers can send text, data, voice and video communications beyond their area of operations without worrying that the information will fall into the hands of enemy forces.
- Soldiers can extend the range of their network in such a manner that communications cannot be jammed, detected, or intercepted.

The US Army identifies the SMART-T as the AN/TSC-154.

Developed in the early 1990s, the SMART-T provides beyond-LOS (line-of-sight) range extensions for division-level, brigade-level, and battalion-level elements. The SMART-T provides protected command and control communications through use of EHF (extremely high frequency) waveforms over military satellite constellations.

As of February 2008, 314 SMART-T units were in place, with 227 units being placed in use by brigade combat teams, Stryker brigade combat teams, division levels, and corps levels. The remaining units can be found in use in the White House, the Pentagon, the US Air Force, and US Marines. An upgrade (expected starting fiscal year of 2010), will improve the extremely high frequency capabilities to Advanced Extremely High Frequency.
