= Sphinx (satellite) =

American test satellite

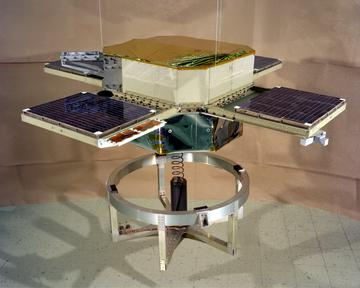
- The Sphinx satellite in 1972

Spacecraft properties
- Spacecraft type: Satellite
- Manufacturer: NASA
- Dry mass: 113 kg

Start of mission
- Launch date: February 11, 1974
- Rocket: Titan IIIE Centaur
- Launch site: Cape Canaveral Space Launch Complex 41

End of mission
- Destroyed: T+748 seconds

SPHINX (short for Space Plasma High Voltage Interaction Experiment) was a test satellite developed by NASA as the payload for the first Titan IIIE Centaur rocket. It was launched on February 11, 1974 alongside the Viking Dynamic Simulator (VDS), a dummy model of the Viking space probe that would eventually be sent to Mars.

== Background ==
The satellite was designed to test high voltage electrical components and their interaction with plasma in the vacuum of space. The satellite was spin stabilized, and was to be ejected from the VDS before completing its data readings.

== Launch and destruction ==
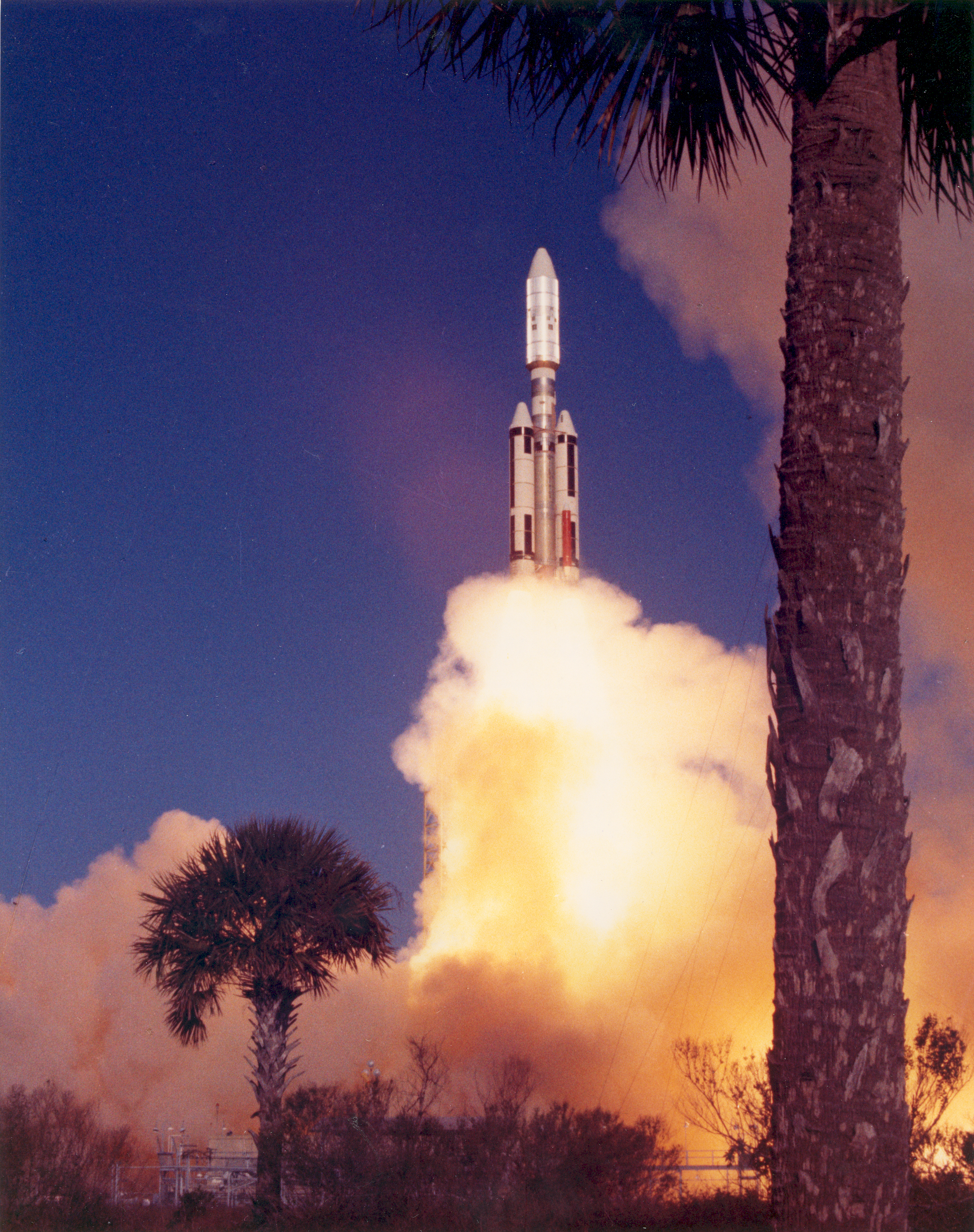
The launch of the satellite in the Titan IIIE rocket

The satellite was launched on the original test flight of the Titan IIIE-Centaur rocket, and was intended to be deployed after the third burn of the second stage Centaur engine with the payload in orbit. However, the Centaur engine failed to ignite and the ship began to rapidly fall. At this point, the range safety officer ordered the destruction of the rocket, destroying the satellite and VDS with it.

Two additional satellites named Sphinx B and C were planned to be launched in the early 1980s, with Sphinx B being a repeat of the destroyed satellite.

== See also ==
- Titan IIIE
- Centaur
- 1974 in spaceflight
