= USA-214 =

United States Space Force military communications satellite constellation

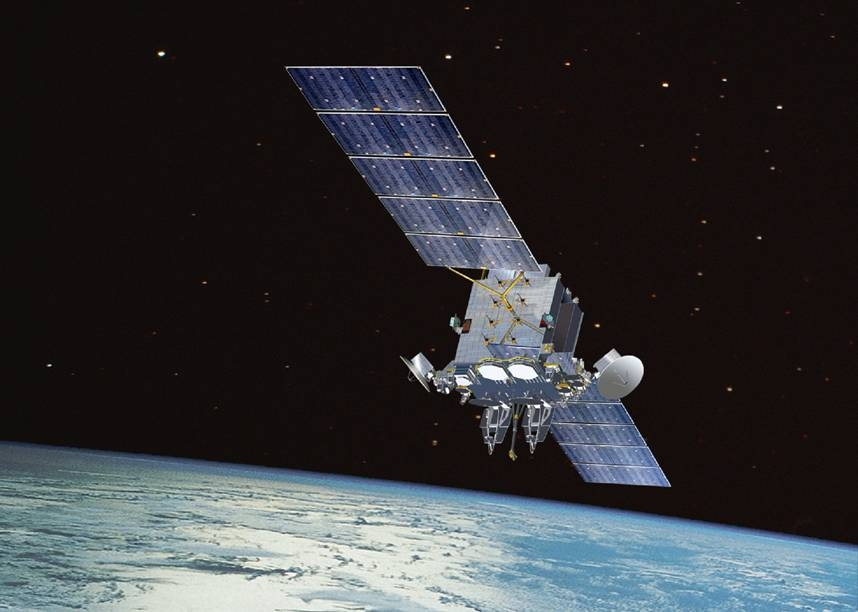
- Artist's impression of an AEHF-1 satellite
- Names: AEHF-1; Advanced Extremely High Frequency-1
- Mission type: Military communications
- Operator: United States Air Force / United States Space Force
- COSPAR ID: 2010-039A
- SATCAT no.: 36868
- Website: https://www.spaceforce.mil/
- Mission duration: 14 years (planned); 15 years, 5 months and 15 days (in progress)

Spacecraft properties
- Spacecraft: AEHF-1
- Bus: A2100M
- Manufacturer: Lockheed Martin Space
- Launch mass: 6,168 kg (13,598 lb)

Start of mission
- Launch date: 14 August 2010, 11:07:00 UTC
- Rocket: Atlas V 531 (AV-019)
- Launch site: Cape Canaveral, SLC-41
- Contractor: United Launch Alliance

Orbital parameters
- Reference system: Geocentric orbit
- Regime: Geosynchronous orbit

USA-214, also known as Advanced Extremely High Frequency-1 or AEHF-1, is a military communications satellite operated by the United States Air Force. It is the first of six satellites to be launched as part of the Advanced Extremely High Frequency program, which will replace the earlier Milstar system.

== Satellite description ==
The USA-214 satellite was constructed by Lockheed Martin Space, and is based on the A2100 satellite bus. The satellite has a mass of 6,168 kg (13,598 lb) and a design life of 14 years. It will be used to provide super high frequency (SHF) and extremely high frequency (EHF) communications for the United States Armed Forces, as well as those of the United Kingdom, the Netherlands, and Canada.

== Launch ==
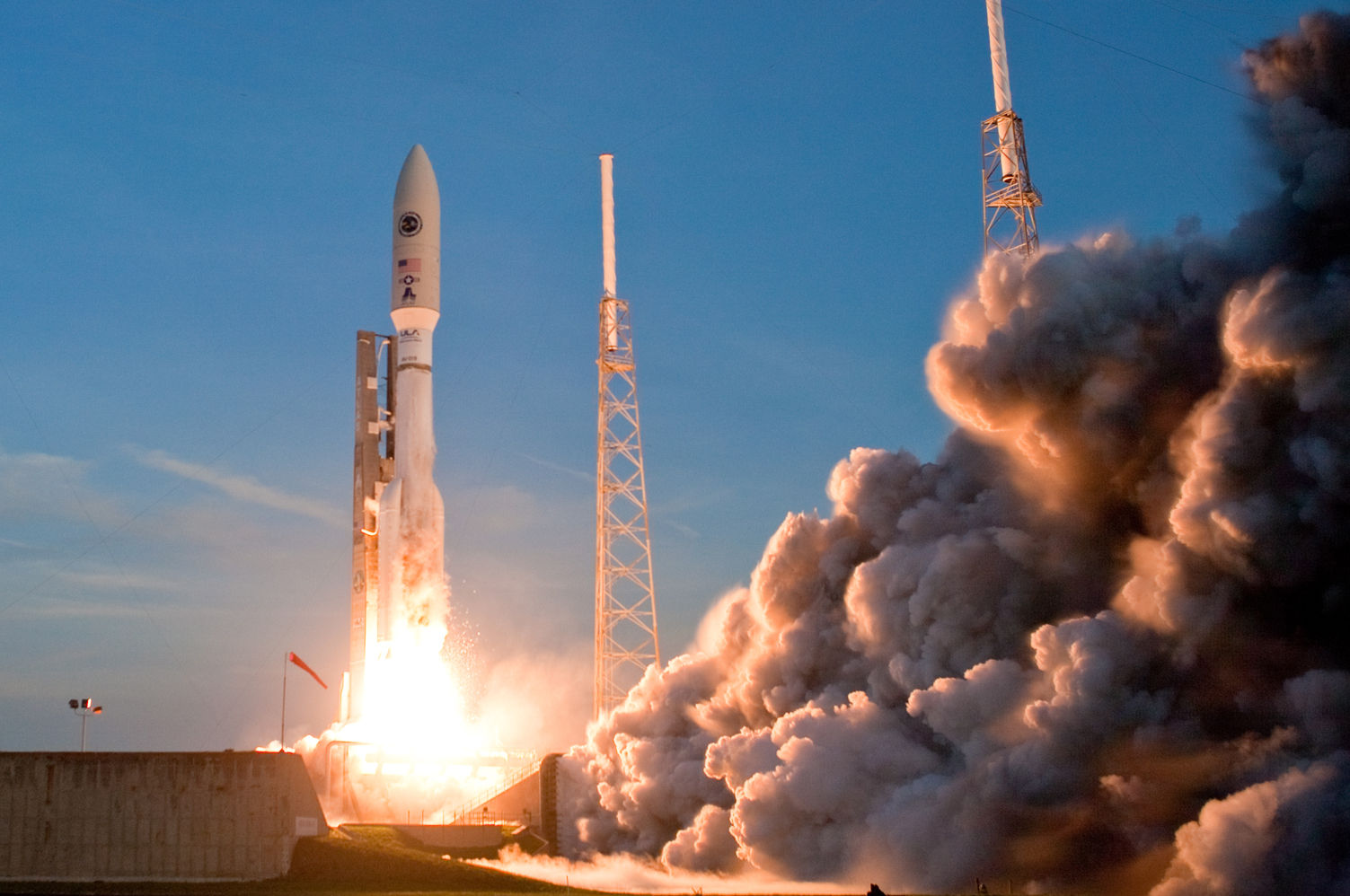
AEHF-1 was launched on an Atlas V.

Though initially scheduled for launch on 30 July 2010, delays with the launch vehicle pushed flight back to 10 August 2010, and finally to 14 August 2010.

USA-214 was launched by United Launch Alliance, aboard an Atlas V 531 flying from Space Launch Complex-41 (SLC-41) at the Cape Canaveral Air Force Station (CCAFS). The launch occurred at 11:07:00 UTC on 14 August 2010, and resulted in the satellite being deployed successfully into a geostationary transfer orbit (GTO) with a perigee of 221 km (137 mi), an apogee of 50,179 km (31,180 mi), and 22.2° Orbital inclination.

== Anomaly ==
The satellite was intended to maneuver from the transfer orbit into which it was launched to its operational geosynchronous orbit by means of a liquid apogee engine (LAE) and several Hall-effect thrusters, a process which normally takes 105 days. However, the satellite's Liquid Apogee Engine malfunctioned shortly after ignition on both its first burn on 15 August 2010 and a second attempt on 17 August 2010, and it was declared inoperable.

To solve the problem, the perigee altitude was raised to 4,700 km (2,900 mi) using twelve firings of the smaller Reaction Engine Assembly thrusters, originally intended for attitude control during LAE maneuvers. From this altitude, the solar arrays were deployed and the orbit was raised toward the operational orbit over the course of nine months using the 0.27 Newton Hall effect thruster, a form of electric propulsion which is highly efficient, but produces very low thrust and is therefore very slow.

The problem with the liquid apogee engine was later blamed on a piece of cloth accidentally left in a fuel line leading up to the engine while the line was taken apart for repair during the manufacture of the satellite. The cloth was likely placed in the line to prevent impurities from entering the fuel line and did not get removed when the line was put back together.

== See also ==
- 2010 in spaceflight
