= Cape Canaveral Space Launch Complex 41 =

Rocket launch site in Florida, US

Space Launch Complex 41
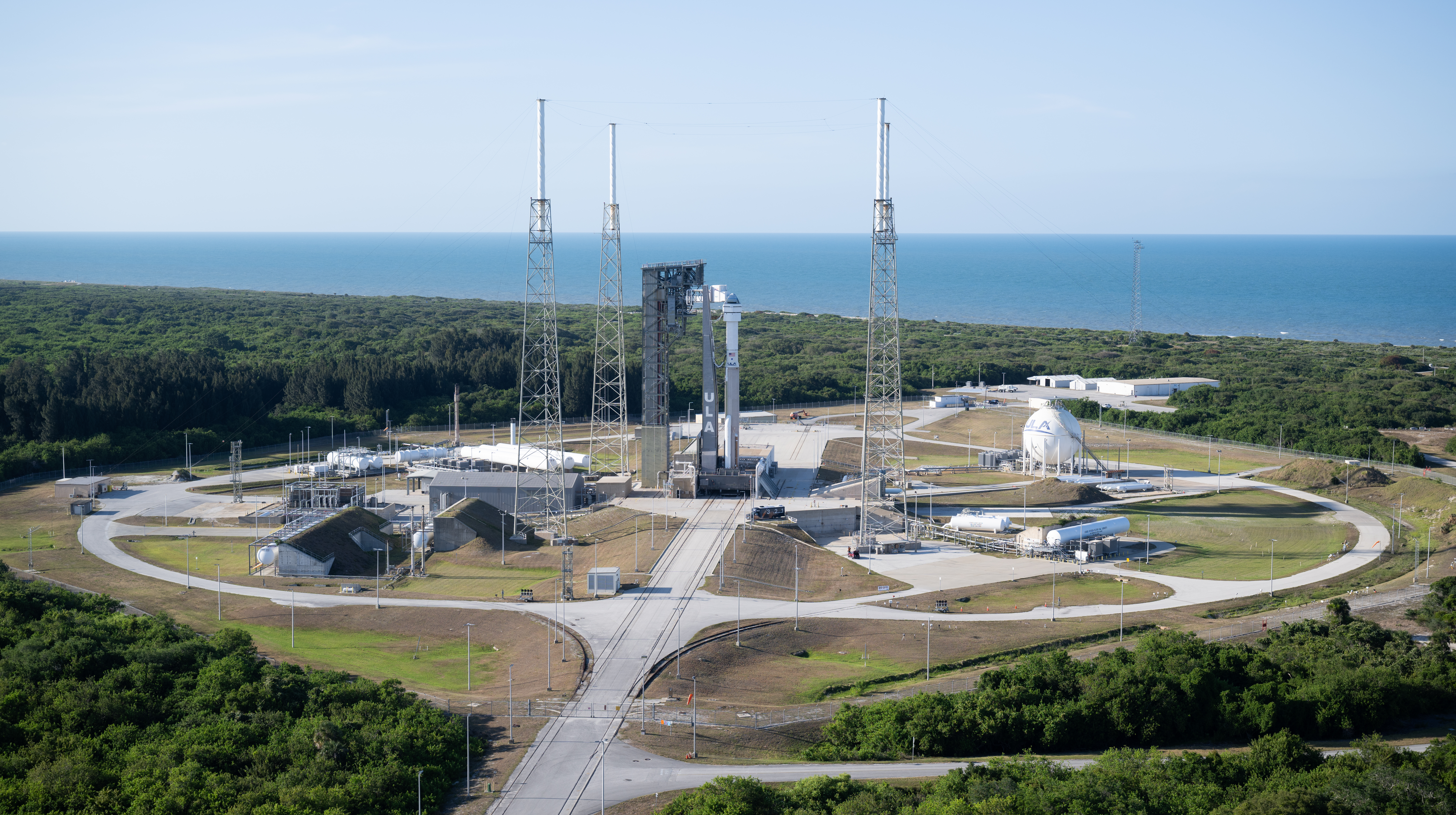
- An aerial view of SLC-41 prior to the launch of the Boeing Crewed Flight Test
- Interactive map of Space Launch Complex 41
- Location: 28°35′00″N 80°34′59″W
- Time zone: UTC−05:00 (EST)
  - Summer (DST): UTC−04:00 (EDT)
- Short name: SLC-41
- Operator: United States Space Force (owner); United Launch Alliance (tenant)
- Total launches: 125
- Launch pad: 1
- Orbital inclination range: 28° - 57°
Launch history
- Status: Active
- First launch: 21 December 1965; Titan IIIC (LES-3 & 4)
- Last launch: 15 November 2026; Vulcan (LeoSat LV-01)
- Associated rockets: Current: Vulcan, Atlas V Retired: Titan IIIC, Titan IIIE, Titan IV

Space Launch Complex 41 (SLC-41), sometimes referred to as "Slick Forty-one," is one of two launch sites at the Integrate-Transfer-Launch Complex in Cape Canaveral Space Force Station, Florida. Originally built as Launch Complex 41 (LC-41), it and the neighboring Space Launch Complex 40 were designed for the United States Air Force's Titan III rocket program, where it launched the Titan IIIC in the 1960s and the Titan IIIE in the 1970s. In the 1990s, the Air Force and Martin Marietta upgraded the pad for use by the Titan III's successor, the Titan IV.

During the early 2000s, SLC-41 underwent modifications by Lockheed Martin in order to support the launch operations of the Atlas V. It was later transferred to United Launch Alliance (ULA)—a joint venture between Lockheed Martin and Boeing—who continues to use the pad today for launches of the Atlas V and its successor, Vulcan Centaur.

== History ==
=== Titan IIIC and IIIE (1965–1977) ===
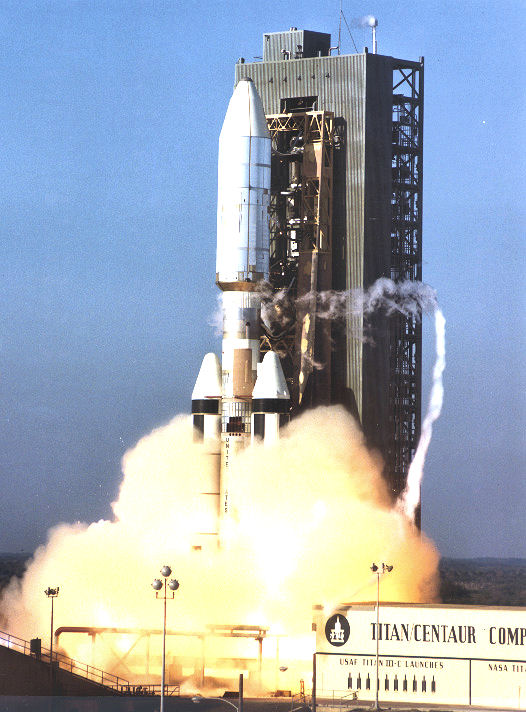
LC-41 in September 1977, launching a Titan IIIE with Voyager 1

Launch Complex 41 was originally built as part of the Integrate-Transfer-Launch Complex (ITL), intended to launch Titan III rockets with solid rocket boosters in a method to enable a rapid launch rate. The ITL consisted of a Titan assembly facility at the Vertical Integration Building (demolished in 2006), an SRB attachment facility at the Solid Motor Assembly Building (now used by SpaceX to process Falcon 9 payloads), and two pads at Launch Complex 40 (LC-40, now SLC-40) and LC-41, all connected by the first rail line at the Cape. The facilities were completed in 1964, and the first launch from LC-41 was of a Titan IIIC carrying four separate payloads on December 21, 1965.

Throughout the remainder of the 1960s, LC-41 was used to launch 10 Titan IIICs, the entirety of them being military payloads such as Vela nuclear detection satellites and Lincoln Experimental Satellites. The last Titan IIIC launch from LC-41 took place in May 1969, launching Vela satellites OPS-6909 and OPS-6911, the later of which would detect a double flash in the southern Indian Ocean and instigate the Vela incident ten years later. All remaining launches of the rocket were made from LC-40.

In the early 1970s, LC-41 underwent a modification to launch the Titan IIIE, which replaced the Transtage upper stage of the IIIC with a Centaur. With the exception of its inaugural flight in February 1974, every launch from the pad in this era contained a NASA payload. Those satellites were the two Helios probes sent to study the Sun (setting a proximity record only broken by the Parker Solar Probe), the two Viking probes sent to orbit and land on Mars, and the two Voyager spacecraft that flew by Jupiter, Saturn, Uranus, and Neptune. The Titan III facility at Complex 41 was deactivated in late 1977, following September's launch of Voyager 1.

=== Titan IV (1989–1999) ===
In 1986, the existing mobile service tower and umbilical tower at LC-41 were both stripped down to their main structural components as part of a renovation conducted by Titan manufacturer Martin Marietta. This was done as part of their "tear-out and refurbish" contracts, which modified and prepared the ITL for its new rocket configuration: LC-40 would get converted to use the civilian-based Commercial Titan III, while LC-41 would be used for the military-focused Titan IV. Additionally, Titan IV processing would go through the newly-constructed Solid Motor Assembly Readiness Facility (now used by ULA in the assembly of Vulcan Centaur) prior to launch. The maiden flight of the Titan IV occurred on June 14, 1989, carrying USA-39 for the United States Air Force. Similarly to most other Titan launches, all 10 launches of the Titan IV from LC-41 were classified military payloads, most going into geostationary transfer orbit.

The Titan family of the 1980s and 1990s was marred by its price in the eyes of commercial customers, who instead opted to use cheaper launch vehicles like Delta II and Ariane 4. Following Lockheed's merger with Martin Marietta in 1995, Lockheed Martin eventually decided to begin the process of retiring the Titan program in favor of their cheaper Atlas line. With any remaining Titan IV launches to be made from LC-40, the last Titan launch from LC-41 was on April 9, 1999, when a Titan IVB launched the USA-142 early warning satellite. The IUS upper stage failed to separate, leaving the payload stranded in a useless GTO orbit.

=== Atlas V and Vulcan Centaur (2002–present) ===
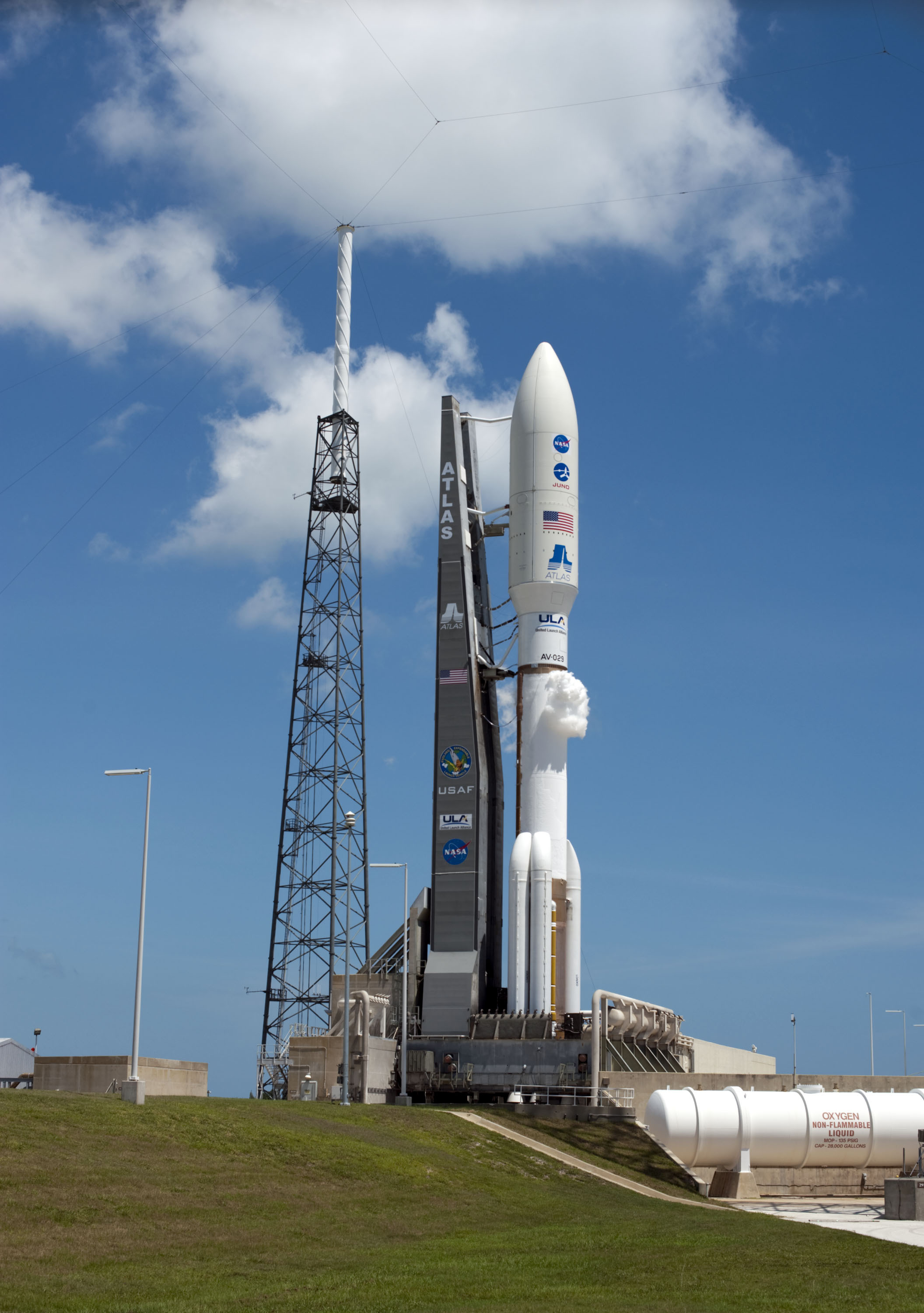
SLC-41 in 2011, carrying an Atlas V with Juno onboard

After the last Titan launch, LC-41 was renovated by Lockheed Martin and the Air Force to support the Atlas V as part of the Evolved Expendable Launch Vehicle program, getting rechristened as SLC-41 in the process. The old launch tower and mobile service structure were demolished, while the new Vertical Integration Facility was built for the assembly of the new launch vehicle. Additionally, the rail lines going towards the pad were renovated to support the assembly and transportation of the Atlas V and it's mobile launcher platform for liftoff. SLC-41 was the site of the first-ever Atlas V launch on August 21, 2002, lifting Hot Bird 6, a Eutelsat geostationary communications spacecraft built around a Spacebus 3000B3 bus.

Over the years of the Atlas V era, SLC-41 was used to launch various noteworthy payloads for various agencies such as NASA and the Air Force. These include the Mars Reconnaissance Orbiter in August 2005, the New Horizons spacecraft to Pluto in January 2006, the Juno mission to Jupiter in August 2011, and two of the Mars rover missions; Mars Science Laboratory in November 2011, and Mars 2020 in July 2020. Other notable payloads to be mentioned are various launches of the Boeing X-37B for the Air Force throughout the 2010s, and a couple of Cygnus flights to the International Space Station in 2015 and 2016 following the failure of Cygnus Orb 3.

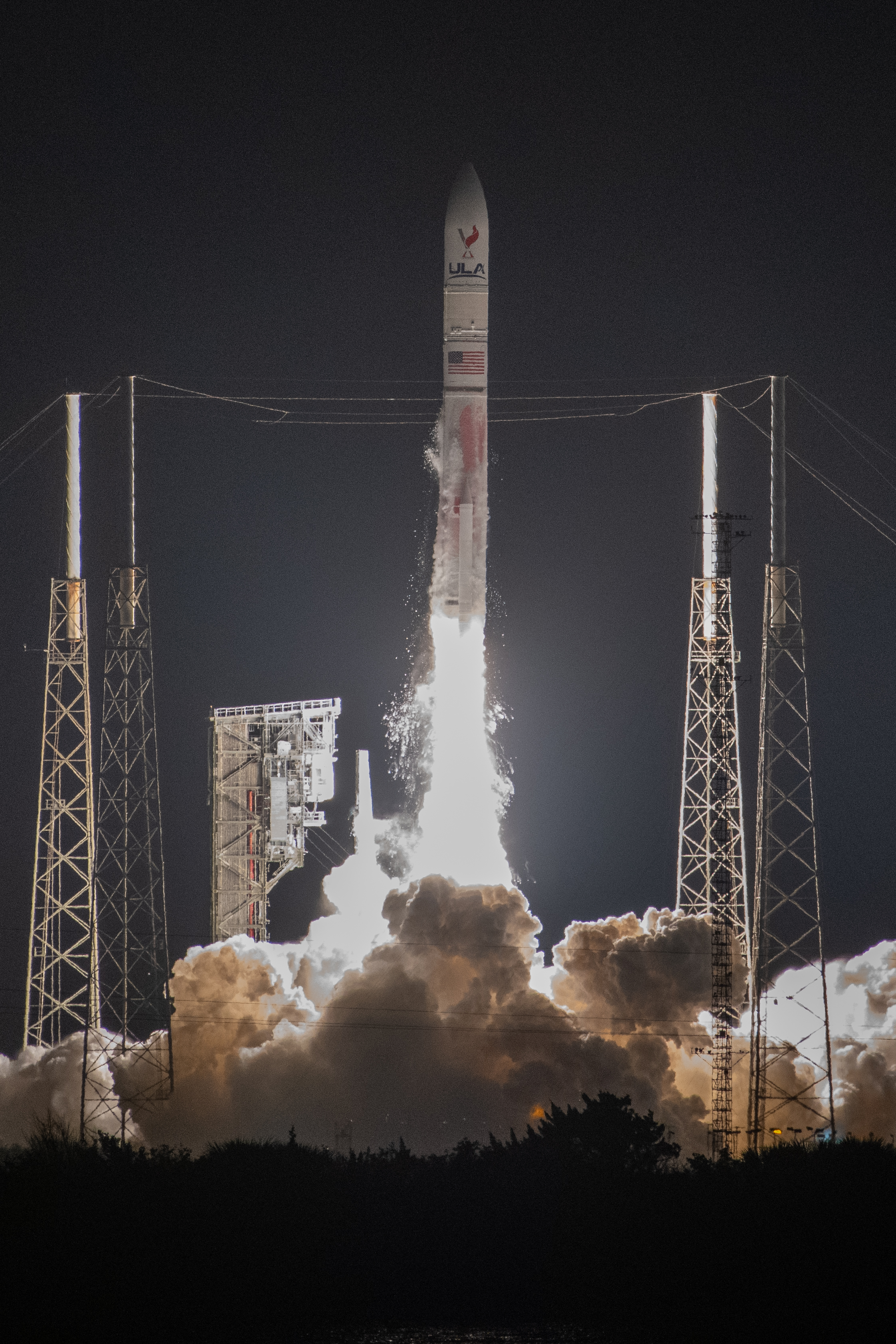
SLC-41 in 2024, launching the maiden flight of Vulcan Centaur

In 2005, it was announced that a joint venture would form between Lockheed Martin and Boeing that would combine Atlas V operations at SLC-41 with Delta II and Delta IV operations at SLC-17 and SLC-37 respectively, following issues with profit abounding with competition between the two. This transfer in operation was made official in December 2006, with the formation of United Launch Alliance. The first launch from SLC-41 under ULA came in March 2007 with a variety of Department of Defense payloads lifting off from an Atlas V.

In 2011, the idea of rebuilding a launch tower at SLC-41 began to get proposed following Sierra Nevada Corporation and Boeing's decisions to have the Atlas V launch their respective Dream Chaser and CST-100 Starliner spacecraft into orbit. Proposals turned into plans in 2014, following Boeing's winning of a contract as part of NASA's Commercial Crew Program to launch astronauts to the ISS. Pad modifications at SLC-41 began in September 2015 to support human spaceflight to support Starliner, including the addition of a launch service tower to provide access to the capsule for "pre-launch processing, crew access, and safety egress systems should the need to evacuate Starliner on the pad occur". The first launch utilizing the newly-built launch tower came on December 20, 2019 with the launch of the Boeing Orbital Flight Test. This was followed up with the first crewed launch to be made from SLC-41, which occurred on June 5, 2024 with the Boeing Crew Flight Test and carried astronauts Barry Wilmore and Sunita Williams into orbit. This was the first crewed launch from Cape Canaveral Space Force Station since Apollo 7 in 1968 and made SLC-41 the seventh pad in the Cape Canaveral area to launch astronauts into space. (Note: In chronological order, it joins: LC-5 (Mercury-Redstone 3), LC-14 (Mercury-Atlas 6), LC-19 (Gemini 3), LC-34 (Apollo 7), LC-39A (Apollo 8), and LC-39B (Apollo 10). Following the launch of CFT-1, it was also joined by SLC-40 (SpaceX Crew-9) in September 2024.)

During the late 2010s and the early 2020s, SLC-41, the VIF, and the SMARF (which was renamed to the Spaceflight Processing Operations Center in 2019) underwent minor modifications to support Vulcan Centaur, the successor to the Atlas V and Delta IV. This was in part due to the Atlas V using the Russian-built RD-180 as its first stage engine, which drew concern among Congress following the 2014 annexation of Crimea and the Russian invasion of Ukraine in 2022. As the Atlas V still had numerous pending launches (mainly for Starliner and Kuiper satellites as payloads), SLC-41's modifications were made to allow both rockets to take off from the pad, rather than a more traditional renovation like what was seen at Vandenberg's SLC-3E. The first Vulcan launch to be made from the pad occurred on January 8, 2024, carrying Peregine Mission One to the Moon as part of NASA's Commercial Lunar Payload Services.

To support a higher launch cadence, particularly for Amazon’s Project Kuiper constellation, ULA is expanding its infrastructure at SLC-41. The company acquired the former Solid Motor Assembly and Readiness Facility (SMARF), originally built for the Titan IVB program, and repurposed it as the Spaceflight Processing Operations Center (SPOC). Initially used as a warehouse for construction of two mobile launcher platforms for Vulcan, the SPOC is now being converted into a second integration facility, designated VIF-A (Amazon Vertical Integration Facility). Planned upgrades include raising the roof by 45 feet, adding storage space for a mobile launcher platform, and creating an offline vertical integration (OVI) cell to allow parallel processing of the Centaur V upper stage and Vulcan booster prior to stacking. Once VIF-A is operational, the existing VIF will be redesignated VIF-G (Government Vertical Integration Facility) and primarily support national security launches.

== Launch history ==
Launch sites at Cape Canaveral Space Force Station and Kennedy Space Center
Active pads
Inactive leased pads
Inactive unleased pads
Repurposed pads, not used for launches
1 LC-39B
2 LC-39A
3 LC-48
4 SLC-41
5 SLC-40
6 LC-47
7 SLC-37
8 LC-34
9 SLC-20
10 LC-19
11 LC-16
12 LC-15
13 LC-14
14 LC-13 (LZ-2)
15 LC-12
16 LC-11
17 LC-36
18 LC-1, LC-2, LC-3, and LC-4
19 SLC-46
20 LC-21 and LC-22
21 LC-31 and LC-32
22 LC-18
23 SLC-17
24 LC-26
25 LC-5 and LC-6
26 LC-30
27 LC-25
28 LC-29

=== Statistics ===
- Titan III-C
- Titan IIIE
- Titan IV
- Atlas V
- Vulcan Centaur

==== Titan III and IV ====
All launches operated by the United States Air Force.

No.	Date	Time (UTC)	Launch vehicle	S/N and configuration	Payload/mission	Result	Remarks
1	21 December 1965	14:00	Titan IIIC	3C-8	LES-3 and LES-4	Partial failure	First launch from LC-41. Valve issue in the Transtage led to stage failure during a burn, leaving payloads stuck in geostationary transfer orbit.
2	16 June 1966	14:00	Titan IIIC	3C-11	OPS-9311 to OPS-9317 (IDCSP)	Success	First successful launch from LC-41.
3	26 August 1966	14:00	Titan IIIC	3C-12	IDCSP × 7	Failure	Payload fairing failure occurred 73 seconds after launch, leading to range safety protocols being activated.
4	18 January 1967	14:19	Titan IIIC	3C-13	OPS-9321 to OPS-9328 (IDCSP)	Success	
5	28 April 1967	10:01	Titan IIIC	3C-10	OPS-6638 and OPS-6679 (Vela)	Success	
6	1 July 1967	13:15	Titan IIIC	3C-14	OPS-9331 to OPS-9334 (IDCSP) and LES-5	Success	
7	13 June 1968	14:03	Titan IIIC	3C-16	OPS-9341 to OPS-9348 (IDCSP)	Success	
8	26 September 1968	07:37	Titan IIIC	3C-5	LES-6	Success	
9	9 February 1969	21:09	Titan IIIC	3C-17	TACSAT-1	Success	
10	23 May 1969	07:57	Titan IIIC	3C-15	OPS-6909 and OPS-6911 (Vela)	Success	Final Titan IIIC launch from LC-41, with all remaining launches being conducted from LC-40. OPS-6911 was later made notable for causing the Vela incident in 1979, after detecting a double flash in the southern Indian Ocean.
11	11 February 1974	13:48	Titan IIIE	23E-1	Sphinx	Failure	Maiden flight of the Titan IIIE and first civilian payload to launch from LC-41. Centaur turbopump malfunction 12 minutes in led to RSO protocol.
12	10 December 1974	07:11	Titan IIIE	23E-2	Helios-A	Success	First in a pair of heliophysics satellites aimed at close-up studies of the Sun. First launch into heliocentric orbit from a Titan rocket and from LC-41.
13	20 August 1975	21:22	Titan IIIE	23E-4	Viking 1	Success	First launch of the Viking program, aimed at studying Mars from orbit and from the surface. First spacecraft to successfully land on Mars. First Titan flight and launch from LC-41 to another celestial body.
14	9 September 1975	18:39	Titan IIIE	23E-3	Viking 2	Success	Second and final launch of the Viking program, aimed at studying Mars from orbit and from the surface.
15	15 January 1976	05:34	Titan IIIE	23E-5	Helios-B	Success	Second in a pair of heliophysics satellites aimed at close-up studies of the Sun. Set a proximity record to the Sun that stood until the Parker Solar Probe in 2018.
16	20 August 1977	14:29	Titan IIIE	23E-7	Voyager 2	Success	First launch of the Voyager program, aimed at studying the outer planets. First spacecraft to visit Uranus and Neptune, and second spacecraft to enter the interstellar medium.
17	5 September 1977	12:56	Titan IIIE	23E-6	Voyager 1	Success	Second and final launch of the Voyager program, aimed at studying the outer planets. First spacecraft to enter the interstellar medium. Last flight of the Titan IIIE and last Titan III flight from LC-41.
18	14 June 1989	13:18	Titan IV	K-1, 402A / IUS	USA-39 (DSP-14)	Success	Maiden flight of the Titan IV.
19	8 June 1990	05:21	Titan IV	K-4, 405A	USA-59 to USA-62 (SLDCOM and NOSS)	Success	First Titan IV flight without any third stage.
20	13 November 1990	00:37	Titan IV	K-6, 402A / IUS	USA-65 (DSP-15)	Success	
21	3 May 1994	15:55	Titan IV	K-7, 401A / Centaur	USA-103 (Trumpet)	Success	
22	27 August 1994	08:58	Titan IV	K-9, 401A / Centaur	USA-105 (Mercury)	Success	
23	10 July 1995	12:38	Titan IV	K-19, 401A / Centaur	USA-112 (Trumpet)	Success	
24	24 April 1996	23:37	Titan IV	K-16, 401A / Centaur	USA-118 (Mercury)	Success	
25	8 November 1997	02:05	Titan IV	A-17, 401A / Centaur	NROL-4	Success	NRO launch. Trumpet satellite, also known as USA-136. First acknowledged National Reconnaissance Office flight from LC-41.
26	12 August 1998	11:30	Titan IV	A-20, 401A / Centaur	NROL-7	Failure	NRO launch. Mercury satellite, didn't receive a USA designation. Guidance system failure 40 seconds into launch resulted in loss of control, leading to RSO protocols.
27	9 April 1999	17:01	Titan IV	B-27, 402B / IUS	USA-142 (DSP-19)	Failure	Payload failed to separate from IUS. Final Titan IV flight and launch of a Titan rocket from LC-41, with all remaining flights of the family being conducted from LC-40, SLC-4E, and SLC-4W.

==== Pre-Vulcan Atlas V ====
All launches from 2002 to 2006 operated by Lockheed Martin. All launches since 2007 operated by United Launch Alliance.

No.	Date	Time (UTC)	Launch vehicle	Configuration	Payload/mission	Result	Remarks
28	21 August 2002	22:05	Atlas V	Atlas V 401	Hot Bird 6	Success	Maiden flight of the Atlas V and first launch as SLC-41. First flight of the Atlas V 400 configuration.
29	13 May 2003	22:10	Atlas V	Atlas V 401	Hellas Sat 2	Success	
30	17 July 2003	23:45	Atlas V	Atlas V 521	Rainbow-1	Success	First launch of the Atlas V 500 configuration, and first Atlas V launch with solid rocket boosters.
31	17 December 2004	12:07	Atlas V	Atlas V 521	AMC-16	Success	
32	11 March 2005	21:42	Atlas V	Atlas V 431	Inmarsat-4 F1	Success	
33	12 August 2005	11:43	Atlas V	Atlas V 401	Mars Reconnaissance Orbiter	Success	Part of the Mars Exploration Program, going to the titular planet. First Atlas V launch to another celestial body.
34	19 January 2006	19:00	Atlas V	Atlas V 551	New Horizons	Success	Part of the New Frontiers program, going to Pluto and the Kuiper belt. First spacecraft to visit Pluto and a Kuiper belt object, 486958 Arrokoth. First Atlas V launch with an RTG, and only Atlas V launch with a third stage, a Star 48B.
35	20 April 2006	20:27	Atlas V	Atlas V 411	Astra 1KR	Success	
36	9 March 2007	03:10	Atlas V	Atlas V 401	STP-1	Success	Rideshare mission conducted by the Department of Defense. First Atlas V mission for the DoD.
37	15 June 2007	15:12	Atlas V	Atlas V 401	NROL-30	Partial failure	NRO launch. Two Intruder satellites, sharing the designation USA-194. First classified mission for Atlas V. Centaur shut down early, leaving payload in a suboptimal orbit. NRO declared launch a success.
38	11 October 2007	00:22	Atlas V	Atlas V 421	WGS-1	Success	
39	10 December 2007	22:05	Atlas V	Atlas V 401	NROL-24	Success	NRO launch. Quasar satellite, also known as USA-198.
40	14 April 2008	20:12	Atlas V	Atlas V 421	ICO G1	Success	
41	4 April 2009	00:31	Atlas V	Atlas V 421	WGS-2	Success	
42	18 June 2009	21:32	Atlas V	Atlas V 401	Lunar Reconnaissance Orbiter and LCROSS	Success	Part of the Lunar Precursor Robotic Program, aimed at scouting the Moon as preparation for future crewed missions like the Artemis Program. Centaur was purposely impacted on the lunar surface as part of LCROSS's mission.
43	8 September 2009	21:35	Atlas V	Atlas V 401	PAN	Success	
44	23 November 2009	06:55	Atlas V	Atlas V 431	Intelsat 14	Success	
45	11 February 2010	15:23	Atlas V	Atlas V 401	Solar Dynamics Observatory	Success	Part of the Large Strategic Science Missions and the Living With a Star program, aimed at studying the Sun.
46	22 April 2010	23:52	Atlas V	Atlas V 501	X-37B OTV-1	Success	First flight of the Boeing X-37B.
47	14 August 2010	11:07	Atlas V	Atlas V 531	AEHF-1	Success	
48	5 March 2011	22:46	Atlas V	Atlas V 501	X-37B OTV-2	Success	Second flight of the X-37B.
49	7 May 2011	18:10	Atlas V	Atlas V 401	SBIRS GEO-1	Success	
50	5 August 2011	16:25	Atlas V	Atlas V 551	Juno	Success	Part of the New Frontiers program, aimed at studying Jupiter and its polar regions. First spacecraft to go to an outer Solar System planet using solar panels.
51	26 November 2011	15:02	Atlas V	Atlas V 541	Mars Science Laboratory	Success	Part of the Large Strategic Science Missions and the Mars Exploration Program, aimed at studying Mars with the Curiosity rover. First mission to Mars to use an RTG.
52	24 February 2012	22:15	Atlas V	Atlas V 551	MUOS-1	Success	
53	4 May 2012	18:42	Atlas V	Atlas V 531	AEHF-2	Success	
54	20 June 2012	12:28	Atlas V	Atlas V 401	NROL-38	Success	NRO launch. Quasar satellite, also known as USA-236.
55	30 August 2012	08:05	Atlas V	Atlas V 401	Van Allen Probes	Success	Part of the Large Strategic Science Missions and the Living With a Star program, aimed at studying Earth's Van Allen belts.
56	11 December 2012	18:03	Atlas V	Atlas V 501	X-37B OTV-3	Success	Third flight of the X-37B. First reuse of the spacecraft.
57	31 January 2013	01:48	Atlas V	Atlas V 401	TDRS-11	Success	Launched as TDRS-K. Part of the Tracking and Data Relay Satellite System. First TDRS launch from SLC-41.
58	19 March 2013	21:21	Atlas V	Atlas V 401	SBIRS GEO 2	Success	
59	15 May 2013	21:38	Atlas V	Atlas V 401	GPS IIF-4	Success	Part of the Global Positioning System. First GPS launch from SLC-41.
60	19 July 2013	13:00	Atlas V	Atlas V 551	MUOS-2	Success	
61	18 September 2013	08:10	Atlas V	Atlas V 531	AEHF-3	Success	
62	18 November 2013	18:28	Atlas V	Atlas V 401	MAVEN	Success	Part of the Mars Exploration Program, going to the titular planet.
63	24 January 2014	02:33	Atlas V	Atlas V 401	TDRS-12	Success	Launched as TDRS-L. Part of the Tracking and Data Relay Satellite System.
64	10 April 2014	17:45	Atlas V	Atlas V 541	NROL-67	Success	NRO launch. SHARP satellite, also known as USA-250.
65	22 May 2014	13:09	Atlas V	Atlas V 401	NROL-33	Success	NRO launch. Quasar satellite, also known as USA-252.
66	2 August 2014	03:23	Atlas V	Atlas V 401	GPS IIF-7	Success	Part of the Global Positioning System.
67	17 September 2014	00:10	Atlas V	Atlas V 401	CLIO	Success	
68	29 October 2014	17:01	Atlas V	Atlas V 401	GPS IIF-8	Success	Part of the Global Positioning System.
69	21 January 2015	01:04	Atlas V	Atlas V 551	MUOS-3	Success	
70	13 March 2015	02:44	Atlas V	Atlas V 421	Magnetospheric Multiscale Mission	Success	Part of the Large Strategic Science Missions and the Solar Terrestrial Probes program, aimed at studying Earth's magnetosphere.
71	20 May 2015	15:05	Atlas V	Atlas V 501	X-37B OTV-4	Success	Fourth flight of the X-37B.
72	15 July 2015	15:36	Atlas V	Atlas V 401	GPS IIF-10	Success	Part of the Global Positioning System.
73	2 September 2015	10:18	Atlas V	Atlas V 551	MUOS-4	Success	
74	2 October 2015	10:28	Atlas V	Atlas V 421	Morelos-3	Success	
75	31 October 2015	16:13	Atlas V	Atlas V 401	GPS IIF-11	Success	Part of the Global Positioning System.
76	6 December 2015	21:44	Atlas V	Atlas V 401	Cygnus CRS OA-4	Success	First of three Cygnus launches on Atlas V, following the failure of Cygnus CRS Orb-3 damaging LP-0A and grounding Antares. First Atlas V launch to the International Space Station.
77	5 February 2016	13:38	Atlas V	Atlas V 401	GPS IIF-12	Success	Part of the Global Positioning System.
78	23 March 2016	03:05	Atlas V	Atlas V 401	Cygnus CRS OA-6	Success	Second of three Cygnus launches on Atlas V to the ISS.
79	24 June 2016	14:30	Atlas V	Atlas V 551	MUOS-5	Success	
80	28 July 2016	12:37	Atlas V	Atlas V 421	NROL-61	Success	NRO launch. Quasar satellite, also known as USA-269.
81	8 September 2016	23:05	Atlas V	Atlas V 411	OSIRIS-REx	Success	Part of the New Frontiers program, aimed at traveling to asteroid 101955 Bennu to collect and return samples to Earth.
82	19 November 2016	23:42	Atlas V	Atlas V 541	GOES-16	Success	Launched as GOES-R. Part of the Geostationary Operational Environmental Satellites system of satellites. First GOES launch on an Atlas V.
83	18 December 2016	19:13	Atlas V	Atlas V 431	EchoStar 19	Success	
84	21 January 2017	00:42	Atlas V	Atlas V 401	SBIRS GEO-3	Success	
85	18 April 2017	15:11	Atlas V	Atlas V 401	Cygnus CRS OA-7	Success	Third and last of three Cygnus launches on Atlas V to the ISS.
86	18 August 2017	12:29	Atlas V	Atlas V 401	TDRS-13	Success	Launched as TDRS-M. Part of the Tracking and Data Relay Satellite System.
87	15 October 2017	07:28	Atlas V	Atlas V 421	NROL-52	Success	NRO launch. Quasar satellite, also known as USA-279.
88	20 January 2018	00:48	Atlas V	Atlas V 411	SBIRS GEO-4	Success	
89	1 March 2018	22:02	Atlas V	Atlas V 541	GOES-17	Success	Launched as GOES-S. Part of the Geostationary Operational Environmental Satellites system of satellites.
90	14 April 2018	23:13	Atlas V	Atlas V 551	AFSPC-11	Success	
91	17 October 2018	04:15	Atlas V	Atlas V 551	AEHF-4	Success	
92	8 August 2019	10:13	Atlas V	Atlas V 551	AEHF-5	Success	
93	20 December 2019	11:36	Atlas V	Atlas V N22	Boeing OFT	Success	First Atlas V launch with the Boeing Starliner and first Boeing demonstration flight for the Commercial Crew Program. Launch was a success, but spacecraft failed to reach the ISS and returned early. First Atlas V launch with no fairing, using the launch tower, and with a two-engine Centaur.
94	10 February 2020	04:03	Atlas V	Atlas V 411	Solar Orbiter	Success	Part of the Cosmic Vision program, aimed at studying the Sun and its polar regions. First launch helmed by the European Space Agency from SLC-41.
95	26 March 2020	20:18	Atlas V	Atlas V 551	AEHF-6	Success	
16	17 May 2020	13:14	Atlas V	Atlas V 501	X-37B OTV-6	Success	Sixth flight of the X-37B. Last flight of the X-37B on an Atlas V.
97	30 July 2020	11:50	Atlas V	Atlas V 541	Mars 2020	Success	Part of the Large Strategic Science Missions and the Mars Exploration Program, aimed at studying Mars with the Perseverance rover and Ingenuity helicopter and to collect surface samples for a future return mission. First spacecraft to fly on another planet, and last Atlas launch to another planet.
98	13 November 2020	22:32	Atlas V	Atlas V 531	NROL-101	Success	NRO launch. Also known as USA-310.
99	18 May 2021	17:37	Atlas V	Atlas V 421	SBIRS GEO 5	Success	
100	16 October 2021	09:34	Atlas V	Atlas V 401	Lucy	Success	Part of the New Frontiers program, aimed at studying a number of Jupiter trojans and other asteroids in the Asteroid belt. Final launch of an Atlas rocket to go beyond geostationary orbit.
101	7 December 2021	10:19	Atlas V	Atlas V 551	STP-3	Success	
102	21 January 2022	19:00	Atlas V	Atlas V 511	GSSAP 5 & 6	Success	
103	1 March 2022	21:38	Atlas V	Atlas V 541	GOES-18	Success	Launched as GOES-T. Part of the Geostationary Operational Environmental Satellites system of satellites.
104	19 May 2022	22:54	Atlas V	Atlas V N22	Boeing OFT-2	Success	Second Boeing demonstration flight for the Commercial Crew Program. First fully successful Starliner mission.
105	1 July 2022	23:15	Atlas V	Atlas V 541	USSF-12	Success	Launch for the United States Space Force. Contained a test spacecraft for a successor to the SBIRS, also known as USA-332, USA-333, and USA-337.
106	4 August 2022	10:29	Atlas V	Atlas V 421	SBIRS GEO-6	Success	Final launch of the Atlas V 400 configuration from SLC-41.
107	4 October 2022	21:36	Atlas V	Atlas V 531	SES-20 & SES-21	Success	
108	10 September 2023	12:47	Atlas V	Atlas V 551	NROL-107	Success	NRO launch. Three Silentbarker satellites, also known as USA-346 to USA-348. Final NRO launch on an Atlas rocket.
109	6 October 2023	18:06	Atlas V	Atlas V 501	KuiperSat Protoflight	Success	First launch of the Kuiper Systems megaconstellation for Amazon, carrying two demonstration satellites. Final Atlas launch without solid rocket boosters.

==== Vulcan Centaur and post-Vulcan Atlas V ====
All launches operated by United Launch Alliance.

No.	Date	Time (UTC)	Launch vehicle	Configuration	Payload/mission	Result	Remarks
110	8 January 2024	07:18	Vulcan Centaur	Vulcan VC2S	Peregrine Mission One	Success	Maiden flight of Vulcan Centaur. First launch of Astrobotic's Peregrine lunar lander and first launch of the Commercial Lunar Payload Services program. Launch was a success, but a propellant leak precluded any landing attempts.
111	5 June 2024	14:52	Atlas V	Atlas V N22	Boeing CFT	Success	First crewed launch of Starliner, first crewed launch of Atlas V, and crewed launch from SLC-41. First crewed launch from Cape Canaveral since Apollo 7 in 1968. Carried astronauts Barry Wilmore and Sunita Williams to the International Space Station. Launch and docking was a success, but spacecraft issues caused it to return uncrewed, with Wilmore and Williams being reassigned to Expedition 72's crew.
112	30 July 2024	10:45	Atlas V	Atlas V 551	USSF-51	Success	Launch for the United States Space Force. Three unknown satellites, also known as USA-396 to USA-398. Final military launch of an Atlas rocket.
113	4 October 2024	11:25	Vulcan Centaur	Vulcan VC2S	Certification Flight 2	Success	Carried a mass simulator payload, initially planning to be Dream Chaser's maiden flight before delays forced a payload switch. 37 seconds into launch, an anomaly occurred leading to the failure of one solid rocket booster's nozzle; however, Vulcan continued into orbit and flight was declared a success.
114	28 April 2025	23:01	Atlas V	Atlas V 551	KuiperSat KA-01	Success	First operational launch of the Kuiper Systems megaconstellation for Amazon.
115	23 June 2025	10:54	Atlas V	Atlas V 551	KuiperSat KA-02	Success	
116	13 August 2025	00:56	Vulcan Centaur	Vulcan VC4S	USSF-106	Success	Launch for the United States Space Force. Includes NTS satellite, also known as USA-554 and USA-571. First military launch for Vulcan.
117	25 September 2025	12:09	Atlas V	Atlas V 551	KuiperSat KA-03	Success	
118	14 November 2025	03:04	Atlas V	Atlas V 551	ViaSat-3 F2	Success	Final Atlas launch traveling beyond low Earth orbit.
119	16 December 2025	08:28	Atlas V	Atlas V 551	LeoSat LA-04	Success	First Amazon Leo launch following its renaming from Kuiper Systems.
120	12 February 2026	09:22	Vulcan Centaur	Vulcan VC4S	USSF-87	Success	Launch for the United States Space Force. Two GSSAP satellites, also known as USA-583 and USA-584.
121	4 April 2026	05:46	Atlas V	Atlas V 551	LeoSat LA-05	Success	
122	28 April 2026	00:53	Atlas V	Atlas V 551	LeoSat LA-06	Success	500th launch from the Integrate-Transfer-Launch Complex.
123	29 May 2026	23:53	Atlas V	Atlas V 551	LeoSat LA-07	Success	
124	2 July 2026	04:30	Atlas V	Atlas V 551	LeoSat LA-08	Success	Last Amazon Leo flight on Atlas V. Final launch of the Atlas V 500 configuration, and final non-Starliner launch of an Atlas V.
125	15 November 2026	17:40	Vulcan Centaur	Vulcan VC6L	LeoSat LV-01	Failure	First Amazon Leo flight on Vulcan, and first Vulcan flight assembled in the VIF-A. Sub-optimal propellant supply to core stage BE-4s led to failure to reach orbit.

==== Upcoming launches ====
Date	Launch vehicle	Payload/Mission
14 January 2027	Atlas V	Boeing Starliner-1

== Gallery ==
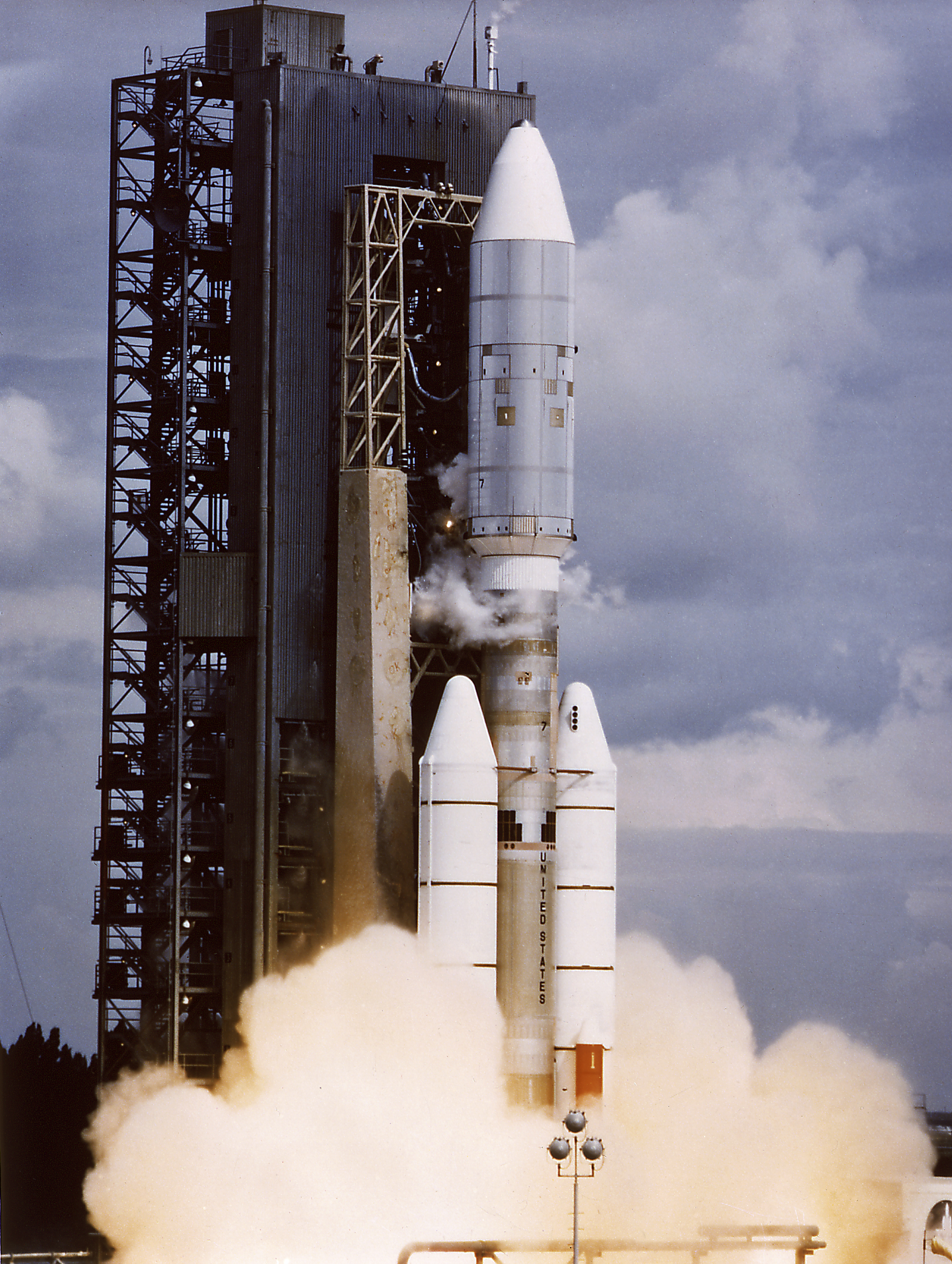
A Titan IIIE launching Voyager 2 from LC-41 in 1977.

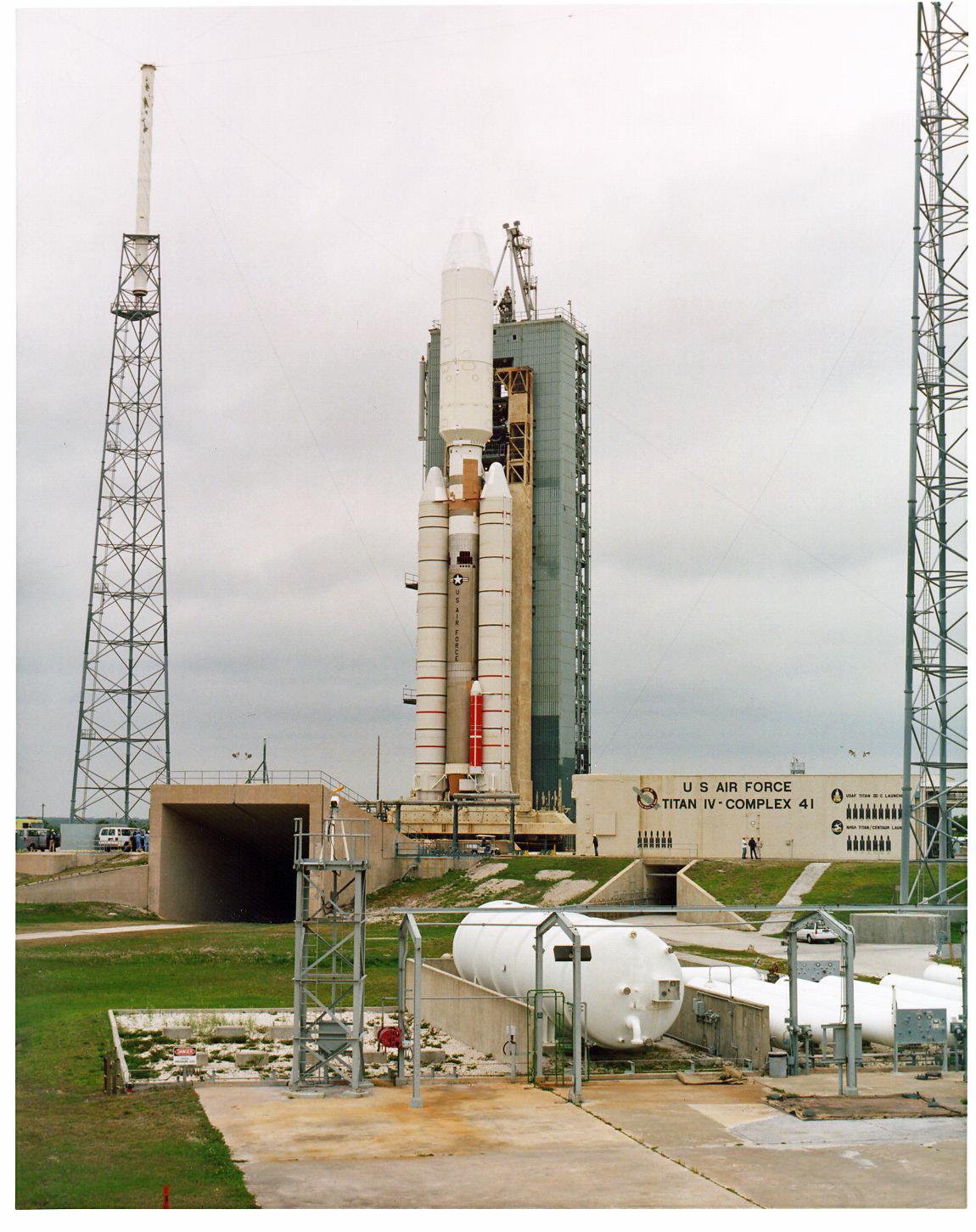
A Titan IV on LC-41 in 1996. The steel towers visible at the left and right are part of the lightning protection system.

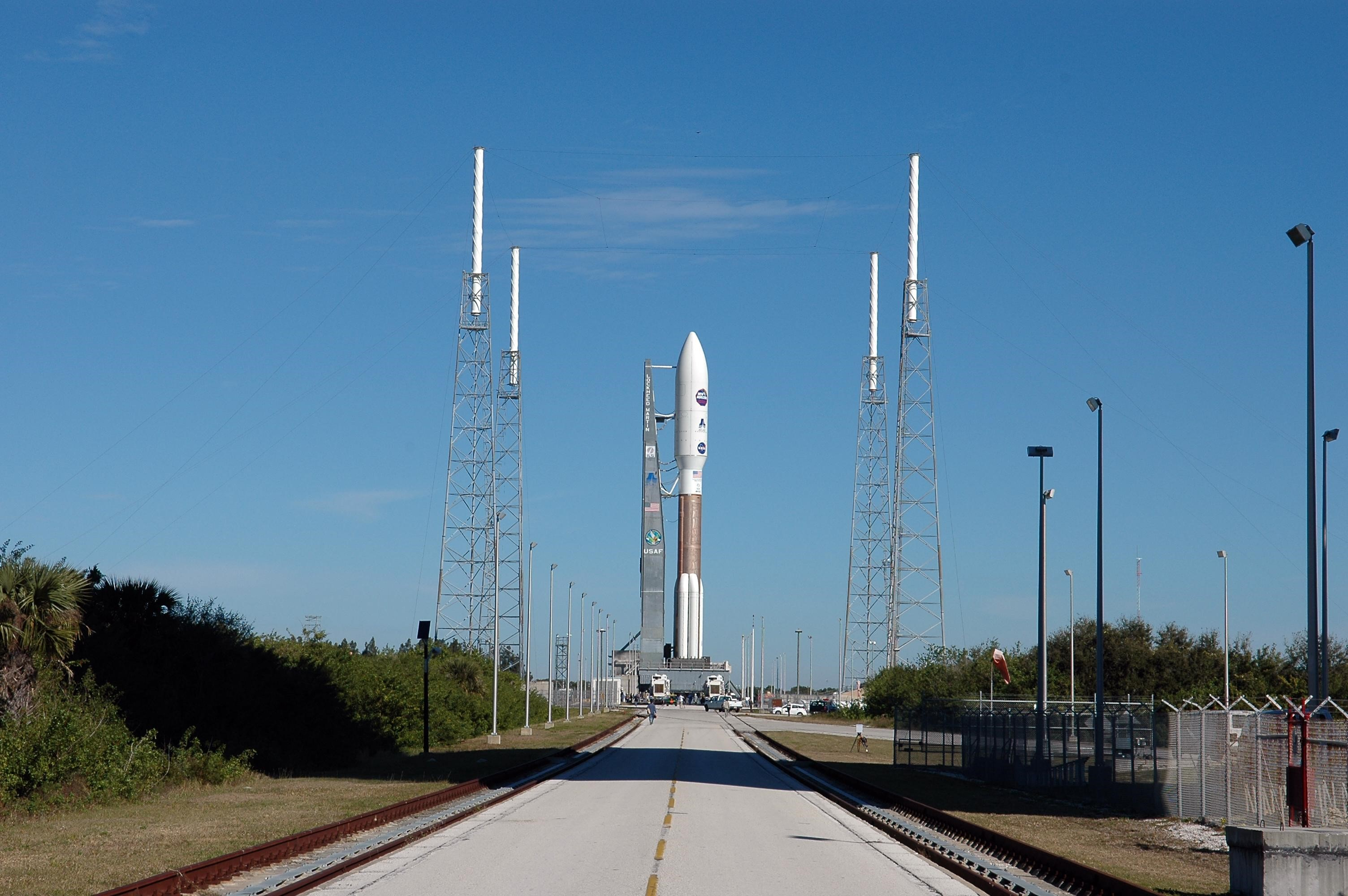
SLC-41 in its early Atlas V years, carrying New Horizons as its payload in 2006.

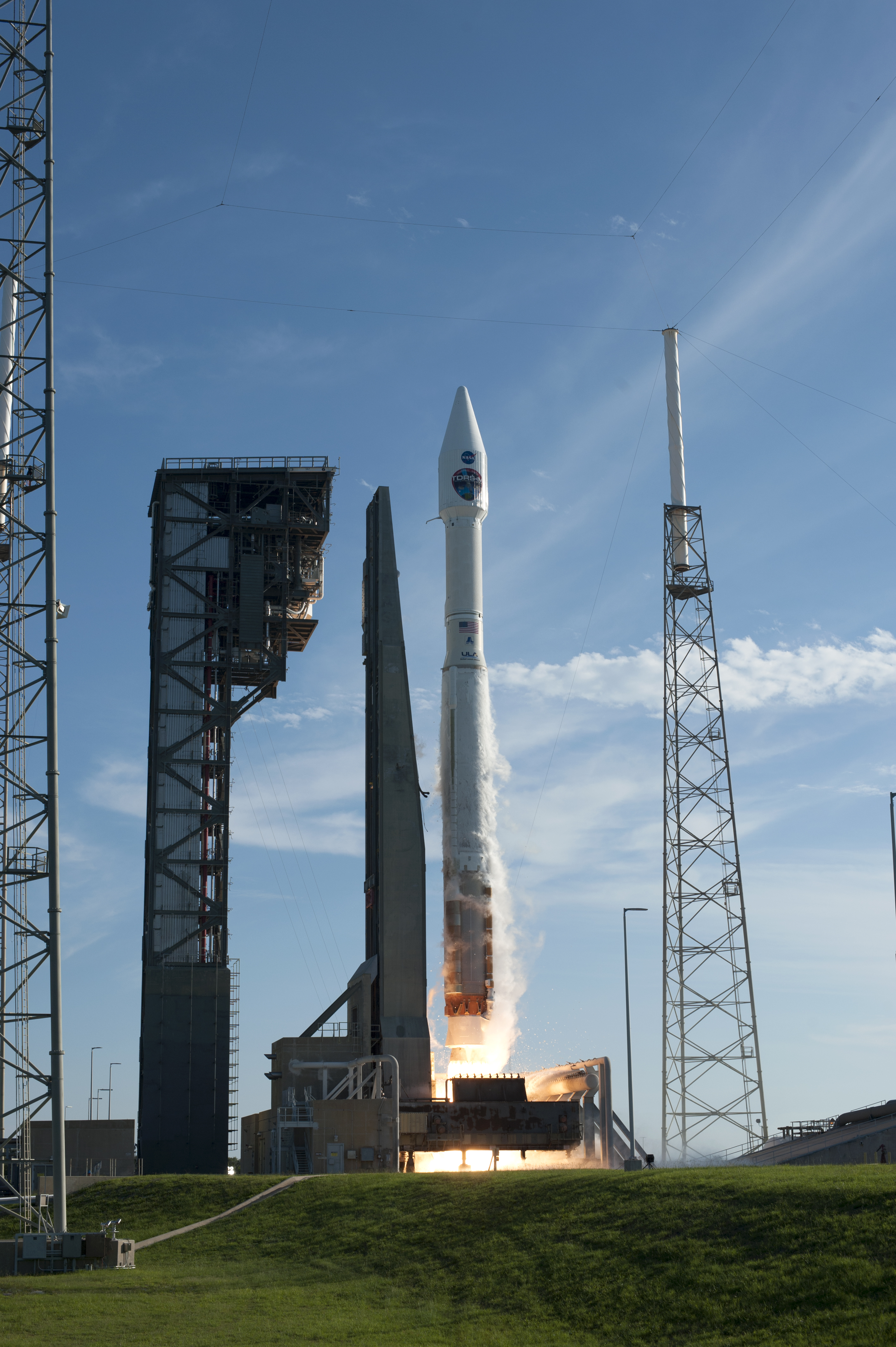
An Atlas V launching from the pad, with the crew access tower (left) complete.

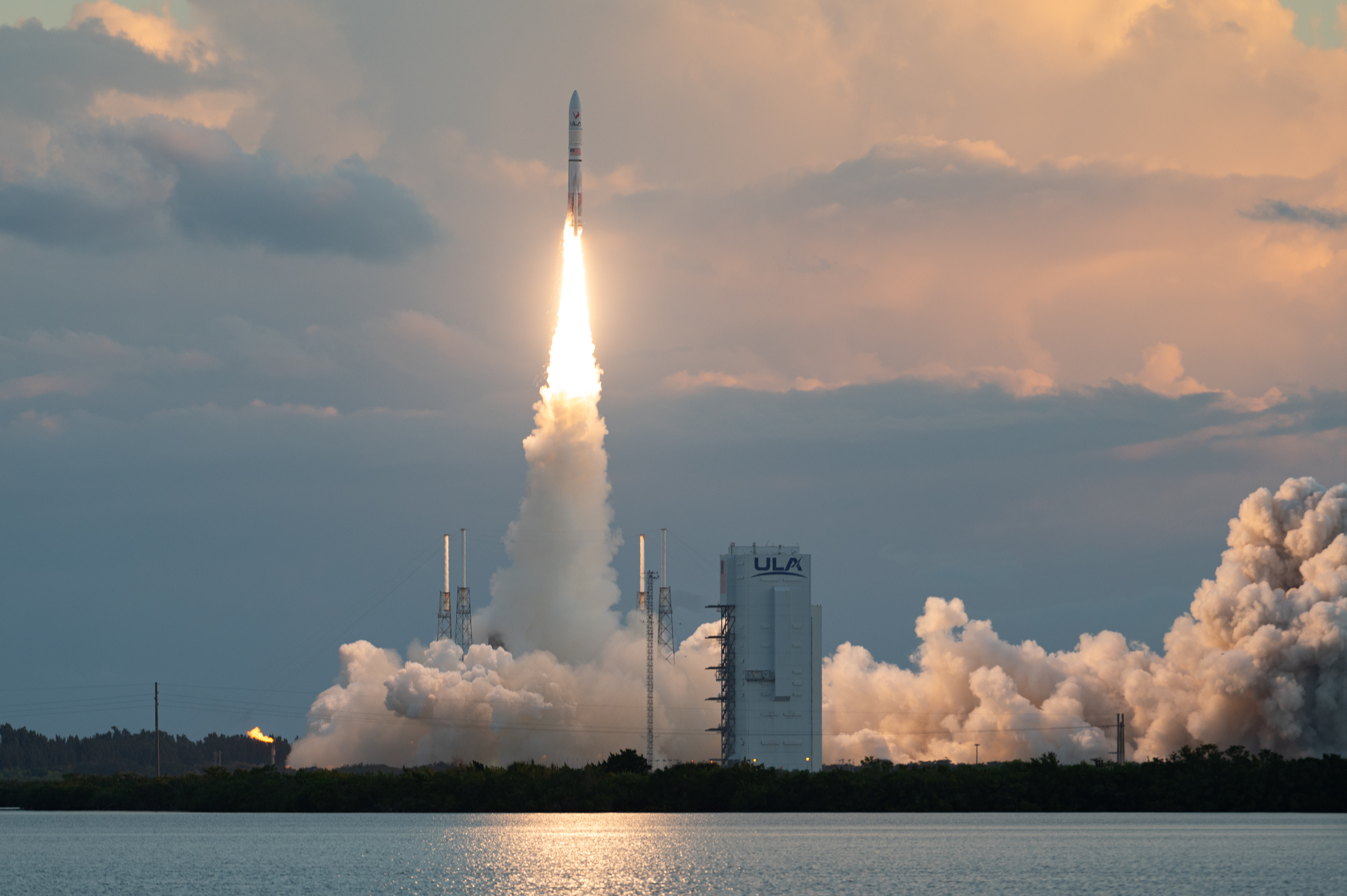
A Vulcan Centaur Launches from SLC-41 in October 2024.

== See also ==
- List of Cape Canaveral and Merritt Island launch sites
- Cape Canaveral Space Launch Complex 40
