= Titan IIIE =

Expendable launch system used by NASA

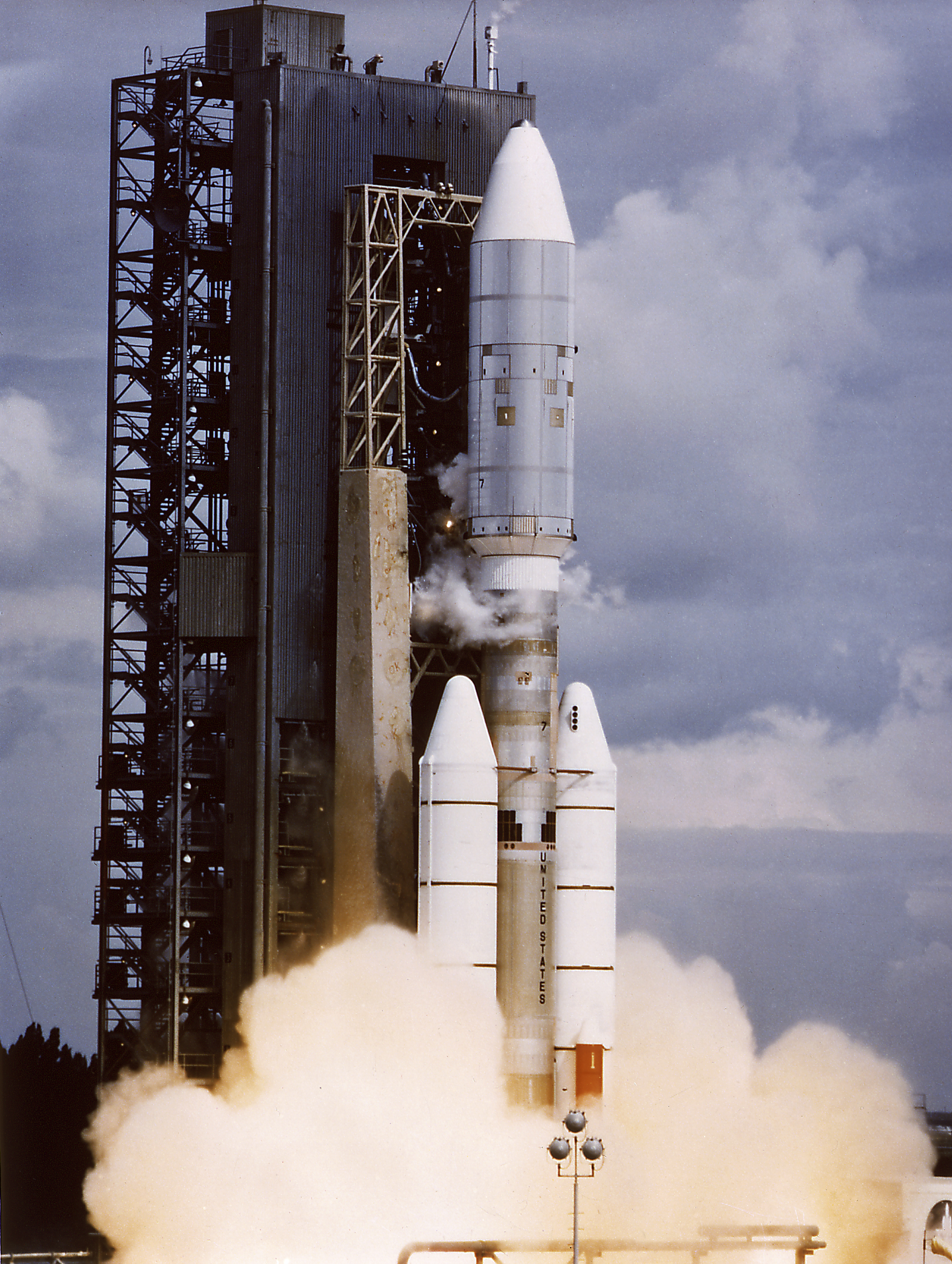
- Launch of a Titan IIIE with Voyager 2
- Function: Expendable launch system
- Manufacturer: Martin Marietta; Convair Aerospace Division of General Dynamics (prime contractor for the third stage Centaur D-1T)
- Country of origin: United States

Size
- Height: 48.8 m (160 ft)
- Diameter: 3.05 m (10.0 ft)
- Mass: 632,970 kg (1,395,460 lb)
- Stages: 3 with an option for 4

Capacity

Payload to Low Earth orbit
- Mass: 15,400 kg (34,000 lb)

Payload to Heliocentric orbit (TMI)
- Mass: 3,700 kg (8,200 lb)

Associated rockets
- Family: Titan

Launch history
- Status: Retired
- Launch sites: Launch Complex 41; Cape Canaveral Air Force Station; Cape Canaveral, Florida
- Total launches: 7
- Success(es): 6
- Failure: 1
- First flight: February 11, 1974
- Last flight: September 5, 1977
- Carries passengers or cargo: Voyager (1 / 2); Viking (1 / 2); Helios (A / B)

Zero stage – Solid Rocket Boosters
- Powered by: UA1205; Chemical Systems Division of United Technologies (two, five-segment, strap-on boosters)
- Maximum thrust: 5,339 kN (1,200,000 lb_{f}) (each booster)
- Specific impulse: 266 s (2.61 km/s)
- Burn time: 117 seconds

First stage – Core First Stage
- Powered by: LR87-11 (one); Aerojet
- Maximum thrust: 2,313 kN (520,000 lb_{f}) or 2,091 kN (470,000 lb_{f})
- Specific impulse: 301.1 s (2.953 km/s)
- Burn time: 146 seconds
- Propellant: N_{2}O_{4} / Aerozine 50

Second stage – Core Second Stage
- Powered by: LR91-11 (one)); Aerojet
- Maximum thrust: 449 kN (101,000 lb_{f}) or 444.8 kN (100,000 lb_{f})
- Specific impulse: 318.7 s (3.125 km/s)
- Burn time: 210 seconds
- Propellant: N_{2}O_{4} / Aerozine 50

Third stage – Centaur D-1T
- Powered by: RL10A-3 (two); Pratt & Whitney Aircraft Division of the United Aircraft Corporation
- Maximum thrust: 66.7 kN (15,000 lb_{f}) (each engine)
- Specific impulse: 444 s (4.35 km/s)
- Burn time: 470 seconds
- Propellant: LH_{2} / LOX

Fourth stage – Star 37E
- Powered by: 1 solid Thiokol
- Maximum thrust: 68 kN (15,000 lb_{f})
- Specific impulse: 283.6 s (2.781 km/s)
- Burn time: 42 seconds
- Propellant: Solid

The Titan IIIE or Titan 3E, also known as the Titan III-Centaur, was an American expendable launch system. Launched seven times between 1974 and 1977, it enabled several high-profile NASA missions, including the Voyager and Viking planetary probes and the joint West Germany-U.S. Helios spacecraft. All seven launches were conducted from Cape Canaveral Air Force Station Launch Complex 41 in Cape Canaveral, Florida.

== Development ==
In the early 1960s, NASA's long-range plan was to continue using Atlas-Centaur until a reusable launch system or a nuclear-powered upper stage could be developed. To help fund the escalating Vietnam War and the new War on Poverty, Congress drastically reduced the funding of the civilian space program. In addition, further development of the reusable launch vehicle was postponed. NASA needed a launch vehicle more powerful than Atlas-Centaur to send heavier planetary probes like Viking and Voyager into space in the 1970s. So, NASA began in 1967 to consider the possibility of mating a Centaur upper stage with the Titan III. On June 26, NASA contracted with Martin Marietta to study its feasibility. By March 1969, this combination looked promising. NASA assigned management of the vehicle to the NASA Lewis Research Center (now known as the NASA John H. Glenn Research Center at Lewis Field) with follow-on contracts with Martin Marietta to develop what became the Titan IIIE and General Dynamics to adapt the Centaur D-1.

Several modifications to the Centaur were necessary to accommodate the more powerful booster. The most obvious change was enclosing Centaur in a large shroud to protect the stage and payload during ascent. The shroud made it possible to improve Centaur's insulation and thereby increase its coast time in orbit from thirty minutes when launched on an Atlas-Centaur to over five hours on the Titan IIIE. Because Centaur was wider than the Titan's core stage, a tapering interface was required. This interface needed insulation to prevent Titan's ambient-temperature hypergolic propellants from causing the boil-off of Centaur's cryogenic fuels. The Centaur stage also contained the guidance system for the entire launch vehicle.

A four-stage configuration was available, with a Star-37E being the additional upper stage. This was used for the two Helios launches. Star-37E stages were also used on the two Voyager launches, but the stages were considered part of the payload instead of part of the rocket.

== Flights ==
The first launch of the Titan IIIE on February 11, 1974, was a failure. As a "Proof Flight", it was planned to have the same trajectory as the Viking mission to Mars that was scheduled for launch in 1975. The original plan was for this flight to carry the Viking Dynamic Simulator (VDS), a model of the Viking spacecraft. Engineers at the Lewis Research Center, however, ultimately persuaded their colleagues to put the Sphinx satellite on the flight in addition to the VDS. The mission of the satellite was to measure the interaction of space plasmas with the satellite's high-voltage surfaces. The Titan phase of the flight was largely uneventful and second stage cutoff and Centaur separation were effected at T+469 seconds. However, the Centaur failed to start. A backup command from the missile programmer at T+525 seconds failed to initiate main engine start. With the Centaur in free-fall, the Range Safety station in Antigua sent the destruct command at T+748 seconds.

Examination of telemetry data revealed that the Centaur's LOX boost pump did not activate, preventing proper mainstage engine operation from being achieved. The guidance system issued a shutdown command after the first engine start attempt due to insufficient acceleration. After the second attempt, it entered coasting mode as it would have had orbital injection been achieved. Initial suspicions that the Centaur had been damaged by colliding with the second stage were disproven by accelerometer data and instead it was suspected that loose debris or ice had caused the boost pump to seize up. To reduce the chance of a second failure, prelaunch procedures were implemented to verify that Centaur's pumps were free and unobstructed. Nearly four years passed before the cause of the failure was determined: an improperly installed mounting bracket inside the liquid oxygen (LOX) tank. This bracket held a LOX regulator in place. The technician responsible for installing it had found that the normal tool used to screw bolts into place was too short to reach the bracket. He thus used a slightly longer socket wrench that gave him more reach. Before the technician retired, he failed to inform his successor about this. When the new technician attempted to attach the bolt with the wrench specified in the assembly instructions, the wrench was too short and prevented him from screwing it into place properly. The bolt came loose, fell off, and got sucked into one of the LOX boost pumps, which jammed the pump and prevented its operation. Despite the failure, at least one important goal was achieved. The Centaur's bulging shroud was proven to be aerodynamically stable during flight and had jettisoned properly and on schedule. One other minor problem was evident: At T+179 seconds, Titan thrust assembly #2 experienced a 2% thrust decay. This was accompanied by a small drop in turbopump speed and gas generator performance. Consequently, the Titan core stage cut off two seconds later than nominal. The anomaly was traced to a cover on an unused instrumentation port on the turbine inlet coming loose during launch, allowing hot gas from the gas generator to leak out of it.

The next flight of the Titan IIIE was on December 10, 1974, carrying the Helios-A spacecraft. This mission was successful, as were all subsequent launches.

Voyager 1's launch almost failed because Titan's second stage shut down too early, leaving 1,200 pounds (540 kg) of propellant unburned. To compensate, the Centaur's on-board computers ordered a burn that was far longer than planned. At cutoff, the Centaur was only 3.4 seconds from propellant exhaustion. If the same failure had occurred during Voyager 2's launch a few weeks earlier, the Centaur would have run out of propellant before the probe reached the correct trajectory. Jupiter was in a more favorable position vis-à-vis Earth during the launch of Voyager 1 than during the launch of Voyager 2.

== Launch history ==
Date/Time (GMT)	S/N		Payload	Outcome	Remarks
Date/Time (GMT)	Titan	Centaur	Payload	Outcome	Remarks
February 11, 1974; 13:48:02	23E-1	TC-1	Sphinx	Failure	Centaur liquid oxygen turbopump malfunction. RSO destruct at T+742 seconds.
December 10, 1974; 07:11:02	23E-2	TC-2	Helios-A	Success	First space probe to orbit closer to the Sun than Mercury.
August 20, 1975; 21:22:00	23E-4	TC-4	Viking 1	Success	Carried the Viking 1 orbiter and lander to Mars.
September 9, 1975; 18:39:00	23E-3	TC-3	Viking 2	Success	Carried the Viking 2 orbiter and lander to Mars.
January 15, 1976; 05:34:00	23E-5	TC-5	Helios-B	Success	Once held the record for a space probe's fastest velocity relative to the Sun. Now held by Parker Solar Probe.
August 20, 1977; 14:29:44	23E-7	TC-7	Voyager 2	Success	Additionally boosted by a Star 37E upper stage. Flew by Jupiter, Saturn, Uranus, and Neptune, thereby completing the Mariner Jupiter-Saturn Program. It left the Solar System in November 2018.
September 5, 1977; 12:56:01	23E-6	TC-6	Voyager 1	Success	Titan malfunction caused premature second-stage engine cutoff, but successfully compensated by extended Centaur burn. Additionally boosted by a Star 37E upper stage. Flew by Jupiter and Saturn. Exited the Solar System's heliosphere in 2012. The most distant human-made object from Earth.

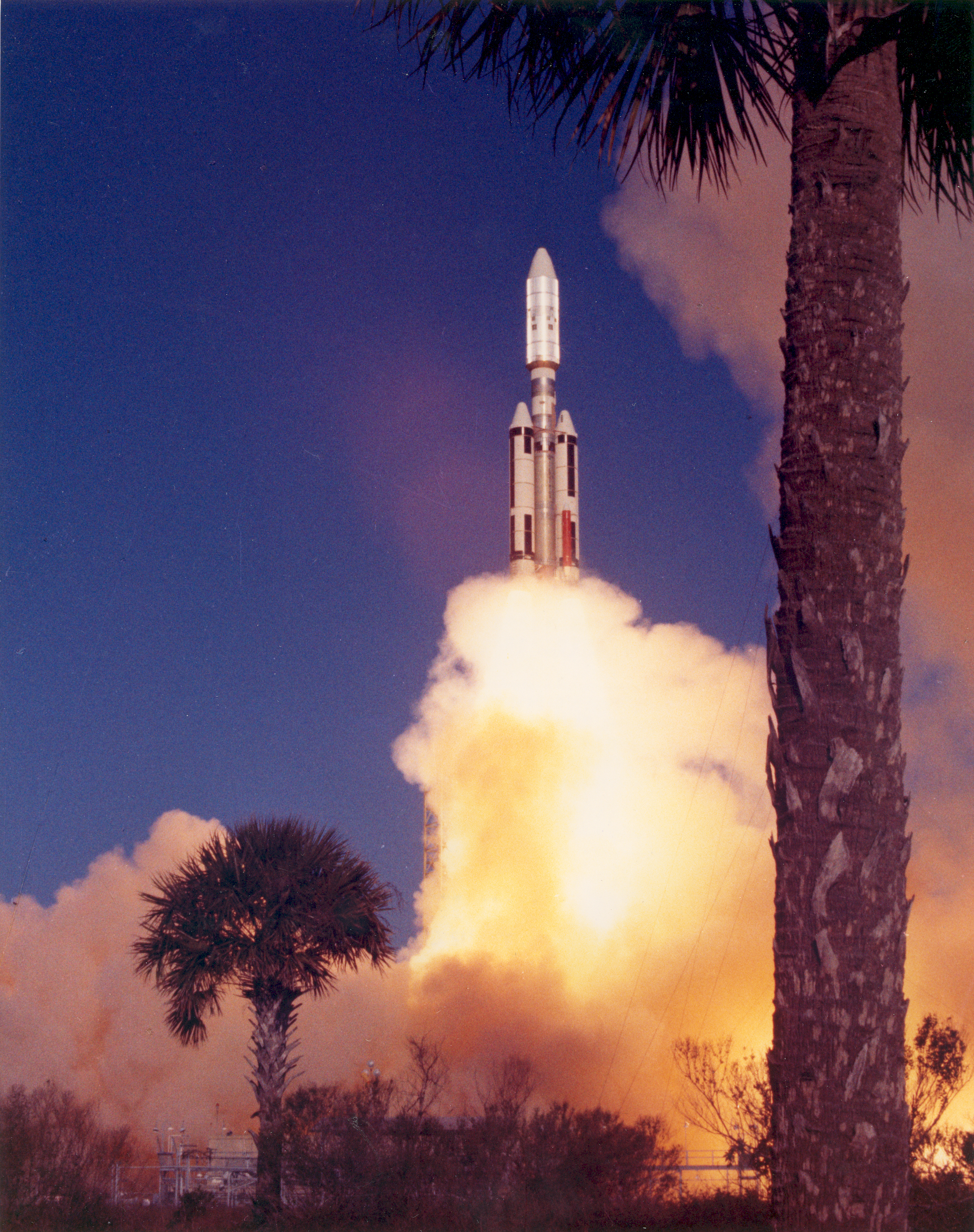
Titan 23E-1 with Sphinx

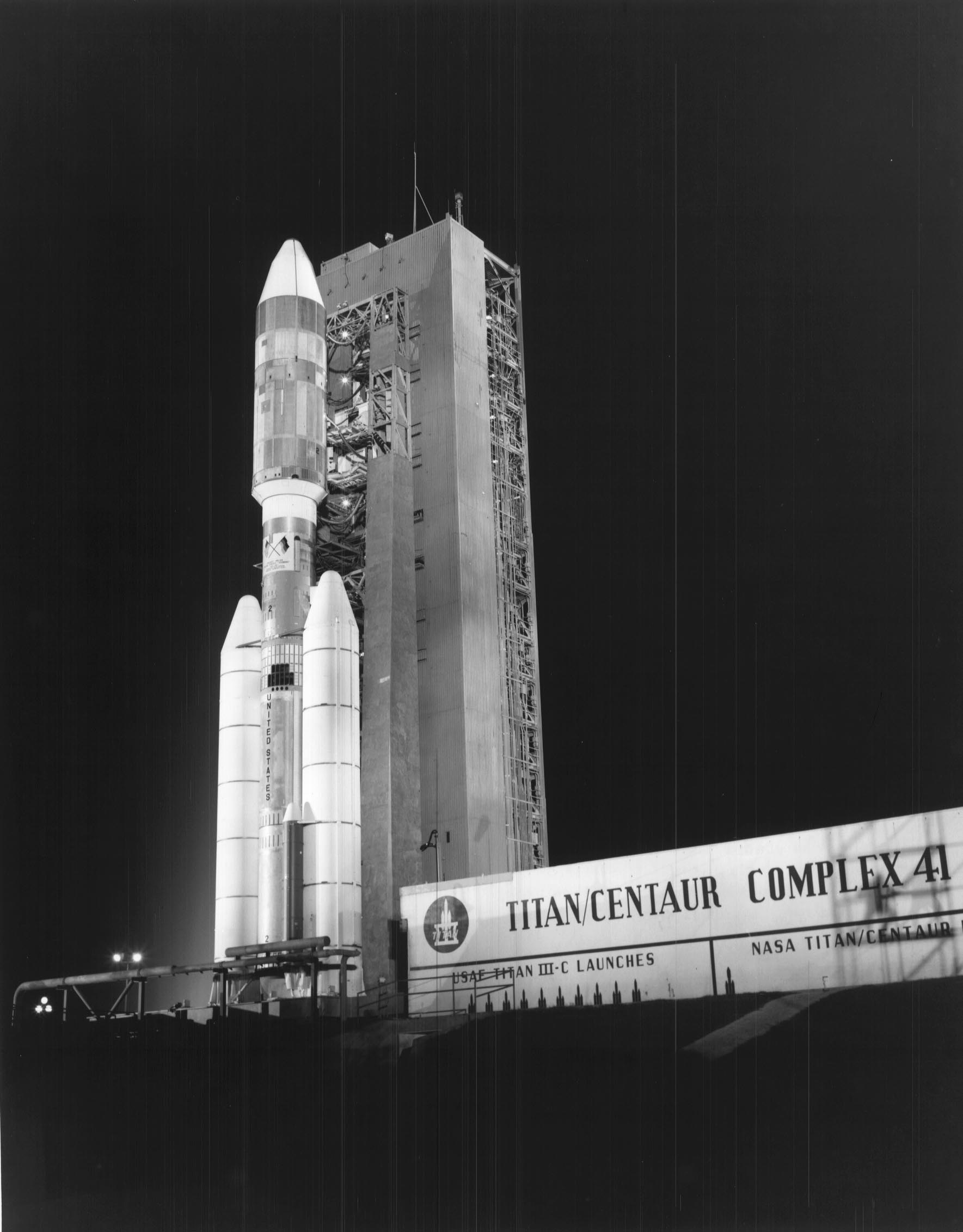
Titan 23E-2 with Helios-A

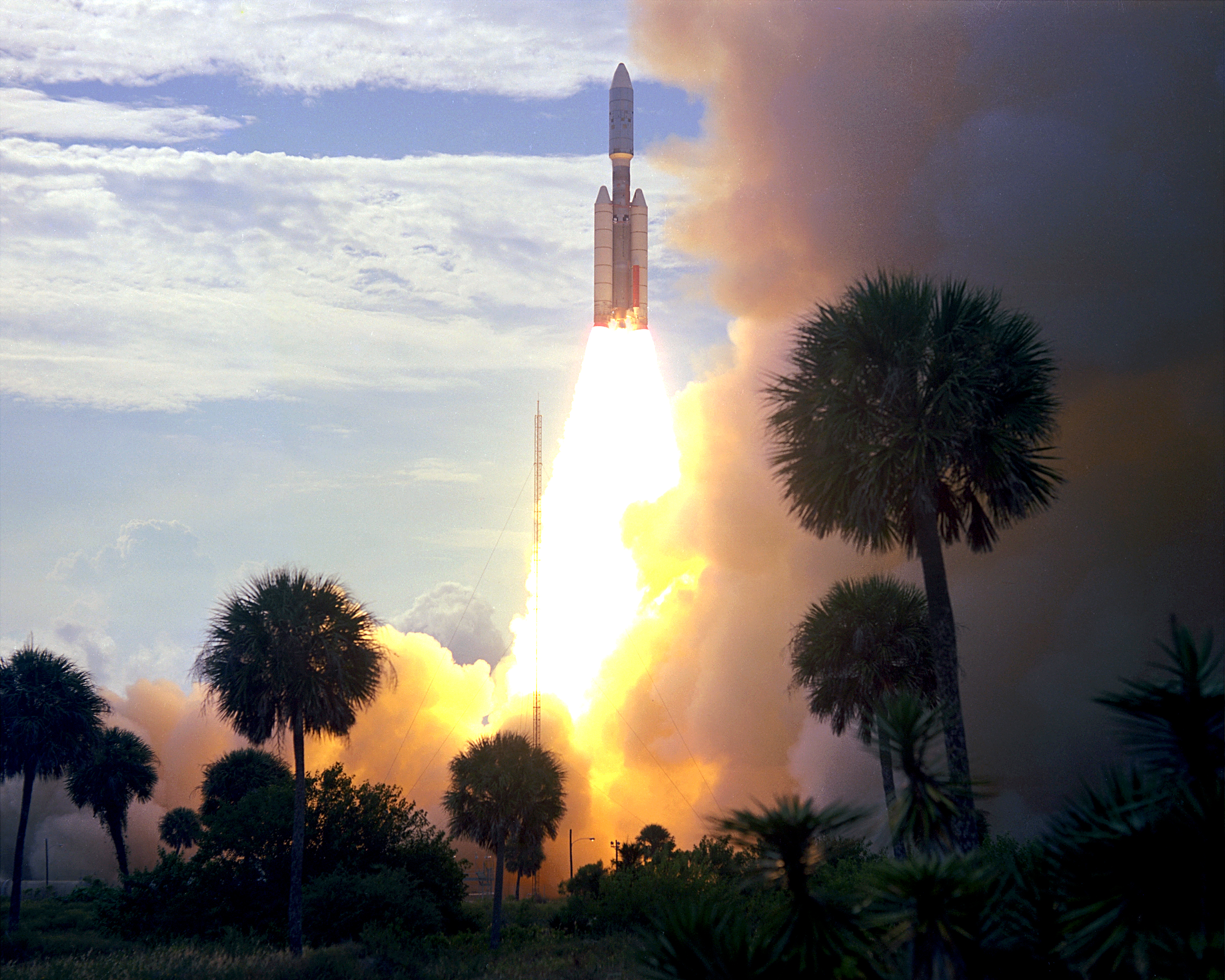
Titan 23E-4 with Viking 1

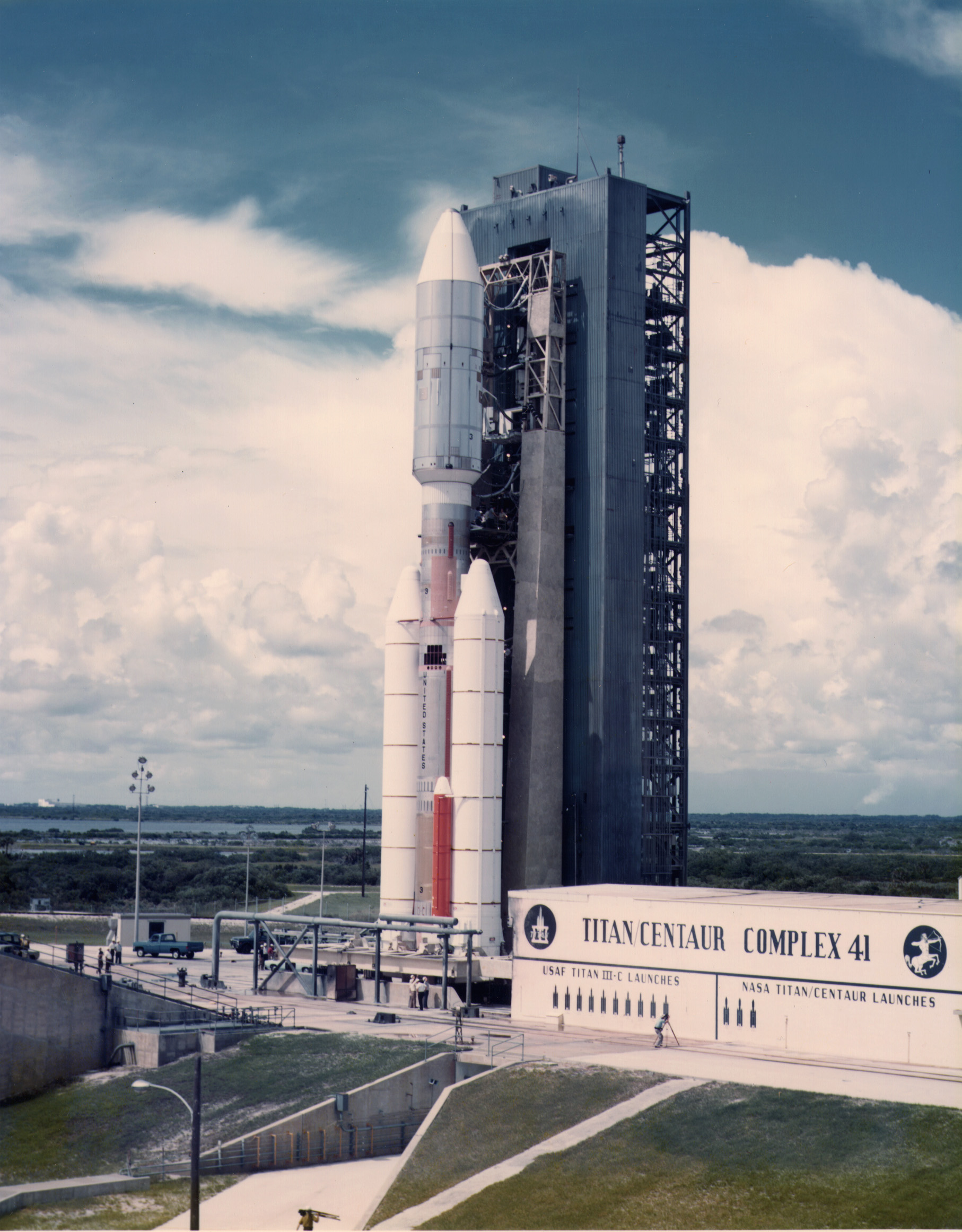
Titan 23E-3 with Viking 2

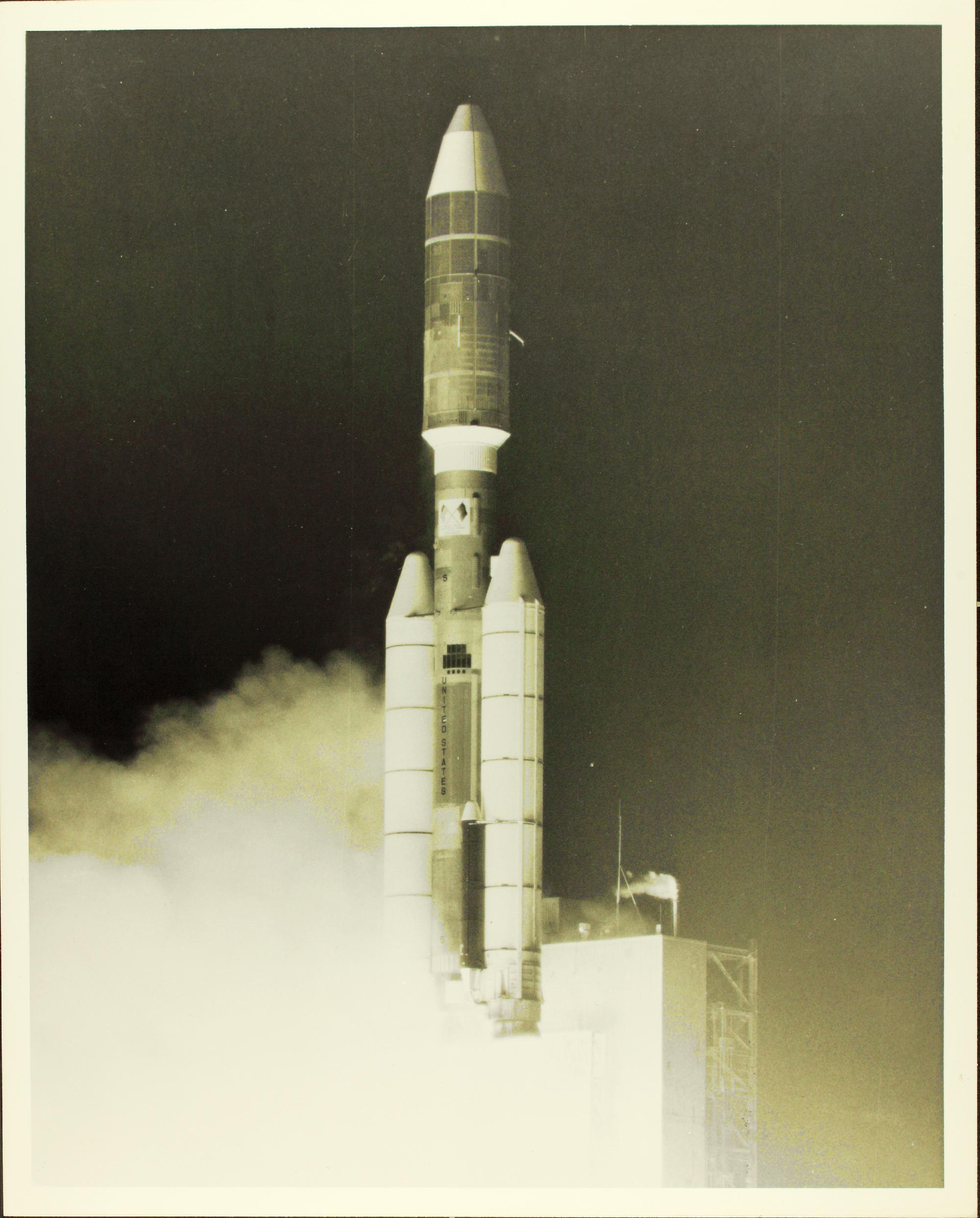
Titan 23E-5 with Helios-B

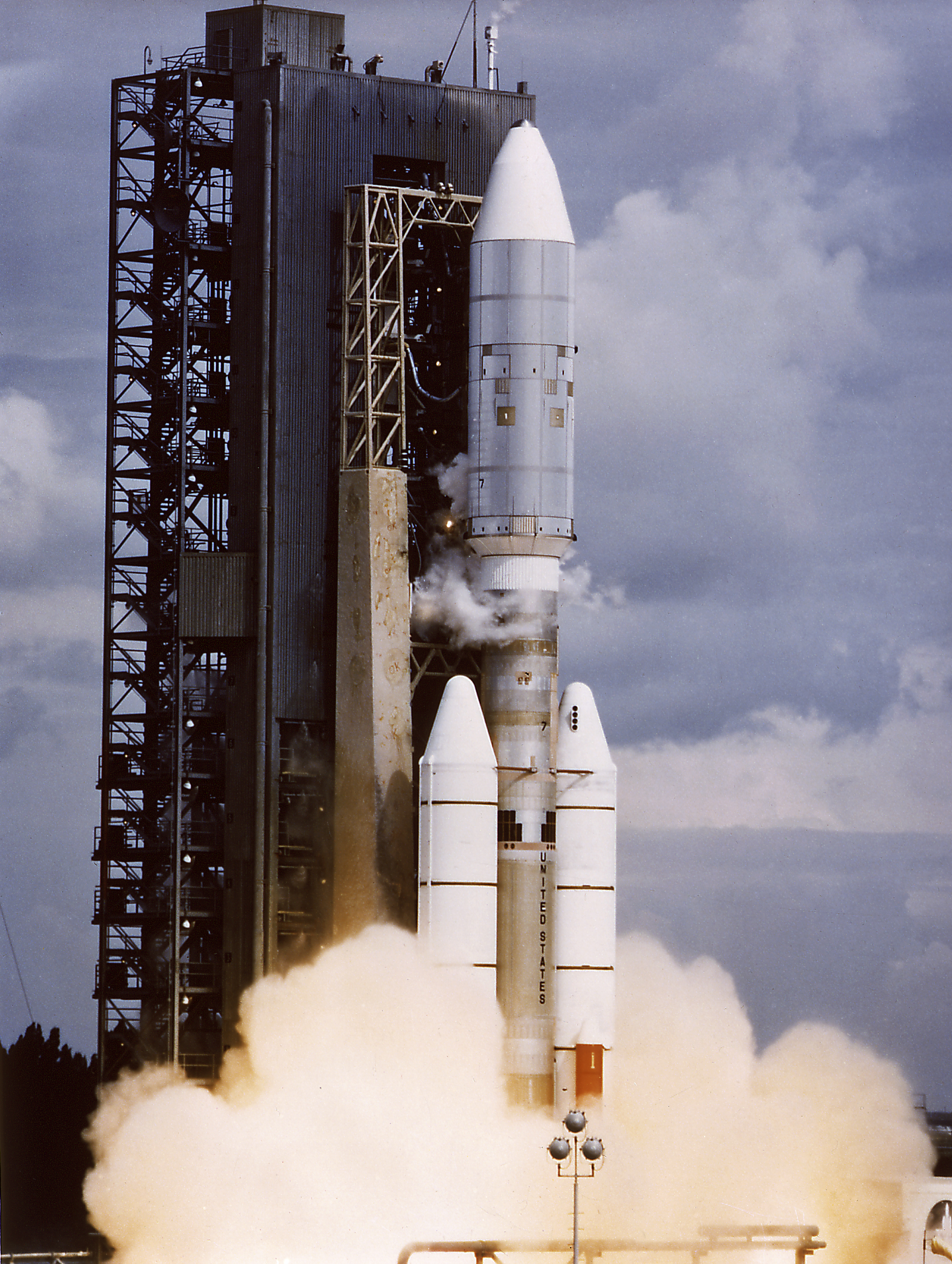
Titan 23E-7 with Voyager 2

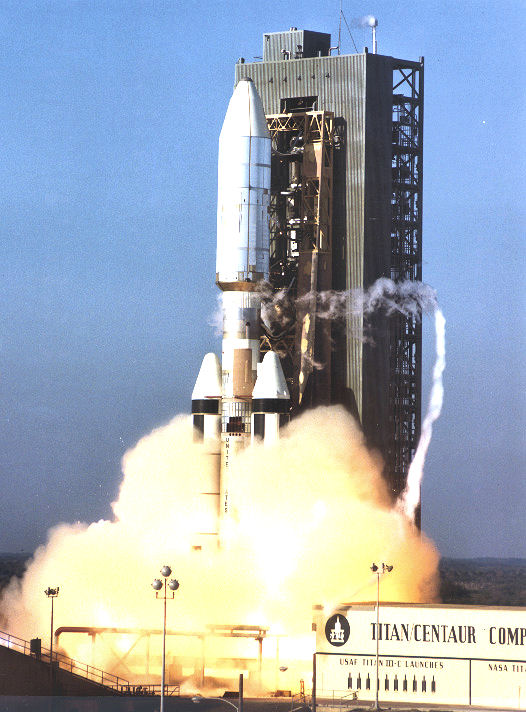
Titan 23E-6 with Voyager 1

== Design ==
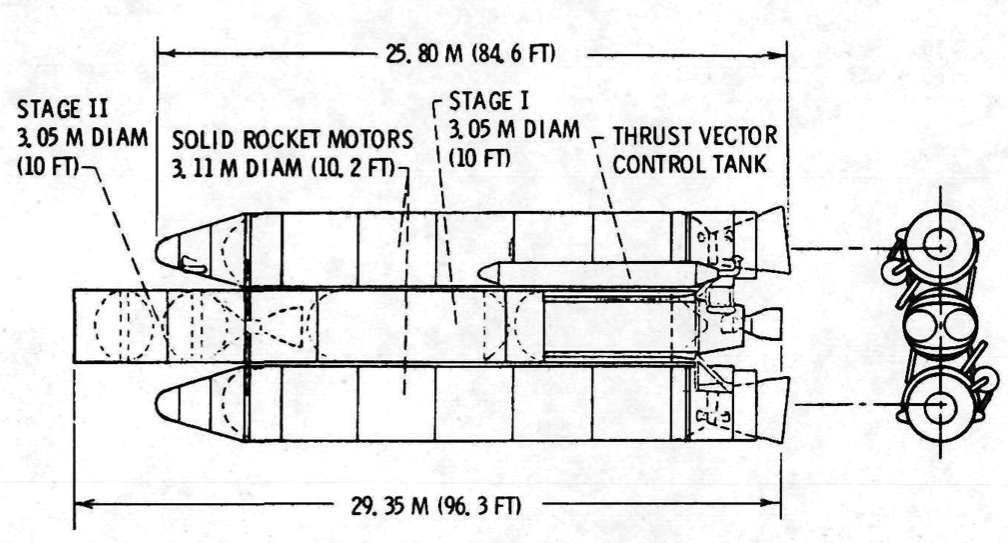
Schematics of Titan IIIE with two solid rocket motors (Stage 0) and the Titan III core vehicle Stages I and II
