= Advanced Extremely High Frequency =

Series of American military communications satellites

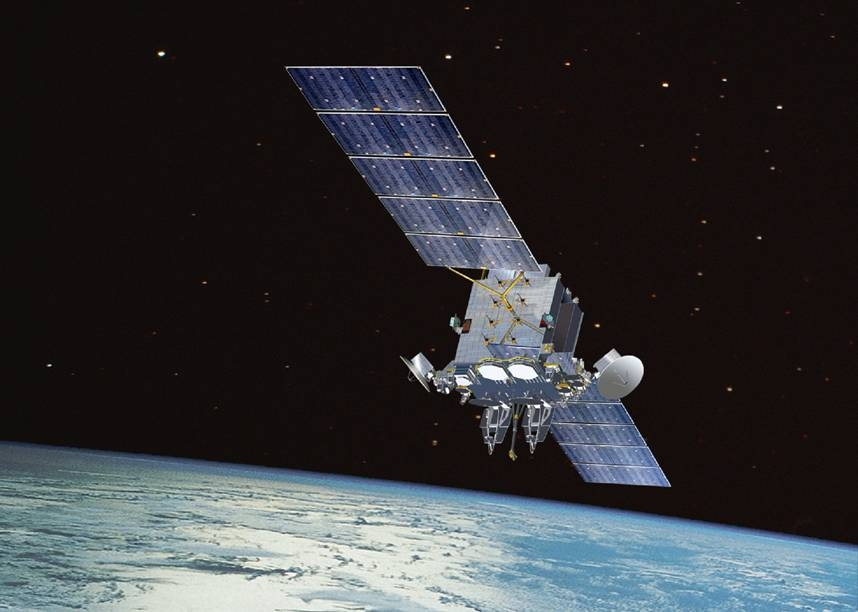
- Artist's impression of an AEHF satellite
- Manufacturer: Lockheed Martin; Northrop Grumman
- Country of origin: United States
- Operator: United States Space Force
- Applications: Military communications

Specifications
- Bus: A2100M
- Launch mass: 6,168 kg (13,598 lb)
- Regime: Geosynchronous orbit
- Design life: 14 years (planned)

Production
- Status: Operational; Active
- On order: 0
- Built: 6
- Launched: 6
- Operational: 5
- Maiden launch: 14 August 2010 (USA-214)
- Last launch: 26 March 2020 (USA-298)

Advanced Extremely High Frequency (AEHF) is a constellation of communications satellites operated by the United States Space Force. They are used to relay secure communications for the United States Armed Forces, the British Armed Forces, the Canadian Armed Forces, the Netherlands Armed Forces and the Australian Defence Force. The system consists of six satellites in geostationary orbits. The final satellite was launched on 26 March 2020. AEHF is backward compatible with, and replaces, the older Milstar system and will operate at 44 GHz uplink (extremely high frequency (EHF) band) and 20 GHz downlink (super high frequency (SHF) band). The AEHF system is a joint service communications system that provides survivable, global, secure, protected, and jam-resistant communications for high-priority military ground, sea and air assets.

== Overview ==
AEHF satellites use many narrow spot beams directed towards the Earth to relay communications to and from users. Crosslinks between the satellites allow them to relay communications directly rather than via a ground station. The satellites are designed to provide jam-resistant communications with a low probability of interception. They incorporate frequency-hopping radio technology, as well as phased array antennas that can adapt their radiation patterns in order to block out potential sources of jamming.

AEHF incorporates the existing Milstar low data-rate and medium data-rate signals, providing 75–2400 bit/s and 4.8 kbit/s–1.544 Mbit/s respectively. It also incorporates a new signal, allowing data rates of up to 8.192 Mbit/s. When complete, the space segment of the AEHF system will consist of six satellites, which provides coverage of the surface of the Earth between latitudes of 65° north and 65° south. For northern polar regions, the Enhanced Polar System acts as an adjunct to AEHF to provide EHF coverage.

The initial contract for the design and development of the AEHF satellites was awarded to Lockheed Martin Space Systems and Northrop Grumman Space Technology in November 2001, and covered the System Development and Demonstration phase of the program. The contract covered the construction and launch of three satellites, and the construction of a mission control segment. The contract was managed by the MILSATCOM Program Office of the Space and Missile Systems Center. Like the Milstar system, AEHF are operated by the 4th Space Operations Squadron, located at Schriever Space Force Base and the 148th Space Operations Squadron at Vandenberg SFB.

It extends the "cross-links" among AEHF of earlier Milstar satellites, which makes it much less vulnerable to attacks on ground stations. As a geosynchronous satellite over the equator, it still needs to be supplemented with additional systems optimized for polar coverage in high latitudes.

In the April 2009 Defense Department budget request, Secretary of Defense Robert Gates said he planned to cancel the Transformational Satellite Communications System, still in the design phase, in favor of additional AEHF capacity. Individual AEHF satellites, exclusive of launch expenses, cost US$850 million.

== Bands ==
Prior to the AEHF, United States and allied military satellite communications systems fell into one of three categories:

- Wideband: maximum bandwidth among fixed and semifixed earth stations
- Protected: survivable against electronic warfare and other attacks, even if bandwidth is sacrificed
- Narrowband: principally for tactical use, sacrificing bandwidth for simplicity, reliability, and light weight of terrestrial equipment

AEHF, however, converges the role of its wideband Defense Satellite Communications System (DSCS) and protected MILSTAR predecessors, while increasing bandwidth over both. There will still need to be specialized satellite communications for extremely high data rate space sensors, such as geospatial and signals intelligence satellites, but their downlinked data will typically go to a specialized receiver and be processed into smaller amounts; the processed data will flow through AEHF.

== Launch and positioning ==
AEHF satellites are sent into space using an Atlas V rocket under the Evolved Expendable Launch Vehicle (EELV) Program. The payload weight at launch is approximately 9,000 kg (20,000 lb); by the time it expends propellants to achieve proper orbit, its weight is approximately 6,168 kg (13,598 lb). The satellites will operate in geosynchronous orbit (GEO) orbit; it takes over 100 days for the orbital adjustments to reach its stable geo-position after launch.

== Electronics ==
Uplinks and crosslinks are in the extremely high frequency (EHF) while the downlinks use the super high frequency (SHF). The variety of frequencies used, as well as the desire to have tightly focused downlinks for security, require a range of antennas, seen in the picture:

- 2 SHF downlink phased arrays
- 2 satellite-to-satellite crosslinks
- 2 uplink/downlink nulling antennas
- 1 uplink EHF phased array
- 6 uplink/downlink gimbaled dish antenna
- 1 uplink/downlink Earth coverage horns

Phased array technology is new in communications satellites, but increases reliability by removing the mechanical movement required for gimbaled, motor-driven antennas.

The low gain Earth coverage antennas send information anywhere in a third of the Earth covered by each satellite's footprint. Phased array antennas provide super high-gain earth coverages, enabling worldwide unscheduled access for all users, including small portable terminals and submarines. The six medium resolution coverage antennas (MRCA), are highly directional "spot" coverage; they can be time-shared to cover up to 24 targets. The two high-resolution coverage area antennas enable operations in the presence of in-beam jamming; the nulling antennas are part of the electronic defense that helps discriminate true signals from electronic attack.

Another change from existing satellites is using solid-state transmitters rather than the traveling wave tubes used in most high-power military SHF/EHF applications. TWTs have a fixed power output; the newer devices allow varying the transmitted power, both for lowering the probability of intercept and for overall power efficiency.

The payload flight software contains approximately 500,000 lines of real-time, distributed, embedded code executing simultaneously on 25 on-board processors.

== Services ==
AEHF provides individual digital data streams from rates of 75 bits/second to 8 Megabits/second. These include and go beyond MILSTAR's low data rate (LDR) and medium data rate (MDR) as well as the actually fairly slow high data rate (HDR) for submarines. The faster links are designated extended data rates (XDR).

While there are a number of ground terminals, the airborne terminal has been part of the Family of Advanced Beyond Line-of-Sight-Terminal (FAB-T) project. Other ground stations include the Single-Channel Antijam Man-Portable Terminal (SCAMP), Secure Mobile Anti-jam Reliable Tactical Terminal (SMART-T), and Submarine High Data Rate (Sub HDR) system.

With Boeing as the prime contractor and L-3 Communications and Rockwell Collins as major subcontractors, the first FAB-T (Increment 1) was delivered, for use on the B-2 Spirit aircraft, in February 2009. It is planned for other aircraft including the B-52, RC-135, E-4, and E-6 aircraft. Other installations will go into fixed and transportable command posts. It successfully interoperated with legacy communications using a command post terminal and the Army Single Channel Anti-jam Man Portable Terminal,

== Satellites ==
=== AEHF-1 (USA-214) ===
The first satellite, USA-214, was successfully launched by an Atlas V 531 launch vehicle on 14 August 2010, from Space Launch Complex 41 at the Cape Canaveral Air Force Station (CCAFS). This occurred four years behind schedule; when the contract was awarded in 2000 the first launch was expected to have taken place in 2006. The program was restructured in October 2004, when the National Security Agency (NSA) did not deliver key cryptographic equipment to the payload contractor in time to meet the launch schedule.

==== Successful launch ====
The Atlas V launch vehicle successfully placed the satellite into a supersynchronous-apogee transfer orbit with a perigee of 275 km, an apogee of 50,000 km, an inclination of 22.1°.

==== Failure of the kick motor, and recovery using the Hall-effect thrusters ====
The satellite vehicle's liquid apogee engine (LAE) provided by IHI failed to raise the orbit after two attempts. To solve the problem, the perigee altitude was raised to 4700 km with twelve firings of the smaller Aerojet Rocketdyne-provided Reaction Engine Assembly thrusters, originally intended for attitude control during the LAE engine burns. From this altitude, the solar panels were deployed and the orbit was raised toward the operational orbit over the course of nine months using the 0.27 Newton Hall thrusters, also provided by Aerojet Rocketdyne, a form of electric propulsion which is highly efficient, but low thrust. This took much longer than initially intended due to the lower starting altitude for the HCT maneuvers. This led to program delays, as the second and third satellite vehicle LAEs were analyzed.

A Government Accountability Office (GAO) report released in July 2011 stated that the blocked fuel line in the liquid apogee engine was most likely caused by a piece of cloth inadvertently left in the line during the manufacturing process. While this is believed to have been the primary cause of the failure, a U.S. Department of Defense Selected Acquisition Report adds that fuel loading procedures and unmet thermal control requirements could also have contributed. The remaining satellites were declared flight-ready a month prior to the release of the GAO report.

=== AEHF-2 (USA-235) ===
Like the first AEHF satellite, the second (AEHF-2) was launched on an Atlas V flying in the 531 configuration. The launch from Space Launch Complex 41 at Cape Canaveral took place on 4 May 2012. After three months of maneuvering, it reached its proper position and the testing procedures were started. Completion of checkout of AEHF-2 was announced on 14 November 2012 and control turned over to the 14th Air Force for operations for an expected 14-year service life through 2026.

=== AEHF-3 (USA-246) ===
The third AEHF satellite was launched from Cape Canaveral on 18 September 2013 at 08:10 UTC. The two-hour window to launch the satellite opened at 07:04 UTC and the launch occurred as soon as weather-related clouds and high-altitude winds cleared sufficiently to meet the launch criteria.

=== AEHF-4 (USA-288) ===
The fourth AEHF satellite was launched on 17 October 2018 from Cape Canaveral at 04:15 UTC using an Atlas V 551 rocket operated by the United Launch Alliance (ULA).

=== AEHF-5 (USA-292) ===
The fifth AEHF satellite was launched on 8 August 2019 from Cape Canaveral at 10:13 UTC using an Atlas V 551 rocket. A secondary payload named TDO-1 accompanied the AEHF-5 satellite into orbit.

=== AEHF-6 (USA-298) ===
The sixth AEHF satellite was launched on 26 March 2020 at 20:18 UTC by an Atlas V 551 from Cape Canaveral Space Force Station (CCSFS), SLC-41. It was the first launch of a U.S. Space Force mission since the establishment of the new military service.

== See also ==
- Wideband Global SATCOM system (WGS)
