= Atlas V =

Expendable launch system

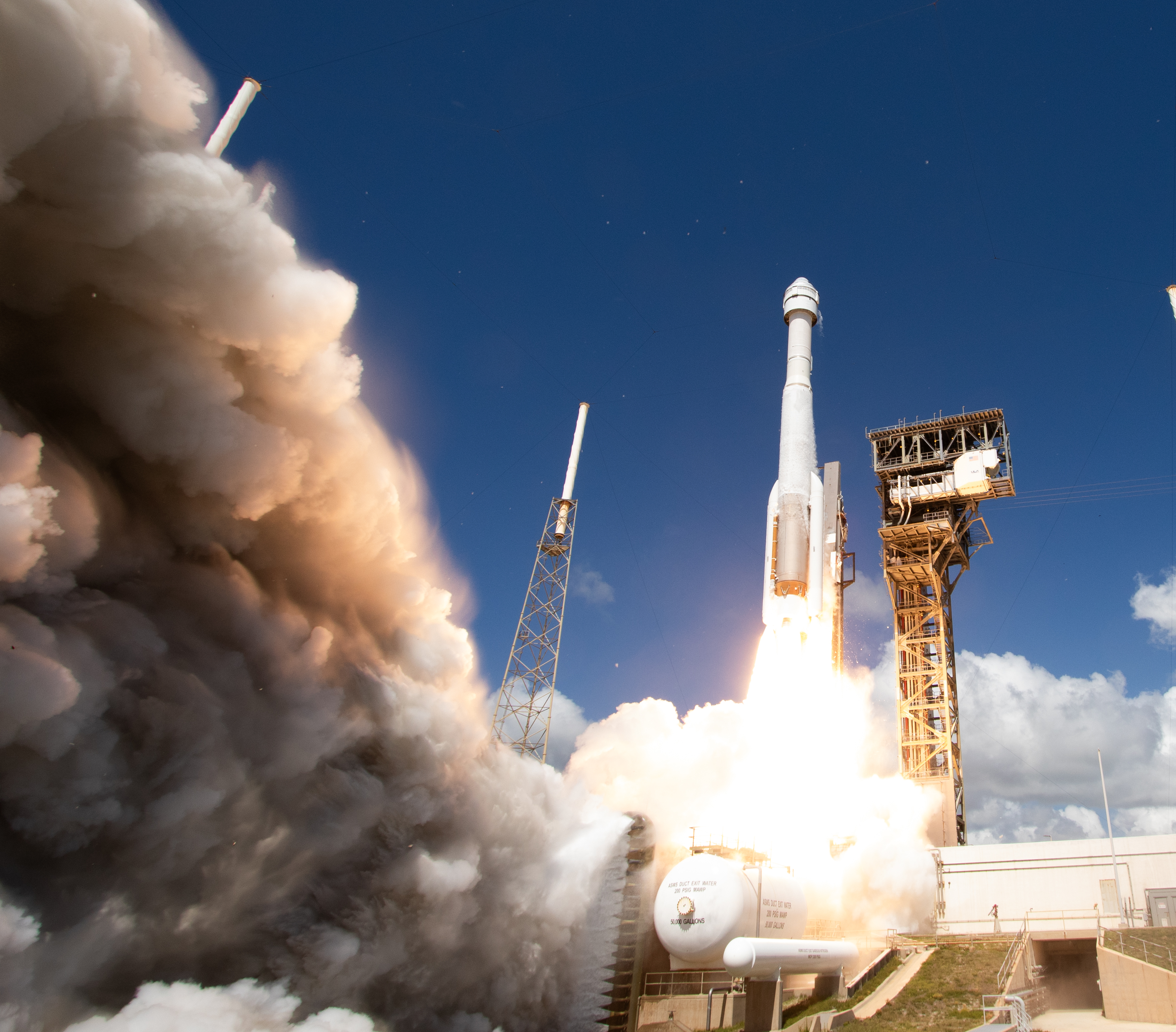
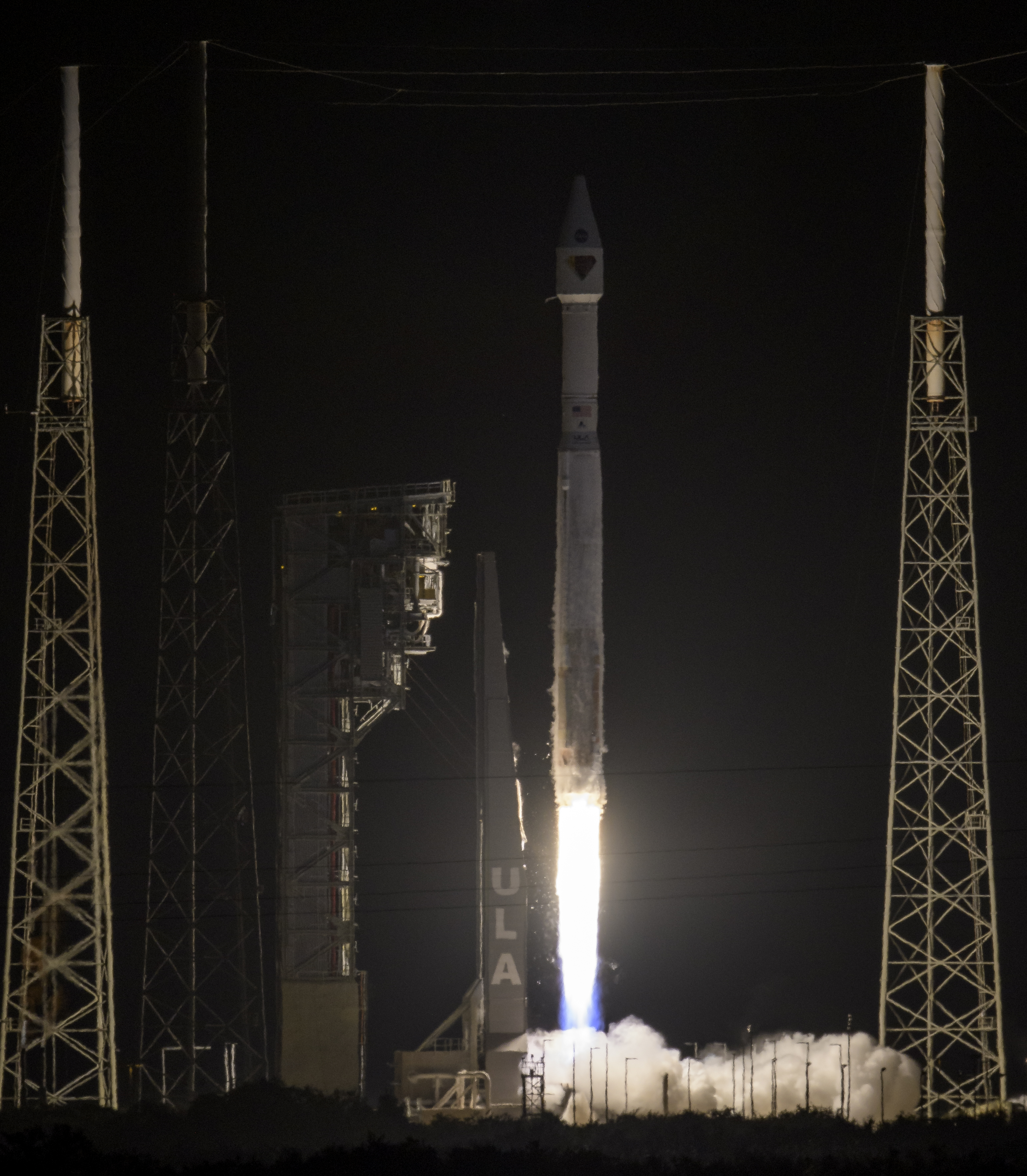
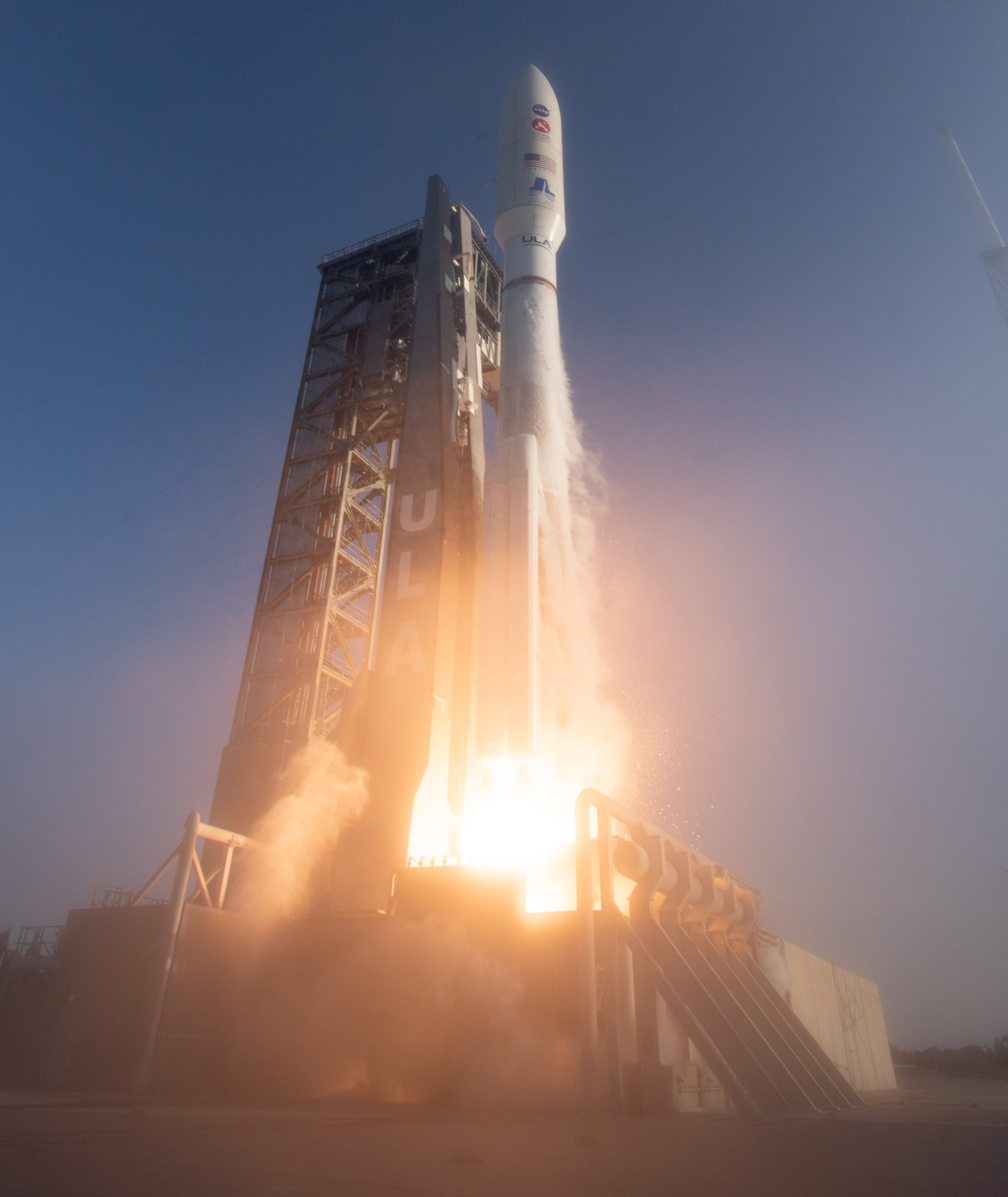
- Top: Atlas V N22 with the Boeing Crew Flight Test carrying Barry Wilmore and Sunita Williams. Left: Atlas V 401 carrying the Lucy spacecraft to an exploration of Trojan asteroids around Jupiter Right: Atlas V 541 carrying the Perseverance rover to Mars
- Function: Medium-lift launch vehicle
- Manufacturer: United Launch Alliance
- Country of origin: United States
- Cost per launch: US$110–153 million (2016)

Size
- Height: Up to 58.3 m (191 ft)
- Diameter: 3.81 m (12.5 ft)
- Mass: 590,000 kg (1,300,000 lb)
- Stages: 2

Capacity

Payload to LEO
- Orbital inclination: 28.70°
- Mass: 8,210–18,850 kg (18,100–41,560 lb)

Payload to GTO
- Mass: 4,750–8,900 kg (10,470–19,620 lb)

Associated rockets
- Family: Atlas
- Based on: Atlas III
- Comparable: Delta IV; Falcon 9; Long March 3B; LVM3; Proton-M; Saturn IB

Launch history
- Status: Active, retiring
- Launch sites: Cape Canaveral, SLC-41; Vandenberg, SLC-3 (until 2022)
- Total launches: 110: 401: 41; 411: 6; 421: 9; 431: 3; 501: 8; 511: 1; 521: 2; 531: 5; 541: 9; 551: 23; N22: 3
- Success(es): 109: 401: 40; 411: 6; 421: 9; 431: 3; 501: 8; 511: 1; 521: 2; 531: 5; 541: 9; 551: 23; N22: 3
- Partial failures: 1: 401: 1; 411: 0; 421: 0; 431: 0; 501: 0; 511: 0; 521: 0; 531: 0; 541: 0; 551: 0; N22: 0
- First flight: August 21, 2002 (Hot Bird 6)
- Last flight: July 2, 2026 (LeoSat LA-08, most recent)

Boosters – AJ-60A
- No. boosters: 0 to 5
- Height: 17 m (56 ft)
- Diameter: 1.6 m (5 ft 3 in)
- Gross mass: 46,697 kg (102,949 lb)
- Propellant mass: 42,630 kg (93,980 lb)
- Maximum thrust: 1,688.4 kN (379,600 lb_{f})
- Specific impulse: 279.3 s (2.739 km/s)
- Burn time: 94 seconds
- Propellant: AP / HTPB / Al

Boosters – GEM 63
- No. boosters: 0 to 5
- Height: 20.1 m (66 ft)
- Diameter: 1.6 m (63 in)
- Gross mass: 49,300 kg (108,700 lb)
- Propellant mass: 44,200 kg (97,400 lb)
- Maximum thrust: 1,663 kN (374,000 lb_{f})
- Burn time: 94 seconds
- Propellant: AP / HTPB / Al

First stage – Atlas CCB
- Height: 32.46 m (106.5 ft)
- Diameter: 3.81 m (12.5 ft)
- Empty mass: 21,054 kg (46,416 lb)
- Propellant mass: 284,089 kg (626,309 lb)
- Powered by: 1 × RD-180
- Maximum thrust: SL: 3,827 kN (860,000 lb_{f}); vac: 4,152 kN (933,000 lb_{f})
- Specific impulse: SL: 311.3 s (3.053 km/s); vac: 337.8 s (3.313 km/s)
- Burn time: 253 seconds
- Propellant: RP-1 / LOX

Second stage – Centaur III
- Height: 12.68 m (41.6 ft)
- Diameter: 3.05 m (10.0 ft)
- Empty mass: 2,316 kg (5,106 lb)
- Propellant mass: 20,830 kg (45,920 lb)
- Powered by: 1 × RL10A, 2 × RL10A or 1 × RL10C
- Maximum thrust: 99.2 kN (22,300 lb_{f}) (RL10A)
- Specific impulse: 450.5 s (4.418 km/s) (RL10A)
- Burn time: 842 seconds (RL10A)
- Propellant: LH_{2} / LOX

Atlas V (Note: Pronounced "Atlas five"; "V" is the Roman numeral for 5.) is an expendable launch system and the fifth major version in the Atlas launch vehicle family. It was developed by Lockheed Martin and has been operated by United Launch Alliance (ULA) (Note: ULA is a joint venture between Lockheed Martin and Boeing.) since 2006. Primarily used to launch payloads for the United States Department of Defense, NASA, and commercial customers, Atlas V is the longest-serving active rocket in the United States.

Each Atlas V vehicle consists of two main stages. The first stage is powered by a single Russian-made RD-180 engine that burns kerosene and liquid oxygen. The Centaur upper stage uses one or two American-made Aerojet Rocketdyne RL10 engines that burn liquid hydrogen and liquid oxygen. Strap-on solid rocket boosters (SRBs) are used in several configurations. Originally equipped with AJ-60A SRBs, the vehicle switched to Graphite-Epoxy Motor (GEM 63) boosters beginning in November 2020, except for flights in the Boeing Starliner program. Standard payload fairings measured either 4.2 m (14 ft) or 5.4 m (18 ft) in diameter, with multiple available lengths.

In August 2021, ULA announced that Atlas V would be retired and all remaining launches had been sold. Production of the rocket ended in 2024. As of July 2026, six rockets remain, all of which are slated to launch Starliner missions. Future ULA launches will use the Vulcan Centaur rocket, which was designed in part to comply with a Congressional mandate to phase out use of the Russian-made RD-180 engine.

== Vehicle description ==
The Atlas V was developed by Lockheed Martin Commercial Launch Services (LMCLS) as part of the U.S. Air Force Evolved Expendable Launch Vehicle (EELV) program and made its inaugural flight on August 21, 2002. The vehicle operates from SLC-41 at Cape Canaveral Space Force Station (CCSFS). It also operated from SLC-3E at Vandenberg Space Force Base until 2022. LMCLS continued to market the Atlas V to commercial customers worldwide until January 2018, when United Launch Alliance (ULA) assumed control of commercial marketing and sales.

=== Atlas V first stage ===
The Atlas V first stage, the Common Core Booster (not to be confused with the Delta IV's Common Booster Core), is 3.8 m (12 ft) in diameter and 32.5 m (107 ft) in length. It is powered by one Russian NPO Energomash RD-180 main engine burning 284,450 kg (627,100 lb) of liquid oxygen and RP-1. The booster operates for about four minutes, providing about 4 MN (900,000 lb_{f}) of thrust. Thrust can be augmented with up to five Aerojet AJ-60A or Northrop Grumman GEM 63 strap-on solid rocket boosters, each providing an additional 1.27 MN (290,000 lb_{f}) of thrust for 94 seconds.

The main differences between the Atlas V and earlier Atlas I and II family launch vehicles are:

- The first stage tanks no longer use stainless steel monocoque pressure stabilized "balloon" construction. The tanks are isogrid aluminum and remain structurally stable when unpressurized.
- Accommodation points for parallel stages, both smaller solids and identical liquids, are built into first-stage structures.
- The "1.5 staging" technique is no longer used, having been discontinued on the Atlas III with the introduction of the Russian RD-180 engine.
- The main-stage diameter increased from 3.0 to 3.7 m (9.8 to 12.1 ft).

=== Centaur III upper stage ===
The Centaur III upper stage uses a pressure-stabilized propellant-tank design and cryogenic propellants. The Centaur III was first introduced for use on the Atlas III and was stretched 1.7 m (5 ft 7 in) relative to the Centaur II used on the Atlas II. It is powered by either one or two Aerojet Rocketdyne RL10 engines, each developing a thrust of up to 101.8 kN (22,900 lb_{f}). The inertial navigation unit (INU) located on the Centaur provides guidance and navigation for both the Atlas and Centaur and controls both Atlas and Centaur tank pressures and propellant use. The Centaur engines are capable of multiple in-space starts, making possible insertion into low Earth parking orbit, followed by a coast period and then insertion into GTO. A subsequent third burn following a multi-hour coast can permit direct injection of payloads into geostationary orbit.

When the Atlas V was introduced, the Centaur III was alternatively called the Common Centaur, reflecting its use on both the Atlas III and V. As of 2006, the Centaur III had the highest proportion of burnable propellant relative to total mass of any modern hydrogen upper stage and hence can deliver substantial payloads to a high-energy state.

=== Payload fairing ===
Atlas V payload fairings are available in two diameters, depending on satellite requirements. The 4.2 m (14 ft) diameter fairing, originally designed for the Atlas II booster, comes in three different lengths: the original 9 m (30 ft) version and extended 10 and 11 m (33 and 36 ft) versions, first flown respectively on the AV-008/Astra 1KR and AV-004/Inmarsat-4 F1 missions. Fairings of up to 7.2 m (24 ft) diameter and 32.3 m (106 ft) length have been considered but were never implemented.

A 5.4 m (18 ft) diameter fairing, with an internally usable diameter of 4.57 m (15.0 ft), was developed and built by RUAG Space in Switzerland. The RUAG fairing uses carbon fiber composite construction and is based on a similar flight-proven fairing for the Ariane 5. Three configurations are manufactured to support the Atlas V: 20.7 m (68 ft), 23.4 m (77 ft), and 26.5 m (87 ft) long. While the classic 4.2 m (14 ft) fairing covers only the payload, the RUAG fairing is much longer and fully encloses both the Centaur upper stage and the payload.

== Upgrades ==
Many systems on the Atlas V have been the subject of upgrade and enhancement both prior to the first Atlas V flight and since that time. Work on a Fault Tolerant Inertial Navigation Unit (FTINU) started in 2001 to enhance mission reliability for Atlas vehicles by replacing the earlier non-redundant navigation and computing equipment with a fault-tolerant unit. The upgraded FTINU first flew in 2006, and in 2010 a follow-on order for more FTINU units was awarded.

In 2015, ULA announced that the Aerojet Rocketdyne-produced AJ-60A solid rocket boosters (SRBs) then in use on Atlas V would be superseded by new GEM 63 boosters produced by Northrop Grumman Innovation Systems. The extended GEM 63XL boosters will also be used on the Vulcan Centaur launch vehicle that will replace the Atlas V. The first Atlas V launch with GEM 63 boosters happened on November 13, 2020.

== Human-rating certification ==
Proposals and design work to human-rate the Atlas V began as early as 2006, with ULA's parent company Lockheed Martin reporting an agreement with Bigelow Aerospace that was intended to lead to commercial private trips to low Earth orbit (LEO).

Human-rating design and simulation work began in earnest in 2010, with the award of US$6.7 million in the first phase of the NASA Commercial Crew Program (CCP) to develop an Emergency Detection System (EDS).

As of February 2011, ULA had received an extension to April 2011 from NASA and was finishing up work on the EDS.

NASA solicited proposals for CCP phase 2 in October 2010, and ULA proposed to complete design work on the EDS. At the time, NASA's goal was to get astronauts to orbit by 2015. Then-ULA President and CEO Michael Gass stated that a schedule acceleration to 2014 was possible if funded. Other than the addition of the Emergency Detection System, no major changes were expected to the Atlas V rocket, but ground infrastructure modifications were planned. The most likely candidate for the human-rating was the N02 configuration, with no fairing, no solid rocket boosters, and dual RL10 engines on the Centaur upper stage.

On July 18, 2011, NASA and ULA announced an agreement on the possibility of certifying the Atlas V to NASA's standards for human spaceflight. ULA agreed to provide NASA with data on the Atlas V, while NASA would provide ULA with draft human certification requirements. In 2011, the human-rated Atlas V was also still under consideration to carry spaceflight participants to the proposed Bigelow Commercial Space Station.

In 2011, Sierra Nevada Corporation (SNC) picked the Atlas V to be the booster for its still-under-development Dream Chaser crewed spaceplane. The Dream Chaser was intended to launch on an Atlas V, fly a crew to the ISS, and land horizontally following a lifting-body reentry. However, in late 2014 NASA did not select the Dream Chaser to be one of the two vehicles selected under the Commercial Crew competition.

On August 4, 2011, Boeing announced that it would use the Atlas V as the initial launch vehicle for its CST-100 crew capsule. CST-100 will take NASA astronauts to the International Space Station (ISS) and was also intended to service the proposed Bigelow Commercial Space Station. A three-flight test program was projected to be completed by 2015, certifying the Atlas V/CST-100 combination for human spaceflight operations. The first flight was expected to include an Atlas V rocket integrated with an uncrewed CST-100 capsule, the second flight an in-flight launch abort system demonstration in the middle of that year, and the third flight a crewed mission carrying two Boeing test-pilot astronauts into LEO and returning them safely at the end of 2015. These plans were delayed by many years and morphed along the way so that in the end, the first orbital test flight with no crew materialized in 2019, but it was a failure and needed to be reflown in 2022, the in-flight launch abort system test flight did not materialize, and the third flight, a crewed orbital test flight with two astronauts (in the end NASA's, not Boeing's astronauts) materialized in June 2024 as Boeing Crewed Flight Test. The launch abort system was tested in 2019 in the Boeing Pad Abort Test. The spacecraft launched from a test stand, not from an Atlas V.

In 2014, NASA selected the Boeing Starliner CST-100 spacecraft as part of the Commercial Crew Program. Atlas V is the launch vehicle for Starliner. The first launch of an uncrewed Starliner, the Boeing OFT mission, occurred atop a human-rated Atlas V on the morning of December 20, 2019; the mission failed to meet goals due to a spacecraft failure, though the Atlas V launcher performed well. In 2022, an Atlas V launched an uncrewed Starliner capsule for the second time on Boe-OFT 2 mission; the launch was a success.

In June 2024, on Boe-CFT mission, Atlas V carried humans into space for the first time, successfully launching two NASA astronauts to the ISS.

== Amazon Leo ==
Amazon selected the Atlas V to launch some of the satellites for Amazon Leo, formerly known as Project Kuiper. Amazon Leo will offer a high-speed satellite internet constellation service. The contract signed with Amazon was for all nine remaining available Atlas V rockets. Amazon Leo aims to put thousands of satellites into orbit. ULA is Amazon's first launch provider. Two test satellites were launched on Atlas V in 2023 because their originally-contracted launch vehicles were not available on time. The remaining eight Atlas V Amazon Leo launches each carried a full payload of production Leo satellites. Most of the Amazon Leo constellation will use other launch vehicles. The first launch of an Atlas V carrying the first batch of 27 production Leo satellites launched on April 28, 2025, and the eighth and final Atlas V production Leo launch occurred on July 2, 2026.

== Versions ==
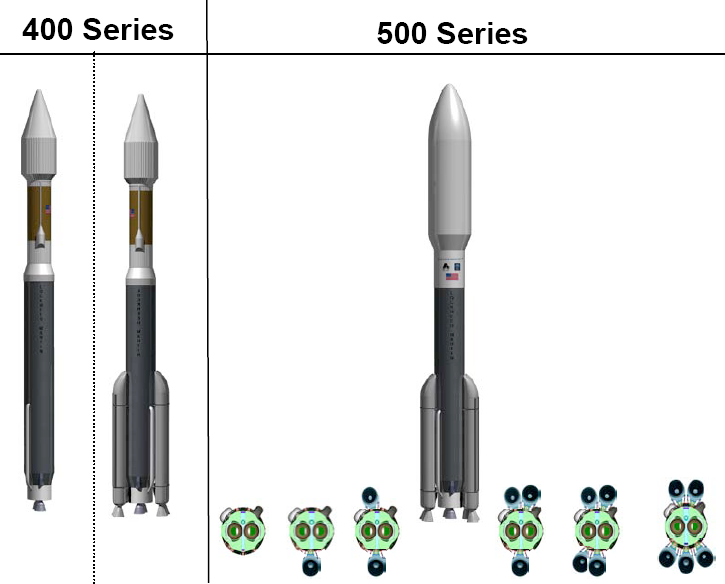
Atlas V family with asymmetric SRBs.

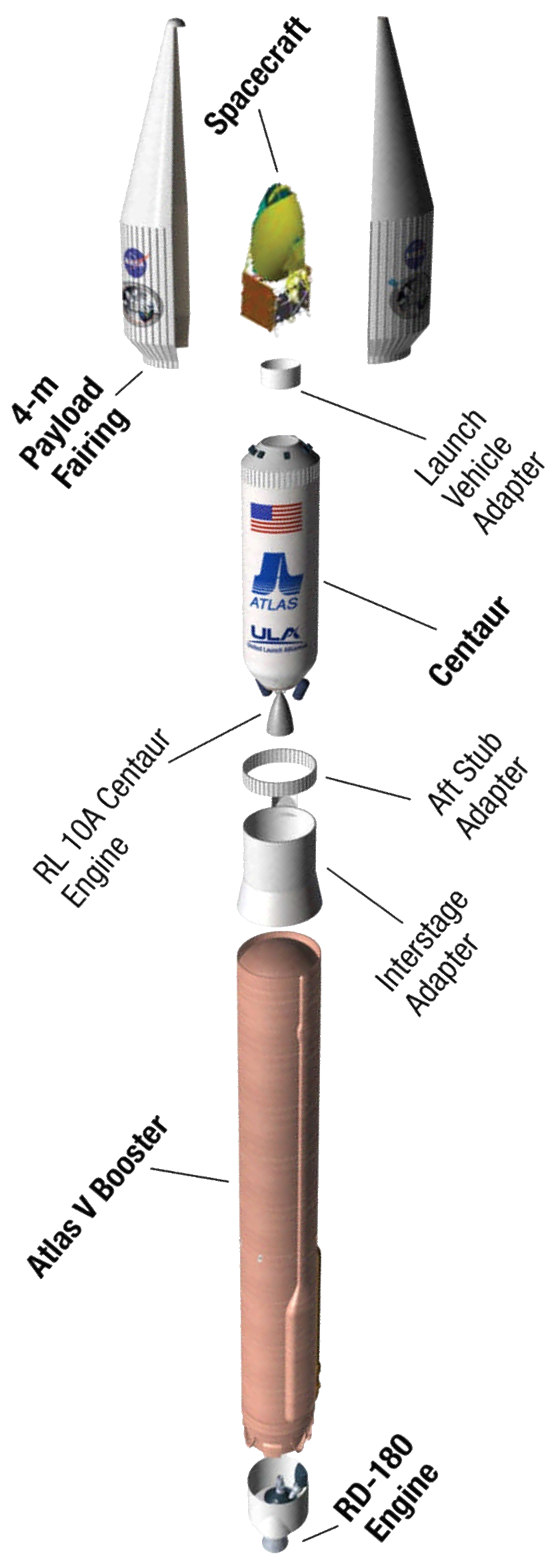
Atlas V 401

Each Atlas V configuration has a three-digit designation.

The first digit shows the diameter (in meters) of the payload fairing and has a value of "4" or "5" for fairing launches and "N" for crew capsule launches (as no payload fairing is used).

The second digit indicates the number of solid rocket boosters (SRBs) attached to the core of the launch vehicle and can range from "0" through "3" with the 4 m (13 ft) fairing, and "0" through "5" with the 5 m (16 ft) fairing. As seen in the first image, all SRB layouts are asymmetrical.

The third digit represents the number of engines on the Centaur stage, either "1" or "2". All of the configurations use the Single Engine Centaur, except for the "N22" which is only used on Starliner crew capsule missions, and uses the Dual Engine Centaur.

Atlas V has flown in eleven configurations:

Active Retired

Atlas V configurations
| Version | Fairing | SRBs | Centaur engines | Payload, kg | | Launches to date | Base price |
| Version | Fairing | SRBs | Centaur engines | to LEO (Note: At an inclination of 28.5°) | to GTO | Launches to date | Base price |
|---|---|---|---|---|---|---|---|
| 401 | 4 m | – | 1 | 9,797 | 4,750 | 41 | US$109 million |
| 411 | 4 m | 1 | 1 | 12,150 | 5,950 | 6 | US$115 million |
| 421 | 4 m | 2 | 1 | 14,067 | 6,890 | 9 | US$123 million |
| 431 | 4 m | 3 | 1 | 15,718 | 7,700 | 3 | US$130 million |
| 501 | 5.4 m | – | 1 | 8,123 | 3,775 | 8 | US$120 million |
| 511 | 5.4 m | 1 | 1 | 10,986 | 5,250 | 1 | US$130 million |
| 521 | 5.4 m | 2 | 1 | 13,490 | 6,475 | 2 | US$135 million |
| 531 | 5.4 m | 3 | 1 | 15,575 | 7,475 | 5 | US$140 million |
| 541 | 5.4 m | 4 | 1 | 17,443 | 8,290 | 9 | US$145 million |
| 551 | 5.4 m | 5 | 1 | 18,814 | 8,900 | 23 | US$153 million |
| N22 (Note: for Boeing Starliner) | None | 2 (Note: Only uses the AJ-60A SRB.) | 2 | 13,250 (to ISS) | | 3 | – |

=== Launch cost ===
Before 2016, pricing information for Atlas V launches was limited. In 2010, NASA contracted with ULA to launch the MAVEN mission on an Atlas V 401 for approximately US$187 million. The 2013 cost of this configuration for the U.S. Air Force under their block buy of 36 launch vehicles was US$164 million. In 2015, the TDRS-M launch on an Atlas 401 cost NASA US$132.4 million.

Starting in 2016, ULA provided pricing for the Atlas V through its RocketBuilder website, advertising a base price for each launch vehicle configuration, which ranges from US$109 million for the 401 up to US$153 million for the 551. Each additional SRB adds an average of US$6.8 million to the cost of the launch vehicle. Customers can also choose to purchase larger payload fairings or additional launch service options. NASA and Air Force launch costs are often higher than equivalent commercial missions due to additional government accounting, analysis, processing, and mission assurance requirements, which can add US$30–80 million to the cost of a launch.

In 2013, launch costs for commercial satellites to GTO averaged about US$100 million, significantly lower than historic Atlas V pricing. However, after the rise of reusable rockets, the price of an Atlas V [401] has dropped from approximately US$180 million to US$109 million, in large part due to competitive pressure that emerged in the launch services marketplace during the early 2010s. ULA CEO Tory Bruno stated in 2016 that ULA needs at least two commercial missions each year in order to stay profitable going forward. ULA is not attempting to win these missions on purely lowest purchase price, stating that it "would rather be the best value provider". In 2016, ULA suggested that customers would have much lower insurance and delay costs because of the high Atlas V reliability and schedule certainty, making overall customer costs close to that of using competitors like the SpaceX Falcon 9.

=== Historically proposed versions ===
In 2006, ULA offered an Atlas V Heavy option that would use three Common Core Booster (CCB) stages strapped together to lift a 29,400 kg (64,800 lb) payload to low Earth orbit 13,000 kg (29,000 lb) payload to Geostationary transfer orbit. ULA stated at the time that 95% of the hardware required for the Atlas V Heavy has already been flown on the Atlas V single-core vehicles. The lifting capability of the proposed launch vehicle was to be roughly equivalent to the Delta IV Heavy, which used RS-68 engines developed and produced domestically by Aerojet Rocketdyne.

A 2006 report, prepared by the RAND Corporation for the Office of the Secretary of Defense, stated that Lockheed Martin had decided not to develop an Atlas V heavy-lift vehicle (HLV). The report recommended for the U.S. Air Force and the National Reconnaissance Office (NRO) to "determine the necessity of an EELV heavy-lift variant, including development of an Atlas V Heavy", and to "resolve the RD-180 issue, including coproduction, stockpile, or United States development of an RD-180 replacement".

In 2010, ULA stated that the Atlas V Heavy variant could be available to customers 30 months from the date of order.

Atlas V PH2

In late 2006, the Atlas V program gained access to the tooling and processes for 5-meter-diameter stages used on Delta IV when Boeing and Lockheed Martin space operations were merged into the United Launch Alliance. This led to a proposal to combine the 5-meter-diameter Delta IV tankage production processes with dual RD-180 engines, resulting in the Atlas Phase 2.

An Atlas V PH2-Heavy consisting of three 5-meter stages in parallel with six RD-180s was considered in the Augustine Report as a possible heavy lifter for use in future space missions, as well as the Shuttle-derived Ares V and Ares V Lite. If built, the Atlas PH2-Heavy was projected to be able to launch a payload mass of approximately 70 t (69 long tons; 77 short tons) into an orbit of 28.5° inclination.

Booster for GX rocket

The Atlas V Common Core Booster was to have been used as the first stage of the joint US-Japanese GX rocket, which was scheduled to make its first flight in 2012. GX launches would have been from the Atlas V launch complex at Vandenberg Air Force Base, SLC-3E. However, the Japanese government decided to cancel the GX project in December 2009.

Out-licensing rejected by ULA

In May 2015, a consortium of companies, including Aerojet and Dynetics, sought to license the production or manufacturing rights to the Atlas V using the Aerojet Rocketdyne AR1 engine in place of the RD-180. The proposal was rejected by ULA.

== Atlas V launches ==
| Flight No. | Date and time (UTC) | Type | Serial no. | Launch site | Payload | Type of payload | Orbit | Outcome | Remarks |
|---|---|---|---|---|---|---|---|---|---|
| 1 | August 21, 2002; 22:05 | 401 | AV-001 | Cape Canaveral, SLC-41 | Hot Bird 6 | Commercial communications satellite (comsat) | GTO | Success | First Atlas V launch |
| 2 | May 13, 2003; 22:10 | 401 | AV-002 | Cape Canaveral, SLC-41 | Hellas Sat 2 | Commercial comsat | GTO | Success | First satellite for Greece and Cyprus |
| 3 | July 17, 2003; 23:45 | 521 | AV-003 | Cape Canaveral, SLC-41 | Rainbow-1 | Commercial comsat | GTO | Success | First Atlas V 500 launch First Atlas V launch with SRBs |
| 4 | December 17, 2004; 12:07 | 521 | AV-005 | Cape Canaveral, SLC-41 | AMC-16 | Commercial comsat | GTO | Success | Last flight of the 521 configuration |
| 5 | March 11, 2005; 21:42 | 431 | AV-004 | Cape Canaveral, SLC-41 | Inmarsat-4 F1 | Commercial comsat | GTO | Success | First Atlas V 400 launch with SRBs |
| 6 | August 12, 2005; 11:43 | 401 | AV-007 | Cape Canaveral, SLC-41 | Mars Reconnaissance Orbiter (MRO) | Mars orbiter | Heliocentric to Areocentric | Success | First Atlas V launch for NASA |
| 7 | January 19, 2006; 19:00 | 551 | AV-010 | Cape Canaveral, SLC-41 | New Horizons | Pluto and Kuiper Belt probe | Hyperbolic | Success | Star 48B third stage used, only Atlas V launch with a third stage. |
| 8 | April 20, 2006; 20:27 | 411 | AV-008 | Cape Canaveral, SLC-41 | Astra 1KR | Commercial comsat | GTO | Success | |
| 9 | March 9, 2007; 03:10 | 401 | AV-013 | Cape Canaveral, SLC-41 | Space Test Program-1 | 6 military research satellites | LEO | Success | First ULA Atlas launch; First Atlas V night launch; First three-burn Atlas V mission; Orbital Express; FalconSAT-3 |
| 10 | June 15, 2007; 15:12 | 401 | AV-009 | Cape Canaveral, SLC-41 | USA-194 (NROL-30/NOSS-4-3A and -4-3B) | Two NRO Reconnaissance satellites | LEO | Partial failure | First Atlas V flight for the National Reconnaissance Office Atlas did not achieve the intended orbit, but payload compensated for shortfall. NRO declared the mission a success. |
| 11 | October 11, 2007; 00:22 | 421 | AV-011 | Cape Canaveral, SLC-41 | USA-195 (WGS-1) | Military comsat | GTO | Success | Valve replacement delayed launch. |
| 12 | December 10, 2007; 22:05 | 401 | AV-015 | Cape Canaveral, SLC-41 | USA-198 (NROL-24) | NRO reconnaissance satellite | Molniya | Success | |
| 13 | March 13, 2008; 10:02 | 411 | AV-006 | Vandenberg, SLC-3E | USA-200 (NROL-28) | NRO reconnaissance satellite | Molniya | Success | First Atlas V launch from Vandenberg. |
| 14 | April 14, 2008; 20:12 | 421 | AV-014 | Cape Canaveral, SLC-41 | ICO G1 | Commercial comsat | GTO | Success | Lockheed Martin Commercial Launch Services launch; Heaviest payload launched by an Atlas until the launch of MUOS-1 in 2012.; Largest comsat in the world at time of launch until the launch of TerreStar-1 in 2009 by Ariane 5 and then Telstar 19V on July 21, 2018, by Falcon 9. |
| 15 | April 4, 2009; 00:31 | 421 | AV-016 | Cape Canaveral, SLC-41 | USA-204 (WGS-2) | Military comsat | GTO | Success | |
| 16 | June 18, 2009; 21:32 | 401 | AV-020 | Cape Canaveral, SLC-41 | LRO/LCROSS | Lunar exploration | HEO to Lunar | Success | First Centaur stage to impact on the Moon. |
| 17 | September 8, 2009; 21:35 | 401 | AV-018 | Cape Canaveral, SLC-41 | USA-207 (Palladium At Night - PAN) | Military comsat | GTO | Success | The Centaur upper stage fragmented in orbit about March 24, 2019. |
| 18 | October 18, 2009; 16:12 | 401 | AV-017 | Vandenberg, SLC-3E | USA-210 (DMSP 5D3-F18) | Military weather satellite | LEO | Success | |
| 19 | November 23, 2009; 06:55 | 431 | AV-024 | Cape Canaveral, SLC-41 | Intelsat 14 | Commercial comsat | GTO | Success | LMCLS launch |
| 20 | February 11, 2010; 15:23 | 401 | AV-021 | Cape Canaveral, SLC-41 | SDO | Solar telescope | GTO | Success | |
| 21 | April 22, 2010; 23:52 | 501 | AV-012 | Cape Canaveral, SLC-41 | USA-212 (X-37B OTV-1) | Military orbital test vehicle | LEO | Success | A piece of the external fairing did not break up on impact, but washed up on Hilton Head Island. |
| 22 | August 14, 2010; 11:07 | 531 | AV-019 | Cape Canaveral, SLC-41 | USA-214 (AEHF-1) | Military comsat | GTO | Success | |
| 23 | September 21, 2010; 04:03 | 501 | AV-025 | Vandenberg, SLC-3E | USA-215 (NROL-41) | NRO reconnaissance satellite | LEO | Success | |
| 24 | March 5, 2011; 22:46 | 501 | AV-026 | Cape Canaveral, SLC-41 | USA-226 (X-37B OTV-2) | Military orbital test vehicle | LEO | Success | |
| 25 | April 15, 2011; 04:24 | 411 | AV-027 | Vandenberg, SLC-3E | USA-229 (NROL-34) | NRO reconnaissance satellite | LEO | Success | |
| 26 | May 7, 2011; 18:10 | 401 | AV-022 | Cape Canaveral, SLC-41 | USA-230 (SBIRS GEO-1) | Missile Warning satellite | GTO | Success | |
| 27 | August 5, 2011; 16:25 | 551 | AV-029 | Cape Canaveral, SLC-41 | Juno | Jupiter orbiter | Hyperbolic to Jovicentric | Success | |
| 28 | November 26, 2011; 15:02 | 541 | AV-028 | Cape Canaveral, SLC-41 | Mars Science Laboratory (MSL) | Mars rover | Hyperbolic (Mars landing) | Success | First launch of the 541 configuration Centaur entered orbit around the Sun. |
| 29 | February 24, 2012; 22:15 | 551 | AV-030 | Cape Canaveral, SLC-41 | MUOS-1 | Military comsat | GTO | Success | 200th Centaur launch; Heaviest payload launched by an Atlas until launch of MUOS-2 |
| 30 | May 4, 2012; 18:42 | 531 | AV-031 | Cape Canaveral, SLC-41 | USA-235 (AEHF-2) | Military comsat | GTO | Success | |
| 31 | June 20, 2012; 12:28 | 401 | AV-023 | Cape Canaveral, SLC-41 | USA-236 (NROL-38) | NRO reconnaissance satellite | GTO | Success | 50th EELV launch |
| 32 | August 30, 2012; 08:05 | 401 | AV-032 | Cape Canaveral, SLC-41 | Van Allen Probes (RBSP) | Van Allen Belts exploration | HEO | Success | |
| 33 | September 13, 2012; 21:39 | 401 | AV-033 | Vandenberg, SLC-3E | USA-238 (NROL-36) | NRO reconnaissance satellites | LEO | Success | |
| 34 | December 11, 2012; 18:03 | 501 | AV-034 | Cape Canaveral, SLC-41 | USA-240 (X-37B OTV-3) | Military orbital test vehicle | LEO | Success | |
| 35 | January 31, 2013; 01:48 | 401 | AV-036 | Cape Canaveral, SLC-41 | TDRS-K (TDRS-11) | Data relay satellite | GTO | Success | |
| 36 | February 11, 2013; 18:02 | 401 | AV-035 | Vandenberg, SLC-3E | Landsat 8 | Earth Observation satellite | LEO | Success | First West Coast Atlas V Launch for NASA |
| 37 | March 19, 2013; 21:21 | 401 | AV-037 | Cape Canaveral, SLC-41 | USA-241 (SBIRS GEO 2) | Missile Warning satellite | GTO | Success | |
| 38 | May 15, 2013; 21:38 | 401 | AV-039 | Cape Canaveral, SLC-41 | USA-242 (GPS IIF-4) | Navigation satellite | MEO | Success | First GPS satellite launched by an Atlas V |
| 39 | July 19, 2013; 13:00 | 551 | AV-040 | Cape Canaveral, SLC-41 | MUOS-2 | Military comsat | GTO | Success | |
| 40 | September 18, 2013; 08:10 | 531 | AV-041 | Cape Canaveral, SLC-41 | USA-246 (AEHF-3) | Military comsat | GTO | Success | |
| 41 | November 18, 2013; 18:28 | 401 | AV-038 | Cape Canaveral, SLC-41 | MAVEN | Mars orbiter | Hyperbolic to Areocentric | Success | |
| 42 | December 6, 2013; 07:14:30 | 501 | AV-042 | Vandenberg, SLC-3E | USA-247 (NROL-39) | NRO reconnaissance satellite | Low Earth orbit | Success | |
| 43 | January 24, 2014; 02:33 | 401 | AV-043 | Cape Canaveral, SLC-41 | TDRS-L (TDRS-12) | Data relay satellite | GTO | Success | |
| 44 | April 3, 2014; 14:46 | 401 | AV-044 | Vandenberg, SLC-3E | USA-249 (DMSP-5D3 F19) | Military weather satellite | Low Earth orbit | Success | 50th RD-180 launch |
| 45 | April 10, 2014; 17:45 | 541 | AV-045 | Cape Canaveral, SLC-41 | USA-250 (NROL-67) | NRO reconnaissance satellite | GTO | Success | |
| 46 | May 22, 2014; 13:09 | 401 | AV-046 | Cape Canaveral, SLC-41 | USA-252 (NROL-33) | NRO reconnaissance satellite | GTO | Success | |
| 47 | August 2, 2014; 03:23 | 401 | AV-048 | Cape Canaveral, SLC-41 | USA-256 (GPS IIF-7) | Navigation satellite | MEO | Success | |
| 48 | August 13, 2014; 18:30 | 401 | AV-047 | Vandenberg, SLC-3E | WorldView-3 | Earth imaging satellite | Low Earth orbit | Success | |
| 49 | September 17, 2014; 00:10 | 401 | AV-049 | Cape Canaveral, SLC-41 | USA-257 (CLIO) | Military comsat | GTO | Success | The Centaur upper stage fragmented on August 31, 2018 |
| 50 | October 29, 2014; 17:21 | 401 | AV-050 | Cape Canaveral, SLC-41 | USA-258 (GPS IIF-8) | Navigation satellite | MEO | Success | 50th Atlas V launch |
| 51 | December 13, 2014; 03:19 | 541 | AV-051 | Vandenberg, SLC-3E | USA-259 (NROL-35) | NRO reconnaissance satellite | Molniya | Success | First use of the RL-10C engine on the Centaur stage |
| 52 | January 21, 2015; 01:04 | 551 | AV-052 | Cape Canaveral, SLC-41 | MUOS-3 | Military comsat | GTO | Success | |
| 53 | March 13, 2015; 02:44 | 421 | AV-053 | Cape Canaveral, SLC-41 | MMS | Magnetosphere research satellites | HEO | Success | |
| 54 | May 20, 2015; 15:05 | 501 | AV-054 | Cape Canaveral, SLC-41 | USA-261 (X-37B OTV-4/AFSPC-5) | Military orbital test vehicle | LEO | Success | |
| 55 | July 15, 2015; 15:36 | 401 | AV-055 | Cape Canaveral, SLC-41 | USA-262 (GPS IIF-10) | Navigation satellite | MEO | Success | |
| 56 | September 2, 2015; 10:18 | 551 | AV-056 | Cape Canaveral, SLC-41 | MUOS-4 | Military comsat | GTO | Success | |
| 57 | October 2, 2015; 10:28 | 421 | AV-059 | Cape Canaveral, SLC-41 | Morelos-3 | Comsat | GTO | Success | |
| 58 | October 8, 2015; 12:49 | 401 | AV-058 | Vandenberg, SLC-3E | USA-264 (NROL-55) | NRO reconnaissance satellites | LEO | Success | |
| 59 | October 31, 2015; 16:13 | 401 | AV-060 | Cape Canaveral, SLC-41 | USA-265 (GPS IIF-11) | Navigation satellite | MEO | Success | |
| 60 | December 6, 2015; 21:44 | 401 | AV-061 | Cape Canaveral, SLC-41 | Cygnus CRS OA-4 | ISS logistics spacecraft | LEO | Success | First Atlas rocket used to directly support the ISS program |
| 61 | February 5, 2016; 13:38 | 401 | AV-057 | Cape Canaveral, SLC-41 | USA-266 (GPS IIF-12) | Navigation satellite | MEO | Success | |
| 62 | March 23, 2016; 03:05 | 401 | AV-064 | Cape Canaveral, SLC-41 | Cygnus CRS OA-6 | ISS logistics spacecraft | LEO | Success | First stage shut down early but did not affect mission outcome |
| 63 | June 24, 2016; 14:30 | 551 | AV-063 | Cape Canaveral, SLC-41 | MUOS-5 | Military comsat | GTO | Success | |
| 64 | July 28, 2016; 12:37 | 421 | AV-065 | Cape Canaveral, SLC-41 | USA-267 (NROL-61) | NRO reconnaissance satellite | GTO | Success | |
| 65 | September 8, 2016; 23:05 | 411 | AV-067 | Cape Canaveral, SLC-41 | OSIRIS-REx | Asteroid sample return | Heliocentric | Success | |
| 66 | November 11, 2016; 18:30 | 401 | AV-062 | Vandenberg, SLC-3E | WorldView-4 (GeoEye-2) + 7 NRO cubesats | Earth Imaging, cubesats | SSO | Success | LMCLS launch |
| 67 | November 19, 2016; 23:42 | 541 | AV-069 | Cape Canaveral, SLC-41 | GOES-R (GOES-16) | Meteorology | GTO | Success | 100th EELV launch |
| 68 | December 18, 2016; 19:13 | 431 | AV-071 | Cape Canaveral, SLC-41 | EchoStar 19 (Jupiter 2) | Commercial comsat | GTO | Success | LMCLS launch Last flight of the 431 configuration |
| 69 | January 21, 2017; 00:42 | 401 | AV-066 | Cape Canaveral, SLC-41 | USA-273 (SBIRS GEO-3) | Missile Warning satellite | GTO | Success | |
| 70 | March 1, 2017; 17:49 | 401 | AV-068 | Vandenberg, SLC-3E | USA-274 (NROL-79) | NRO Reconnaissance Satellite | LEO | Success | |
| 71 | April 18, 2017; 15:11 | 401 | AV-070 | Cape Canaveral, SLC-41 | Cygnus CRS OA-7 | ISS logistics spacecraft | LEO | Success | |
| 72 | August 18, 2017; 12:29 | 401 | AV-074 | Cape Canaveral, SLC-41 | TDRS-M (TDRS-13) | Data relay satellite | GTO | Success | |
| 73 | September 24, 2017; 05:49 | 541 | AV-072 | Vandenberg, SLC-3E | USA-278 (NROL-42) | NRO Reconnaissance Satellite | Molniya | Success | |
| 74 | October 15, 2017; 07:28 | 421 | AV-075 | Cape Canaveral, SLC-41 | USA-279 (NROL-52) | NRO Reconnaissance satellite | GTO | Success | |
| 75 | January 20, 2018; 00:48 | 411 | AV-076 | Cape Canaveral, SLC-41 | USA-282 (SBIRS GEO-4) | Missile Warning satellite | GTO | Success | |
| 76 | March 1, 2018; 22:02 | 541 | AV-077 | Cape Canaveral, SLC-41 | GOES-S (GOES-17) | Meteorology | GTO | Success | Expended the 100th AJ-60 SRB. The Centaur upper stage fragmented in orbit on September 6, 2024. |
| 77 | April 14, 2018; 23:13 | 551 | AV-079 | Cape Canaveral, SLC-41 | AFSPC-11 | Military comsat | GEO | Success | |
| 78 | May 5, 2018; 11:05 | 401 | AV-078 | Vandenberg, SLC-3E | InSight MarCO | Mars lander; 2 CubeSats | Hyperbolic (Mars landing) | Success | First interplanetary mission from Vandenberg; first interplanetary CubeSats. |
| 79 | October 17, 2018, 04:15 | 551 | AV-073 | Cape Canaveral, SLC-41 | USA-288 (AEHF-4) | Military comsat | GTO | Success | 250th Centaur. The Centaur upper stage fragmented in orbit on April 6, 2019. |
| 80 | August 8, 2019, 10:13 | 551 | AV-083 | Cape Canaveral, SLC-41 | USA-292 (AEHF-5) | Military comsat | GTO | Success | |
| 81 | December 20, 2019, 11:36 | N22 | AV-080 | Cape Canaveral, SLC-41 | Starliner Boeing OFT | Uncrewed orbital test flight | LEO (ISS) | Success | First flight of a Dual-Engine Centaur on Atlas V. First orbital test flight of Starliner. Planned to visit ISS, but an anomaly with the Starliner vehicle left the spacecraft in too low an orbit to do so. The Atlas V rocket performed as expected and thus the mission is listed as successful here. |
| 82 | February 10, 2020, 04:03 | 411 | AV-087 | Cape Canaveral, SLC-41 | Solar Orbiter | Solar heliophysics orbiter | Heliocentric | Success | Last Flight of the 411 configuration |
| 83 | March 26, 2020, 20:18 | 551 | AV-086 | Cape Canaveral, SLC-41 | USA-298 (AEHF-6) | Military comsat | GTO | Success | First ever flight for the U.S. Space Force. 500th flight of the RL10 engine |
| 84 | May 17, 2020, 13:14 | 501 | AV-081 | Cape Canaveral, SLC-41 | USA-299 (USSF-7 (X-37B OTV-6, Falcon-Sat-8)) | X-37 military spaceplane; USAFA sat. | LEO | Success | Sixth flight of X-37B; FalconSat-8 |
| 85 | July 30, 2020, 11:50 | 541 | AV-088 | Cape Canaveral, SLC-41 | Mars 2020 | Mars rover | Heliocentric | Success | Launch of the Perseverance rover |
| 86 | November 13, 2020, 22:32 | 531 | AV-090 | Cape Canaveral, SLC-41 | USA 310 (NROL-101) | NRO Reconnaissance Satellite | LEO | Success | First usage of new GEM 63 solid rocket boosters. |
| 87 | May 18, 2021, 17:37 | 421 | AV-091 | Cape Canaveral, SLC-41 | USA 315 (SBIRS-GEO 5) | Missile warning satellite | GTO | Success | First usage of RL-10C-1-1 upper stage engine. Mission was successful, but unexpected vibration was observed in the new engine. Further use of this engine variant is on hold pending better understanding. |
| 88 | September 27, 2021; 18:12 | 401 | AV-092 | Vandenberg, SLC-3E | Landsat 9 | Earth Observation satellite | LEO | Success | |
| 89 | October 16, 2021; 09:34 | 401 | AV-096 | Cape Canaveral, SLC-41 | Lucy | Space probe | Heliocentric | Success | |
| 90 | December 7, 2021; 10:19 | 551 | AV-093 | Cape Canaveral, SLC-41 | STP-3 | Technology demonstration | GEO | Success | Longest flight ever by an Atlas V Rocket |
| 91 | January 21, 2022; 19:00 | 511 | AV-084 | Cape Canaveral, SLC-41 | USSF-8 (GSSAP 5 & 6) | Space Surveillance | GEO | Success | First and only planned flight of the 511 configuration |
| 92 | March 1, 2022; 21:38 | 541 | AV-095 | Cape Canaveral, SLC-41 | GOES-T | Meteorology | GEO | Success | |
| 93 | May 19, 2022; 22:54 | N22 | AV-082 | Cape Canaveral, SLC-41 | Boe OFT-2 | Uncrewed orbital test flight | LEO (ISS) | Success | |
| 94 | July 1, 2022; 23:15 | 541 | AV-094 | Cape Canaveral, SLC-41 | USSF-12 (WFOV) | Early warning | GEO | Success | Last flight of the 541 configuration 100th flight of an RD-180 engine |
| 95 | August 4, 2022; 10:29 | 421 | AV-097 | Cape Canaveral, SLC-41 | USA-336 (SBIRS GEO-6) | Missile warning satellite | GEO | Success | Last flight of the 421 configuration |
| 96 | 4 October 2022 21:36 | 531 | AV-099 | Cape Canaveral, SLC-41 | SES-20 & SES-21 | Communication Satellites | GEO | Success | Last flight of the 531 configuration |
| 97 | 10 November 2022 09:49 | 401 | AV-098 | Vandenberg, SLC-3E | JPSS-2 / LOFTID | Environmental Satellites | SSO | Success | Last flight of the 401 configuration and last Atlas V launch from VSFB. Final flight of an Atlas V with a 4-meter fairing. 100th use of Single Engine Centaur. |
| 98 | 10 September 2023 12:47 | 551 | AV-102 | Cape Canaveral, SLC-41 | USA-346; USA-347; USA-348 (NROL-107) | NRO domain awareness satellites | GEO | Success | Final NRO launch on an Atlas V. |
| 99 | 6 October 2023 18:06 | 501 | AV-104 | Cape Canaveral, SLC-41 | KuiperSat-1 & KuiperSat-2 | Experimental Internet Satellites | LEO | Success | Project Kuiper Protoflight mission carrying two demonstrator satellites. Last flight of the 501 configuration. |
| 100 | 5 June 2024 14:52 | N22 | AV-085 | Cape Canaveral, SLC-41 | Boe-CFT | Crewed orbital test flight | LEO (ISS) | Success | The first crewed launch of an Atlas V rocket with Sunita Williams and Barry E. Wilmore onboard. |
| 101 | July 30, 2024, 10:45 | 551 | AV-101 | Cape Canaveral, SLC-41 | USA-396; USA-397; USA-398 (USSF-51) | Unknown | GEO | Success | First launch for ULA under National Security Space Launch program. Launch vehicle transferred from Vulcan Centaur to Atlas V. |
| 102 | April 28, 2025, 23:01 | 551 | AV-107 | Cape Canaveral, SLC-41 | KuiperSat × 27 (KA‑01) | Internet Satellites | LEO | Success | Launch of 27 satellites for internet constellation. |
| 103 | June 23, 2025, 10:54 | 551 | AV-105 | Cape Canaveral, SLC-41 | KuiperSat × 27 (KA‑02) | Internet Satellites | LEO | Success | Launch of 27 satellites for internet constellation. |
| 104 | September 25, 2025, 12:09 | 551 | AV-108 | Cape Canaveral, SLC-41 | KuiperSat × 27 (KA‑03) | Internet Satellites | LEO | Success | Launch of 27 satellites for internet constellation. |
| 105 | November 14, 2025, 03:04 | 551 | AV-100 | Cape Canaveral, SLC-41 | ViaSat-3 Flight 2 | Communications Satellite | GTO | Success | Last launch of geostationary communication satellite on Atlas V. |
| 106 | December 16, 2025, 08:28 | 551 | AV-111 | Cape Canaveral, SLC-41 | LeoSat × 27 (LA‑04) | Internet Satellites | LEO | Success | Launch of 27 satellites for internet constellation. |
| 107 | April 4, 2026, 05:46 | 551 | AV-109 | Cape Canaveral, SLC-41 | LeoSat × 29 (LA‑05) | Internet Satellites | LEO | Success | Launch of 29 satellites for internet constellation. Heaviest payload so far. |
| 108 | April 28, 2026, 00:53 | 551 | AV-112 | Cape Canaveral, SLC-41 | LeoSat × 29 (LA‑06) | Internet Satellites | LEO | Success | Launch of 29 satellites for internet constellation. |
| 109 | May 29, 2026, 23:53 | 551 | AV-113 | Cape Canaveral, SLC-41 | LeoSat × 29 (LA‑07) | Internet Satellites | LEO | Success | Launch of 29 satellites for internet constellation. |
| 110 | 2 July 2026; 04:30 | 551 | AV-114 | Cape Canaveral, SLC-41 | LeoSat × 29 (LA‑08) | Internet Satellites | LEO | Success | Final flight of Atlas V in the 551 configuration. Final flight of an Atlas V with a 5-meter fairing, last use of Single Engine Centaur III upper stage, and last use of GEM-63 strap-on solid rocket boosters on Atlas V. Last of nine Amazon Leo launches on Atlas V. |

ULA has stopped selling the Atlas V. As of July 2026, six rockets remain, all of which are slated to launch Starliner missions.

For planned launches, see List of Atlas launches (2020–2029).

=== Notable missions ===
The first payload, the Hot Bird 6 communications satellite, was launched to geostationary transfer orbit (GTO) on August 21, 2002, by an Atlas V 401.

On August 12, 2005, the Mars Reconnaissance Orbiter was launched aboard an Atlas V 401 launch vehicle from Space Launch Complex 41 at Cape Canaveral Air Force Station (CCAFS). The Centaur upper stage of the launch vehicle completed its burns over a 56-minute period and placed MRO into an interplanetary transfer orbit towards Mars.

On January 19, 2006, New Horizons was launched by a Lockheed Martin Atlas V 551 rocket. A third stage was added to increase the heliocentric (escape) speed. This was the first launch of the Atlas V 551 configuration with five solid rocket boosters, and the first Atlas V with a third stage.

On December 6, 2015, Atlas V launched the first Cygnus resupply craft, its heaviest mission at that time and the first Atlas V launch going to the ISS.

On September 8, 2016, the OSIRIS-REx Asteroid Sample Return Mission was launched on an Atlas V 411 launch vehicle. It arrived at the asteroid Bennu in December 2018 and departed back to Earth in May 2021 to arrive September 2022 at with a sample ranging from 60 grams to 2 kilograms in 2023.

Five Boeing X-37B spaceplane missions were successfully launched with the Atlas V. The flights are launched on Atlas V 501s from Cape Canaveral Space Force Station in Florida. The X-37B, also known as the Orbital Test Vehicle (OTV), is a reusable robotic spacecraft operated by USAF that can autonomously conduct landings from orbit to a runway. The first Vandenberg Air Force Base landing at the Space Shuttle 15,000 ft (4,600 m) runway occurred in December 2010. Landings occur at both Vandenberg and Cape Canaveral depending on mission requirements.

On December 20, 2019, the first Starliner crew capsule was launched in Boe-OFT un-crewed test flight. The Atlas V launch vehicle performed flawlessly but an anomaly with the spacecraft left it in a wrong orbit. The orbit was too low to reach the flight's destination of ISS, and the mission was subsequently cut short.

=== Mission success record ===
In its 100 launches (as of June 2024), starting with its first launch in August 2002, Atlas V has achieved a 100% mission success rate and a 99% vehicle success rate.

The first anomalous event in the use of the Atlas V launch system occurred on June 15, 2007, when the engine in the Centaur upper stage of an Atlas V shut down early, leaving its payload – a pair of NROL-30 ocean surveillance satellites – in a lower than intended orbit. The cause of the anomaly was traced to a leaky valve, which allowed fuel to leak during the coast between the first and second burns. The resulting lack of fuel caused the second burn to terminate 4 seconds early. Replacing the valve led to a delay in the next Atlas V launch. However, the customer (the National Reconnaissance Office) categorized the mission as a success.

A flight on March 23, 2016, suffered an underperformance anomaly on the first-stage burn and shut down 5 seconds early. The Centaur proceeded to boost the Orbital Cygnus payload, the heaviest on an Atlas to date, into the intended orbit by using its fuel reserves to make up for the shortfall from the first stage. This longer burn cut short a later Centaur disposal burn. An investigation of the incident revealed that this anomaly was due to a fault in the main engine mixture-ratio supply valve, which restricted the flow of fuel to the engine. The investigation and subsequent examination of the valves on upcoming missions led to a delay of the next several launches.

=== Notable payloads ===
- Boeing Starliner
- Boeing X-37
- ELaNa
- Geostationary Operational Environmental Satellite
- GPS
- Inmarsat
- InSight
- Juno
- Landsat
- Lucy
- Lunar Reconnaissance Orbiter
- Lunar Crater Observation and Sensing Satellite
- Mars Reconnaissance Orbiter
- Curiosity
- Perseverance and Ingenuity
- MAVEN
- MUOS-1 (200th Centaur upper stage launch)
- New Horizons
- NROL launches
- OSIRIS-REx
- Solar Dynamics Observatory
- Solar Orbiter
- Space Test Program
- USA-212

== Replacement with Vulcan ==
In 2014, geopolitical and U.S. political considerations because of the Russian annexation of Crimea led to an effort to replace the Russian-supplied NPO Energomash RD-180 engine used on the first-stage booster of the Atlas V. Formal study contracts were issued in June 2014 to a number of U.S. rocket-engine suppliers. The results of those studies led to a decision by ULA to develop the new Vulcan Centaur launch vehicle to replace the existing Atlas V and the Delta IV.

Although ULA intended to complete development of Vulcan by 2019, development took longer than expected and the first Vulcan launch was on January 8, 2024.

In September 2014, ULA announced a partnership with Blue Origin to develop the BE-4 LOX/methane engine to replace the RD-180 on a new first-stage booster. As the Atlas V core is designed around RP-1 fuel and cannot be retrofitted to use a methane-fueled engine, a new first stage was developed. This booster has the same first-stage tankage diameter as the Delta IV and is powered by two 2,400 kN (540,000 lb_{f}) thrust BE-4 engines.

Vulcan uses the Centaur V developed for it instead of the Centaur III used on Atlas V. It also uses two, four, or six optional solid rocket boosters, called the GEM 63XL, developed together with the shorter GEM 63 solid boosters used on Atlas V.

=== Retirement ===
In August 2021, ULA announced that they are no longer selling launches on the Atlas V and they would fulfill their 29 existing launch contracts. They made a final purchase of the RD-180 motors they needed and the last of those motors were delivered in April 2021. The last launch will occur "some time in the mid-2020s". As of July 2026, twenty three missions have flown since the announcement, (Note: the first mission after the announcement was mission 88. See table for the later launches.) and six launches remain, all N22 variants carrying the delayed Boeing Starliner capsule for NASA's Commercial Crew Program.

== Photo gallery ==
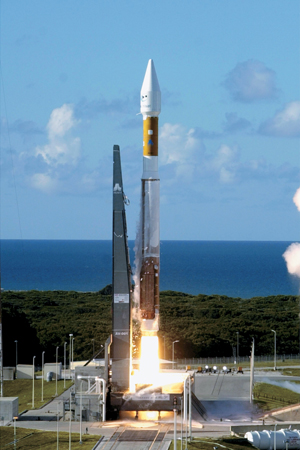
Maiden flight of Atlas V carrying Hot Bird 6 for Eutelsat

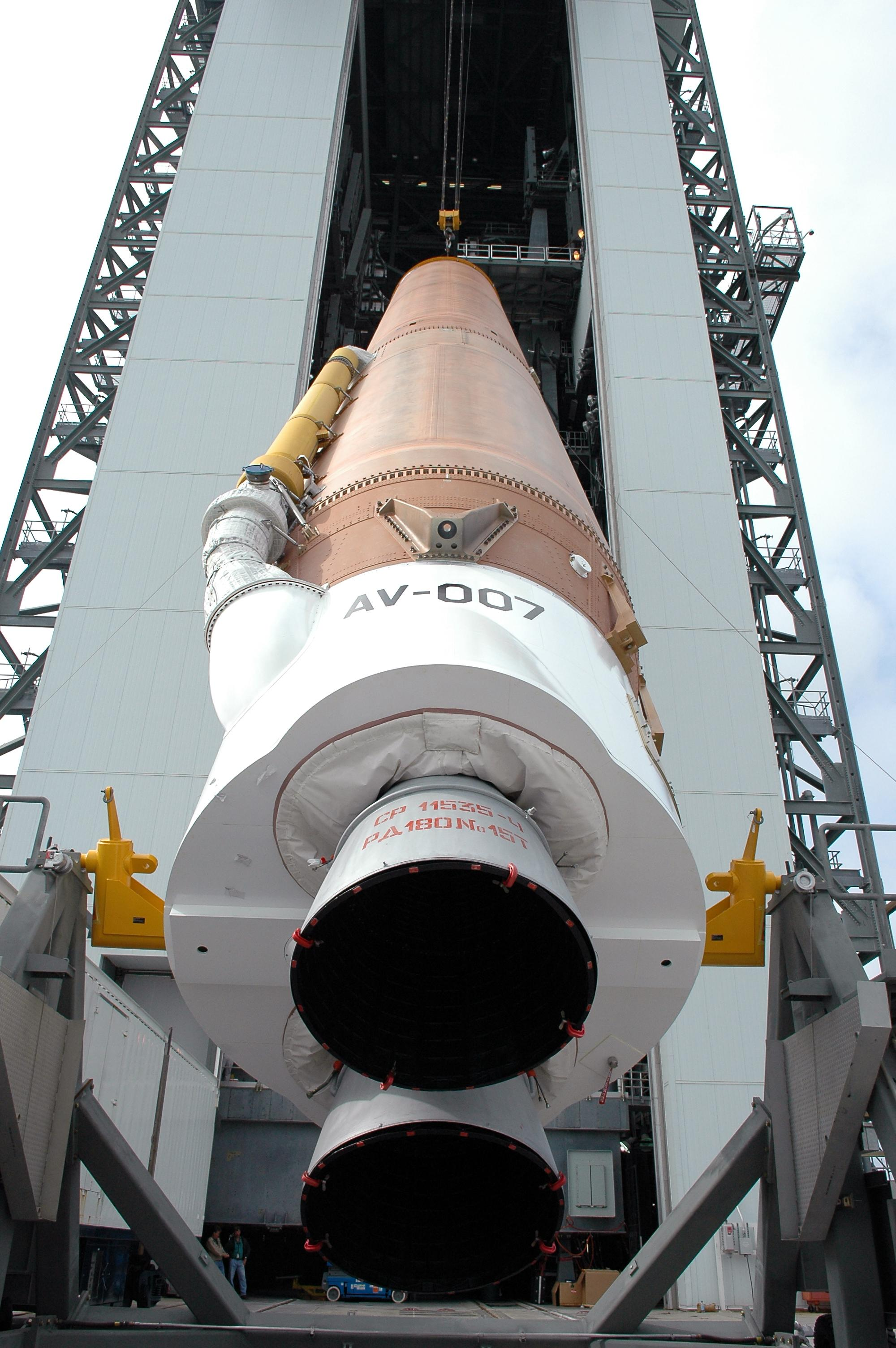
Core stage of an Atlas V being raised to a vertical position in preparation of launch of MRO

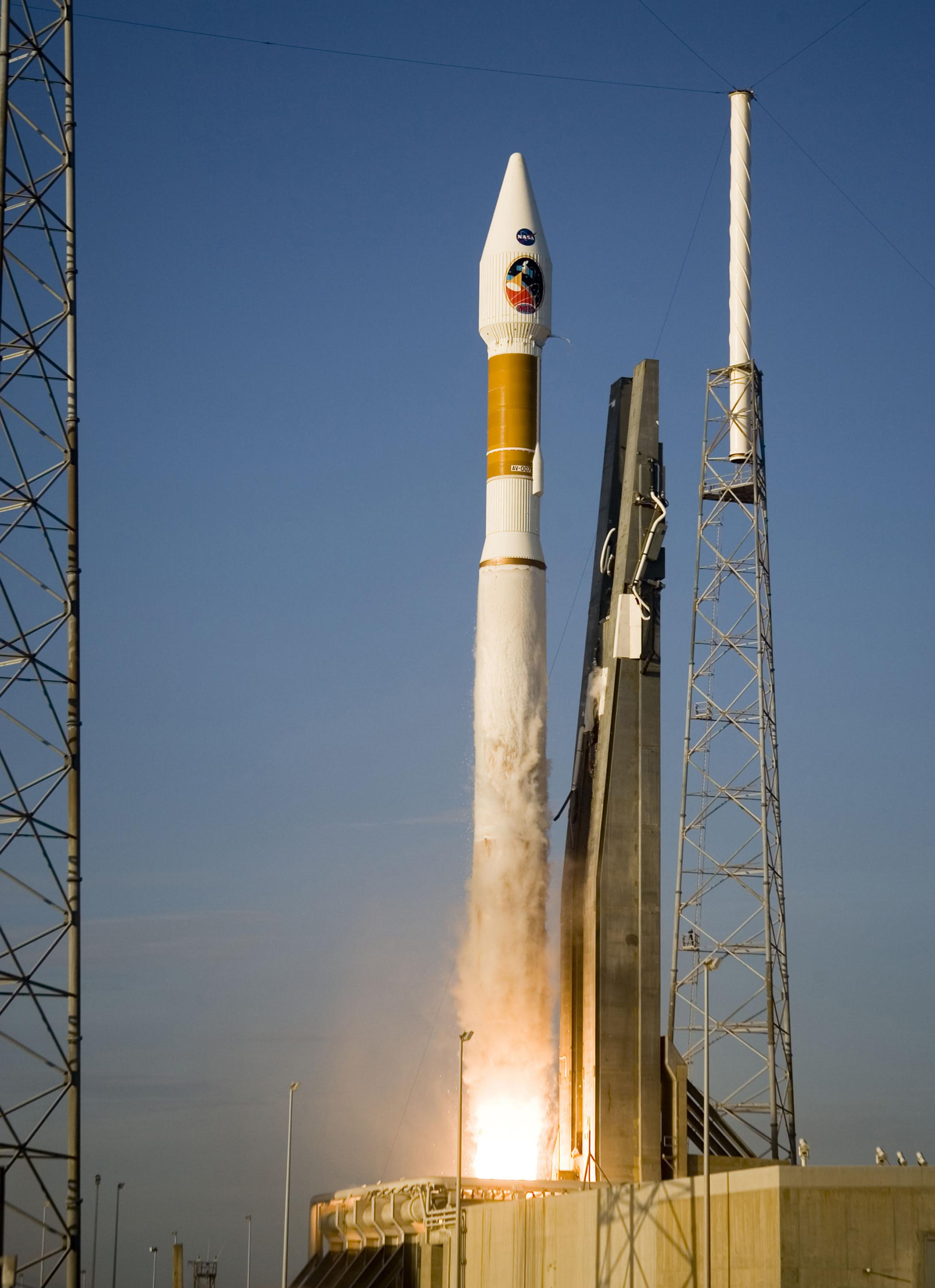
Launch of Mars Reconnaissance Orbiter

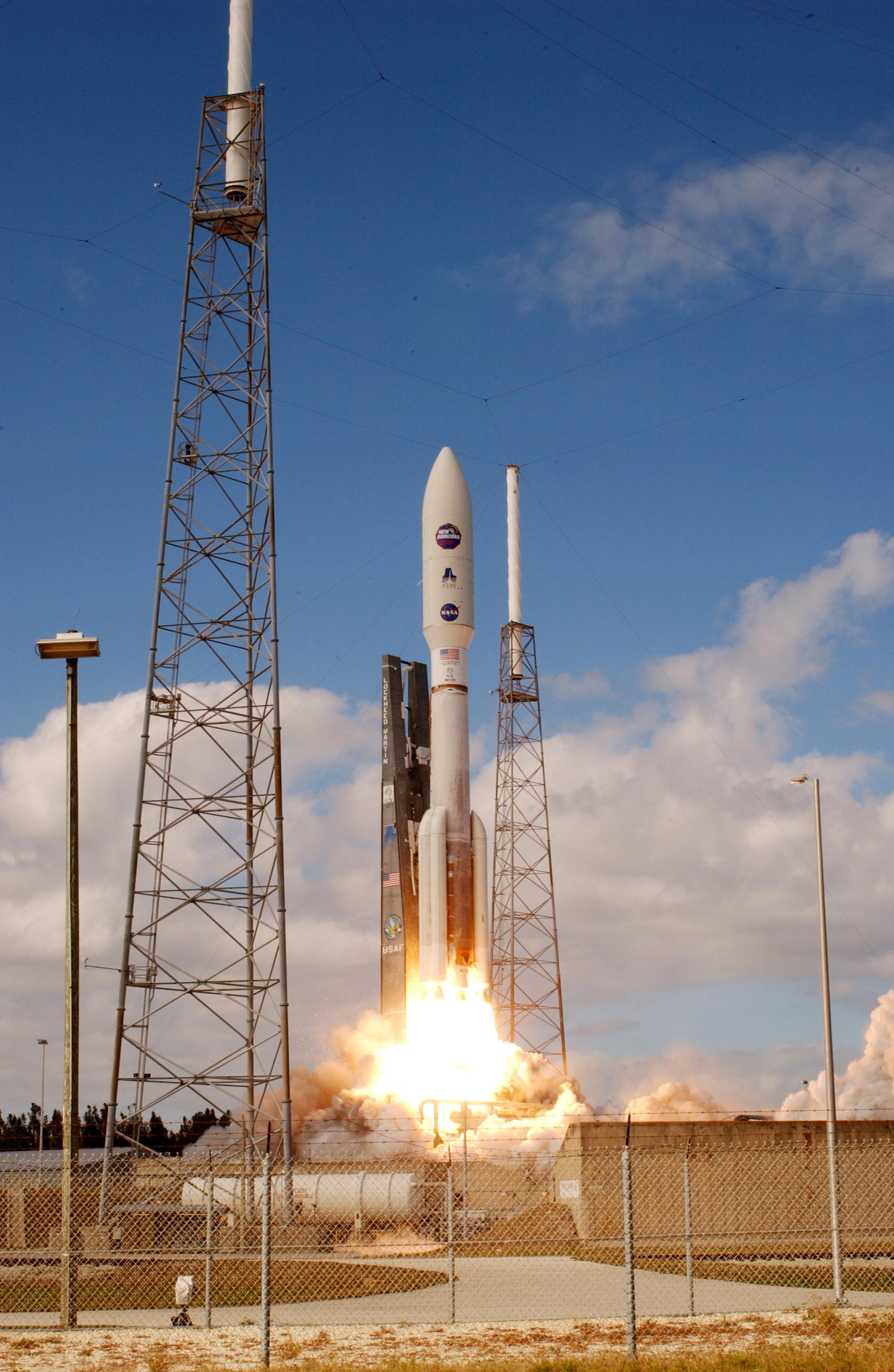
An Atlas V 551 with the New Horizons probe launches from Launch Pad 41 in Cape Canaveral.

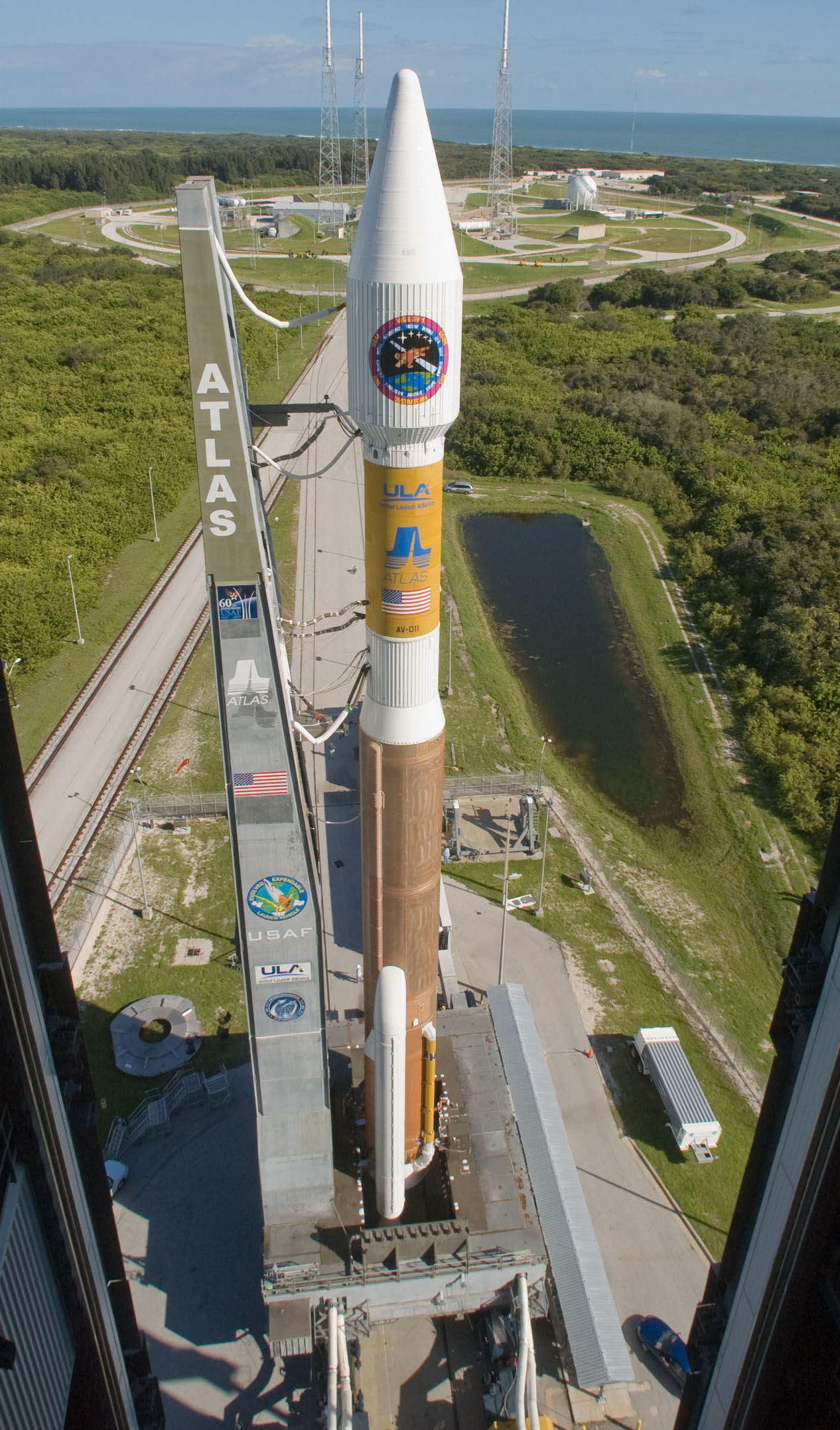
Atlas V rollout for WGS-1 Mission

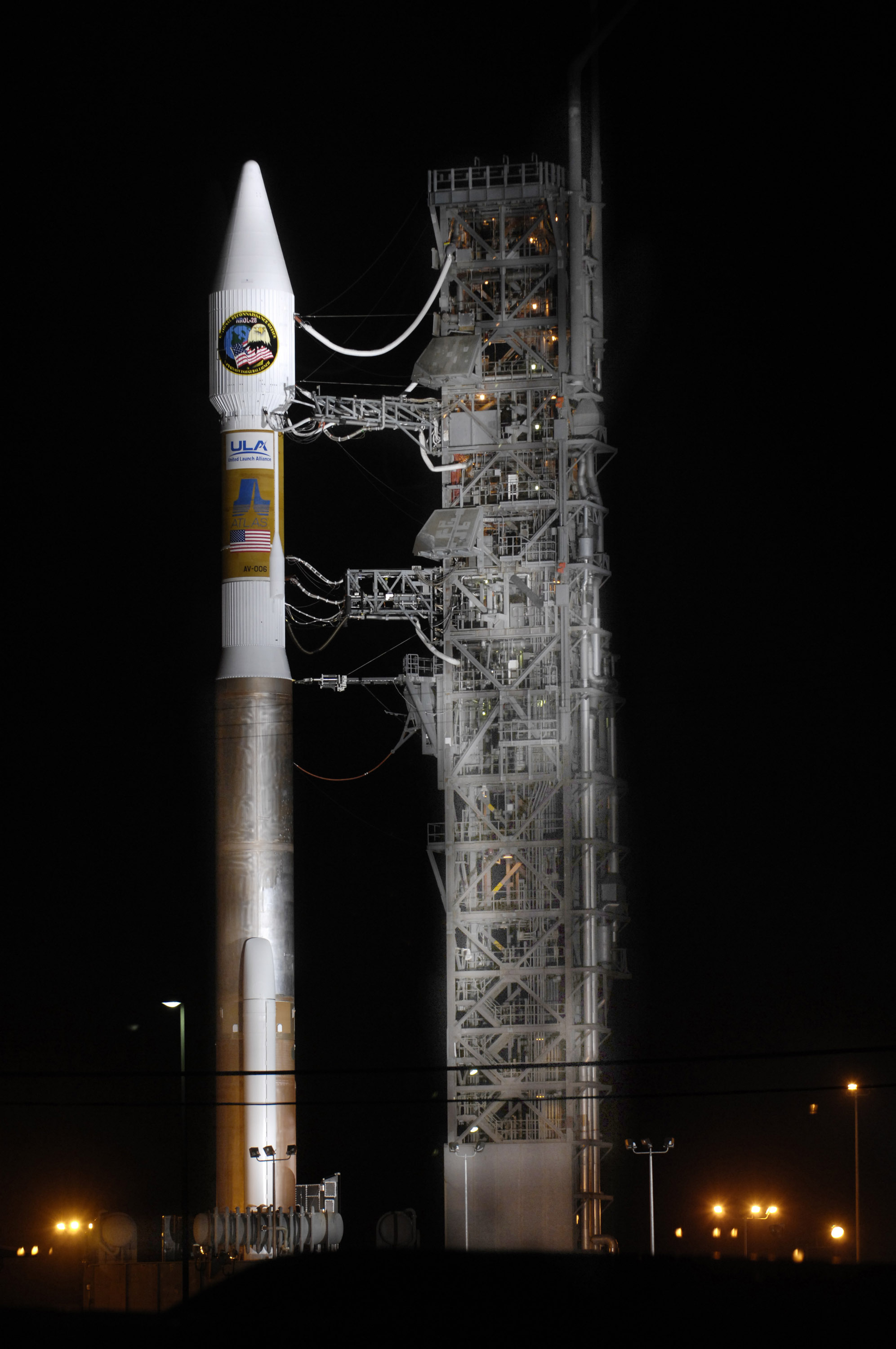
Atlas V at pad just before launch of NROL-28 Mission

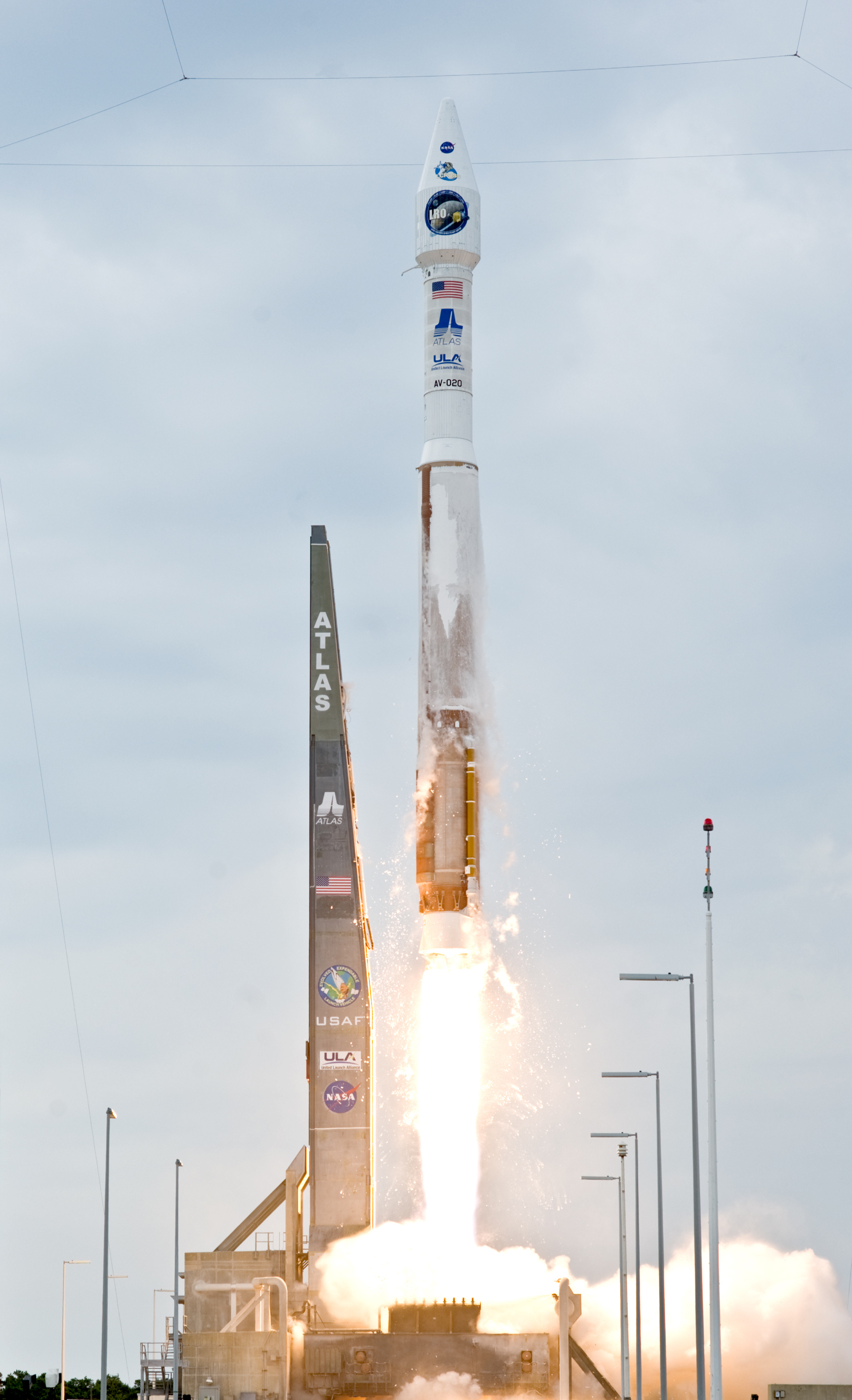
Launch of an Atlas V 401 carrying the Lunar Reconnaissance Orbiter and LCROSS space probes on June 18, 2009.

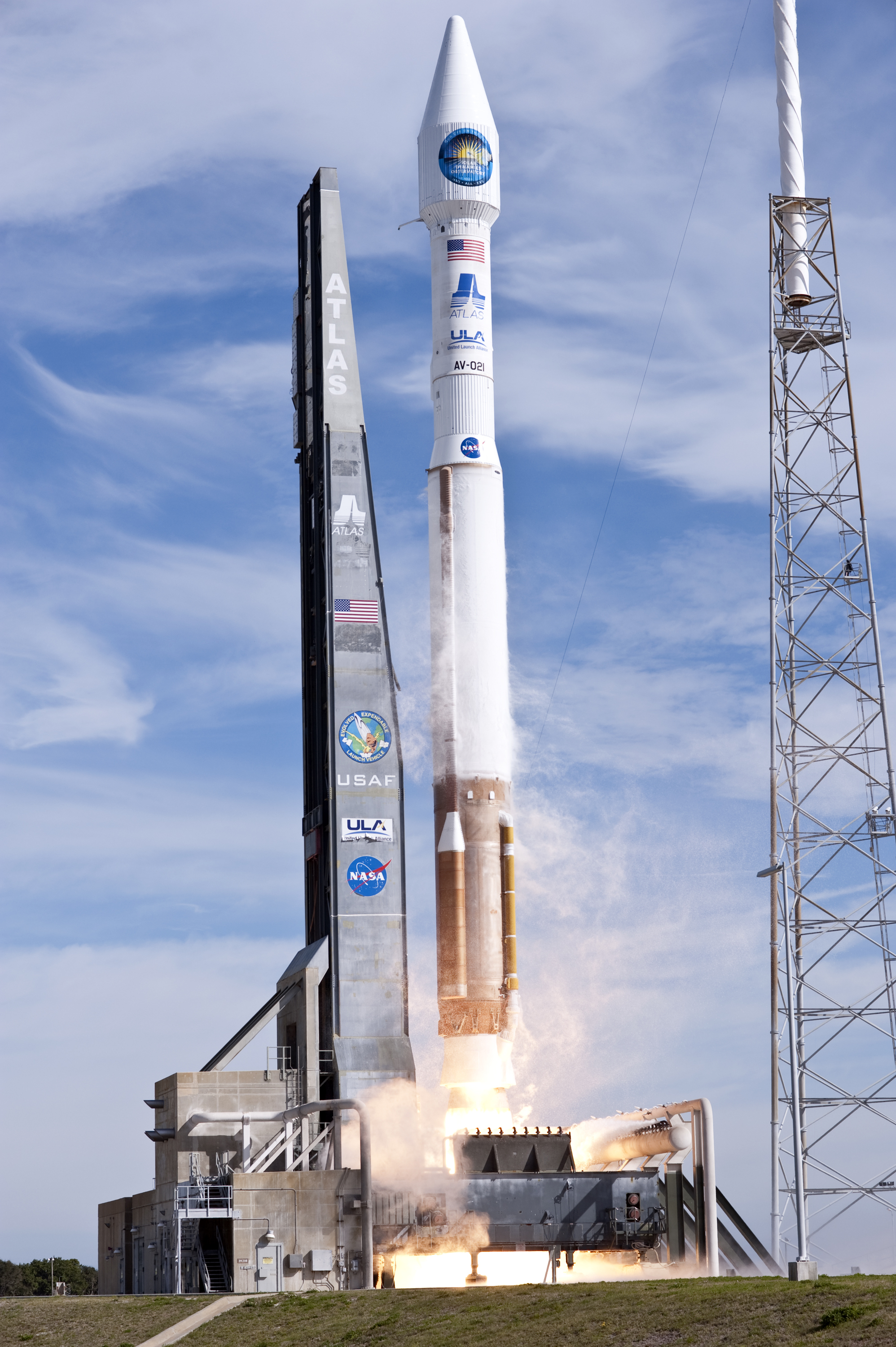
Launch of Solar Dynamics Observatory

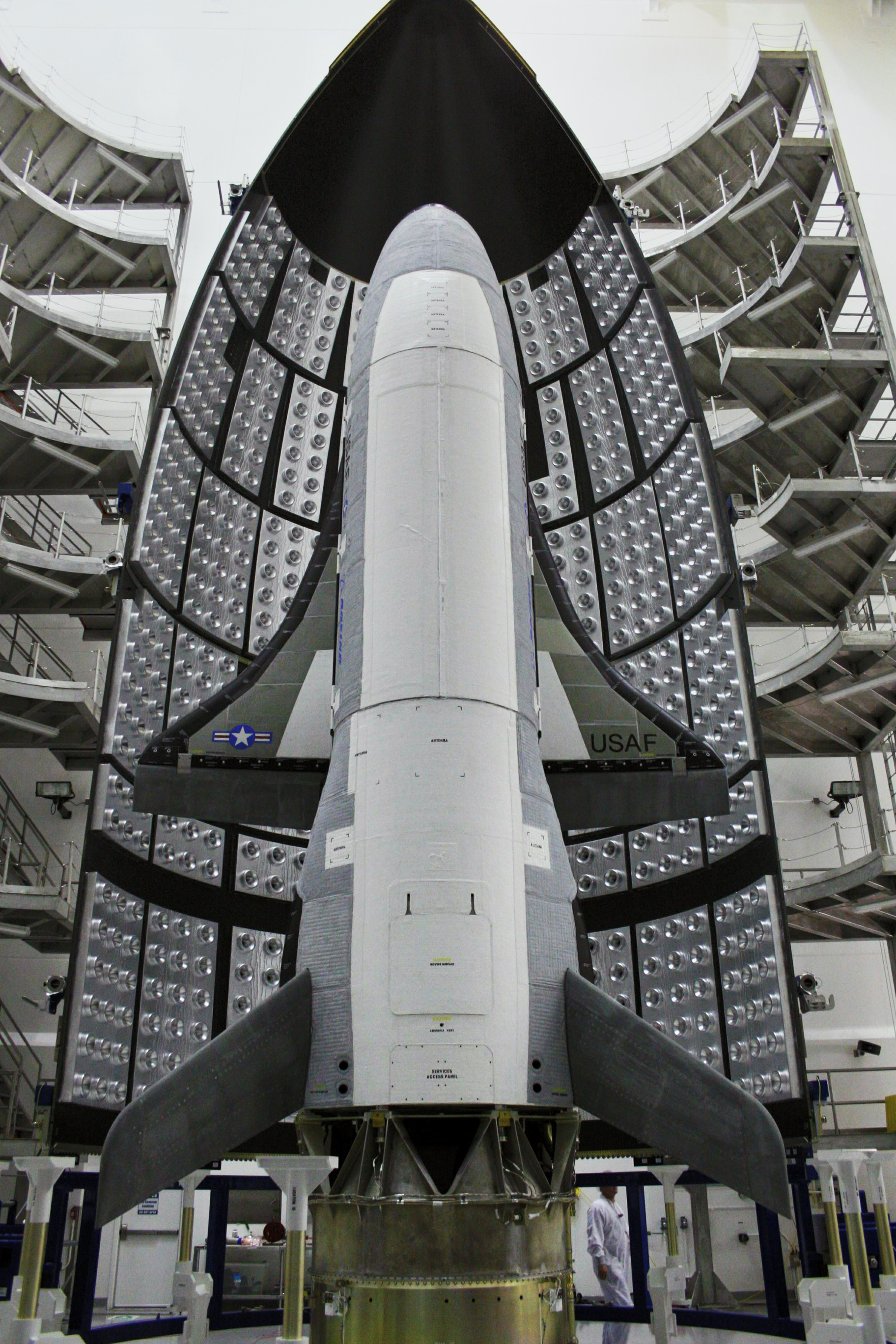
X-37B OTV-1 (Orbital Test Vehicle) being encased in its payload fairing for its 22 April 2010, launch.

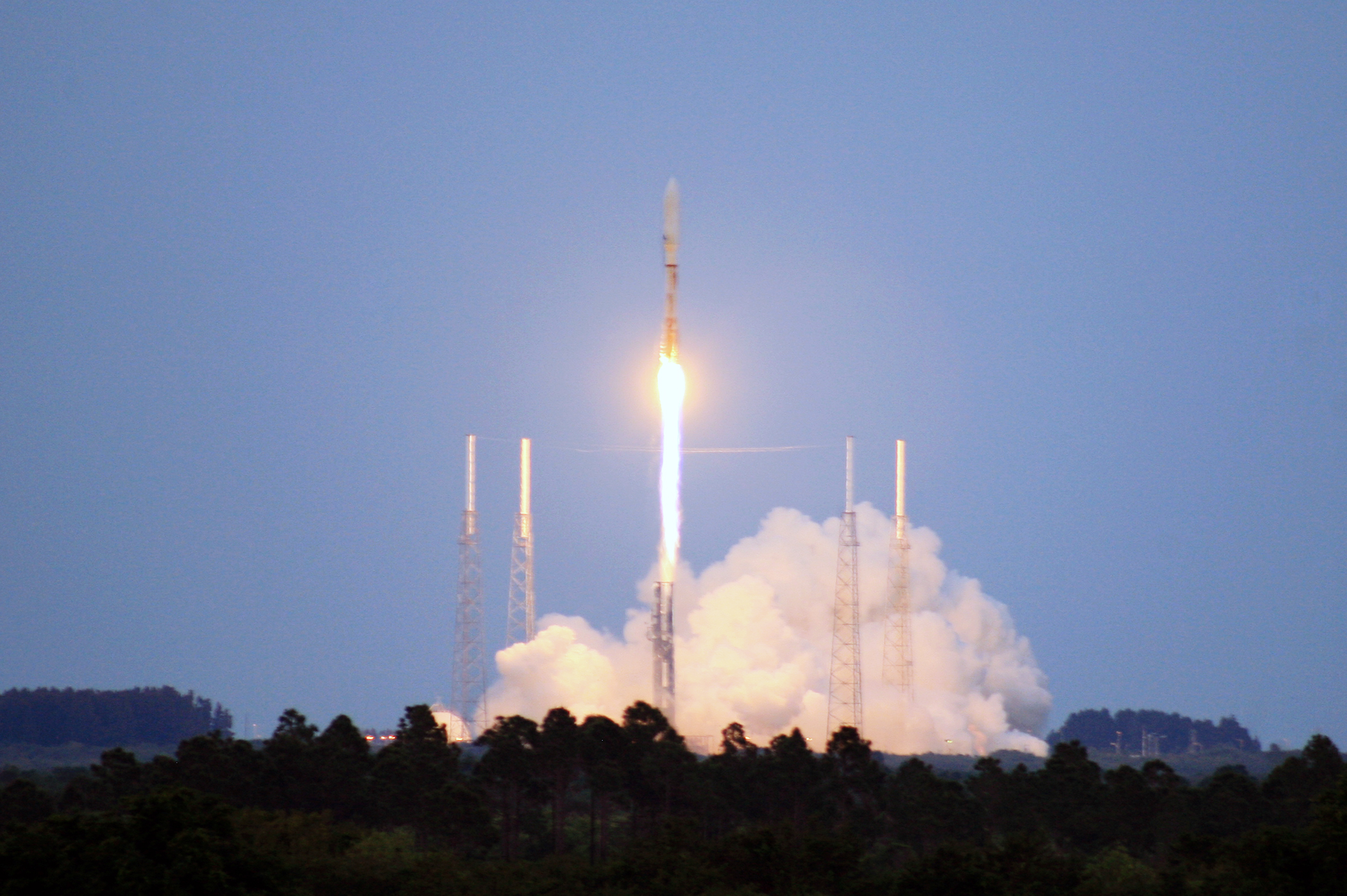
Launch of OTV-1

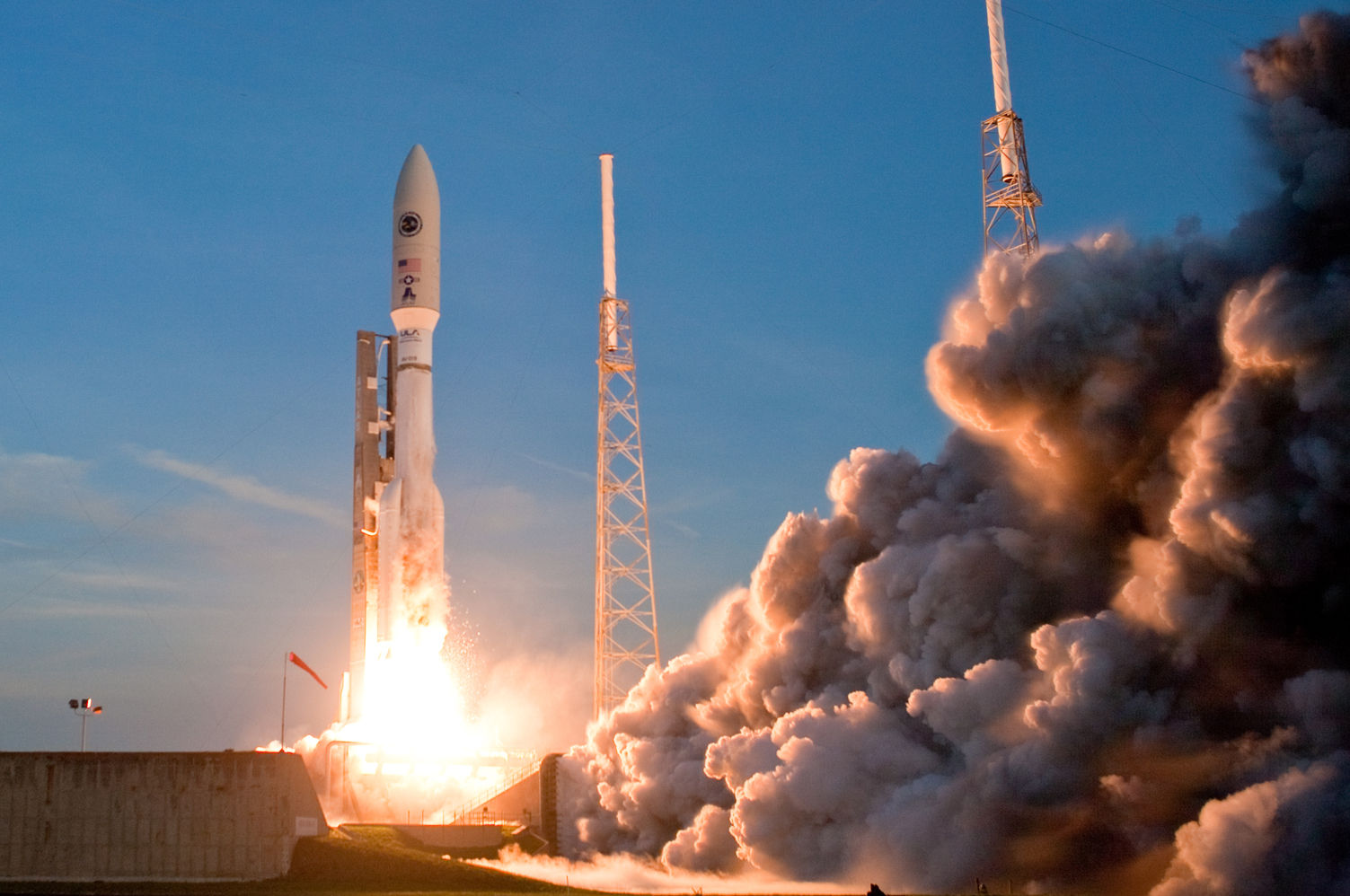
Launch of AEHF-1

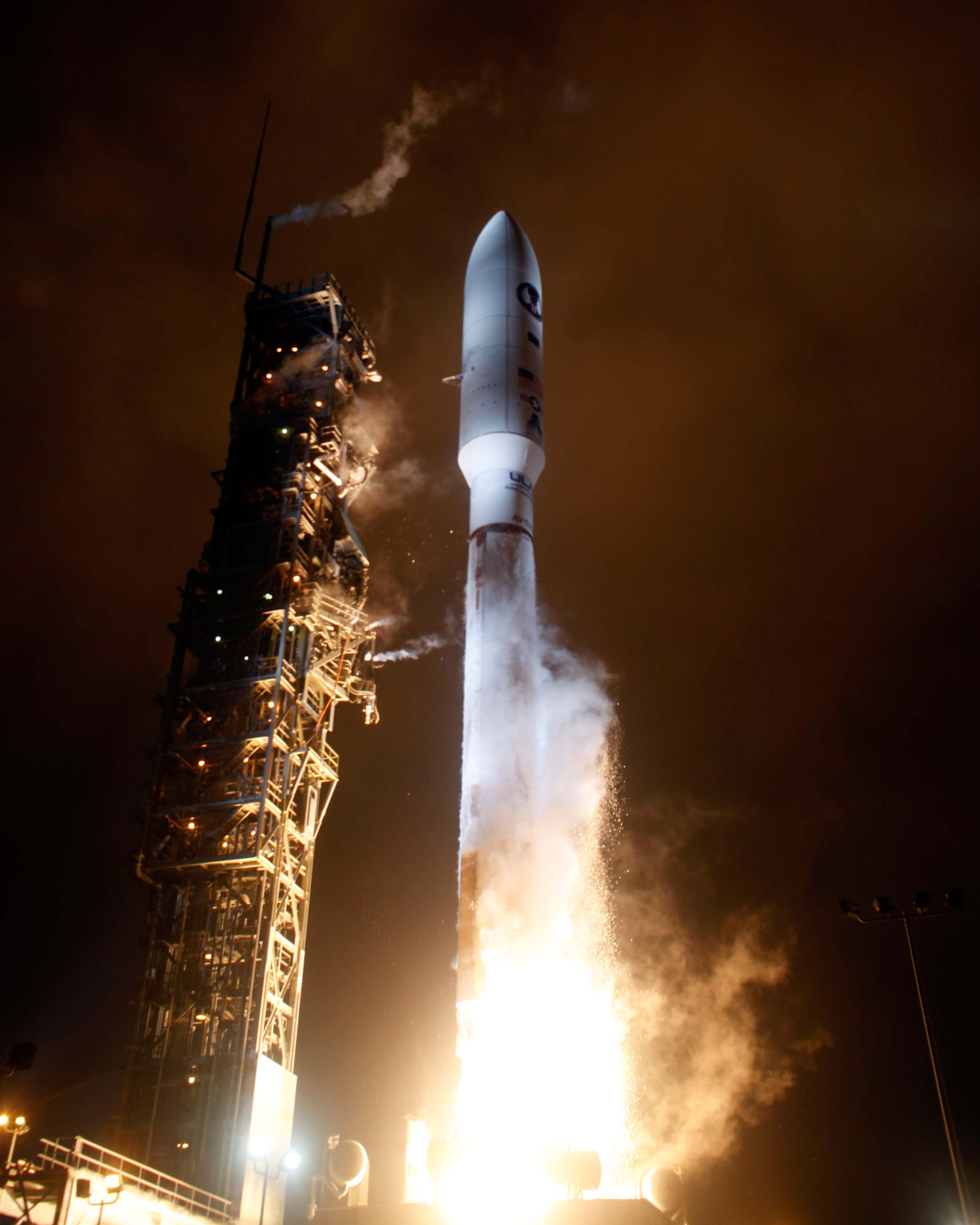
Launch of NROL-41

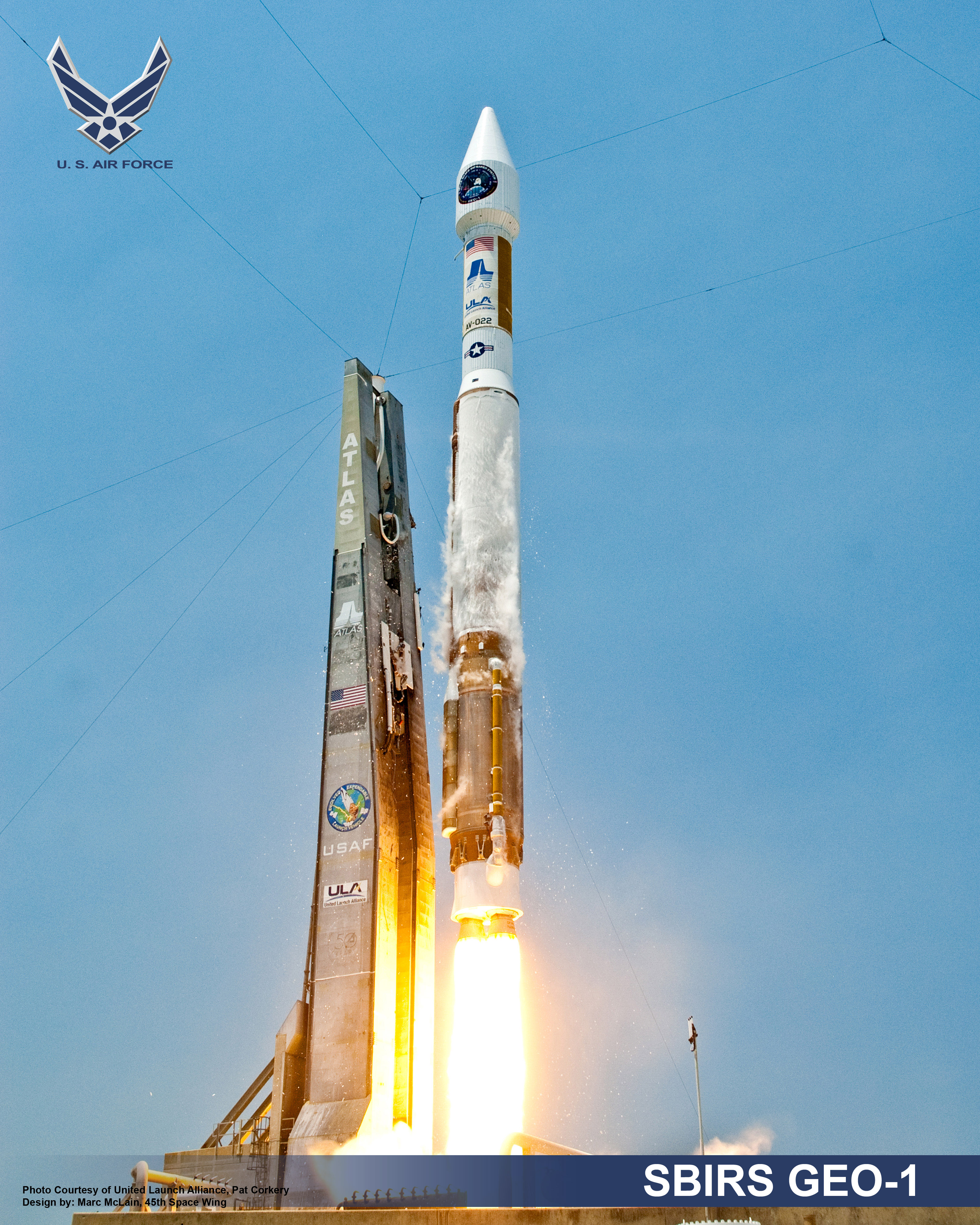
Launch of SBIRS GEO-1

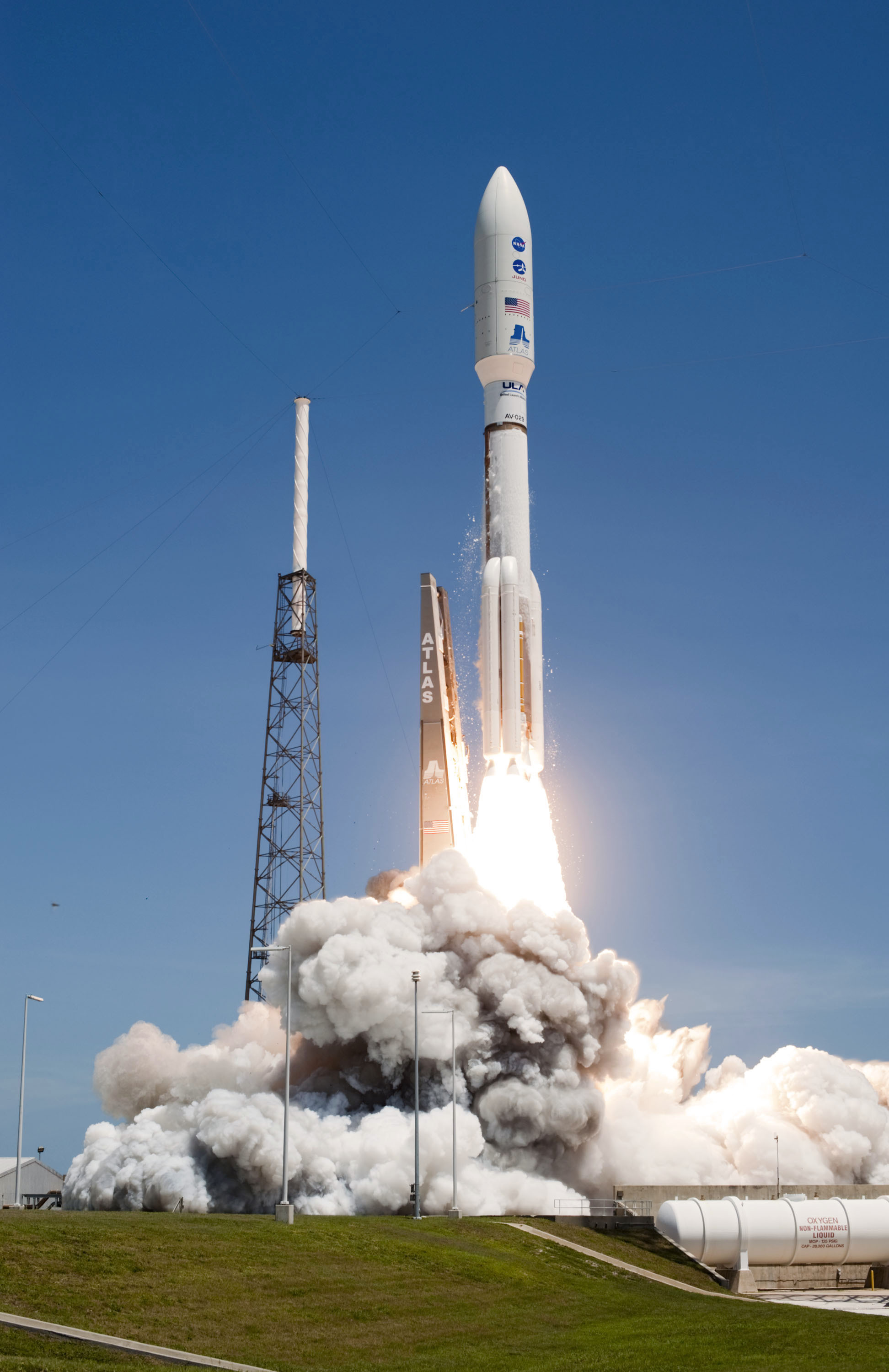
Launch of Juno

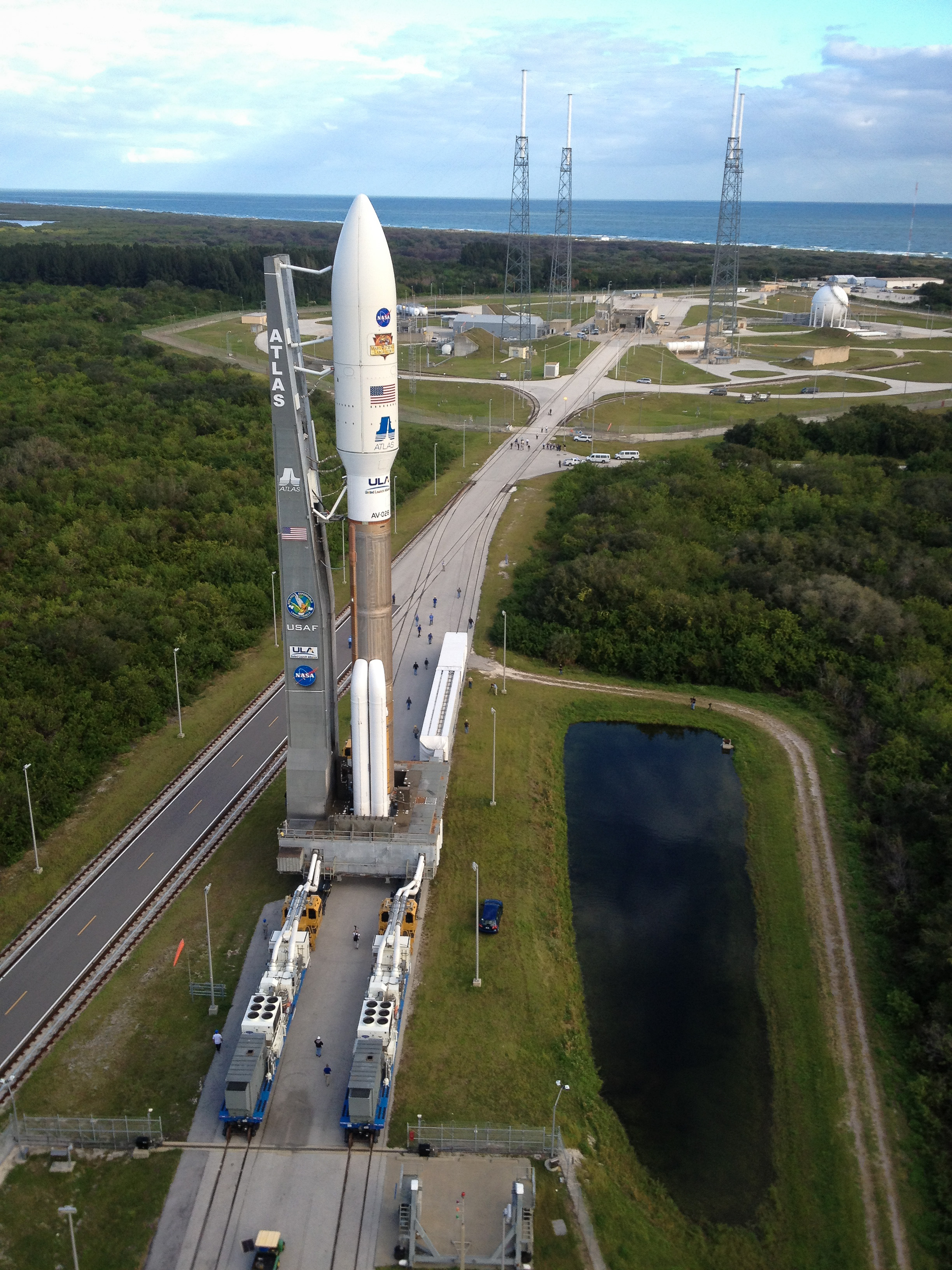
An Atlas V 541 is moved to the launch pad.

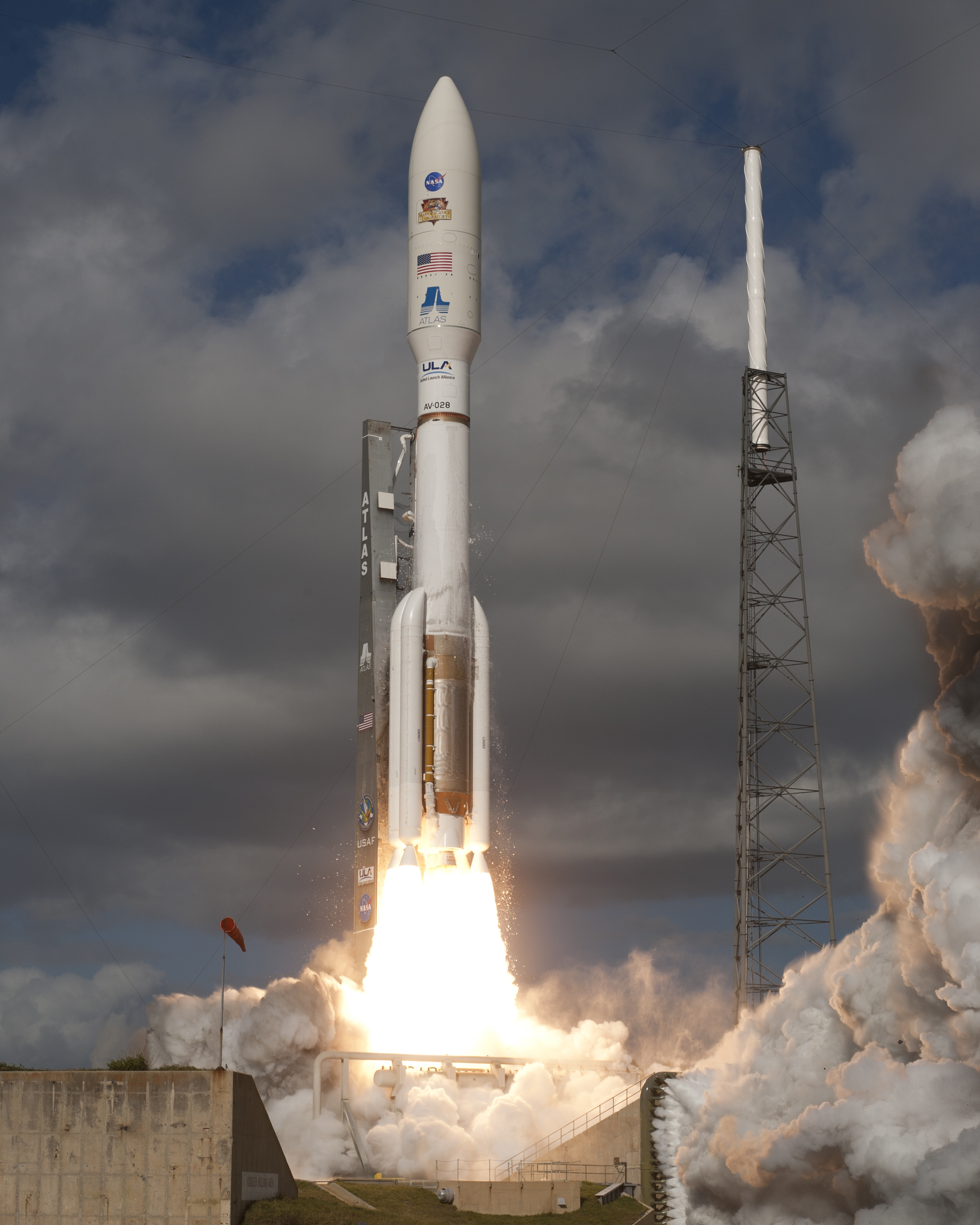
Launch of Mars Science Laboratory

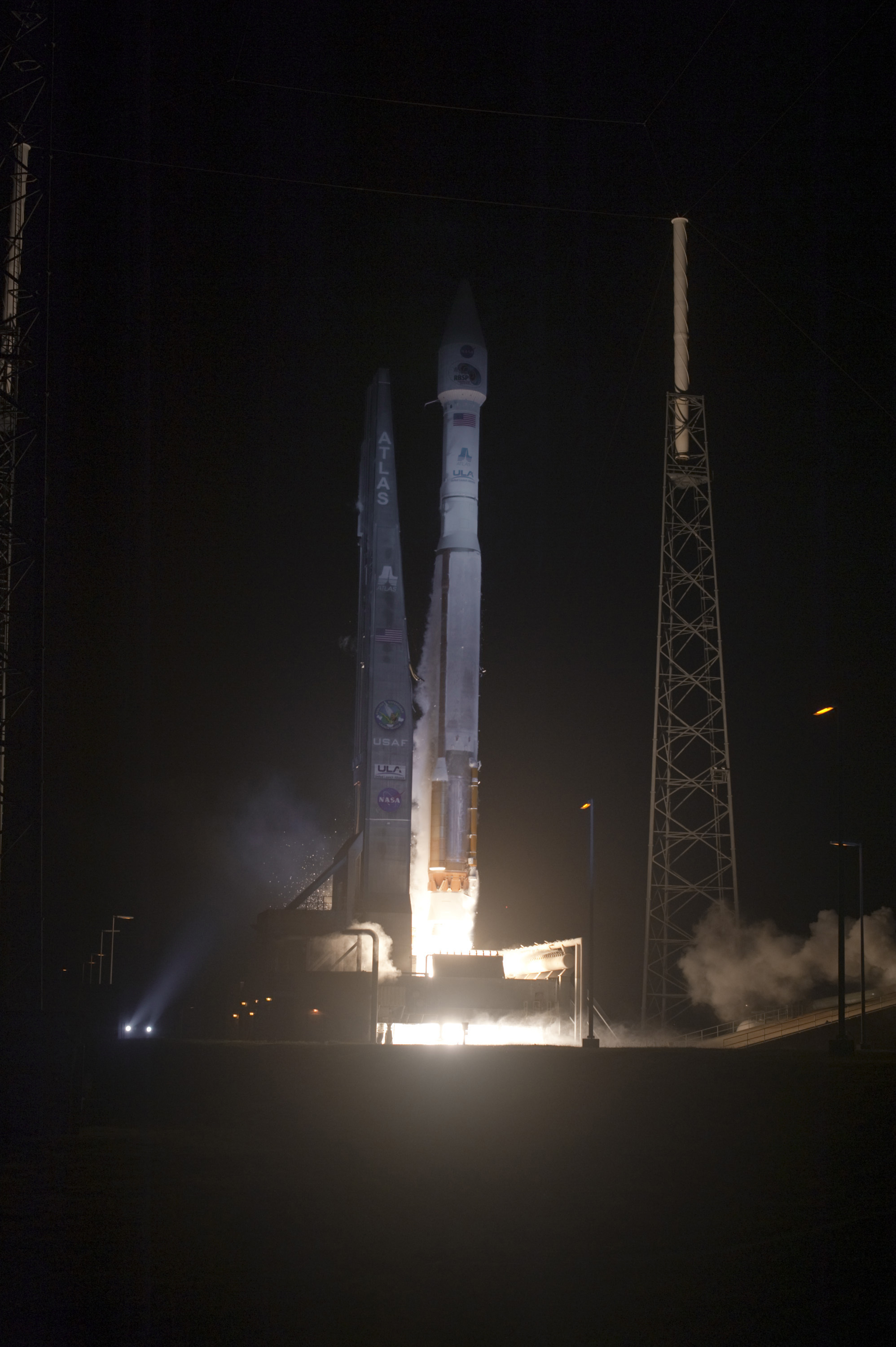
Launch of Van Allen Probes

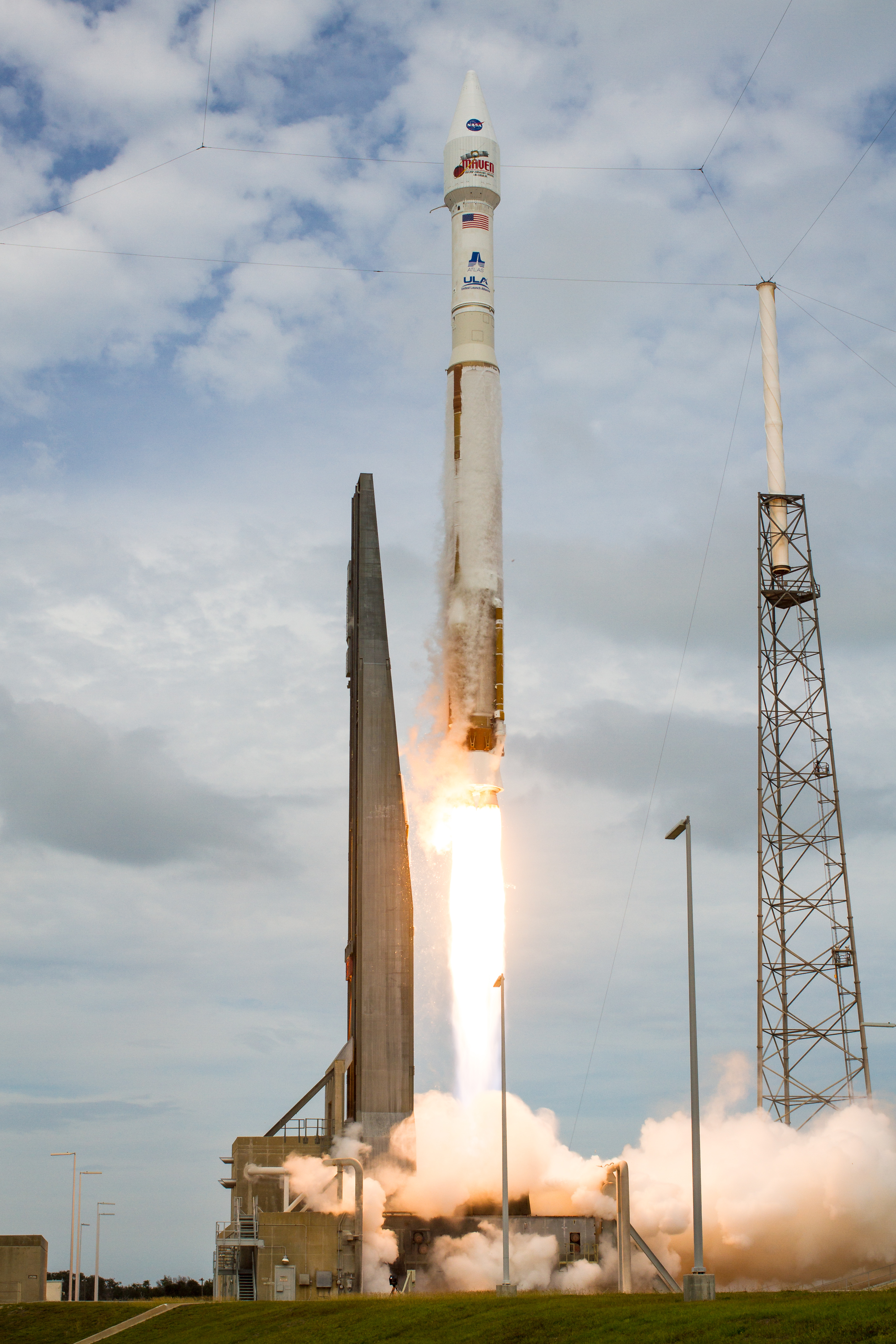
Launch of MAVEN

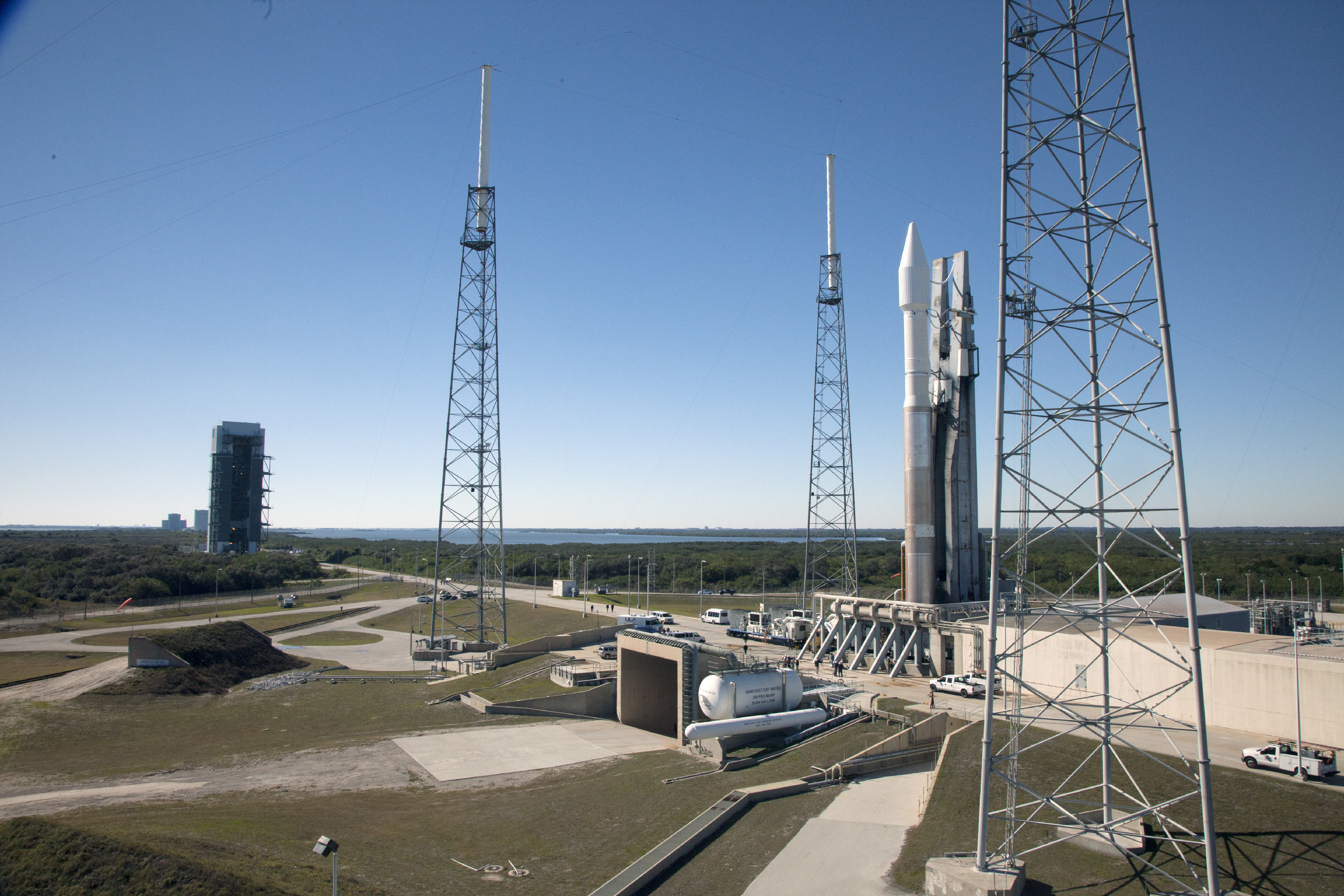
Atlas V 401 on launch pad

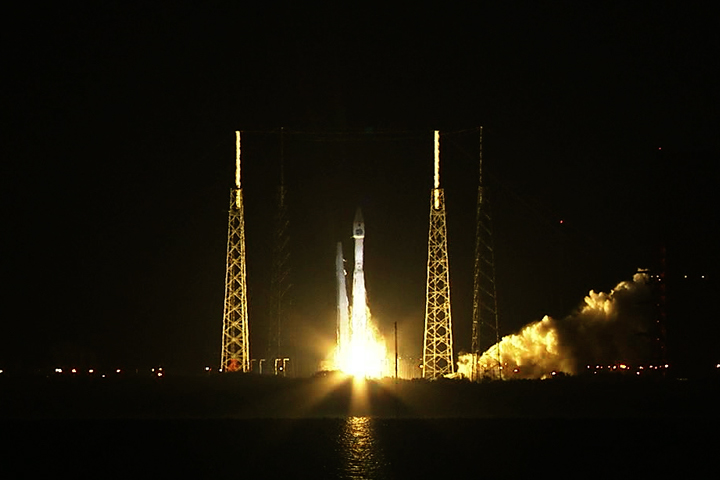
Atlas V ignition

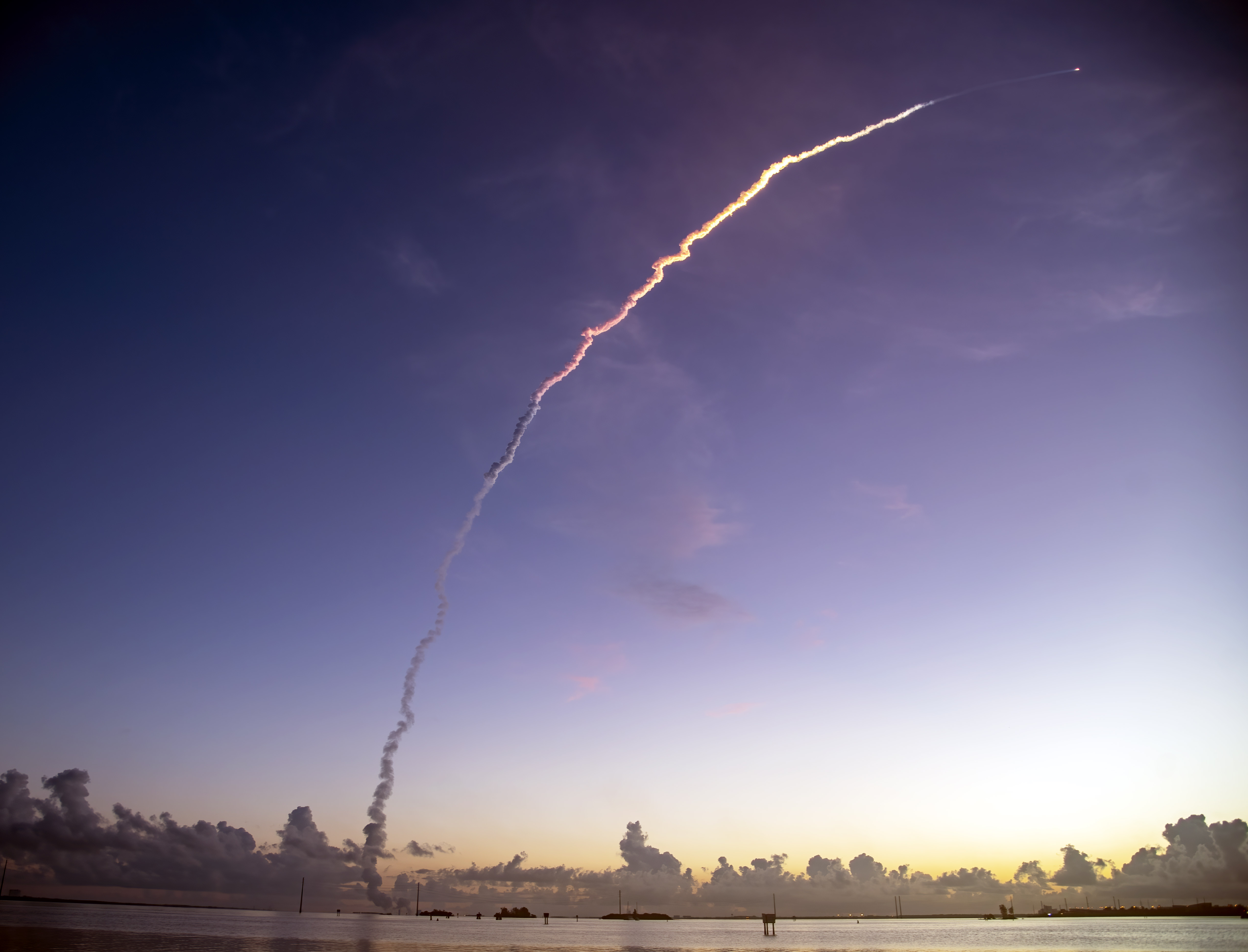
Vapor trail of an Atlas V 421 launch at Cape Canaveral in 2022

== See also ==
Comparable rockets:

- Angara
- Ariane 5
- Delta IV
- Falcon 9
- Falcon Heavy
- GSLV Mk III
- H-IIA
- H-IIB
- Long March 5
- Proton
- Vulcan Centaur
- Zenit
- Medium-lift launch vehicle
- Comparison of orbital launchers families
- Comparison of orbital launch systems
