= Eutelsat 8 West C =

Satellite

- Names: Hot Bird 6 (2002–2012); Hot Bird 13A (2012–2013); Eutelsat 8 West C (2013–2015); Eutelsat 33D (2015–2016); Eutelsat 70D (2016)
- Mission type: Communications
- Operator: Eutelsat
- COSPAR ID: 2002-038A
- SATCAT no.: 27499
- Website: https://www.eutelsat.com/en/home.html
- Mission duration: 23 years, 7 months and 22 days (in orbit)

Spacecraft properties
- Spacecraft: Hot Bird 6
- Spacecraft type: Spacebus
- Bus: Spacebus-3000B3
- Manufacturer: Alcatel Space
- Launch mass: 3,905 kg (8,609 lb)
- Dry mass: 1,900 kg (4,200 lb)

Start of mission
- Launch date: 21 August 2002, 22:05:00 UTC
- Rocket: Atlas V 401 (AV-001)
- Launch site: Cape Canaveral, SLC-41
- Contractor: Lockheed Martin
- Entered service: October 2002

End of mission
- Disposal: Graveyard orbit
- Deactivated: 2016

Orbital parameters
- Reference system: Geocentric orbit
- Regime: Geostationary orbit
- Longitude: 13° East (2002–2013); 8° West (2013–2015); 33° West (2015–2016); 70° East (2016)

Transponders
- Band: 32 transponders: 28 Ku-band; 4 Ka-band
- Coverage area: Europe, Africa, Middle East

Eutelsat 8 West C, known as Hot Bird 6 prior to 2012 and Hot Bird 13A from 2012 to 2013, is a geostationary communications satellite. Operated by Eutelsat, it provides direct-to-home (DTH) broadcasting services from geostationary orbit. The satellite was part of Eutelsat's Hot Bird constellation at a longitude of 13° East, until it was relocated to 8° West between July 2013 and August 2013.

== Satellite description ==
Hot Bird 6 was constructed by Alcatel Space based on the Spacebus-3000B3 satellite bus, Hot Bird 6 is a 3,905 kg (8,609 lb) satellite with a design life of 12 years. It is equipped with an S400-12 apogee motor which was used for initial orbit-raising manoeuvres and an S10-18 engine for station keeping burns. The spacecraft has 28 Ku-band and four Ka-band transponders.

== Launch ==
Hot Bird 6, as it was then named, was launched on the maiden flight of the Atlas V launch vehicle, tail number AV-001, flying in the 401 configuration from SLC-41 at the Cape Canaveral Air Force Station (CCAFS). Liftoff occurred at 22:05:00 UTC on 21 August 2002, with the launch vehicle successfully injecting its payload into geosynchronous transfer orbit (GTO). The launch was conducted by International Launch Services (ILS).

== Mission ==
Following launch, the satellite Hot Bird 6 used its apogee motor to raise itself into geostationary orbit, positioning itself at a longitude of 13° East. In March 2012, it was renamed Hot Bird 13A by Eutelsat. It operated at this position for almost eleven years before being removed from the slot in July 2013. In August 2013, it arrived at 8° West, where it has entered service as Eutelsat 8 West C, to support the Eutelsat 8 West A satellite until the planned 2015 launch of the Eutelsat 8 West B satellite. It provides coverage of the Middle East, North Africa and eastern Europe. It was then moved in 2015 to 33° East and renamed Eutelsat 33D. Later it was renamed Eutelsat 70D when it moved to 70° East. The satellite was retired in 2016 and was moved into a graveyard orbit above the geostationary belt.
