= BT-4 (rocket engine) =

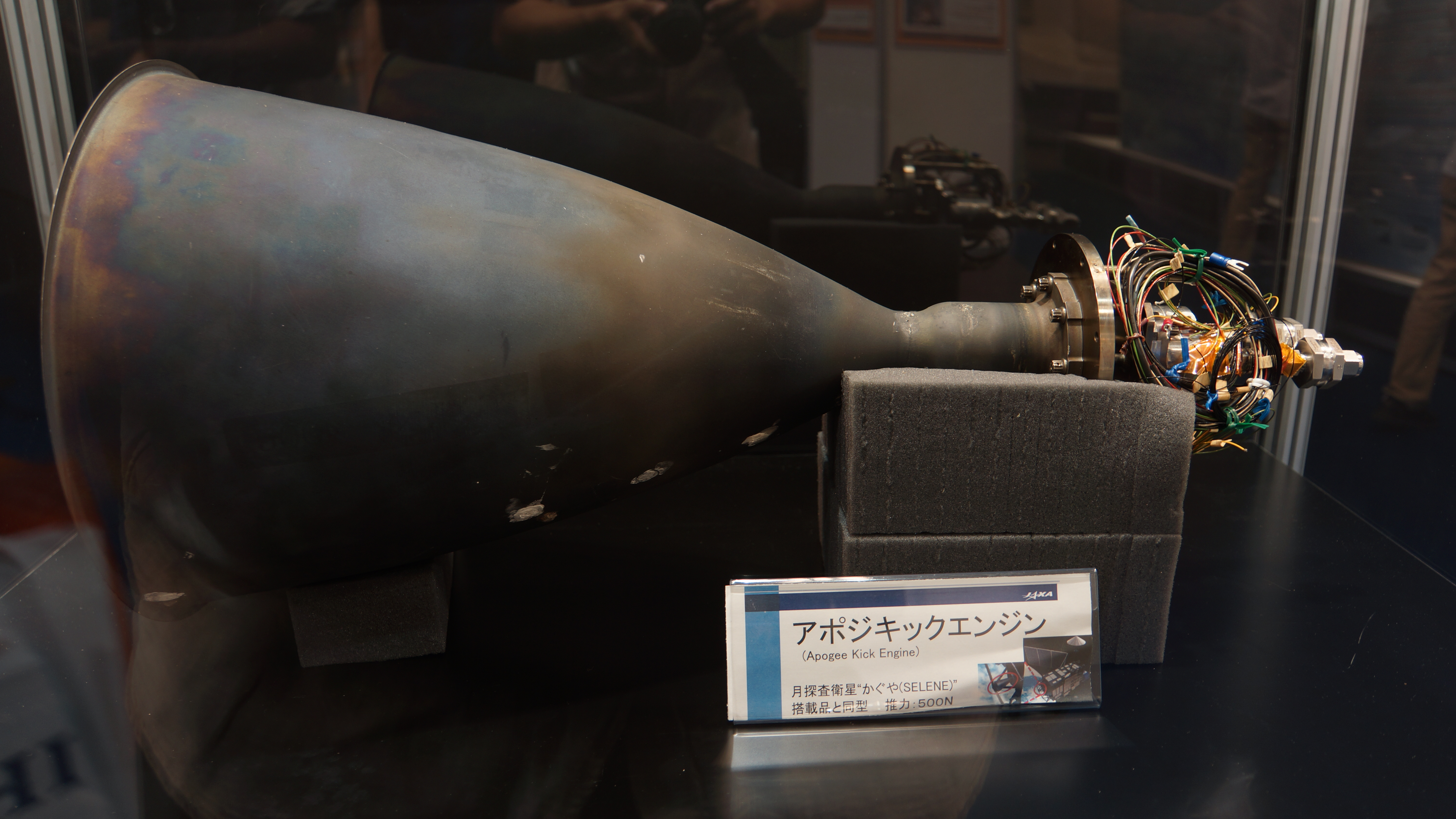
- Orbital Maneuvering Engine of the SELENE lunar orbiter
- Country of origin: Japan
- Designer: IHI Aerospace
- Associated LV: HTV, Cygnus
- Status: In production

Liquid-fuel engine
- Propellant: N_{2}O_{4} / Hydrazine
- Cycle: Pressure fed

Configuration
- Chamber: 1

Performance
- Thrust, vacuum: 500 N (110 lb_{f})

Dimensions
- Length: 80 cm (31 in)
- Dry mass: 4 kg (8.8 lb)

The BT-4 is a pressure-fed liquid rocket engine designed and manufactured by IHI Aerospace of Japan. It was originally developed for the LUNAR-A project, but it has been used as a liquid apogee engine in some geostationary communications satellite based on the Lockheed Martin A2100 and GEOStar-2 satellite buses. It has also been used on the HTV and Cygnus automated cargo spacecraft.

== History ==
During the 1970s, Ishikawajima-Harima Heavy Industries had built under license the Rocketdyne MB-3 for the N-I rocket, for which it had also developed the second stage attitude control system. In the 1980s it also developed the thrusters for ETS-4 (Kiku-3), the first to be built in Japan. In 2000 it acquired and merged with the aerospace division of Nissan and became IHI Aerospace.

IHI Aerospace started developing the BT-4 for the later cancelled LUNAR-A mission to the moon. While the mission was cancelled, the thruster has seen success as a liquid apogee engine on the Lockheed Martin A2100 and Orbital ATK GEOStar-2 platforms. Two other Orbital ATK products that use the BT-4 due to their leverage of the GEOStar-2 platform are the Cygnus spacecraft and the Antares Bi-propellant Third Stage (BTS).

The use on the A2100 platform has allowed IHI to export the BT-4 even to American military programs such programs as the MUOS and AEHF.

On March 9, 2006, IHI Aerospace announced that the AEHF-2 BT-4 engine had successfully performed its mission, unlike AEHF-1's. On November 29, 2010, IHI Aerospace announced that it had received and order from Lockheed Martin of four BT-4 engines for AEHF-4, MUOS-4, MUOS-5 and Vinasat-2. With this order, it achieved its 100th-unit foreign engine export since it started selling abroad in 1999.

For the HTV project, IHI developed a new version, the HBT-5, which enabled them to replace the American R-4D from the third flight onward.

On October 3, 2013, with the successful berthing of the Cygnus Orb-D1 mission, IHI announced that the propulsion was based on their 500N Delta-Velocity Engines.

In January 2018, a BT-4 kick motor was used on the GovSat-1 geosynchronous commsat flight.

== Versions ==
The BT-4 is a family that has been used as liquid apogee engine, orbital maneuvering engine and as a thruster. Known variations:

- BT-4 (Cygnus): Used mainly as thruster, it burns MMH/N_{2}O_{4} with a thrust of 450 N (100 lb_{f}). It weighs 4 kg (8.8 lb) and is 65 cm (26 in) tall.
- BT-4 (450N): Used mainly as LAE, it burns Hydrazine/N_{2}O_{4} in a 1.69 O/F ratio. It has a thrust of 450 N (100 lb_{f}), a specific impulse of 329 s (3.23 km/s) and an input pressure of 1.62 MPa (235 psi). As of 2014, it had a demonstrated life of 32,850 seconds.
- BT-4 (500N): Used mainly as LAE, it burns Hydrazine/N_{2}O_{4} with a thrust of 500 N (110 lb_{f}), a specific impulse of 329 s (3.23 km/s). It weighs 4 kg (8.8 lb) and is 80 cm (31 in) tall.
- 490N MON Thruster: Burns MMH/MON-3 with a 478 N (107 lb_{f}) nominal thrust, a specific impulse of 316 s (3.10 km/s) and an inlet pressure of 1.72 MPa (249 psi). As of 2014, it had a demonstrated life of 15,000 seconds.
- HBT-5: Developed for the HTV to crew-rated standards, it burns MMH/MON-3, and has a thrust of 500 N (110 lb_{f}). Used in HTV-3 and since HTV-5 onward. The specific impulse is 316s
- SELENE OME: Based on the DRTS Liquid apogee engine, the SELENE Orbital Maneuvering Engine burned a Hydrazine/MON-3 mixture. It had a thrust of 547 ± 54 N (123 ± 12 lb_{f}) and a specific impulse of 319.8 ± 5.1 s (3.136 ± 0.050 km/s) with an input pressure of 1.77 MPa (257 psi).
