= Chiesa dell'Addolorata, Niscemi =

Church in Caltanissetta, Sicily, Italy

Coordinates: 37.14526°N 14.38483°E

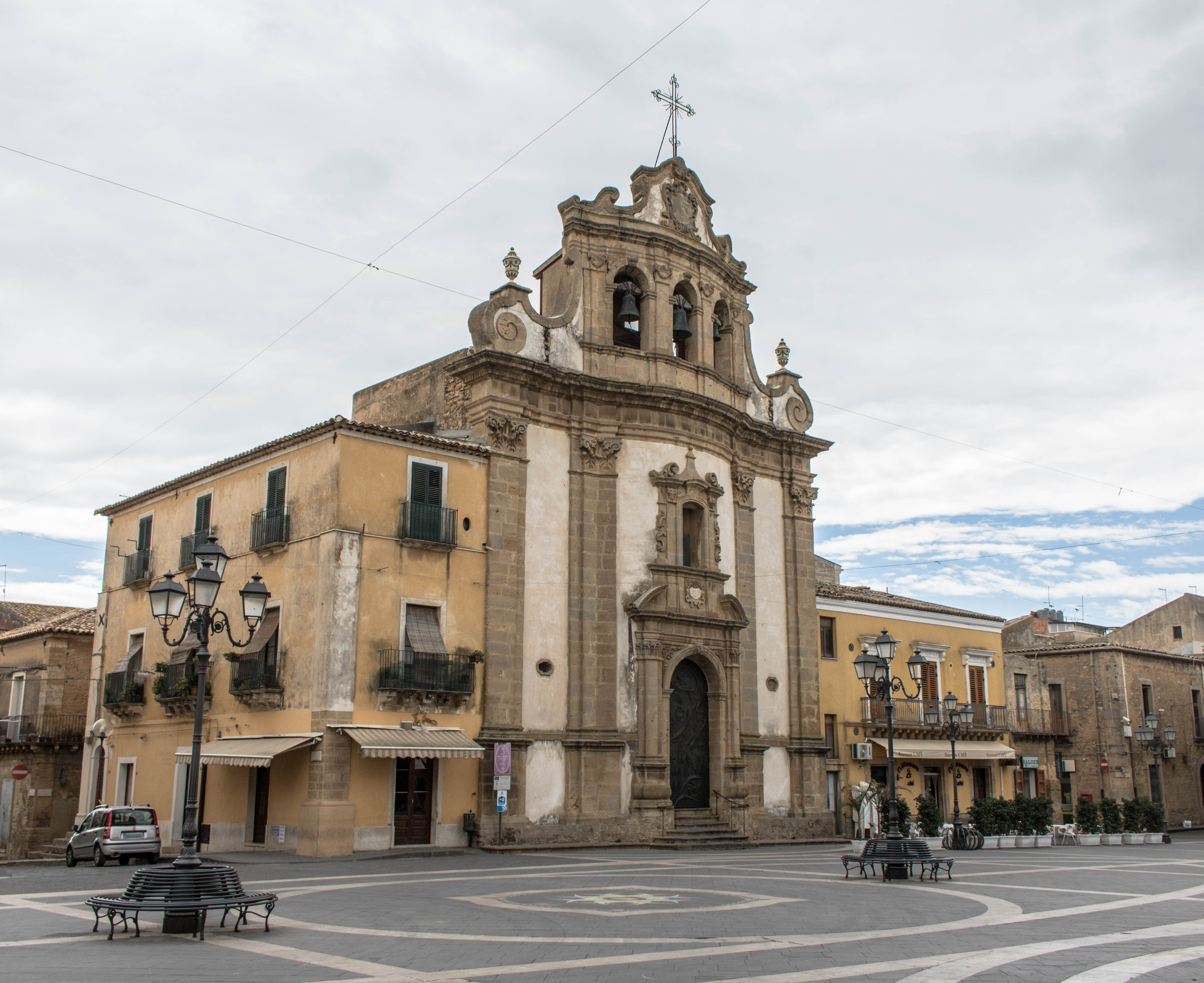
Facade of church

The Chiesa dell’Addolorata e del Ss. Crocifisso or (Church of the Grieving Mary and of the Holy Crucifix) is a Baroque-style church in the town of Niscemi, in the Province of Caltanissetta, region of Sicily, Italy. It is located across a piazza from the mother church of the town, Santa Maria d'Itria.

== History ==
The present church was built in 1753 at the site of a former oratory, called the Chiesina dello Spasimo (Small Church of the Christ in Agony) which belonged to the Confraternity of the Crucifix and a sorority of Maria SS. Addolorata. The architect was Silvestro Gugliara. The church has an octagonal layout more common in devotional churches. The concave facade frames stucco with stone pilasters and decorative elements including flanking volutes.

The interior has three polychrome marble altars sculpted by Domenico Viola. The ceiling is frescoed with a Glory of Christ, Mary, and St John the Evangelist.
