= BT4 =

BT4 or BT-4 may refer to:

- BT-4, a type of BT tank Soviet light tanks
- BT-4 (rocket engine), a rocket engine manufactured by IHI Aerospace
- Brabham BT4, a Formula One racing car
- BT4, a BT postcode area for Belfast
