= Naval Radio Transmitter Facility Niscemi =

American military communications facility in Italy

NRTF Niscemi
- Niscemi, Sicily in Italy

Site information
- Type: Naval Radio Transmitter Facility
- Owner: United States Navy
- Controlled by: Naval Computer Telecommunications Station Sicily
- Website: NCTS, Sicily

Location
- Location of NRTF Niscemi
- Coordinates: 37°07′02″N 14°26′24″E

Site history
- Built: 1991

Naval Radio Transmitter Facility Niscemi (NRTF Niscemi) is a transmission facility of the United States Navy at Niscemi, Sicily, maintained by the N92 Division of Naval Computer and Telecommunications Station Sicily. The facility houses low frequency (LF) and high frequency (HF) transmitter and antenna systems, and certification of the new U.S. Navy Mobile User Objective System (MUOS) ground terminals is in progress as of early 2015.

== Installations ==
The joint American, Italian, and NATO facility houses an AN/FRT-95A Low Frequency Radio Transmitting System, hosts a USAF HF SCOPE Command, part of the High Frequency (HF) Global Communications System (HFGCS) and a US Navy MUOS Ground Station. The surrounding antenna field supports one 827-foot (252 m) LF antenna, 44 HF (3–30 MHz) antennas, three MUOS Earth Terminal parabolic antennas, and 2 UHF Directional Helical antennas for satellite direction finding. Several different types of HF antenna are installed, though the majority are no longer in use. 116 Antenna towers are installed which hold aloft 35 antenna transmission lines. Antenna types include four Horizontal Log Periodic (HLPA) with 2 tall towers each, four rotatable log periodic (RLPA), seven Horizontal Omnidirectional Broadband (HOBA) each with 4 antenna towers, seven High Take-Off Angle (HTOA), 11 Dual Mode (DM) antennae held aloft with 7 towers each, 1 Spira-cone, and 10 decommissioned Horizontal/Vertical HF Loop Antennae. The LF Transmitter uses non-line-of-sight propagation for communication with submarines.

== Local opposition ==
Since 2009 the station has become the target of protests by the people of Niscemi, citing concerns over the expansion of the site, which is located inside the Riserva Naturale Sughereta di Niscemi, a protected Site of Community Importance, and the possible harmful effects of electromagnetic radiation on the local wildlife and inhabitants from the MUOS ground stations. In the face of the protests, in March 2013 the regional government revoked authorisation for the installation of MUOS, and commissioned an independent study by the Italian Istituto Superiore di Sanità ("Higher Health Institute"). The ISS report, issued in July 2013, concluded that there was no evidence that electromagnetic emissions posed a risk, but recommended further monitoring, and authorisation was re-granted. Local "No-MUOS" committees then organized demonstrations, and blocked road access to the site. In the face of this opposition the United States authorities have repeatedly stated that emissions from the site are well below agreed safety standards, and point to the operation of a similar site in Hawaii that has not reported any problems or incidents.

== See also ==
- Niscemi

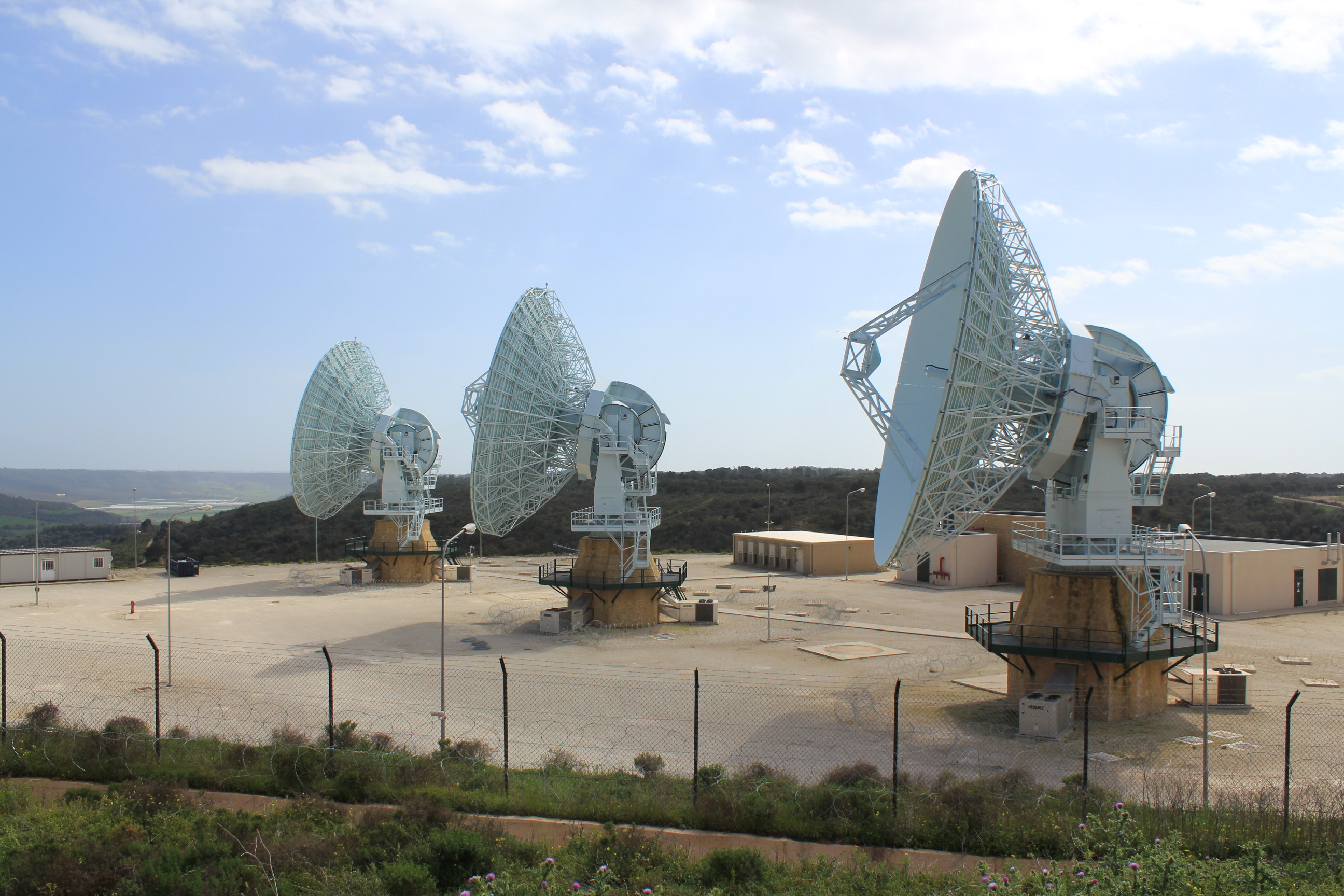
US Navy Mobile User Objective System (MUOS) Earth Terminal Facility at NRTF Niscemi. This ET Facility is unique, located in a Natural reserve the antenna's parabolic dishes were painted sky blue, and the antenna pedestals were covered in natural stone.
