= Santa Maria d'Itria, Niscemi =

Church in Niscemi, Sicily, Italy

Coordinates: 37.14547°N 14.38502°E

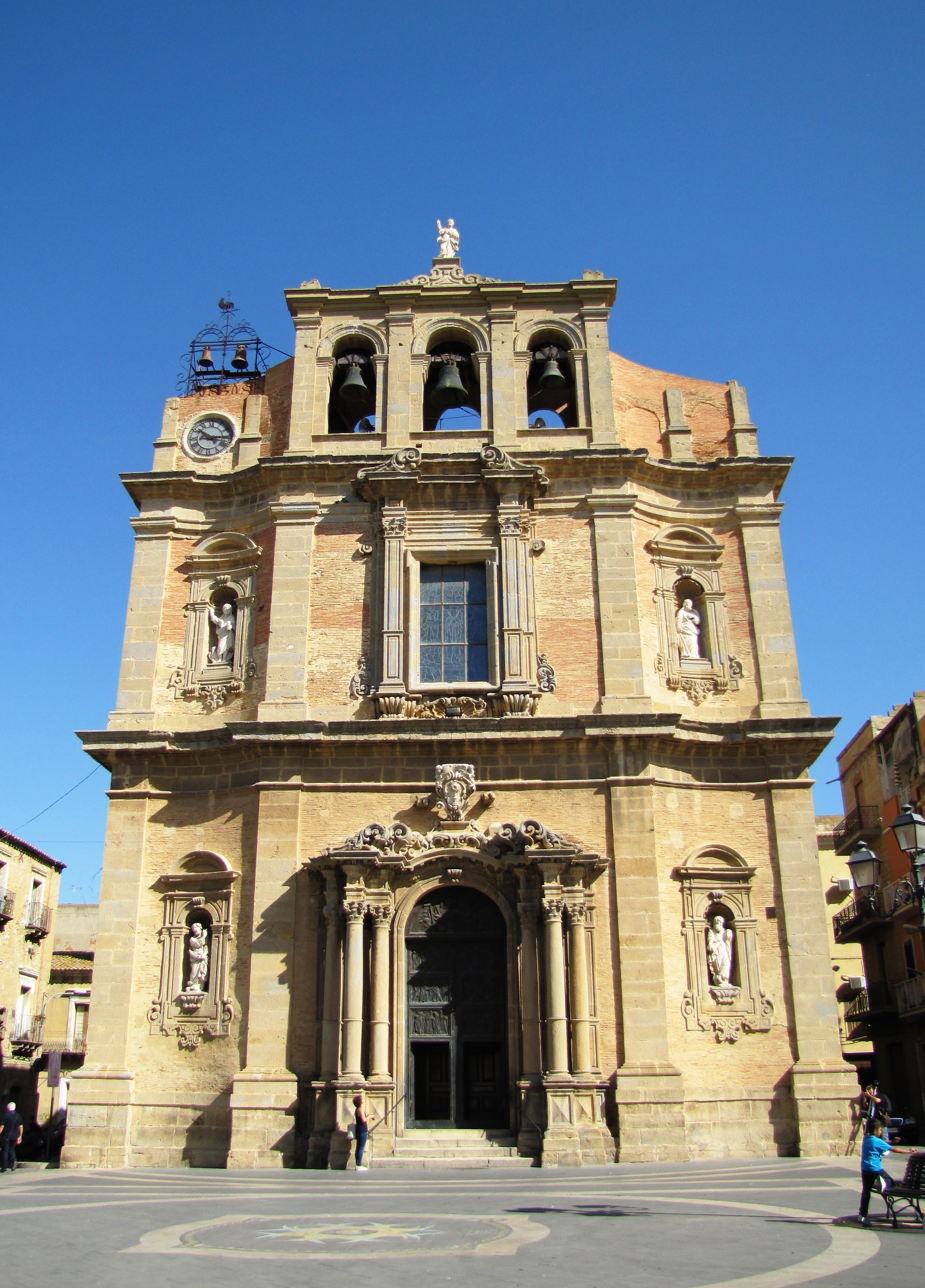
Facade of church

Santa Maria d'Itria is a Baroque-style mother church (duomo) in the town of Niscemi, in the Province of Caltanissetta, region of Sicily, Italy. It rises across the piazza from the church of the Addolorata.

== History ==
At the site of the prior mother church of the town, which had been destroyed by the 1693 Sicily earthquake, the present church was rebuilt starting in 1742 and using designs by Giuseppe La Rosa. Construction ceased in 1752 and was not restarted until the next century, and completed circa 1863. The church facade is three stories with a central sail-shape campanile, and a clock in the left side. The protruding portico over the entrance is supported by four Corinthian columns. The facade niches has four weathered statues representing the evangelists John (on left with eagle) and putatively Mark, and in the lower register, the apostles Saints Peter (left with keys) and putatively Paul. The layout is that of a basilica with a central nave and two aisles. The central bronze portal reliefs were completed in the late 20th century by Yosef Hermann Runggaldien of Ortisei. The crypt of the church was used for burials in past centuries. The interior has a rich neoclassical decoration with stucco and paint.
