= Angelo Marsiano =

Italian historian and essayist (1926–1993)

- Born: 19 February 1926; Niscemi, Sicily, Kingdom of Italy
- Died: 20 June 1993 (aged 67); Niscemi, Sicily, Italy
- Occupations: Historian, essayist

Angelo Marsiano was an Italian author of Sicilian origin. He is known for Geografia Antropica, which was published in 1995 following his death.

== Biography ==
He was born in Niscemi into a family of local artisans. His father was a stonemason, while his mother was a seamstress.

He studied art briefly in the city of Caltagirone, but then enrolled in the Classical High School of Niscemi, where he graduated in 1945. He subsequently studied literature at the University of Catania, but did not graduate.

In the 1980s, he established his city's Cultural Promotion Center, of which he also served as director. Within this context, he promoted cultural events dedicated to the local poet Mario Gori and other cultural initiatives. In 1990, he became president of the local chapter of the Archeoclub d'Italia. He later decided to delve deeper into local history, dedicating himself to the meticulous collection of historical paper documents, later publishing a series of volumes on the history of Niscemi, starting from its geological origins.

In 1987 he published Niscemi between the two world wars, in which the author presents a historical reconstruction of Niscemi from 1914 to the early 1960s. The book also addresses social issues such as peasant struggles for land, the employment of the workforce and the founding of the first cooperative societies. The same year he received the Culture Award from the Presidency of the Council of Ministers from the General Directorate of Information, Publishing and Literary, Artistic and Scientific Property.

His best-known text is Geografia Antropica, published by Lussografica and published posthumously in 1995. It provides an in-depth description of the historical, civil and religious urban planning, and cultural profile of the city of Niscemi. He died in his native Niscemi in 1993 at the age of 67.

== Places of interest ==
The private library 'Angelo Marsiano' of Niscemi, containing over 4 thousand volumes, and which risks collapsing into the void, together with the houses located in the Sante Croci neighborhood of the small town. Writers, intellectuals, journalists, and booksellers organized a veritable mobilization to save it.

The Pisa-Alberghina family, owners and custodians of the book collection of Professor Angelo Marsiano have decided to continue organizing the event in February for the centenary of the birth of the historian from Niscemi, together with the administration of the Municipality of Niscemi, the management of the Civic Museum and the Proloco.

== Works ==
- Maria SS. Del Bosco di Niscemi e il ritrovamento del quadro. Lussografica, Caltanissetta, 1982
- Niscemi - Geografia Fisica, Epos, Palermo, 1982
- Niscemi nel Risorgimento e l'azione di Tommaso Masaracchio, Epos, Palermo, 1982
- Gli usi civici e i boschi del comune di Niscemi, Epos, Palermo, 1984, vol. l e II
- La popolazione di Niscemi dal XVII al XX secolo, Ediprint, Siracusa, 1987
- Canti popolari niscemesi, Lussografica, Caltanissetta, 1988
- Niscemi tra le due guerre mondiali, Lussografica, Caltanissetta, 1991, voll. I e II
- Geografia antropica, Lussografica, Caltanissetta, 1995

== Acknowledgments ==
- 1987: Premio della Cultura della Presidenza del Consiglio dei Ministri.
- 1989: Premio Letterario Nazionale Campofranco, Sez, C - Storia municipale per l’opera La popolazione di Niscemi dal XVII al XX secolo.
- 1994: Premio Internazionale Melvin Jones Fellow assegnato alla memoria dello storico niscemese dal Lions Club di Niscemi.

== Bibliography ==
- Gaetano Vincenzo Vicari, Angelo Marsiano, il demiurgo della storia niscemese, Edizioni Lussografica, Caltanissetta 2002
