= MUOS-5 =

US Navy Comsat satellite

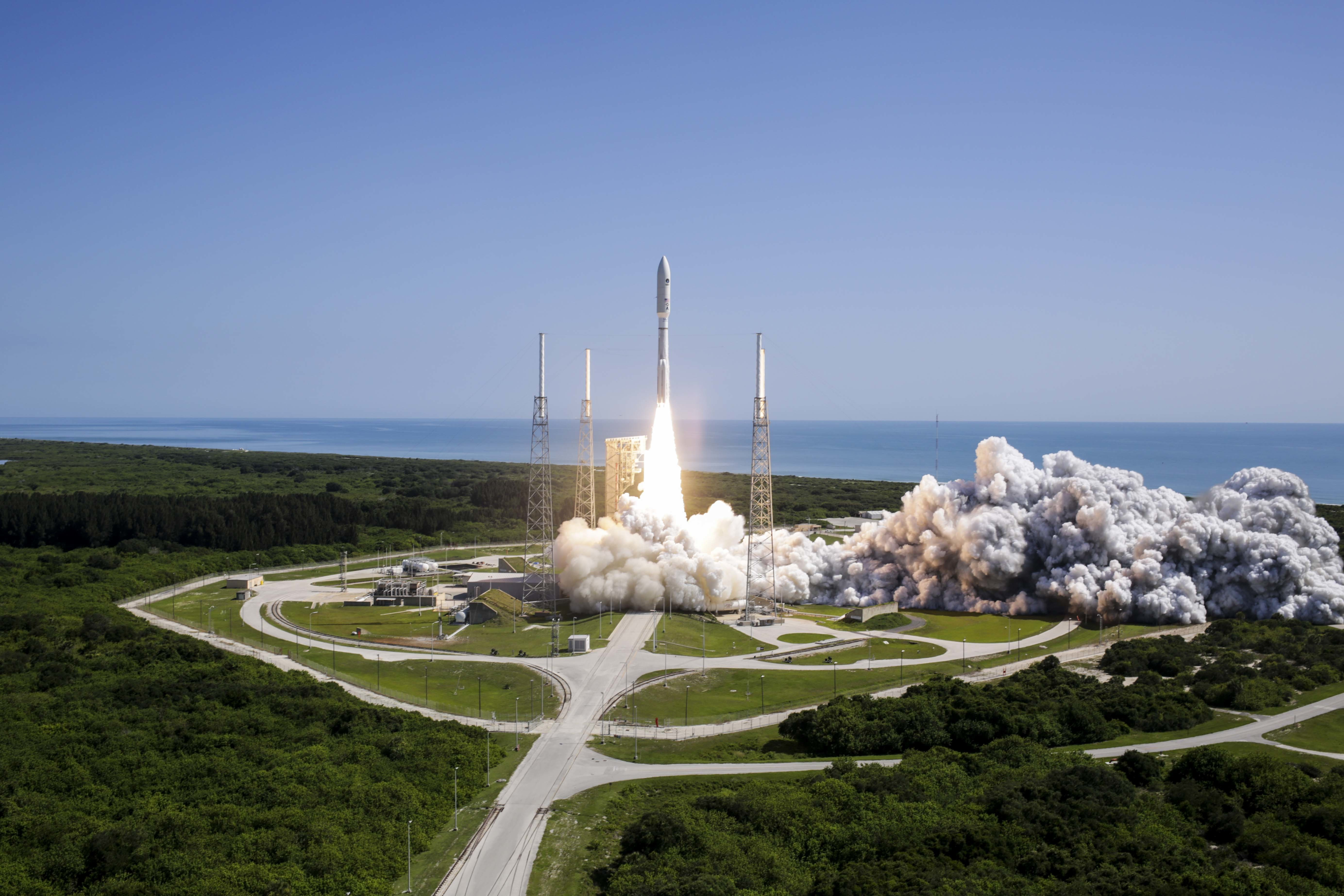
- Launch of MUOS-5
- Mission type: Communications
- Operator: US Navy
- COSPAR ID: 2016-041A
- SATCAT no.: 41622
- Mission duration: 15 years

Spacecraft properties
- Spacecraft type: LM-2100
- Manufacturer: Lockheed Martin
- Launch mass: 6740 Kg
- Dry mass: 3812 Kg

Start of mission
- Launch date: 24 June 2025 14:30:00 UTC
- Rocket: Atlas V 551 (AV-063)
- Launch site: Cape Canaveral, SLC-41
- Contractor: United Launch Alliance

Orbital parameters
- Reference system: Geocentric orbit
- Regime: Geosynchronous orbit

MUOS-5 is an American communications satellite which is operated by the US Navy. Launched in September 2016, it is the fifth and last MUOS satellite.

== Overview ==
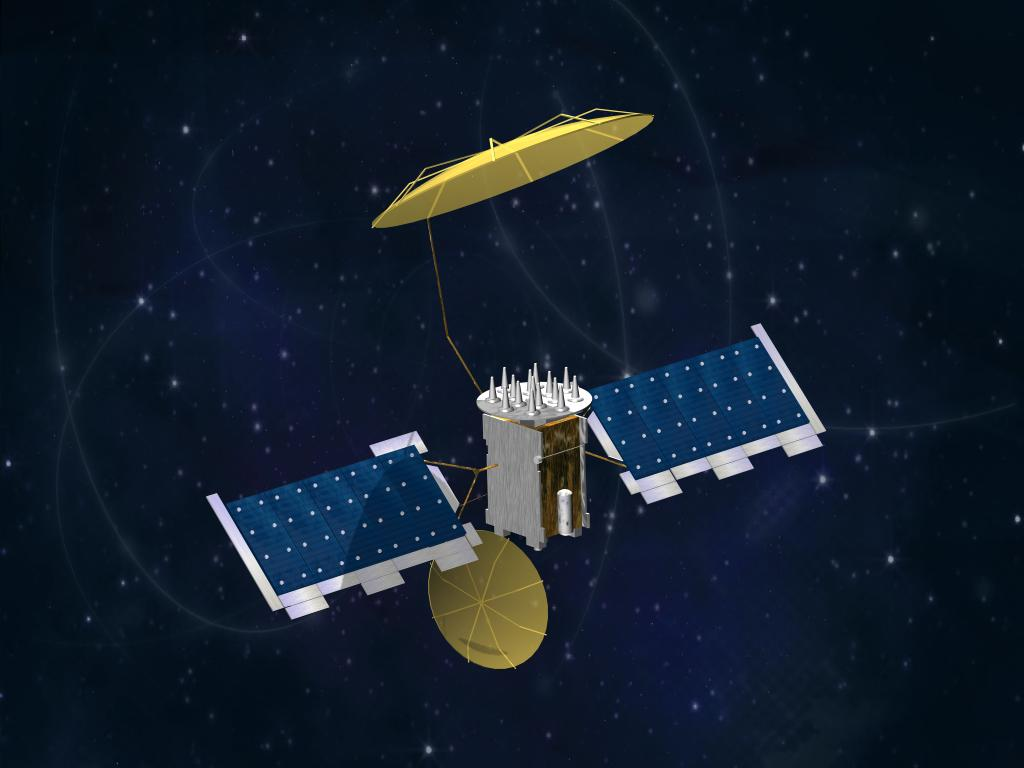
Artistic Representation of MUOS Satellite

Mobile User Objective System (MUOS) is a tatical Communications satellite which is designed to improve Ground Communications for the US Armed Force

MUOS-5 arrived at Cape Canaveral on 9 March 2016. Launch was originally scheduled for on 5 May 2016, but due to an internal investigation into an Atlas V fuel system problem during the Cygnus OA-6 launch on 22 March 2016, the scheduled date was pushed back. The launch took place on 24 June 2016, at 14:30:00 UTC. An "anomaly" aboard the satellite occurred a few days later, however, when it was still in a Geostationary Transfer Orbit (GTO), leaving it "Reconfigured into Safe Intermediate Orbit", or stranded in GTO. Amateur observers tracked it in an orbit of approximately 15,240 × 35,700 km (9,470 × 22,180 mi) since 3 July 2016. On 3 November 2016, the Navy announced that the satellite has finally reached operational orbit.

== See also ==
- National Security Space Launch
