= Mobile User Objective System =

US Space Force communications satellite system

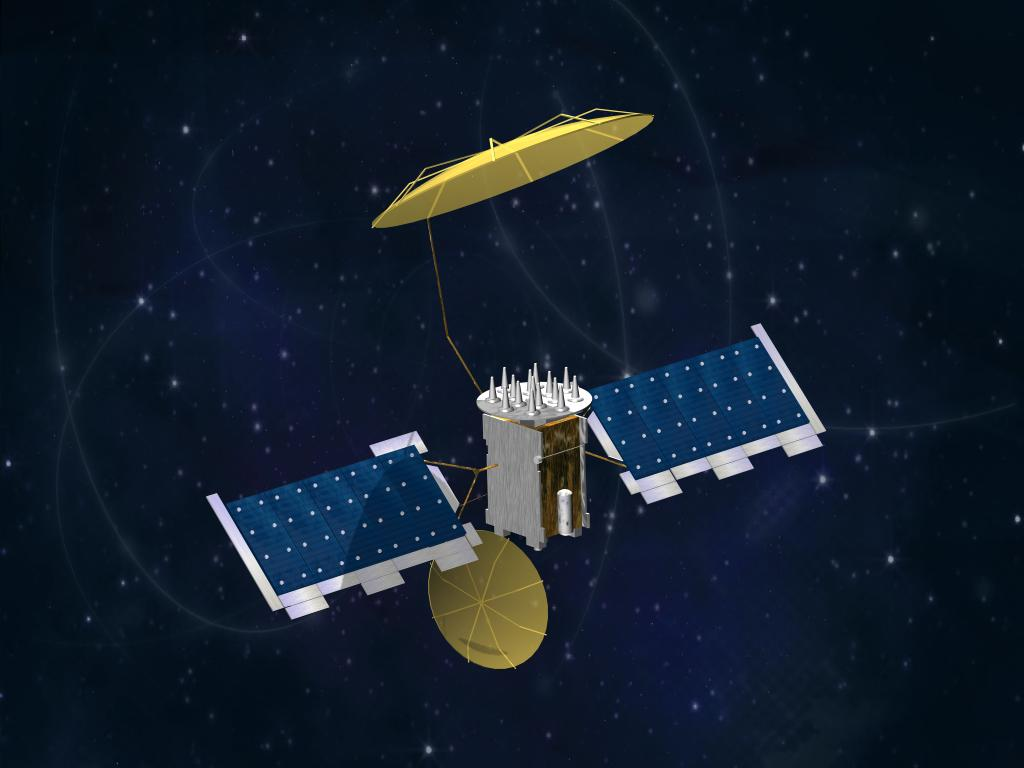
Artist's concept of a MUOS satellite

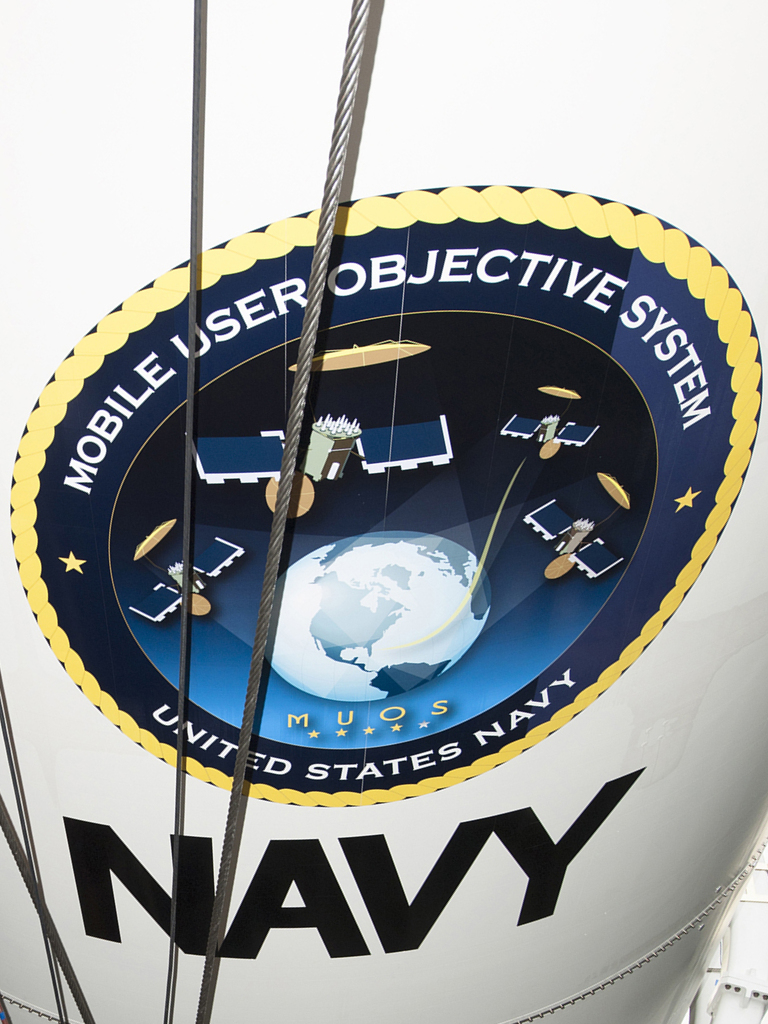
U. S. Navy's Mobile User Objective System logo at the Vertical Integration Facility of Cape Canaveral's Space Launch Complex-41 on August 19, 2015

The Mobile User Objective System (MUOS) is a United States Space Force narrowband military communications satellite system that supports a worldwide, multi-service population of users in the ultra high frequency (UHF) band. The system provides increased communications capabilities to newer, smaller terminals while still supporting interoperability with legacy terminals. MUOS is designed to support users who require greater mobility, higher bit rates and improved operational availability. The MUOS was declared fully operational for use in 2019.

== Overview ==
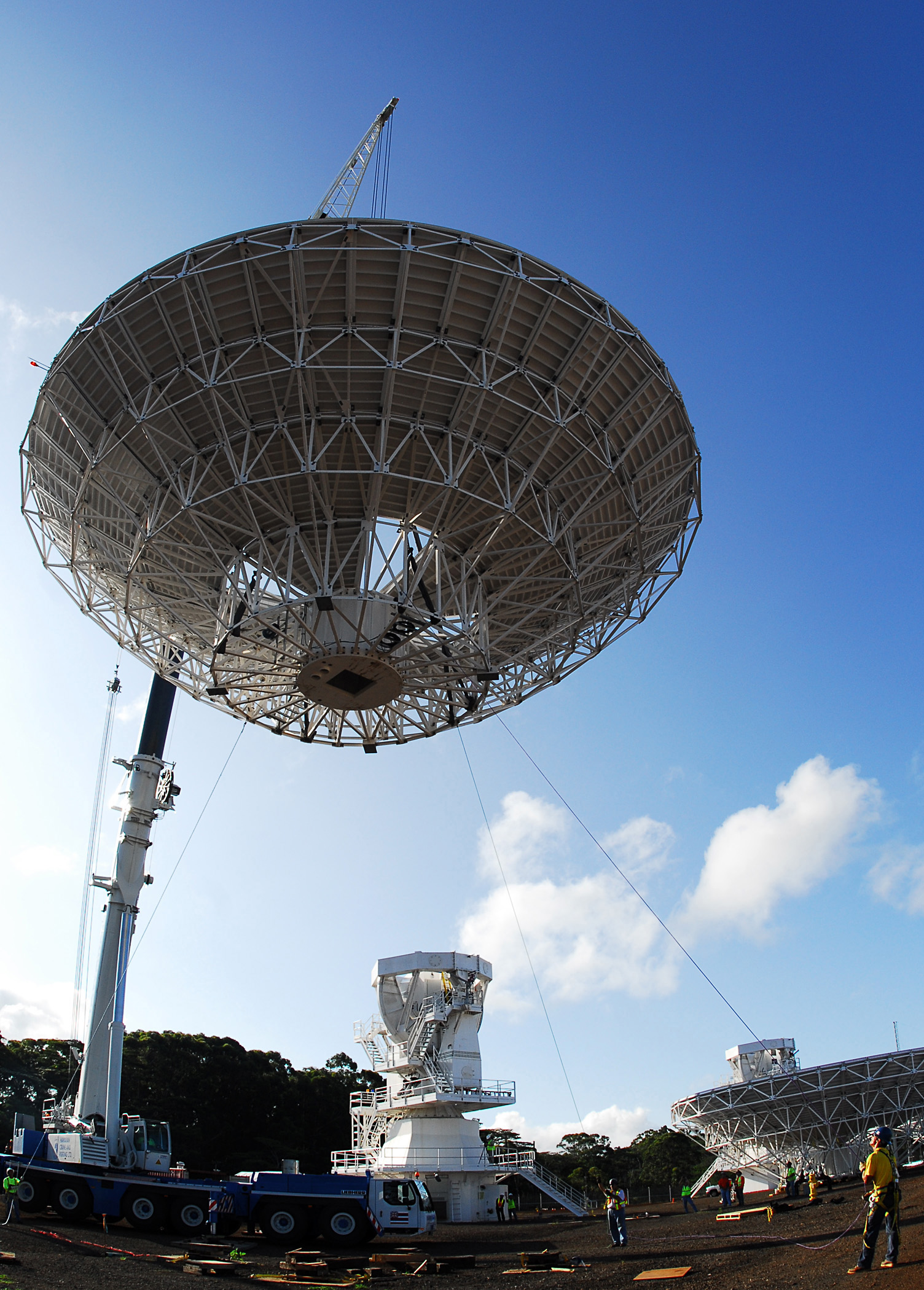
Installing a MUOS satellite dish in Hawaii

The Mobile User Objective System (MUOS), through a constellation of five satellites (four operational satellites and one on-orbit spare), provides global narrowband connectivity to terminals, platforms, tactical operators and operations centers. The system replaces the slower and less mobile 1990s-era Ultra High Frequency Follow-On (UFO) satellite communication system. MUOS primarily serves the United States Department of Defense (DoD); although, international allies' use has been declined in the past. Primarily for mobile users (e.g. aerial and maritime platforms, ground vehicles, and dismounted soldiers), MUOS extend users' voice, data, and video communications beyond their lines-of-sight at data rates up to 384 kbit/s.

The U.S. Navy's Communications Satellite Program Office (PMW 146) of the Program Executive Office (PEO) for Space Systems in San Diego, is lead developer for the MUOS program. Lockheed Martin Space is the prime system contractor and satellite designer for MUOS under U.S. Navy Contract N00039-04-C-2009, which was announced on 24 September 2004. Key subcontractors include General Dynamics Mission Systems (Ground Transport architecture), Boeing (Legacy UFO and portions of the WCDMA payload) and Harris (deployable mesh reflectors). The program delivered five satellites, four ground stations, and a terrestrial transport network at a cost of US$7.34 billion.

Each satellite in the MUOS constellation carries two payloads: a legacy communications payload to maintain Department of Defense narrowband communications during the transition to MUOS, and the advanced MUOS Wideband Code Division Multiple Access (WCDMA) capability, according to Naval Information Warfare Systems Command (NAVWAR).

=== WCDMA system ===
MUOS WCDMA radios can transmit simultaneous voice, video and mission data on an Internet Protocol-based system connected to military networks. MUOS radios operate from anywhere around the world at speeds comparable to 3G smartphones. MUOS radios can also work under dense cover, such as jungle canopies and urban settings. The MUOS operates as a global cellular service provider to support the warfighter with modern cell phone-like capabilities, such as multimedia. It converts a commercial third generation (3G) Wideband Code Division Multiple Access (WCDMA) cellular phone system to a military UHF SATCOM radio system using geosynchronous satellites in place of cell towers. By operating in the Ultra high frequency (UHF) frequency band, a lower frequency band than that used by conventional terrestrial cellular networks, the MUOS provides warfighters with the tactical ability to communicate in "disadvantaged" environments, such as heavily forested regions where higher frequency signals would be unacceptably attenuated by the forest canopy. Connections may be set up on demand by users in the field, within seconds, and then released just as easily, freeing resources for other users. In alignment with more traditional military communications methods, pre-planned networks can also be established either permanently or per specific schedule using the MUOS' ground-based Network Management Center.

=== Legacy payload ===
In addition to the cellular MUOS WCDMA payload, a fully capable and separate UFO legacy payload is incorporated into each satellite. The "legacy" payload extends the useful life of legacy UHF SATCOM terminals and enables a smoother transition to MUOS.

== Launches ==
MUOS-1, after several weather delays, was launched into space successfully on 24 February 2012, at 22:15:00 UTC, carried by an Atlas V launch vehicle flying in its 551 configuration.

MUOS-2 was launched on schedule on 19 July 2013, at 13:00:00 UTC aboard an Atlas V 551 (AV-040).

MUOS-3 was launched on board a United Launch Alliance (ULA) Atlas V launch vehicle on 20 January 2015, from Cape Canaveral Air Force Station (CCAFS), Florida.

MUOS-4 arrived at Cape Canaveral on 31 July 2015. Weather conditions pushed back the launch, which was originally scheduled for on 31 August 2015, at 10:07 UTC. The launch took place on 2 September 2015, at 10:18:00 UTC.

MUOS-5 arrived at Cape Canaveral on 9 March 2016. Launch was originally scheduled for on 5 May 2016, but due to an internal investigation into an Atlas V fuel system problem during the Cygnus OA-6 launch on 22 March 2016, the scheduled date was pushed back. The launch took place on 24 June 2016, at 14:30:00 UTC. An "anomaly" aboard the satellite occurred a few days later, however, when it was still in a Geostationary Transfer Orbit (GTO), leaving it "Reconfigured into Safe Intermediate Orbit", or stranded in GTO. Amateur observers tracked it in an orbit of approximately 15,240 × 35,700 km (9,470 × 22,180 mi) since 3 July 2016. On 3 November 2016, the Navy announced that the satellite has finally reached operational orbit.

== MUOS operational positions ==
The four currently operational MUOS satellites are stationed at longitude 100° West (MUOS-1); 177° West (MUOS-2); 16° West (MUOS-3); and 75° East (MUOS-4). MUOS-5 is a spare satellite now orbiting over the Continental US. They have a 5° orbital inclination. In the first few months after launch, the satellites were temporarily parked in a check-out position at longitude 172° West.

== MUOS ground stations ==
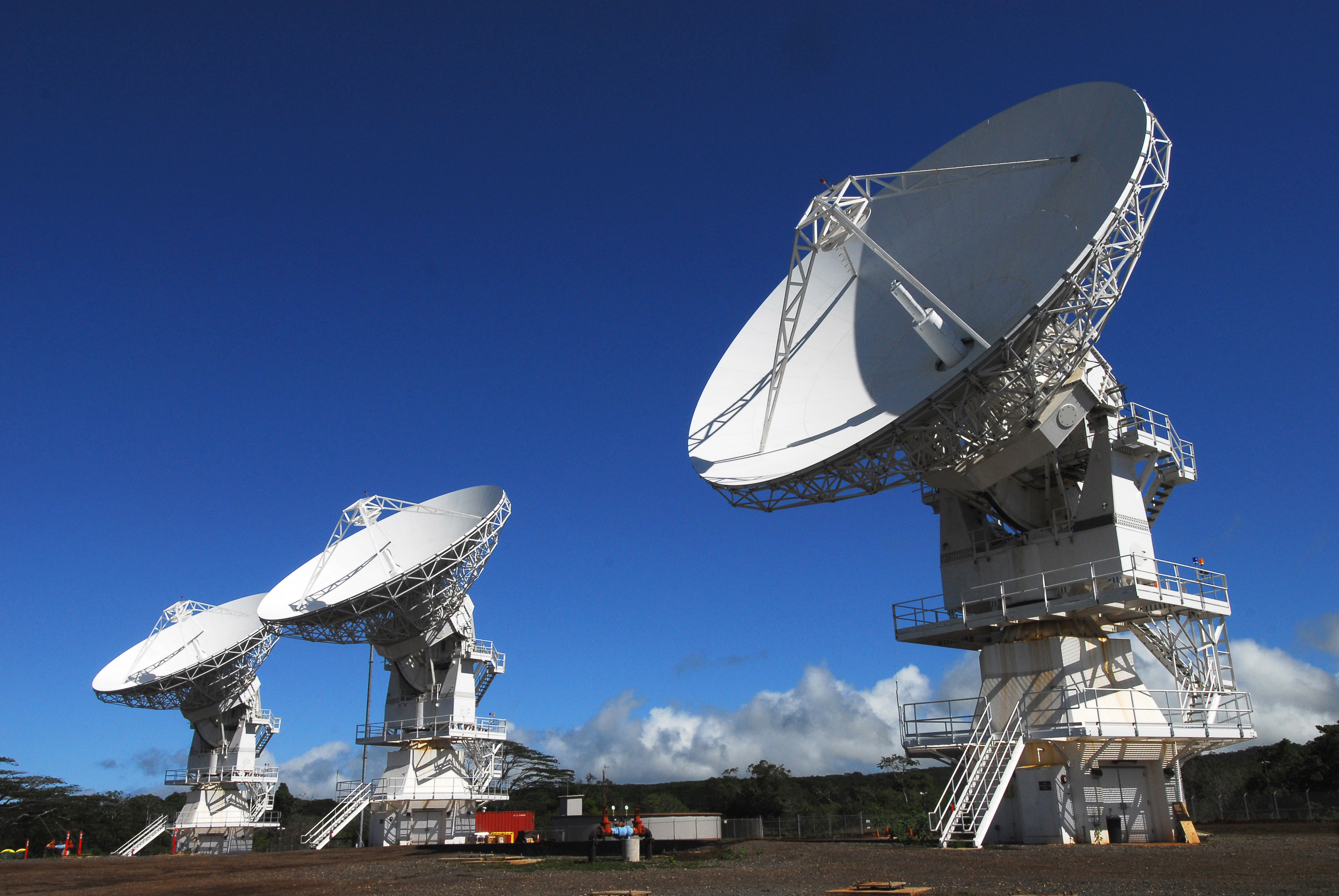
MUOS ground station in Wahiawa, Hawaii

The MUOS includes four ground station facilities. Site selections were completed in 2007 with the signing of a Memorandum of Agreement (MOA) between the U.S. Navy and the Australian Department of Defence. The four ground stations, each of which serves one of the four active satellites of the MUOS constellation will be located at: the Australian Defence Satellite Communications Station at Kojarena, Western Australia about 30 km east of Geraldton, Western Australia; Naval Radio Transmitter Facility (NRTF) Niscemi about 60 km from Naval Air Station Sigonella, Sicily, Italy; Naval SATCOM Facility, Northwest Chesapeake, Southeast Virginia at 36.564393°N 76.270477°W; and the Naval Computer and Telecommunications Area Master Station Pacific, Hawaii.

=== Controversy ===
Construction of the ground station in Italy was halted for nearly half of 2012 by protesters concerned with health risks and environmental damage by radio waves. One scientific study "point[s] to serious risks to people and the environment, such as to prevent its realization in densely populated areas, like the one adjacent to the town of Niscemi". In spite of the controversy, the site at Niscemi was completed in anticipation of the launch of MUOS-4.

== Radio terminals ==
The MUOS waveform with complete red/black operational capability was released in 2012. Until the Joint Tactical Radio System (JTRS) program cancellation in 2011, the JTRS program would provide the DoD terminals that can communicate with the MUOS WCDMA waveform with a series of form-factor models. The JTRS Handheld, Manpack and Small Form Fit (HMS) AN/PRC-155 manpack built by General Dynamics Mission Systems survived the wider JTRS program cancellation and has shipped several low rate of initial production (LRIP) units. Rockwell Collins AN/ARC-210 airborne terminal and Harris Corporation AN/PRC-117G. Manpack have also been certified for operation on the MUOS system.

== Arctic and Antarctic capabilities ==
Lockheed Martin and an industry team of radio vendors demonstrated extensive Arctic communications reach near the North Pole, believed to be the most northerly successful call to a geosynchronous satellite. WCDMA calls to the far north will be increasingly important where there has been an increase in shipping, resource exploration and tourism without much improvement in secure satellite communications access. Based on these and continued tests, full coverage of the Northwest Passage and Northeast Passage shipping lanes is expected. Several follow-on tests with high quality voice and data including streaming video have occurred in both the Arctic and Antarctic, including a 2015 demonstration from McMurdo Station.

== See also ==
- Global Information Grid
- Network-centric warfare
