= Lunar-A =

Cancelled space probe

LUNAR-A
- Operator: JAXA
- Website: LUNAR-A page

Spacecraft properties
- Launch mass: 520 kg (1,150 lb)

Start of mission
- Launch date: Cancelled
- Rocket: M-5

Moon orbiter

Orbital parameters
- Periselene altitude: 200 km
- Aposelene altitude: 300 km
- Inclination: 30°

Moon impactor

LUNAR-A was a cancelled Japanese spacecraft project that was originally scheduled to be launched in 1995, then delayed to August 2004. After many delays (primarily due to potential thruster faults), the project was eventually cancelled in January 2007. It was planned to be launched on a Japanese M-V rocket from the Kagoshima Space Center.

== History ==
The vehicle would have been cylindrical, with a diameter of 2.2 m and a height of 1.7 m. It would have had four solar panels and was engineered to be spin-stabilized. Plans called for it to enter an elliptical orbit around the Moon, and deploy two penetrators at an altitude of 40 km on opposite sides of the lunar body. The penetrators were to have been braked by a small rocket at an altitude of 25 km, then free fall to the surface. They were designed to withstand a collision speed of 330 meters per second to deeply penetrate the lunar regolith.

Once the penetrators deployed, the LUNAR-A spacecraft was mission-planned to maneuver to an orbital altitude of 200 km above the lunar surface. The craft was to have carried a monochromatic imaging camera with a resolution of 30 m.

== See also ==
- Japan Aerospace Exploration Agency
- Moon
- Future lunar missions
- Exploration of the Moon
