= Niscemi =

- Comune
- Comune di Niscemi
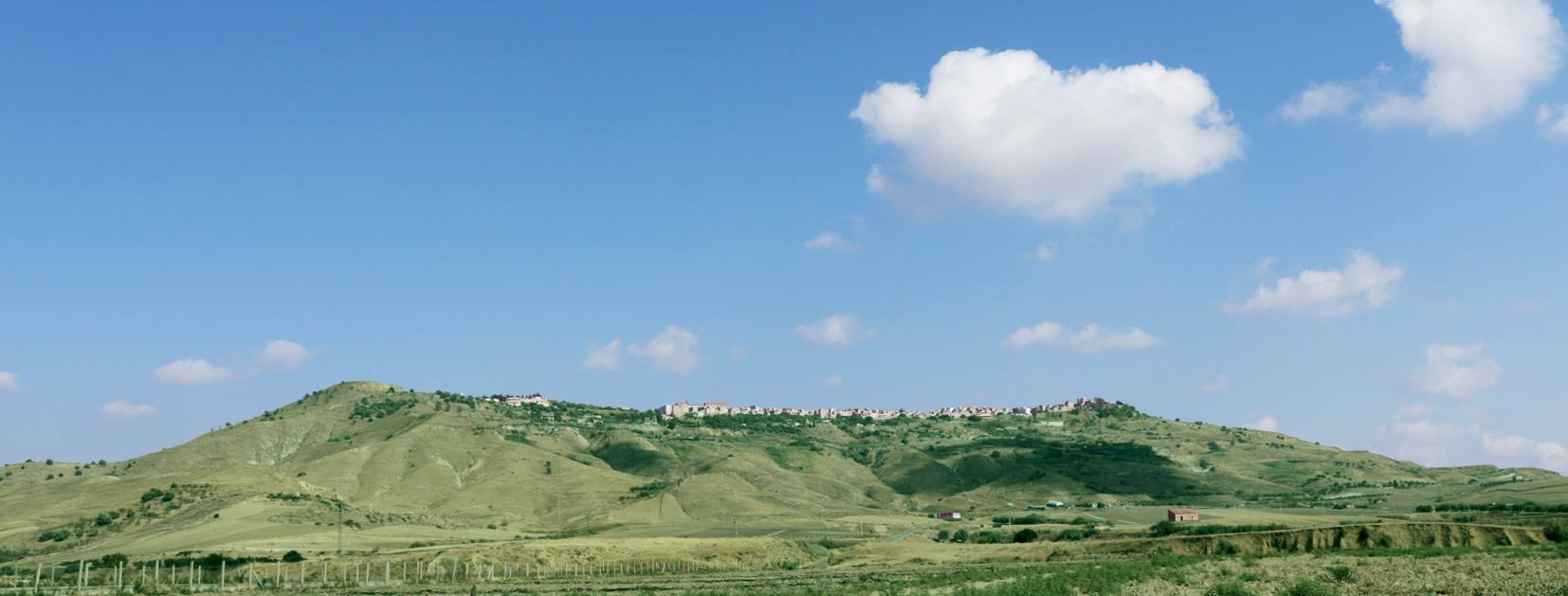
- Niscemi skyline

- Coat of arms

- Location within Italy Location within Sicily
- Coordinates: 37°09′N 14°23′E
- Country: Italy
- Region: Sicily
- Province: Caltanissetta

Government
  - Mayor: Massimiliano Valentino Conti

Area
  - Total: 96 km^{2} (37 sq mi)
- Elevation: 332 m (1,089 ft)

Population (December 31, 2025)
  - Total: 24,535
  - Density: 260/km^{2} (660/sq mi)
- Demonym: Niscemesi
- Time zone: UTC+1 (CET)
  - Summer (DST): UTC+2 (CEST)
- Postal code: 93015
- Dialing code: 0933
- Patron saint: Maria Santissima del Bosco
- Saint day: May 21
- Website: Official website

Niscemi is a small city and comune in the free municipal consortium of Caltanissetta (Italian: libero consorzio comunale di Caltanissetta), Sicily, Italy. It has a population of 24,535 inhabitants.

The municipality is located in the Gela plain area and constitutes its north-eastern part in contact with the territory of Caltagirone. It is 90 km from Catania.

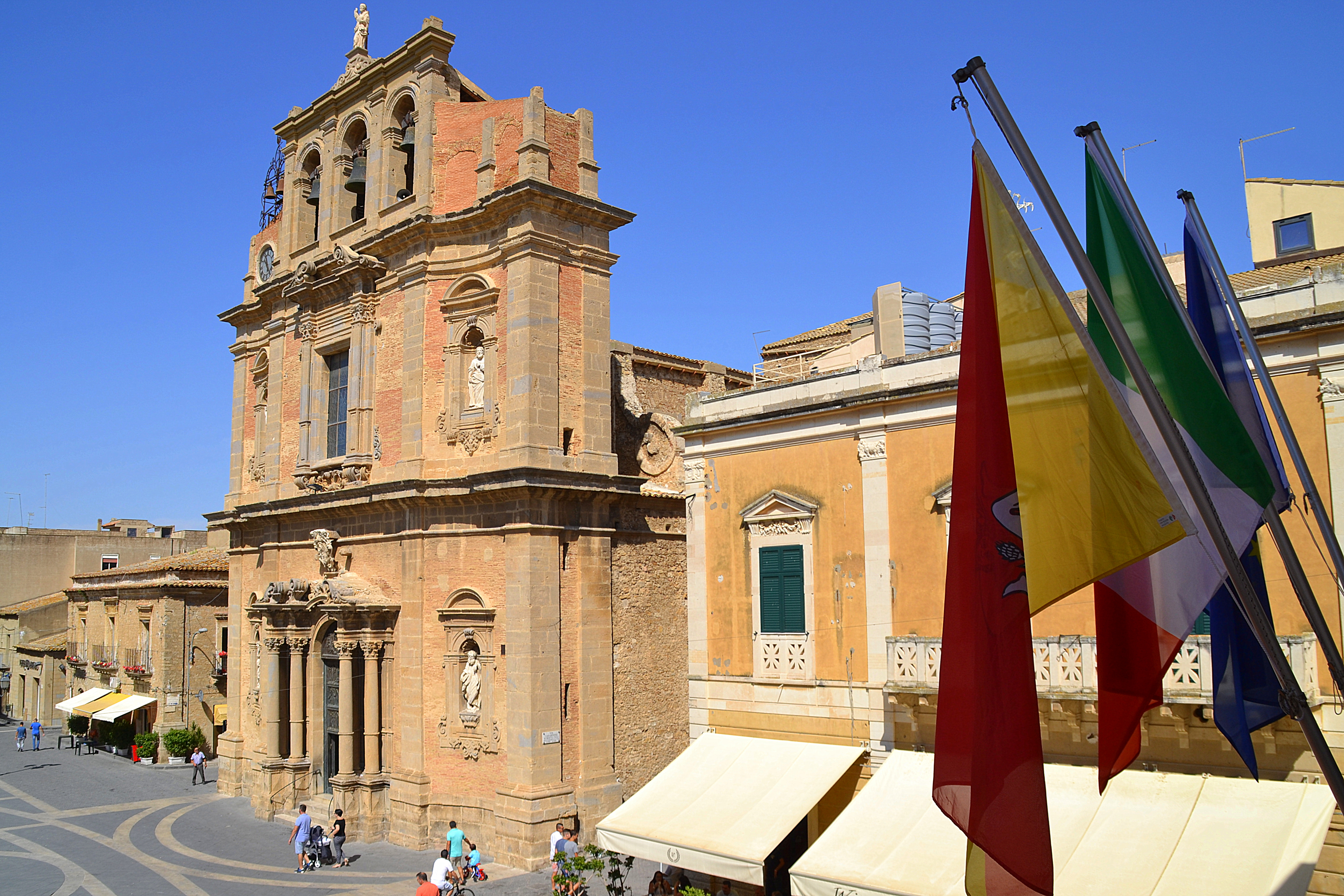
Church of Santa Maria d'Itria

== Etymology ==
The name Niscemi is derived from the Arabic word نَشَم neshem or its singular form نَشَمَة neshemeh, this being the name of a particular type of tree.

== Geography ==
=== Territory ===
The town is located on a plateau 332 m above sea level. The municipality covers an area of 9,654 hectares with a population density of 285 inhabitants per square kilometer. Niscemi is situated on a hill nestled in the Erei Mountains and on the slopes of the Iblei Mountains, with a western view of the Maroglio River valley and the Gela Plain.

The territory of Niscemi is located in a geological context characterised by Miocene clay hills, covered by a large mantle of Pliocene sands, calcareous tuffs and conglomerates.

The Sugherata di Niscemi Nature Reserve is the remnant of a vast wooded area that covers the last foothills of the Iblei Mountains, sloping down towards the coast of the Gela plain. It rises at 330 meters above sea level, on the part of the plateau where the town is located.

== History ==
=== Foundation and Norman period ===
Following the Norman conquest, a new town was founded under the name of Nixenum in 1143. Having become a rural fief, the territory underwent radical changes until, in 1324, a branch of the Branciforte family moved from Piacenza in Sicily (in the 13th century) and bought the lands of Nixenum.

Niscemi, a simple rural village during the Swabian-Angevin period, was part of the County of Garsiliato, which included the territories of Terranova di Sicilia, present-day Gela. After a complex history, the county was granted in 1393 by the Aragonese King Martin the Younger to Don Nicola Branciforte, Lord of Mazarin, and his successors. A long and intricate historical network connects this event to the founding of Niscemi, officially recognized by the Licentia populandi of June 30, 1626, granted to Donna Giovanna Branciforte on behalf of her son Giuseppe by the Viceroy, Cardinal Giovanni Doria, in exchange for the payment of 400 eleven. This network spans the history of all of Sicily, woven by the most powerful families on the island and leading, as everyone knows, to the repopulation of the region through the policy of large estates and the founding of new cities.

The principality of Niscemi was founded in 1627 by the Branciforte family, the city was heavily damaged by the earthquake of 1693 and was completely rebuilt on the same site.

=== Contemporary Age ===
In 1997, a landslide swept away a large part of the Sante Croci neighborhood; 70 homes were destroyed. The church for which the neighborhood is named remained standing on the edge of the chasm but had to be demolished later.

=== 2026 Landslide ===
On January 25, 2026, the town was damaged by another landslide in the same area, spectacular and highly destructive although it caused no casualties: during a storm, a section of the cliff bordering the plateau on which the town center is perched collapsed, destroying some buildings and leaving houses dangerously on the edge of the precipice, while according Italian civil protection authorities have evacuated more than a thousand people within a four-kilometer radius of the disaster.

ISPRA's IdroGEO allows the analysis of the landslide through thematic maps, historical data and satellite and ground monitoring systems, used to follow the evolution of the phenomenon.

== Monuments and places of interest ==
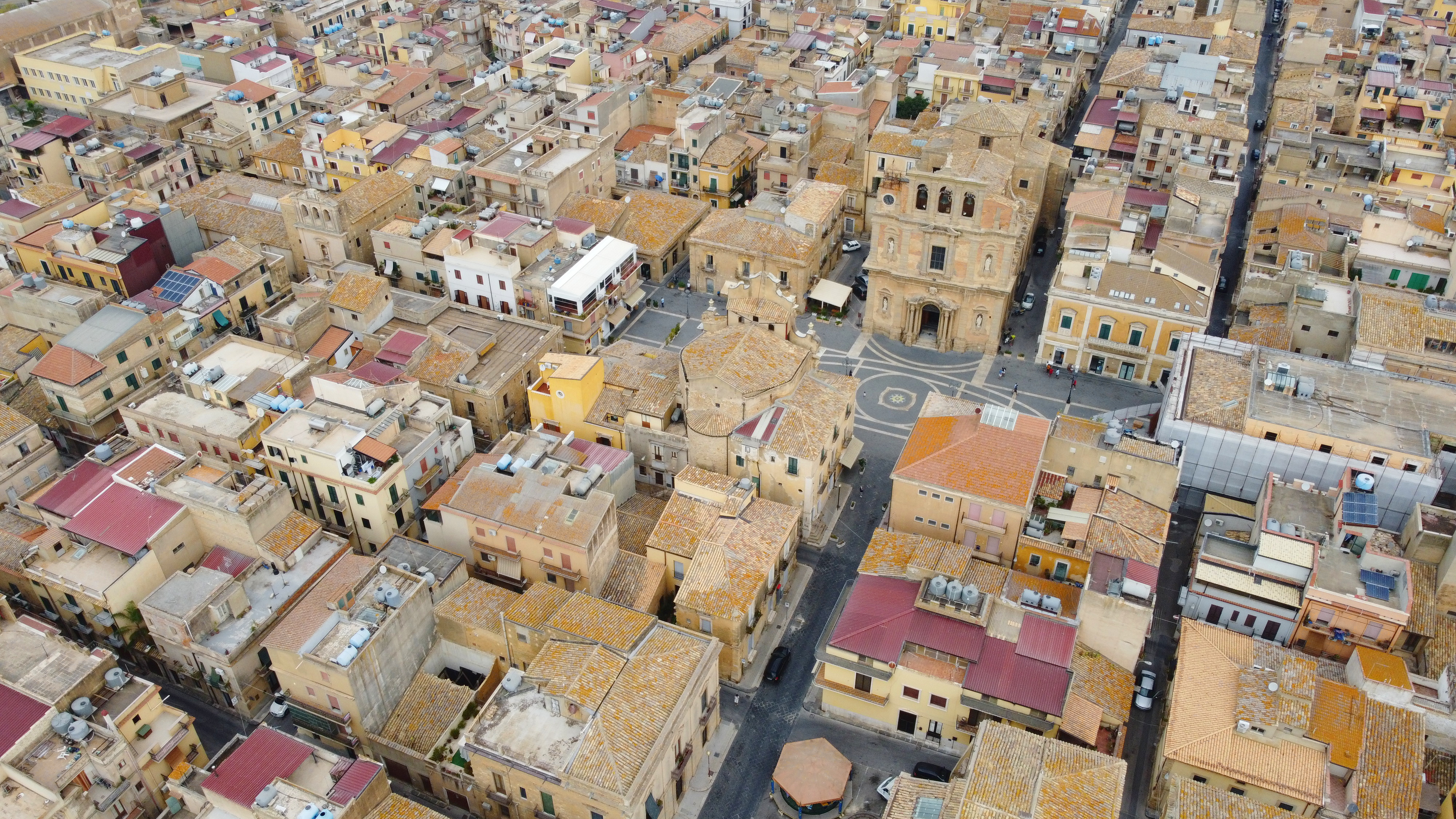
Niscemi historic center

The historic center dates back to the second half of the 17th century. Piazza Vittorio Emanuele III is rectangular in shape and overlooks the churches of Santa Maria d'Itria and Addolorata, as well as the Palazzo di Città.

=== Religious architecture ===
- Santa Maria d'Itria: mother church of town and it stands in Piazza Vittorio Emanuele III. Rebuilt after the 1693 Val di Noto earthquake.
- Church of the Addolorata (18th century)
- Church of the Madonna del Bosco (18th century), elliptical plan
- Remains of the ancient Nixenum

=== Civil architecture ===
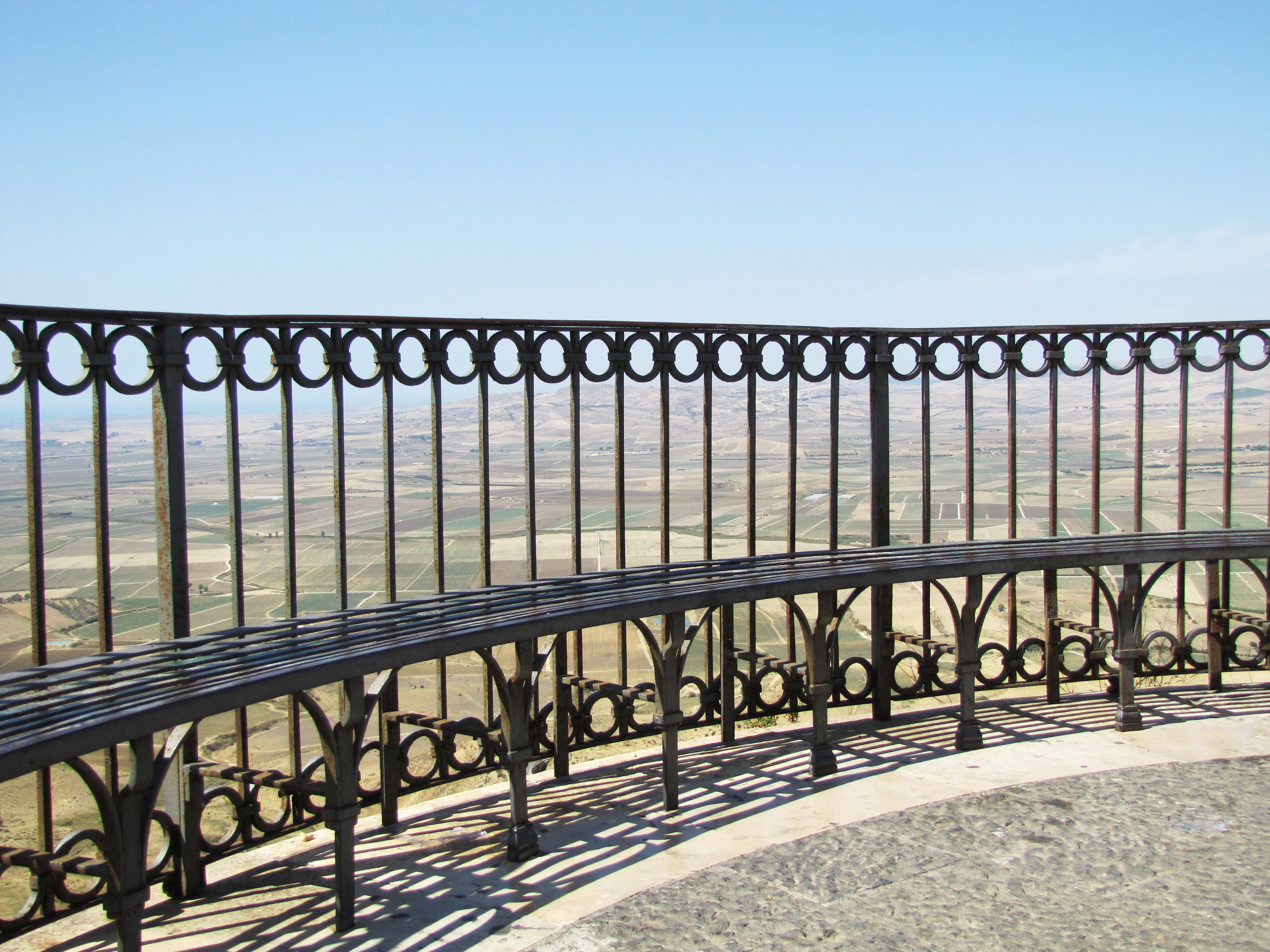
View from the Belvedere terrace in 2016

- Belvedere Terrace: formerly known as Tunnu, is a panoramic terrace built in 1803, offering a magnificent view of the Gela plain and the Maroglio River valley. Built in Baroque style at the beginning of the 19th century, it has a rounded shape surrounded by a wrought-iron railing and benches. It represents the final destination of a stroll through the historic center. It was rebuilt in 1921 following damage sustained in a landslide. It was completely destroyed in a landslide in January 2026. In the area below the belvedere, a path dedicated to the Italian aviator Angelo D'Arrigo was recently built. It offers a panoramic view of the Gela plain.

== Society ==
=== Demographic evolution ===
Historical population

Year	Pop.	±%
1861	9,138	—
1871	10,666	+16.7%
1881	12,110	+13.5%
1901	14,748	+21.8%
1911	15,315	+3.8%
1921	17,230	+12.5%

Year	Pop.	±%
1931	15,149	−12.1%
1936	20,281	+33.9%
1951	23,928	+18.0%
1961	24,860	+3.9%
1971	24,053	−3.2%
1981	24,585	+2.2%

Year	Pop.	±%
1991	26,089	+6.1%
2001	27,641	+5.9%
2011	27,975	+1.2%
2021	25,179	−10.0%

Source: Data from ISTAT

=== Ethnic groups and foreign minorities ===
As of January 1, 2025, there were 694 foreigners residing in the municipality, representing 2.8% of the total population. The following are the largest national groups:

1. Romania: 381
2. Tunisia: 173
3. Morocco: 37

== Culture ==
=== Education ===
Niscemi has a municipal library, named in memory of Mario Gori, born Mario Antonino Di Pasquale. Since 2006 located in Via IV Novembre in a 19th-century building. It houses approximately 16,000 cataloged volumes as well as a vast newspaper library.

The Civic Museum is housed within the former Convent of the Franciscan Friars Minor. It was born from an idea by Totò Ravalli. Its creation is the culmination of 30 years of active research and the collection of thousands of objects, thanks to the synergy between the Municipality of Niscemi, the Lions Club, the Environmental Education Center (CEA), the Superintendence for Cultural Heritage of Caltanissetta, Europe, and the generosity of private citizens. It was inaugurated on October 7, 2018.

The private library Angelo Marsiano contains a collection of approximately 4,000 volumes, notes, manuscripts, and documents that the heirs decided to make accessible to the public. The building sits right on the edge of the precipice created by the landslide, with part of it essentially suspended in mid-air: the first 350 books were recovered through a complex operation.

=== Schools ===
The Leonardo da Vinci Upper Secondary School is located in Niscemi. Founded in 1970 as a scientific sixth-form college, in the years that followed it expanded its educational provision by first introducing a language stream, then a socio-psycho-pedagogical stream, and in recent years a technical commercial college and a vocational college for agriculture and the environment, to which the classical sixth-form college was added in 2016.

=== Art ===
The best-known artist in Niscemi was the painter Giuseppe Barone. Originally from Caltagirone but a resident of Niscemi by choice, in 1927 he painted the four medallion-shaped canvases for the Sanctuary of SS. Maria del Bosco, depicting events linked to devotion to the Madonna del Bosco, and, in 1929, a canvas depicting the Madonna, now housed in the Chapel of the Holy Water. Of the paintings, one depicts the town of Niscemi during the earthquake of 1693. There are several local poets, among whom it is worth mentioning Mario Gori, born Mario Antonino Di Pasquale, who was an Italian poet, writer and author of short stories, after whom a main street in the town and a school are named. No less important for his cultural commitment and historical research is Professor Angelo Marsiano, an Italian historian and essayist after whom a school is named.

=== Events ===
- Artichoke Festival is an event that celebrates local identity, bringing together agricultural tradition, culture. It is regional significance held in April, which attracts people from all over the surrounding area.

== World War II ==
During World War II, Niscemi was the location of Ponte Olivo Airfield, a military airfield used by the United States Twelfth Air Force during the Italian campaign. After the war the area was redeveloped and no evidence of the wartime airfield remains.

== American military installation ==
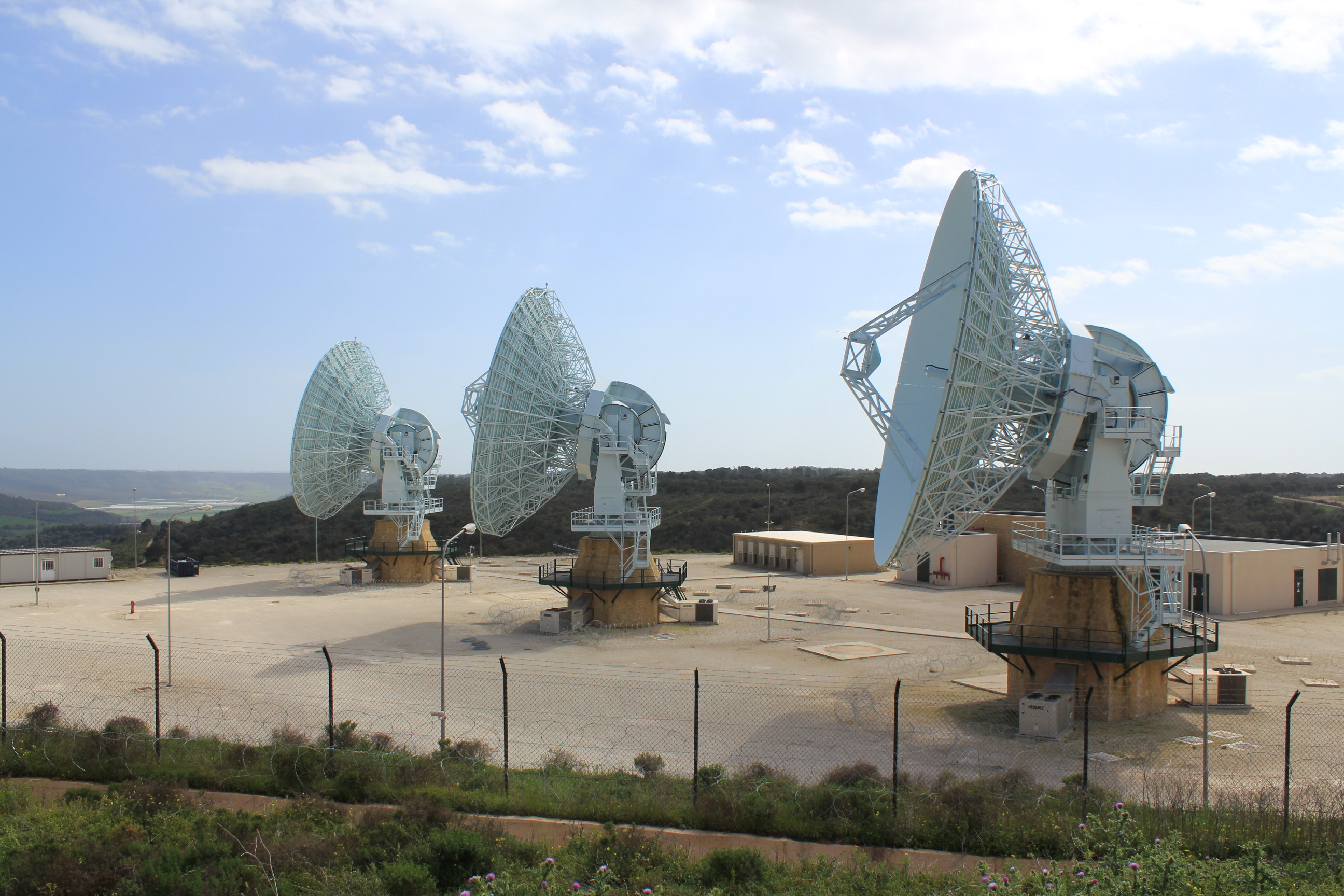
US Navy Mobile User Objective System (MUOS) Earth Terminal Facility at NRTF Niscemi

Today, there is a military radio station for naval communication, U.S. Naval Radio Transmitter Facility (NRTF) Niscemi. Its tallest antenna is a guyed mast, 252 metres (827 ft) high, situated at 37°7'32"N 14°26'11"E.

The United States Navy installation is the focus of ongoing protest by locally based activist groups, who oppose it and demand its removal on grounds of health (danger from electromagnetic radiation), environmental damage and opposition to the use of armed drones in the Middle East, allegedly guided from this base. Allegations of armed drones being operated from this base have never been verified however, as the newly installed MUOS (Mobile User Objective System) was intended as an upgrade to legacy communication equipment, and is not intended to communicate with unmanned flying drones. Niscemi inhabitants say the Berlusconi government did not consult them before granting the US the use of the location.

== See also ==
- Naval Radio Transmitter Facility (NRTF) Niscemi

== Notable people ==
- Angelo Marsiano Italian historian and essayist (1926-1993)
- Alice Mangione Italian sprinter (born 1997)
- Simone Cilio Italian film composer (born 1992)
