= Revising =

Revising may refer to:

- Revise (disambiguation)
- Revision (disambiguation)
- Study skill
