= Revisit =

A revisit (from re- (again, anew) + visit) literally means visit again, such as:

- Satellite revisit
- Patient revisit to a setting of ambulatory care

== See also ==
- Revisionism (disambiguation)
  - Fictional revisionism
