= Donald Trump's disclosures of classified information =

Donald Trump's handling of United States government records, especially those containing classified information, during his tenure as the 45th U.S. president has come under scrutiny. A number of incidents in which the president disclosed classified information to foreign powers and private individuals have become publicly known, sometimes with distinct national security and diplomatic consequences.

Notably, on May 10, 2017, Trump disclosed classified information to Russian government representatives, creating political and security concerns in the United States and its allies, especially Israel. Soon after the meeting, American intelligence extracted a high-level covert source from within the Russian government because of concerns the individual was at risk, in part, by the repeated mishandling of classified intelligence by Trump and his administration.

Other questionable behaviors during his presidency have included Trump's sharing of national defense information on social media and private disclosures, both known and unknown. During Trump's tenure as president, lax security at his Florida resort Mar-a-Lago was a cause of concern because of the uncontrolled flow of guests and events at the resort—a concern that endured inter-presidency, because Trump retained classified documents after leaving office.

== Background ==
=== Handling, storage, and disposition of U.S. government records ===
The Presidential Records Act establishes that presidential records belong to the United States and must be surrendered to the Archivist of the United States at the end of a president's term of office (or second term of office, if consecutive).

The law governs the retention and management of records "created or received" by the president, the vice president, their staffs, and certain other parts of the administration. The National Archives and Records Administration (NARA) is the agency responsible for the execution of provisions of the law, as well as other laws related to records management.

==== Classified material ====
Policies governing the handling of classified records throughout the executive branch have been codified in a series of executive orders, with the most recent being Barack Obama's Executive Order 13526.

Several statutes are also in play. The disclosure of information of national security interest is unlawful under the Espionage Act of 1917, even though that act makes no reference to the classification system, having predated its creation. Information related to nuclear security is governed by the Atomic Energy Act, which deems nuclear information to have been "born secret".

Unauthorized removal and retention of classified information of the United States government is a criminal offense under U.S. federal law; it has been a felony since the enactment of S. 139 (FISA Amendments Reauthorization Act of 2017), a law signed by President Donald Trump in January 2018 which increased the maximum term of imprisonment for this offense from one year to five.

== Handling and destruction of records during presidency ==
Although under the Presidential Records Act official presidential records must be preserved and retained, Trump frequently destroyed and disposed of papers while president. Advisers regularly saw him destroy documents at the White House and Mar-a-Lago, as well as aboard Air Force One. Trump continued this practice throughout his presidency, despite repeated admonishments from at least two of his chiefs of staff and from the White House counsel. Trump's indiscriminate shredding of paper extended to "both sensitive and mundane" materials. In an attempt to deal with Trump's habits, early in his presidency, his aides developed special practices and protocols, with staffers from the Office of the Staff Secretary or the Oval Office Operations team retrieving piles of torn paper. Staff from the White House Office of Records Management pieced documents back together, using clear tape.

Not all materials have been recovered. Trump White House staffers used "burn bags" frequently to destroy documents rather than retain them for handling in accordance with the law. On at least two occasions, Trump apparently flushed documents down the toilet at the White House Residence.

=== Handling and declassifications of classified material ===
During his four years as U.S. president, Trump took a cavalier attitude toward U.S. classified information. After U.S. intelligence assessed in 2017 that the Russian government sought to manipulate the 2016 presidential election and promote Trump's candidacy, Trump ranted against what he claimed was a "deep state" and viewed the assessment as an insult. Months into his presidency, Trump revealed highly classified information to Russian officials in an Oval Office meeting, forcing the CIA to extract a key Moscow source developed over years. In a July 2018 summit in Helsinki with Russian leader Vladimir Putin, Trump accepted Russia's denials that it had interfered in the 2016 election, rejecting the U.S. government's conclusions to the contrary. Trump frequently blasted the U.S. intelligence agencies on Twitter, and on two occasions, Trump revealed classified information on his Twitter feed (in 2017, he made a Twitter post revealing a CIA program in Syria, and in August 2019, he posted a classified satellite photo of a site in Iran that revealed U.S. satellite surveillance capabilities). Three years later, the National Geospatial-Intelligence Agency formally declassified the satellite image that Trump had tweeted, following a FOIA request, which required a Pentagon-wide review to determine if the briefing slide could be made public. His national security adviser, John Bolton, would later describe him as "a collector of things that he thought were of interest to him", including "classified documents". Bolton said Trump routinely kept documents from intelligence briefings and "it became the practice" of his advisers to retrieve as many as they could.

Trump's erratic behavior led to mistrust from the U.S. intelligence and law enforcement agencies, who were also alarmed by Trump's mixing with guests during his frequent trips to Mar-a-Lago, viewing the practice as "ripe to be exploited by a foreign spy service eager for access to the epicenter of American power". Mar-a-Lago is frequented by its hundreds of members, as well as guests who visit or rent the facilities. In 2017, after North Korea conducted a ballistic-missile test, at least one Mar-a-Lago patron posted photos on social media of Trump talking on his cell phone and conferring with Japanese Prime Minister Shinzo Abe in the resort's dining room. In 2019, authorities arrested a Chinese national carrying phones and other electronic devices who had left a reception area at the club; the incident heightened security concerns regarding the club. During Trump's presidency, a sensitive compartmented information facility (SCIF) was operational at Mar-a-Lago for communications with the White House Situation Room and Pentagon. The SCIF was removed after he left office.

Stephanie Grisham, who was White House press secretary from July 2019 to April 2020 and was the First Lady's press secretary before and after that, later said: "I watched him show documents to people at Mar-a-Lago on the dining room patio. So, he has no respect for classified information, never did."

In October 2020, Trump said on Twitter that he had "fully authorized the total declassification" of all documents related to what he called "the Russia hoax" and the Hillary Clinton email controversy. However, news organizations were told that these documents were still classified, and Trump's then-chief of staff Mark Meadows, in a sworn federal court filing, said that Trump had told him that Trump's "statements on Twitter were not self-executing declassification orders and do not require the declassification or release of any particular documents".

In January 2021, Meadows sought to declassify unreleased Crossfire Hurricane materials which included text messages between former FBI agents Peter Strzok and Lisa Page. Meadows dismissed concerns from the FBI of compromising the bureau, stating that Trump intended to declassify and release them. Trump declassified them after the White House settled with the FBI on redactions. However, Department of Justice (DOJ) officials warned Meadows that his plan to give the materials to conservative journalists could violate privacy law.

When Trump left office, President Joe Biden barred him from receiving the intelligence briefings traditionally given to former presidents, citing Trump's "erratic behavior".

== 2017 Oval Office incident with Russia ==
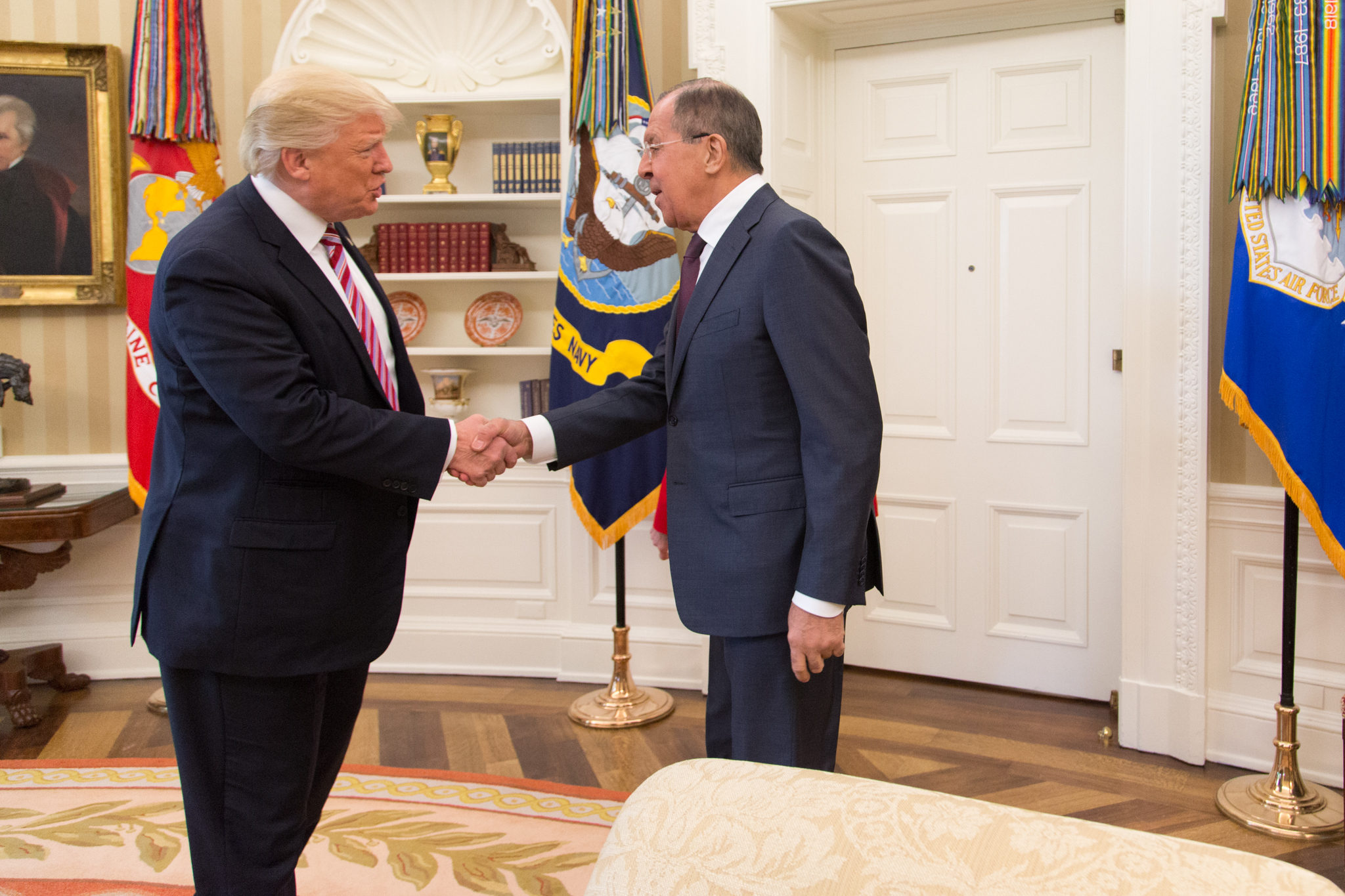
President Trump meets with Lavrov (pictured) and Kislyak on May 10, 2017. A photographer from Russian News Agency TASS was present, but no other press.

President Donald Trump discussed classified information during an Oval Office meeting on May 10, 2017, with the Russian Foreign Minister Sergey Lavrov and the Russian Ambassador Sergey Kislyak. The information was provided by a U.S. ally and concerned a planned Islamic State (ISIL) operation, providing sufficient detail that the Russians could use to deduce the identity of the ally and the manner in which it was collected, according to current and former government officials. The meeting had been closed to the U.S. press, although a photographer from the Russian press contingent was present. The disclosure was first reported in The Washington Post on May 15, 2017. White House staff initially denied the report, but the following day, Trump defended the disclosure, stating that he has the "absolute right" to "share" intelligence with Russia.

=== Origin of intelligence ===
The May 15 The Washington Post article reported that the intelligence came from an unnamed Middle Eastern ally. On May 16, The New York Times named the relevant ally and source of the intelligence as Israel, saying that as a consequence, Trump's boasts to the Russian envoys could damage America's relationship with Israel and endanger Israel's security if Russia passed the intelligence on to Iran, Israel's main threat in the Middle East. The intelligence was so sensitive that it hadn't even been shared among key U.S. allies. Other reports later emerged backing up the New York Times report that Israel was the source of the information. Israel did not confirm or deny the report, but released a statement stating full confidence in the intelligence sharing relationships with the United States. Ynetnews, an Israeli news website, had previously reported on January 12 that in a meeting held in early January (during Trump's presidential transition), U.S. intelligence officials advised Israeli Mossad and other intelligence officials to "be careful" when transferring intelligence information to the Trump White House and administration until the possibility of Russian influence over Trump, suggested by Christopher Steele's report (commonly referred as the Steele dossier), had been fully investigated. U.S. officials were concerned that the information, particularly about sensitive intelligence sources, could be passed to Russia and then to Iran. Two Israeli intelligence officials confirmed privately that Trump's disclosure of the intelligence to Russia was "for us, our worst fears confirmed." They said the disclosure jeopardized Israel's "arrangement with America which is unique to the world of intelligence sharing" and that Israeli officials were "boiling mad and demanding answers".

The report was described as "shocking" and "horrifying" by some commentators and former U.S. intelligence officials. According to current and former U.S. officials interviewed by ABC News, Trump's disclosure endangered the life of a spy placed by Israel in ISIL-held territory in Syria. The classified information Trump shared came from a source described as the most valuable of any current sources on any current external plotting, according to The Wall Street Journal.

=== Reporting ===
On May 15, 2017, The Washington Post, citing anonymous sources, reported that the intelligence was about an ISIL plot to stealthily use laptops as weapons that can then explode in Western countries, and that a Middle Eastern ally provided the intelligence, which was codeword-classified, meaning that its distribution was restricted only to those who were explicitly cleared to read it, and was not intended to be shared beyond the United States and certain allies. The incident was later reported by The New York Times, BuzzFeed, and Reuters. The officials talking to BuzzFeed said, "it's far worse than what has already been reported."

Immediately after Trump's disclosure, "which one of the officials described as spontaneous", "senior White House officials appeared to recognize quickly that Trump had overstepped and moved to contain the potential fallout." Immediately after the meeting, Thomas P. Bossert, assistant to the president for homeland security and counterterrorism, telephoned the directors of the CIA and the NSA to inform them what had occurred.

The incident was seen as a pivot away from traditional American allies, and towards closer relations with Russia, and raised questions on Trump's respect for the Five Eyes intelligence-sharing agreement.

Several commentators stated that by releasing classified information to Russia, Trump jeopardized American and allied intelligence sources, breached the trust relationship with America's foreign partners, threatened the long-term national security of the country, and violated his oath of office through "gross negligence". All of these actions were possible legal grounds towards efforts to impeach Donald Trump. Aides privately defended the President, stating that Trump did not have sufficient interest or knowledge of the intelligence gathering process to leak specific sources or methods of intelligence gathering; National Security Advisor H. R. McMaster publicly maintained that Trump had not been briefed on the origins of the intelligence in question and therefore could not have compromised the source.

According to conservative commentator Erick Erickson, multiple sources stated that Trump's actions were far worse than what had been reported, and that one of the Post's sources was a strong supporter of Trump who believed it was necessary to publicly disclose the story because of Trump's inability to accept criticism.

=== White House response ===
White House staff initially denied the veracity of the report during the evening of May 15. In a press briefing on the same day, McMaster denied The Washington Post report, saying, "At no time, at no time, were intelligence sources or methods discussed. And the president did not disclose any military operations that were not already publicly known. Two other senior officials who were present, including the secretary of state, remember the meeting the same way and have said so. And their on-the-record accounts should outweigh those of anonymous sources." He concluded by saying, "I was in the room, it didn't happen." McMaster said that "it was wholly appropriate to share" the information because of a similar ISIL plot two years earlier.

Secretary of State Rex Tillerson stated that "common efforts and threats regarding counter-terrorism" were discussed in the meeting with Lavrov, but not "sources, methods or military operations". Deputy National Security Advisor for Strategy Dina Habib Powell flatly rejected the Post article, saying: "This story is false. The president only discussed the common threats that both countries faced."

=== Israeli response ===
Israeli intelligence officials were reportedly horrified by the disclosure. In public comments, Israeli officials including intelligence minister Yisrael Katz, Ambassador to the United States Ron Dermer, and Defense Minister Avigdor Lieberman said the intelligence services of the two countries would continue to share information, with Dermer saying "Israel has full confidence in our intelligence-sharing relationship with the United States." However, speaking privately, unnamed Israeli sources said they might need to reassess what intelligence they share with the U.S. Israeli officials stated that it is Israel's "worst fears confirmed" about Donald Trump. The officials also stated that Israeli intelligence officers were "boiling mad and demanding answers" on its current intelligence-sharing agreement with the US.

On May 22, while visiting Israel, Trump appeared to confirm both the disclosure and the identity of Israel as the source, telling the press: "Folks, folks, just so you understand, just so you understand, I never mentioned the word or the name Israel during that conversation." It had been widely reported before May 22 that Israel was the source.

On May 16, Trump implicitly confirmed a disclosure in a tweet, claiming that:

As President, I wanted to share with Russia (at an openly scheduled W.H. meeting) which I have the absolute right to do, facts pertaining ... to terrorism and airline flight safety. Humanitarian reasons, plus I want Russia to greatly step up their fight against ISIS & terrorism.

=== Reactions ===
==== U.S. Congress ====
Speaker of the House Republican Paul Ryan said through a spokesman that he "hopes for a full explanation of the facts from the administration".

Senator Bob Corker, chairman of the Senate Foreign Relations Committee, said that the allegations were "very, very troubling" if true, and Senator John McCain called the report "deeply disturbing" and continued:

Reports that this information was provided by a U.S. ally and shared without its knowledge sends a troubling signal to America's allies and partners around the world and may impair their willingness to share intelligence with us in the future. Regrettably, the time President Trump spent sharing sensitive information with the Russians was time he did not spend focusing on Russia's aggressive behavior, including its interference in American and European elections, its illegal invasion of Ukraine and annexation of Crimea, its other destabilizing activities across Europe, and the slaughter of innocent civilians and targeting of hospitals in Syria.

Senate Democratic Leader Chuck Schumer said: "The president owes the intelligence community, the American people and Congress a full explanation."

Senator Dick Durbin, the Senate Democratic Whip, said that Trump's conduct was "dangerous" and "reckless".

Senator Jack Reed, the ranking Democratic member of the United States Senate Committee on Armed Services, said: "President Trump's recklessness with sensitive information is deeply disturbing and clearly problematic."

The Democratic National Committee issued a statement, which included this: "If Trump weren't president, his dangerous disclosure to Russia could end with him in handcuffs."

==== Foreign countries ====
Reaction from foreign countries was generally negative. A top European intelligence official said that sharing of intelligence with the United States would cease if the country confirms that Trump did indeed share classified information with Russia, because sharing intel with Americans while Trump is president could put their sources at risk.

Burkhard Lischka, a member of the German Bundestag's intelligence oversight committee, said that if Trump "passes this information to other governments at will, then Trump becomes a security risk for the entire western world".

Russian Foreign Ministry spokeswoman Maria Zakharova denied the U.S. media reports.

==== Academics ====
Several professors of law, political science, and international relations, as well as intelligence experts, were alarmed by Trump's disclosure.

Intelligence expert Amy Zegart of Stanford University noted that Trump revealed code word intelligence, which is the highest layer of classification, even higher than the "top secret" classification. Such information, if revealed, could reasonably be expected to cause "exceptionally grave damage" to the national security of the United States. She wrote, "so just how bad is the damage? On a scale of 1 to 10—and I'm just ball parking here—it's about a billion."

Counterterrorism expert Daniel Byman of Georgetown University said that disclosures such as Trump's could jeopardize intelligence sharing relationships, which "perhaps more than any other policy instrument ... play a vital role in counterterrorism against global terrorist groups like the Islamic State and Al Qaeda." The effects could be "disastrous".

Professor Jack Goldsmith and other contributors to the Lawfare website said that Trump's release of classified information could be a violation of the President's oath of office: "There's thus no reason why Congress couldn't consider a grotesque violation of the President's oath as a standalone basis for impeachment—a high crime and misdemeanor in and of itself. This is particularly plausible in a case like this, where the oath violation involves giving sensitive information to an adversary foreign power. That's getting relatively close to the "treason" language in the impeachment clauses; it's pretty easy to imagine a hybrid impeachment article alleging a violation of the oath in service of a hostile foreign power. So legally speaking, the matter could be very grave for Trump even though there is no criminal exposure." While the authors argued Trump "did not violate any criminal law concerning the disclosure of classified information" because of the president's broad authority to declassify information, another legal scholar, Professor Stephen Vladeck, wrote that the president's "constitutional power over national security information" is not unfettered and that Trump's disclosure "may actually have been illegal under federal law."

Harvard Law emeritus professor Alan Dershowitz called the incident "the most serious charge ever made against a sitting president" and said that it was "devastating", with "very serious political, diplomatic, and international implications".

=== Aftermath ===
Leaking of sensitive information by the U.S. has led to the review of intelligence sharing arrangements by key allies, and also a review by the Department of Justice regarding the leaks from the United States.

Soon after the Oval Office meeting, intelligence officials reportedly became concerned about the safety of a high-level CIA source within the Putin government, and decided to bring him out of Russia. The source had refused an earlier offer to extract him. The extraction, or "exfiltration", was carried out sometime in 2017. CNN and other news sources reported on this extraction in September 2019, along with details about the Russian. One source told CNN that the decision to remove him was based in part on concern about the Trump administration's mishandling of classified information. However, other sources said the concern for his safety was primarily based on a 2017 CIA report about Russian interference in the election, which had such specific information it might make Russia suspect a high-placed spy. A CIA spokesperson said the news reports were "misguided speculation", and a White House spokesperson said the reporting was "incorrect" and "has the potential to put lives in danger," although they did not specify why they considered the reporting flawed.

== 2019 tweet revealing spy-satellite capabilities ==
On August 30, 2019, Trump tweeted a classified image of recent damage to Iran's Imam Khomeini Spaceport that supposedly occurred as a result of an explosion during testing of a Safir SLV. Within hours of the tweet, aerospace experts, as well as amateur satellite trackers, had determined the photograph came from National Reconnaissance Office's USA-224, a highly classified reconnaissance satellite that is part of the KH-11 series of multi-billion-dollar spy satellites.

Intelligence officials were astonished by Trump's public release of a surveillance photo with exceptionally high resolution, revealing highly classified U.S. surveillance capabilities. Steven Aftergood of the Federation of American Scientists said of Trump's tweet: "He was getting literally a bird's eye view of some of the most sensitive US intelligence on Iran. And the first thing he seemed to want to do was to blurt it out over Twitter." Robert Cardillo, who was director of the National Geospatial-Intelligence Agency (NGA) from 2014 to 2019, said he did not recall any authorized release of an image similar to the image revealed by Trump to his 60 million Twitter followers; Cardillo said he was "certain" that the U.S.'s adversaries, such as Russia and Iran, would have used the image to assess the U.S.'s capabilities. Before Trump's 2019 tweet, the only confirmed photographs from a KH-11 satellite were leaked in 1984 by a U.S. Navy analyst who went to prison for espionage. Trump defended the tweet by saying he had "the absolute right" to release the photo. The NGA declassified the original image in 2022, following a Freedom of Information Act request by NPR and an extensive U.S. Department of Defense declassification review of the briefing slide.

In 2023, John Bolton, who had been Trump's national security adviser, said of the tweet: "There's utterly no excuse for that. There's no conceivable reason for that, except it made him feel good to be able to do it."

== Other disclosures of intelligence ==
=== Disclosures while president ===
In an April 29, 2017, phone call, Trump told Philippines President Rodrigo Duterte that the U.S. had positioned two nuclear submarines off the coast of North Korea. This was during a time when Trump was warning of a possible "major, major conflict" with North Korea. The locations of nuclear submarines are a closely guarded secret, even from the Navy command itself: "As a matter of national security, only the captains and crew of the submarines know for sure where they're located."

On May 24, 2017, Britain strongly objected to the United States leaking to the press information about the Manchester Arena bombing, including the identity of the attacker and a picture of the bomb, before it had been publicly disclosed, jeopardizing the investigation. British Prime Minister Theresa May issued a public rebuke, and British police temporarily stopped passing information to U.S. counterparts.

In July 2017, after a private meeting with Russian President Vladimir Putin at the 2017 G20 Hamburg summit, Trump took the unusual step of confiscating and keeping his interpreter's notes. This led U.S. intelligence officials to express concern that Trump "may have improperly discussed classified intelligence with Russia."

On Christmas 2018, Trump and First Lady Melania Trump flew to Al Asad Airbase where Trump posted video to Twitter of several members of Seal Team Five in their camouflage and night-vision goggles, revealing the team's location and un-blurred faces.

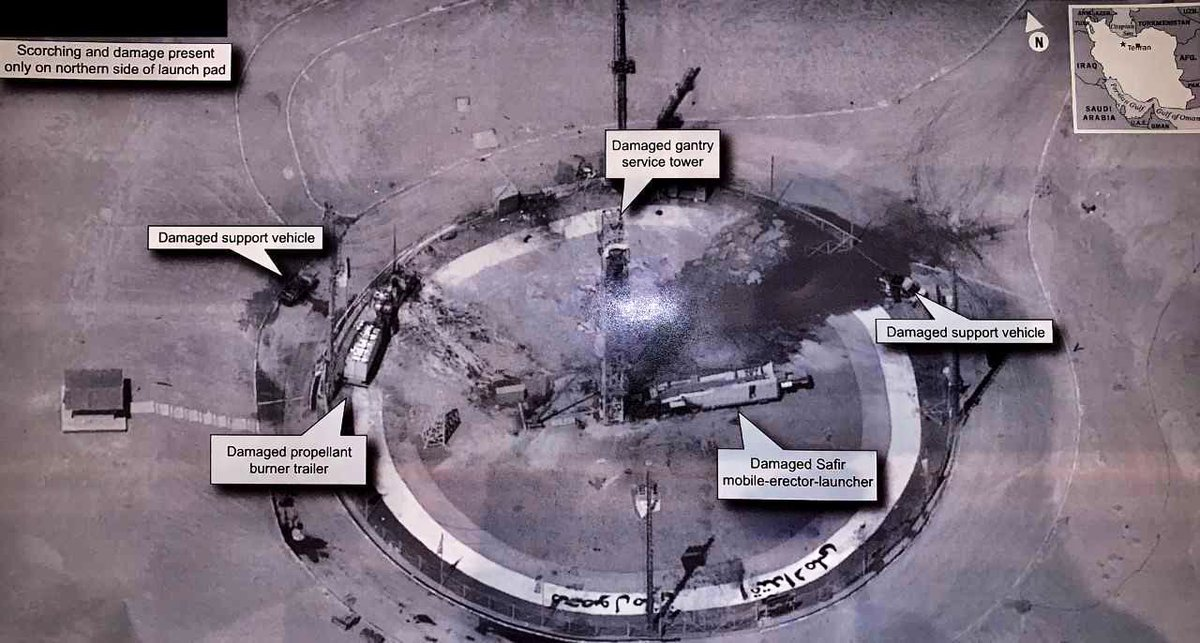
The photo of damage to Imam Khomeini Spaceport released by Trump in a tweet

In a December 2019 interview with Bob Woodward, Trump stated, "I have built a nuclear—a weapons system that nobody's ever had in this country before," adding, "We have stuff that Putin and Xi have never heard about before. There's nobody. What we have is incredible."

=== Later disclosures ===
In 2021, Trump reportedly told close associates that he regarded some presidential documents, such as correspondence with the North Korean leader Kim Jong-un, as his personal property, although U.S. records legally belong to the government.

In April 2021, Anthony Pratt, an Australian billionaire, met with Trump at Mar-a-Lago. Trump allegedly told him about U.S. nuclear submarines, and Pratt communicated the information to journalists and over a dozen foreign officials. In 2023, US. federal prosecutors and FBI agents interviewed Pratt twice. Trump allegedly also told Pratt about private calls with the leaders of Ukraine and Iraq.

== End of first presidential term and beyond ==
=== Last weeks of first term ===
Trump's first presidential term ended at noon on January 20, 2021. His departure from the White House was "rushed and chaotic" because he spent his final days in office attempting to overturn his defeat in the 2020 United States presidential election, his false allegations of voter fraud having led to the January 6 United States Capitol attack and his second impeachment. In the last weeks of the Trump presidency, White House staff quit and aides resigned, thus leaving the proper preservation of records to the small number of assistants still in place after they left. A former Trump aide said they were "30 days behind what a typical administration would be". White House staff secretary Derek Lyons attempted to maintain an orderly preservation of records in the West Wing, but he departed the administration in late December, and White House chief of staff Mark Meadows and Trump took little interest in doing so, leaving the task to others. The Wall Street Journal quoted a former aide as saying: "If you only start packing with two days left to go, you're just running low on time. And if he's the one just throwing things in boxes, who knows what could happen?"

=== Archival of presidential records ===
The day before he left office, in a letter sent to Archivist of the United States David S. Ferriero, Trump designated seven senior Trump administration officials "as his representatives to handle all future requests for presidential records" including his chief of staff Mark Meadows, his White House Counsel Pat A. Cipollone, and Deputy White House Counsel Patrick F. Philbin. On June 19, 2022, Trump notified NARA that he had made former Trump administration official Kash Patel and journalist John Solomon his "representatives for access to Presidential records of my administration".

After Trump left the White House in 2021, NARA began an effort to retrieve documents covered under the Presidential Records Act that Trump had retained. This eventually turned into the FBI investigation into Donald Trump's handling of government documents after NARA discovered classified documents in the initial batch of 15 boxes they retrieved from Trump. After Trump certified he was returning all remaining government documents in accordance with a grand jury subpoena, the FBI obtained evidence that Trump still possessed documents and had intentionally hid them from his lawyers and the FBI. This led to a search by the Federal Bureau of Investigation (FBI), who executed a search warrant at Mar-a-Lago on August 8, 2022, and found thousands of documents including classified and national security related documents. As of August 2022, the FBI has retrieved hundreds of documents marked with some level of classification both before and as a result of the search warrant. In November 2022, the FBI investigation was taken over by the Smith special counsel investigation.

=== Indictment ===
On June 8, 2023, Trump was federally indicted on 37 charges related to documents he retained after leaving office. This was the first time a former U.S. president faced federal charges.

=== Missing binder ===
In December 2023, CNN reported that:

A binder containing highly classified information related to Russian election interference went missing at the end of Donald Trump’s presidency, raising alarms among intelligence officials that some of the most closely guarded national security secrets from the US and its allies could be exposed [...] In the two-plus years since Trump left office, the missing intelligence does not appear to have been found. The binder contained raw intelligence the US and its NATO allies collected on Russians and Russian agents, including sources and methods that informed the US government’s assessment that Russian President Vladimir Putin sought to help Trump win the 2016 election. [...]

According to the report, in the final days of his presidency, Donald Trump intended to declassify and release publicly multiple documents related to the FBI's Russia investigation. Several copies of the binder, with varying levels of redactions, ended up in the Justice Department and the National Archives, but an unredacted version went missing.

== See also ==
- 2017 electronics ban
- Agent handling
- FBI investigation into Donald Trump's handling of government documents
- Timeline of investigations into Donald Trump and Russia (January–June 2017)
- Timeline of investigations into Donald Trump and Russia (July–December 2017)
