= Orbital pass =

Event during which a spacecraft can be viewed from a specified ground location

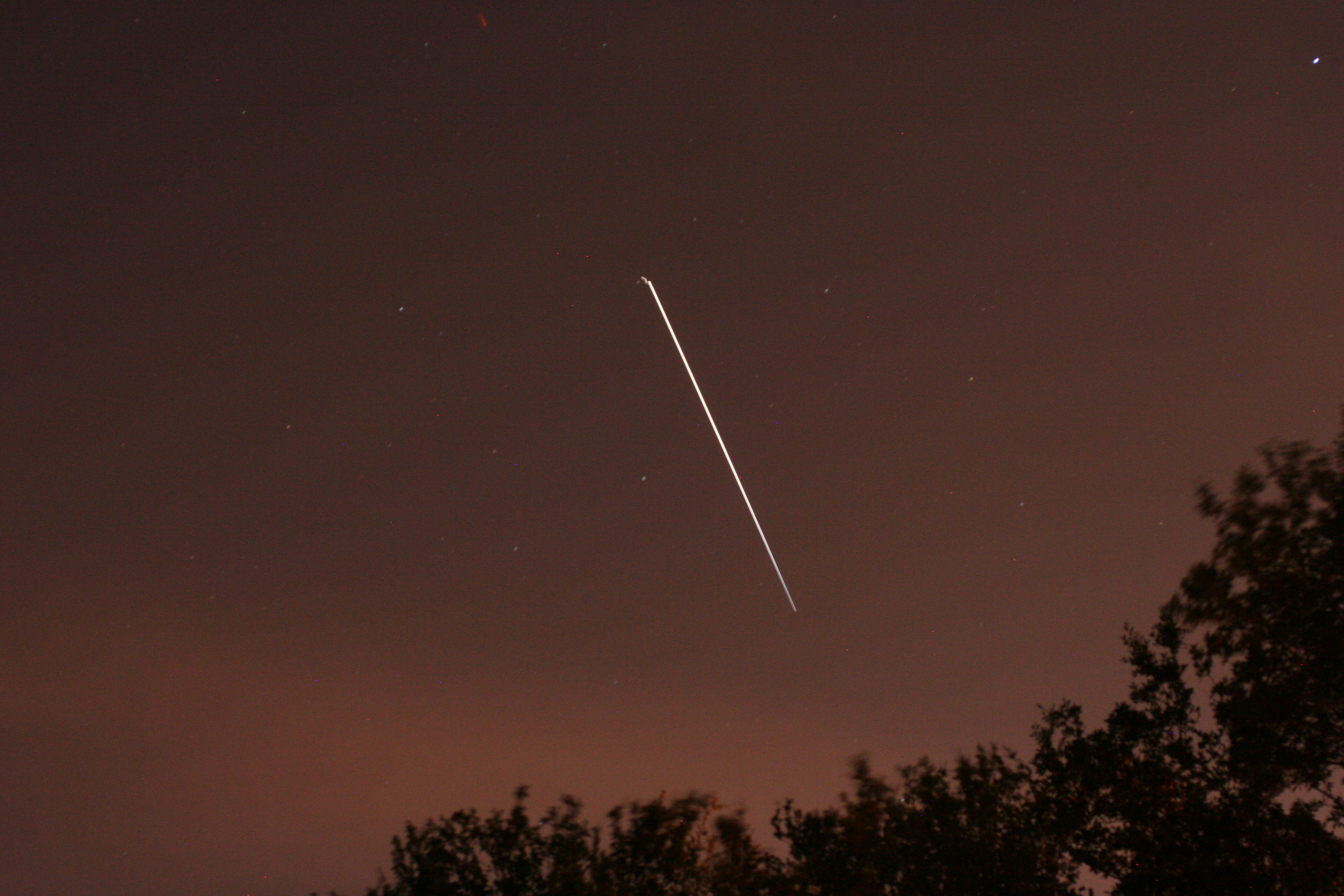
Visible pass of the International Space Station and Space Shuttle Atlantis over Tampa, Florida, on mission STS-132, May 18, 2010 (five-minute exposure)

An orbital pass (or simply pass) is the period in which a spacecraft is above the local horizon, and thus available for line-of-sight communication with a given ground station, receiver, or relay satellite, or for visual sighting. The beginning of a pass is termed acquisition of signal (AOS); the end of a pass is termed loss of signal (LOS). The point at which a spacecraft comes closest to a ground observer is the time of closest approach (TCA).

== Timing and duration ==
The timing and duration of passes depends on the characteristics of the orbit a satellite occupies, as well as the ground topography and any occulting objects on the ground (such as buildings), or in space (for planetary probes, or for spacecraft using relay satellites). The longest duration ground pass will be experienced by an observer directly on the ground track of the satellite. Path loss is greatest toward the start and end of a ground pass, as is Doppler shifting for Earth-orbiting satellites.

Satellites in geosynchronous orbit may be continuously visible from a single ground station, whereas satellites in low Earth orbit only offer short-duration ground passes (although longer contacts may be made via relay satellite networks such as TDRSS). Satellite constellations, such as those of satellite navigation systems, may be designed so that a minimum subset of the constellation is always visible from any point on the Earth, thereby providing continuous coverage.

== Prediction and visibility ==
A number of web-based and mobile applications produce predictions of passes for known satellites. In order to be observed with the naked eye, a spacecraft must reflect sunlight towards the observer; thus, naked-eye observations are generally restricted to twilight hours, during which the spacecraft is in sunlight but the observer is not. Nighttime observation is possible under specific circumstances such as a high beta angle. A satellite flare occurs when sunlight is reflected by flat surfaces on the spacecraft. The International Space Station, the largest artificial satellite of Earth, has a maximum apparent magnitude of –5.9, brighter than the planet Venus.

== See also ==
- Ground track, the path on the surface of the Earth directly below a satellite
- Satellite revisit period, the time elapsed between observations of the same point on Earth by a satellite
- Satellite watching, as a hobby
