= Operation Moonwatch =

Citizen science project

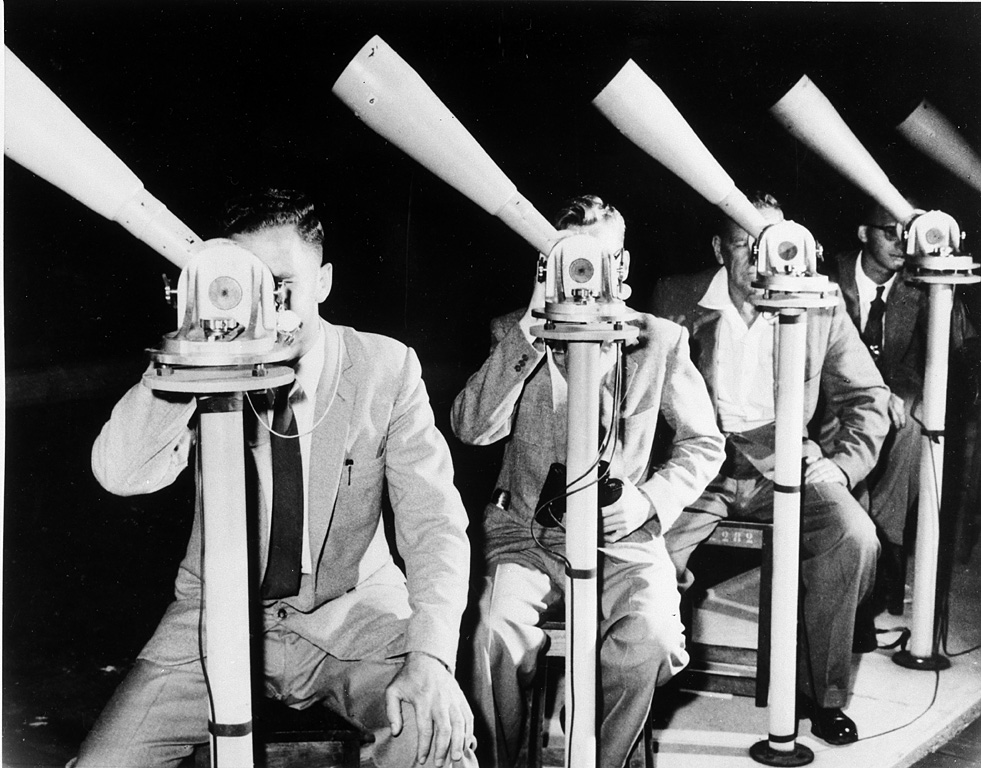
Volunteer satellite trackers in Pretoria, South Africa

Operation Moonwatch (also known as Project Moonwatch and, more simply, as Moonwatch) was an amateur science program formally initiated by the Smithsonian Astrophysical Observatory (SAO) in 1956. The SAO organized Moonwatch as part of the International Geophysical Year (IGY). Its initial goal was to enlist the aid of amateur astronomers and other citizens who would help professional scientists spot the first artificial satellites. Until professionally staffed optical tracking stations came on-line in 1958, this network of amateur scientists and other interested citizens played a critical role in providing crucial information regarding the world's first satellites.

== Origins of Moonwatch ==
Moonwatch's origins can be traced to two sources. In the United States, there was a thriving culture of amateur scientists including thousands of citizens who did astronomy for an avocation. During the Cold War, the United States also encouraged thousands of citizens to take part in the Ground Observer Corps, a nationwide program to spot Soviet bombers. Moonwatch brought together these two activities and attitudes, melding curiosity and vigilance into a thriving activity for citizens. Moonwatch, in other words, was an expression of 1950s popular culture and fixed properly within the context of the Cold War.

Moonwatch was the brainchild of Harvard astronomer Fred L. Whipple. In 1955, as the recently appointed director of the Smithsonian Astrophysical Observatory in Cambridge, Massachusetts, Whipple proposed that amateurs could play a vital role in efforts to track the first satellites. He overcame the objections of colleagues who doubted ordinary citizens could do the job or who wanted the task for their own institutions. Eventually, Whipple carved out a place for amateurs in the IGY.

== Moonwatch's members ==
In the late 1950s, thousands of teenagers, housewives, amateur astronomers, school teachers, and other citizens served on Moonwatch teams around the globe. Initially conceived as a way for citizens to participate in science and as a supplement to professionally staffed optical and radio tracking stations, Moonwatchers around the world found themselves an essential component of the professional scientists’ research program. Using specially designed telescopes, hand-built or purchased from vendors like Radio Shack, scores of Moonwatchers nightly monitored the skies. Their prompt response was aided by the extensive training they had done by spotting pebbles tossed in the air, registering the flight of moths, and participating in national alerts organized by the Civil Air Patrol.

Once professional scientists had accepted the idea that ordinary citizens could spot satellites and contribute to legitimate scientific research, Whipple and his colleagues organized amateurs around the world. Citizens formed Operation Moonwatch teams in towns and cities all around the globe, built their own equipment, and courted sponsors. In many cases, Moonwatch was not just a fad but an expression of real interest in science. By October 1957, Operation Moonwatch had some 200 teams ready to go into action, including observers in Hawaii and Australia.

== How Moonwatch worked ==
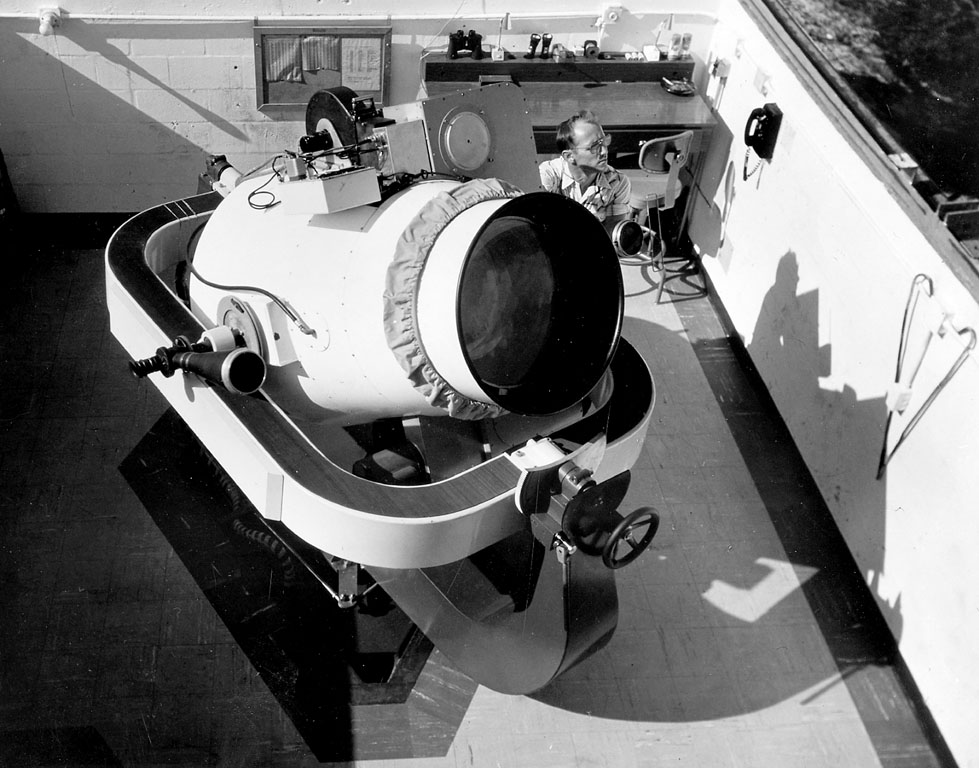
The Baker-Nunn satellite tracking camera.

Whipple envisioned a global network of specially designed instruments that could track and photograph satellites. This network, aided by a corps of volunteer satellite spotters and a computer at the MIT Computation Center, would establish ephemerides – predictions of where a satellite will be at particular times. The instruments at these stations were eventually designed by Dr. James G. Baker and Joseph Nunn and hence known as Baker-Nunn cameras. Based on a series of super-Schmidt wide-angle telescopes and strategically placed around the globe at 12 locations, the innovative cameras could track rapidly moving targets while simultaneously viewing large swaths of the sky. From the start, Whipple planned that the professionally staffed Baker-Nunn stations would be complemented by teams of dedicated amateurs. Amateur satellite spotters would inform the Baker-Nunn stations as to where to look, an important task given that scientists working on the Vanguard program likened finding a satellite in the sky to finding a golf ball tossed out of a jet plane. Amateur teams would relay the information back to the SAO in Cambridge where professional scientists would use it to generate accurate satellite orbits. At this point, professionals at the Baker-Nunn stations would take over the full-time task of photographing them.

== During the IGY ==
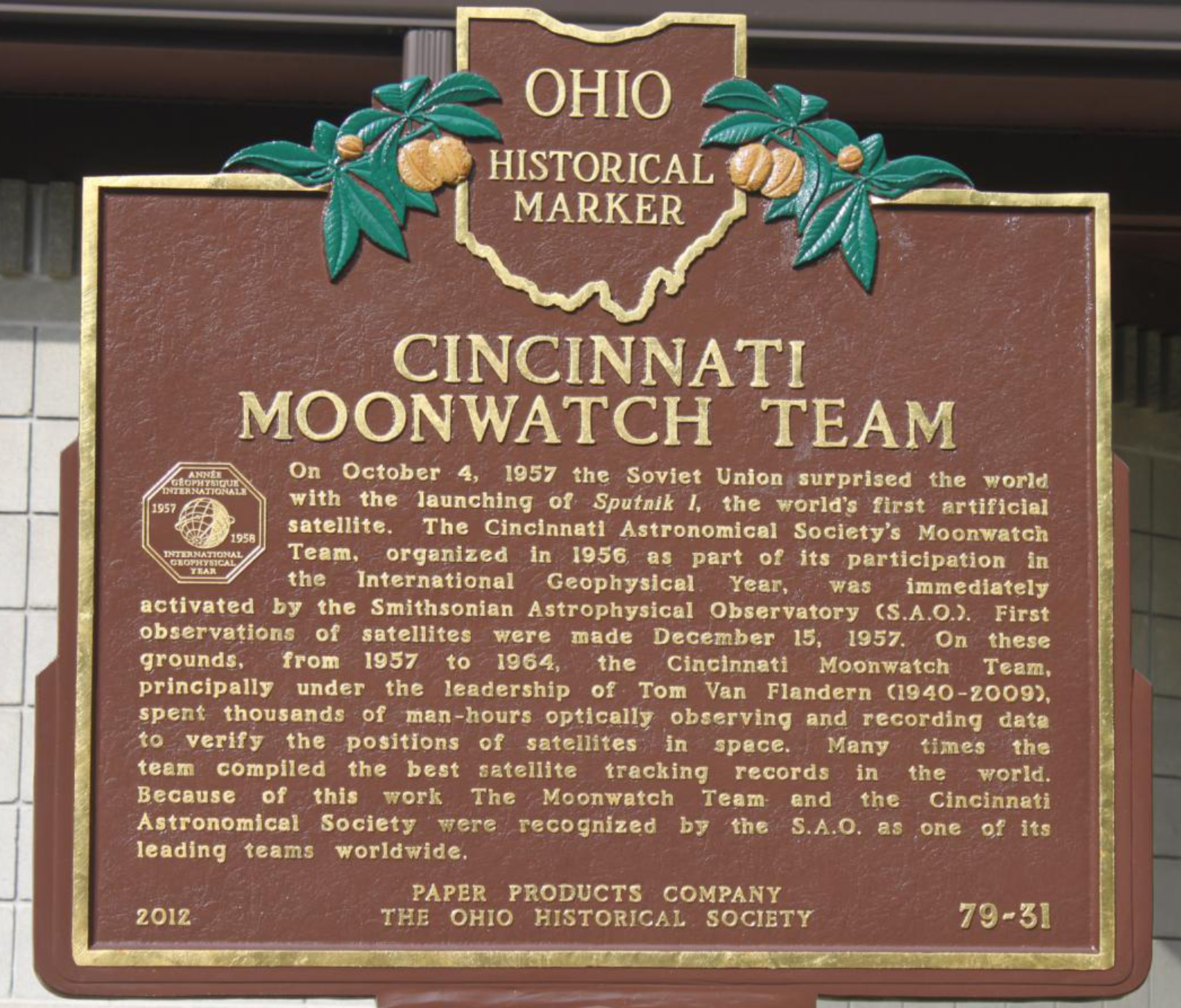
Historic marker for the Cincinnati, Ohio team

Sputnik 1's sudden launch was followed less than a month later with the Soviets orbiting Sputnik 2 and the dog Laika. It was Moonwatch teams, networked around the world, who provided tracking information needed by scientists in Western nations. For the opening months of the Space Age, members of Moonwatch were the only organized worldwide network that was prepared to spot and help track satellites. The information they provided was complemented by the radio tracking program called Minitrack the United States Navy operated as well as some information from amateur radio buffs.

In many cases, Moonwatch teams also had the responsibility of communicating news of Sputnik and the first American satellites to the public. The public responded, in turn, with infectious enthusiasm as local radio stations aired times to spot satellites and local and national newspapers ran hundreds of articles that described the nighttime activities of Moonwatchers.

Moonwatch caught the attention of those citizens interested in science or the Space Race during the late 1950s and much of the general public as well. Newspapers and popular magazines featured stories about Moonwatch regularly; dozens of articles appeared in the Los Angeles Times, The New Yorker, and the New York Times alone. Meanwhile, in the U.S. local businesses sponsored teams with monikers like Spacehounds and The Order of Lunartiks. Meanwhile, Moonwatch teams in Peru, Japan, Australia, and even the Arctic regularly sent their observations to the Smithsonian.

Moonwatch complemented the professional system of satellite tracking stations that Fred Whipple organized around the globe. These two networks – one composed of amateurs and the other of seasoned professionals – helped further Whipple's personal goals of expanding his own astronomical empire. Operation Moonwatch was the most successful amateur activity of the IGY and it became the public face of a satellite tracking network that expanded the Smithsonian's global reach. Whipple used satellite tracking as a gateway for his observatory to participate in new research opportunities that appeared in the early years of space exploration.

In February 1958, President Dwight D. Eisenhower publicly thanked the SAO, Fred Whipple, and the global corps of satellite spotters that comprised Moonwatch for their efforts in tracking the first Soviet and American satellites.

== Moonwatch after the IGY ==
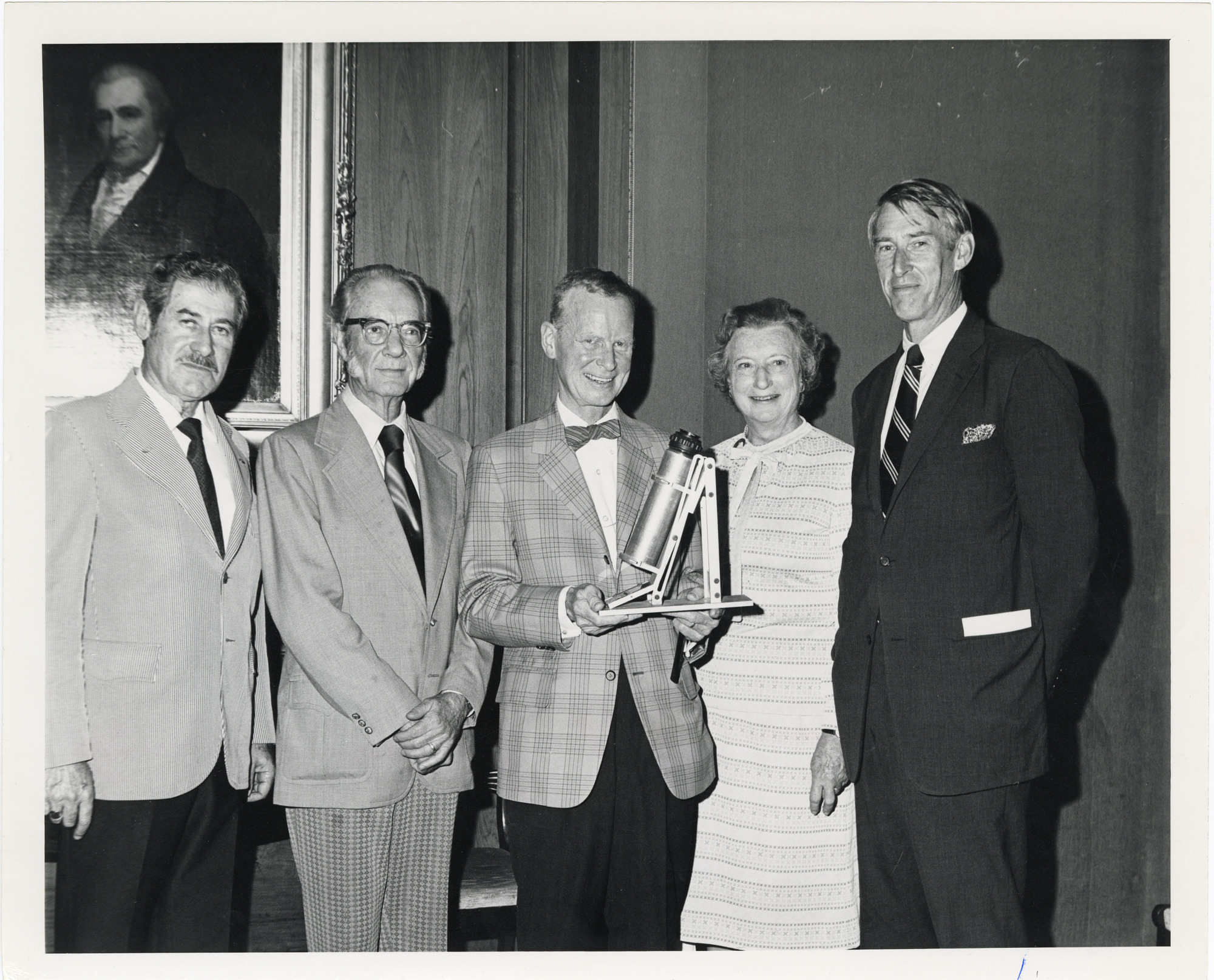
End of Operation Moonwatch Observed at SAO Luncheon. From left: Albert Werner, Fred Whipple, Frederick C. Durant III, Mrs. Grace Spitz, and David Challinor (1975)

Even after the IGY ended, the Smithsonian maintained Operation Moonwatch. Hundreds of dedicated amateur scientists continued to help NASA and other agencies track satellites. Their observations often rivaled those of professional tracking stations, blurring the boundary between professional and amateur. Moonwatch members and the Smithsonian were important contributors to US Department of Defense satellite tracking research and development efforts, 1957–1961; see Project Space Track.

Moonwatch continued long after the IGY ended in 1958. In fact, the Smithsonian operated Moonwatch until 1975 making it one of the longest running amateur science activities ever. As the fad of satellite spotting passed, the Smithsonian refashioned Operation Moonwatch to perform new functions. It encouraged teams of dedicated amateurs to contribute increasingly precise data for satellite tracking. Moonwatchers adapted to the needs of the Smithsonian through the activities of "hard core" groups in places like Walnut Creek, California. Throughout the 1960s, the Smithsonian gave them ever more challenging assignments such as locating extremely faint satellites and tracking satellites as they re-entered the Earth's atmosphere. At times, the precise observations and calculations of dedicated skywatchers surpasses the work of professionals.

One of the most notable activities of Moonwatchers after the IGY was the observance of Sputnik 4 when it reentered the atmosphere in September 1962. Moonwatchers and other amateur scientists near Milwaukee, Wisconsin observed the flaming re-entry and their observations eventually led to the recovery and analysis of several fragments from the Soviet satellite.

== Moonwatch's legacy ==
Moonwatch affected the lives of participants long after they stopped looking for satellites. When the Smithsonian discontinued the program in 1975, one long-time Moonwatcher compared his participation to "winning the Medal of Honor." Moonwatch inspired some future scientists, for example, James A. Westphal, a Moonwatcher from Oklahoma, who eventually helped design instruments for the Hubble Space Telescope at Caltech. The program boosted science programs at many schools throughout the country and helped revitalize amateur science in the United States.

The United States Space Surveillance Network and other modern tracking systems are professional and automated, but amateurs remain active in satellite watching.
