= MIT Computation Center =

Computing resources program

The MIT Computation Center was organized in 1956 as a 10-year joint venture between the Massachusetts Institute of Technology and IBM to provide computing resources for New England universities. As part of the venture, IBM installed an IBM 704, which remained at MIT until 1960.

== Operation Moonwatch ==
After the successful launch of Sputnik on October 4, 1957, the race was on to calculate and predict where the first man-made satellites would appear in the sky. Fred Lawrence Whipple, then director of the Smithsonian Astrophysical Observatory (SAO) in Cambridge, Massachusetts, had gathered amateur astronomers to track artificial satellites in an organization called Operation Moonwatch. The aim was to get the position of the satellite in order to obtain its orbital elements. The first "satisfactory orbit" calculated by the IBM 704 as official tracker for the SAO occurred at 7AM on October 11, 1957.
