= Revise =

Revise or revised may refer to:

== Bibles ==
- Revised Version of the King James Bible
  - New Revised Standard Version of the King James Bible

== Government and law ==
- Revised Penal Code of the Philippines
- Revised Statutes of the United States

== Other uses ==
- Revised Julian calendar
- Revised New General Catalogue, an astronomy catalog
- Revised Romanization of Korean

== See also ==
- Revisable-Form Text
- Revision (disambiguation)
