= USA-186 =

American reconnaissance satellite

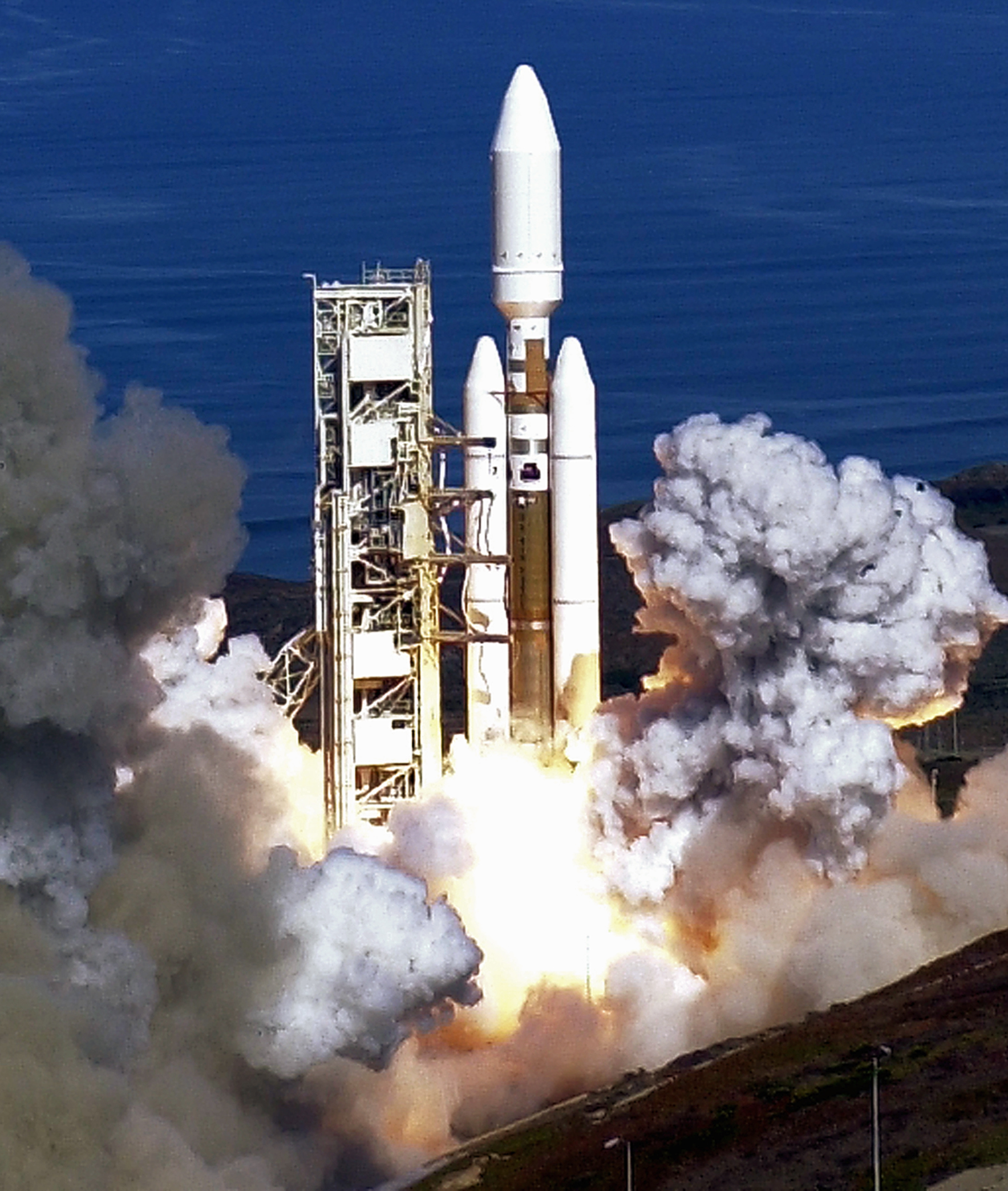
- Launch of USA-186
- Mission type: Optical imaging
- Operator: NRO
- COSPAR ID: 2005-042A
- SATCAT no.: 28888

Spacecraft properties
- Spacecraft type: KH-11
- Manufacturer: Lockheed Martin

Start of mission
- Launch date: 19 October 2005 18:05 UTC
- Rocket: Titan IV (404)B (B-26)
- Launch site: Vandenberg, SLC-4E
- Contractor: Lockheed Martin

Orbital parameters
- Reference system: Geocentric orbit
- Regime: Sun-synchronous orbit
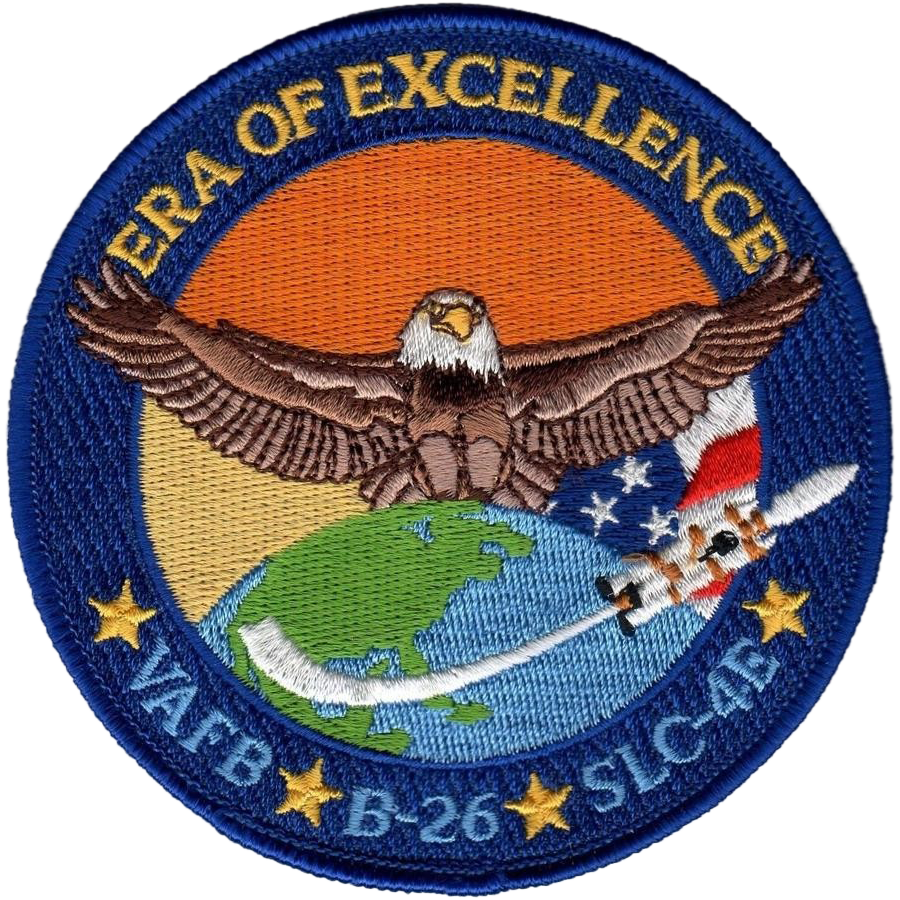
- KH-11 Series

USA-186 (also known as KH-11 14 and NROL-20) is an American reconnaissance satellite which is operated by the National Reconnaissance Office. Launched in October 2005, it is the first KH-11 Block 4 reconnaissance satellite.

== Overview ==
The satellite launched as the last Titan IV launch and is last Titan rocket launch, ending its many decades of service to US National Security missions. Future KH-11 missions will be launched on the Delta IV Heavy rocket.

KH-11 KENNEN, also called Crystal, is an electro-optical reconnaissance satellite which replaced the film-return satellites like KH-9 HEXAGON.

== See also ==
- List of USA satellites
- List of NRO Launches
