= USA-224 =

US spy satellite

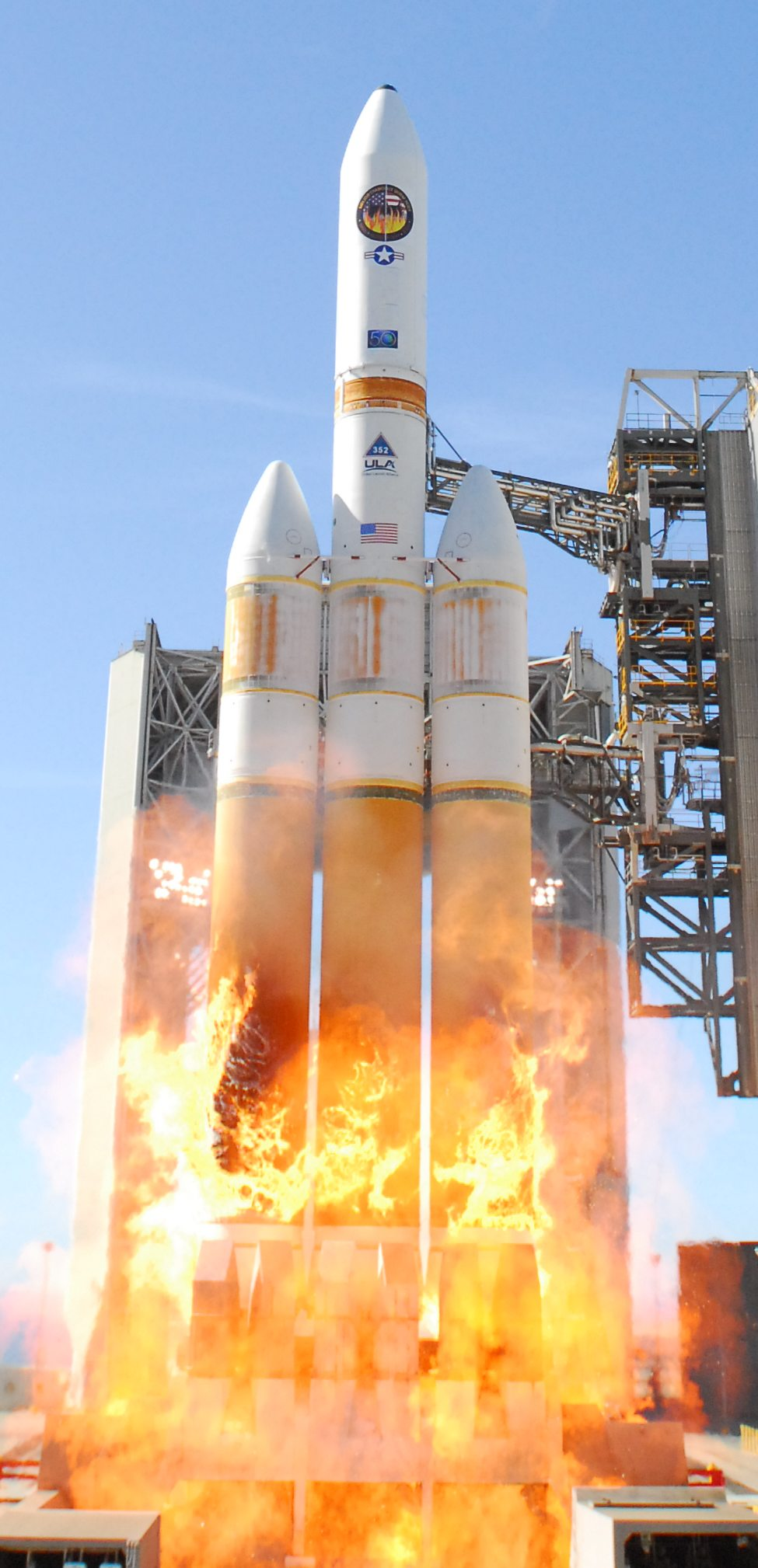
- Launch of USA-224
- Mission type: Optical imaging
- Operator: US NRO
- COSPAR ID: 2011-002A
- SATCAT no.: 37348

Spacecraft properties
- Spacecraft type: KH-11
- Manufacturer: Lockheed Martin

Start of mission
- Launch date: 20 January 2011, 21:10:30 UTC
- Rocket: Delta IV Heavy D352
- Launch site: Vandenberg SLC-6

Orbital parameters
- Reference system: Geocentric
- Regime: Low Earth
- Perigee altitude: 270 kilometers (170 mi)
- Apogee altitude: 986 kilometers (613 mi)
- Inclination: 97.92 degrees
- Period: 97.13 minutes
- Epoch: 5 August 2014, 00:12:52 UTC
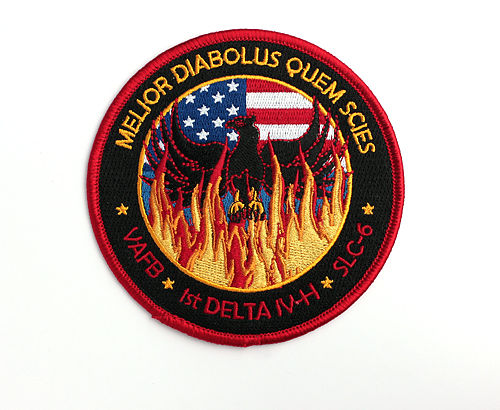

USA-224, also known as NROL-49, is an American reconnaissance satellite. Launched in 2011 to replace the decade-old USA-161 satellite, it is the fifteenth KH-11 optical imaging satellite to reach orbit.

== Project history and cost ==
After the Boeing-led Future Imagery Architecture program failed in 2005, the National Reconnaissance Office ordered two more KH-11s. Critics worried that each of these "exquisite-class" satellites would cost more than the Navy's latest aircraft carrier (US$6.35 billion in 2005, or about $10,470,000,000 today). Instead, USA-224–the first of these two–was completed by Lockheed $2 billion under the initial budget estimate and two years ahead of schedule.

== Launch ==
USA-224 was launched atop a Delta IV Heavy rocket from Vandenberg AFB Space Launch Complex 6 in California. The launch was conducted by United Launch Alliance, and was the first flight of a Delta IV Heavy from Vandenberg. Liftoff occurred on 20 January 2011 at 21:10:30 UTC. Upon reaching orbit, the satellite received the International Designator 2011-002A.

The satellite began operating 33 days after its predecessor, USA-161, stopped doing its primary mission. This coverage gap was much smaller than originally feared, thanks to USA-224's earlier-than-planned launch and operational changes to extend the lifetime of USA-161.

As the fifteenth KH-11 satellite to be launched, USA-224 is a member of one of the later block configurations occasionally identified as being a separate system. Details of its mission and orbit are classified, but amateur observers have tracked it in low Earth orbit. Shortly after launch it was in an orbit with a perigee of 251 kilometres (156 mi), an apogee of 1,023 kilometres (636 mi) and 97.9 degrees of inclination, typical for an operational KH-11 satellite. By April it was 260 by 987 kilometres (162 by 613 mi) at 97.93 degrees.

== Imaging of Safir launch preparation accident ==
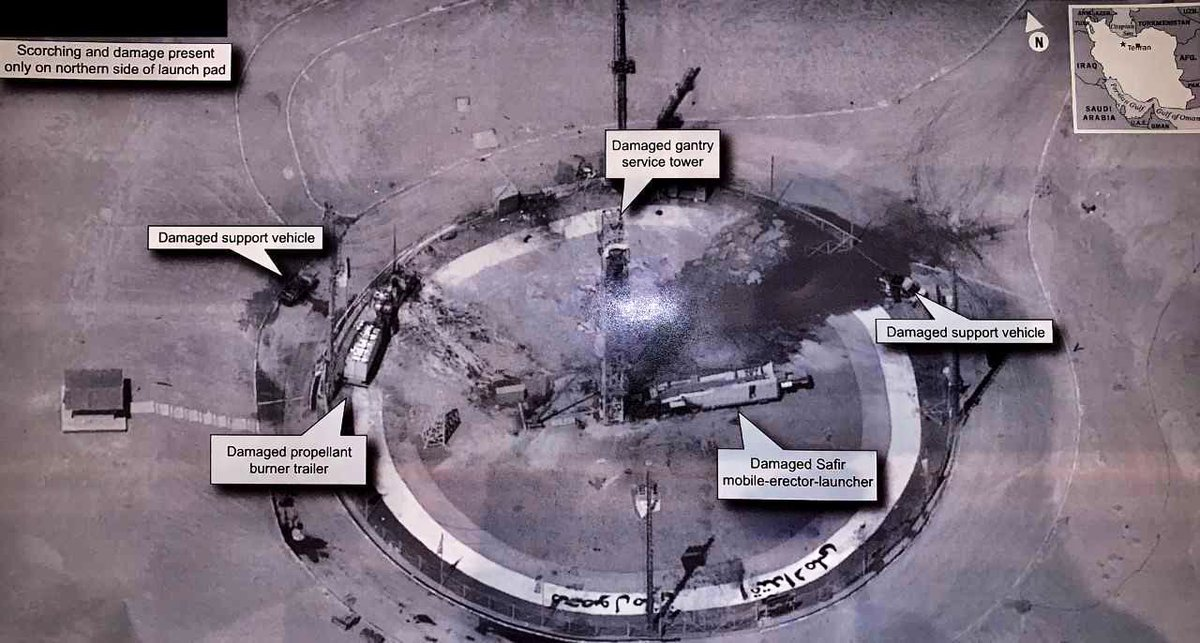
The photo believed to have been taken by USA-224 tweeted by President Trump in August 2019

The original GEOINT product given to Trump, declassified by the National Geospatial-Intelligence Agency in November 2022

On 30 August 2019, President Donald Trump tweeted a classified picture from an intelligence briefing showing the aftermath of an accident that apparently occurred during launch preparations of a Safir rocket at the Imam Khomeini Spaceport a day earlier. According to analysts, the photo is likely to have been taken by USA-224. The opinion is based on a close agreement between the estimated time when the photo was taken (based on the orientation of shadows cast by structures in the photo), and the location of the satellite at that same time, as estimated with tracking data maintained by the amateur satellite watching community. The off-nadir photograph stands out for its high-resolution (estimated by analysts to be 10 cm or less per pixel), sharpness and lack of atmospheric distortion. Before this tweet, the only KH-11 imagery available was leaked in 1984, and the only declassified imagery available in public domain was released in 2011 taken by KH-9.

== See also ==
- List of NRO launches
- 2011 in spaceflight
