= Satellite revisit period =

How often a satellite passes the same point in orbit

The satellite revisit period is the time elapsed between observations of the same point on Earth by a satellite. It depends on the satellite's orbit, target location, and swath of the sensor.

"Revisit" is related to the same ground trace, a projection of the satellite's orbit on to the Earth. Revisit requires a very close repeat of the ground trace. In the case of polar orbit or highly inclined low-Earth-orbit reconnaissance satellites, the sensor must have the variable swath, to look longitudinally (east-west, or sideways) at a target, in addition to direct overflight observation, looking nadir.

In the case of the Israeli EROS Earth observation satellite, the ground trace repeat is 15 days, but the actual revisit time is 3 days, because of the swath ability of the camera payload.

== See also ==
- Orbit period
- Satellite watching, spotting satellites in the sky as they pass
