= Final Articles Revision Convention =

Final Articles Revision Convention may refer to either of two International Labour Organization conventions:

- Final Articles Revision Convention, 1946
- Final Articles Revision Convention, 1961
