= Revisionism =

Revisionism may refer to:

- Historical revisionism, the critical re-examination of presumed historical facts and existing historiography
  - The "revisionists" school of thought in Soviet and Communist studies, as opposed to the Cold War "traditionalists" school
  - Historical negationism, concerted denial of claims accepted by mainstream historians, may purport to be historical revisionism but its methodologies have no basis in historiography/profession of history
  - Revisionist school of Islamic studies, which questions whether the traditional accounts about Islam's early times are reliable historical sources
- Fictional revisionism, the retelling of a story with substantial alterations in character or environment, to "revise" the view shown in the original work
- Marxist revisionism, a pejorative term used by some Marxists to describe ideas based on a revision of fundamental Marxist premises
- Revisionism (Ireland), an issue in Irish historiography
- Revisionism (Spain), a derogatory term used in Spanish historiographic debate
- Revisionism theory, another word for reformism
- Revisionist Zionism, a nationalist faction within the Zionist movement
- Territorial revisionism, a euphemism for revanchism or irredentism
- The reevaluation of one's experiences with a hindsight bias

== See also ==
- Anti-revisionism, a concept in Marxism
- Censorship
- Revision (disambiguation)
- Revisionist state, a term from international relations
