= Revision =

Revision is the process of modifying and the resulting artifact.

More specifically, it may refer to:

- Patch (computing), a relatively small modification to a computing resource such as software or file, revision (a.k.a. update) refers to any computing resource modification
- re:VISION, the debut EP of Ninomae Ina'nis
- Revision control, the management of changes to sets of computer files
- ReVisions, a 2004 anthology of alternate history short stories
- Revision3, a San Francisco-based Internet television network
- Revision (Boxcar album) a remix music album by synthpop group Boxcar
- Revisions (album), an album by the band 3
- Revision (demoparty), a demoparty which takes place on Easter in Saarbrücken, Germany
- "Revisions" (Stargate SG-1), an episode of the Stargate SG-1 science-fiction television series
- Revisions (anime) a 2019 anime television series
- Final Articles Revision Convention (disambiguation), either of two International Labour Organisation conventions
- Revision or revising, a British term for exam preparation
- Taxonomic revision is a novel analysis of the variation patterns in a particular taxon
- Revision (writing), the general process of revising written work, or a version produced by that process

== See also ==
- Revisionism (disambiguation)
