= KH-11 KENNEN =

Type of American spy satellite

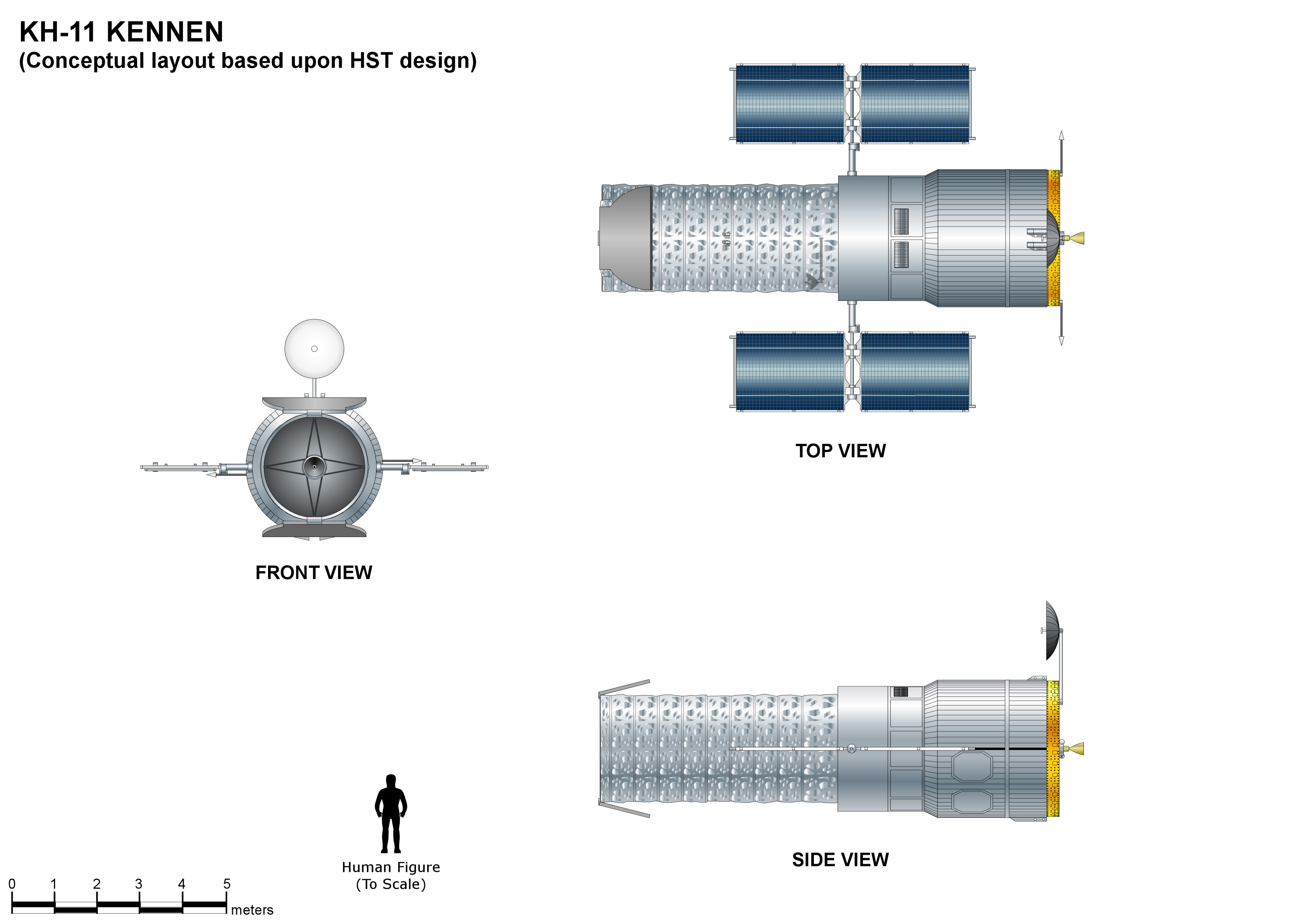
A conceptual drawing based upon Hubble Space Telescope (HST) layout.

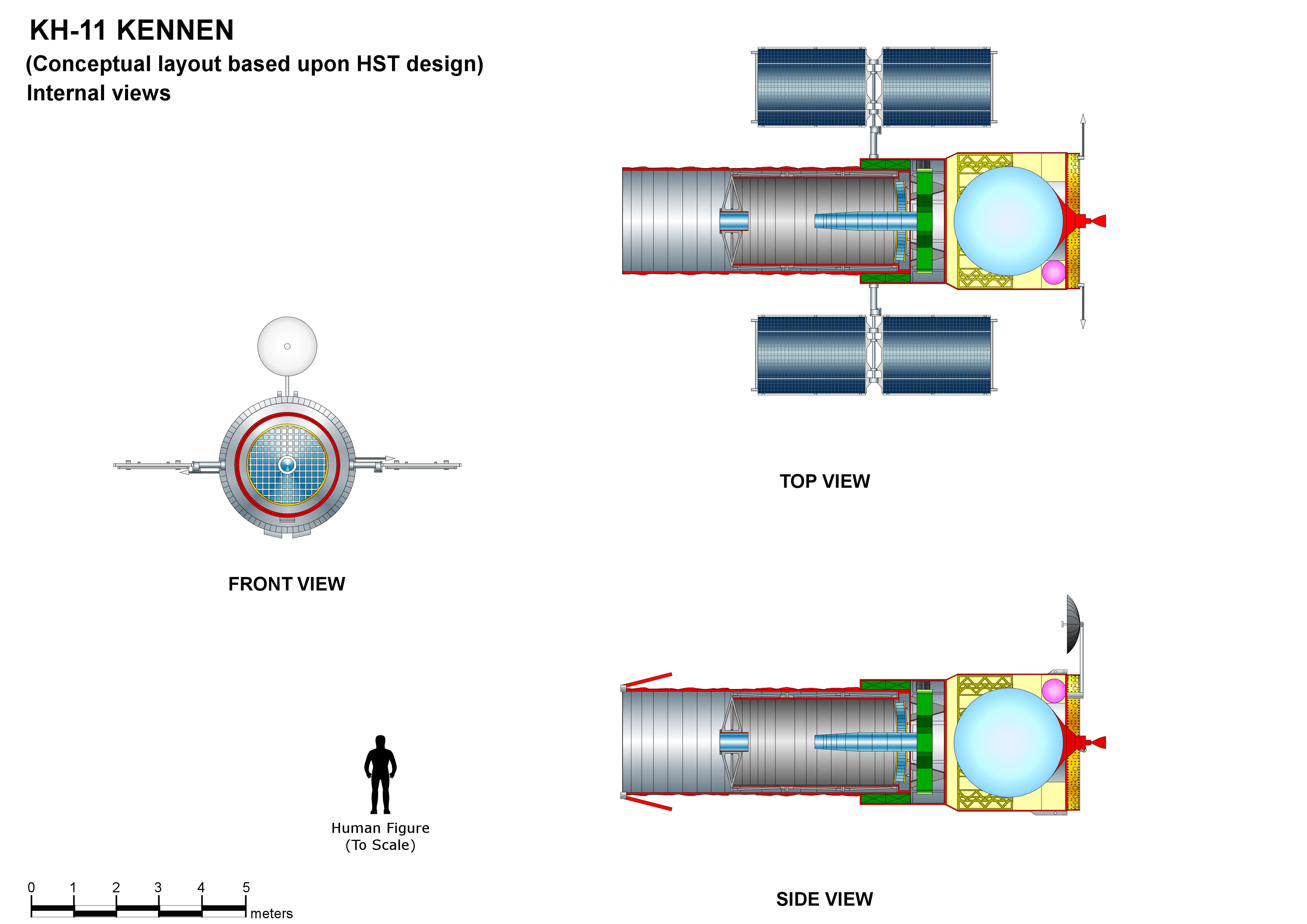
A conceptual drawing based upon Hubble Space Telescope (HST) layout with internal views.

The KH-11 KENNEN (later renamed CRYSTAL, then Evolved Enhanced CRYSTAL System, and codenamed 1010 and Key Hole) is a type of reconnaissance satellite first launched by the American National Reconnaissance Office (NRO) in December 1976. Manufactured by Lockheed in Sunnyvale, California, the KH-11 was the first American spy satellite to use electro-optical digital imaging, and to offer real-time optical observations.

Later KH-11 satellites have been referred to by outside observers as KH-11B or KH-12, and by the names "Advanced KENNEN", "Improved Crystal" and "Ikon". Official budget documents refer to the latest generation of electro-optical satellites as Evolved Enhanced CRYSTAL System. The Key Hole series was officially discontinued in favor of a random numbering scheme after repeated public references to KH-7 GAMBIT, KH-8 GAMBIT 3, KH-9 HEXAGON, and KH-11 KENNEN satellites.

The capabilities of the KH-11 are highly classified, as are the images they produce. The satellites are believed to have been the source of some imagery of the Soviet Union and China made public in 1997; images of Sudan and Afghanistan made public in 1998 related to the response to the 1998 U.S. embassy bombings; and a 2019 photo, provided by then-President Donald Trump, of a failed Iranian rocket launch.

== Program history ==
Before KENNEN, National Reconnaissance Office spy satellites such as KH-9 HEXAGON took photographs on film, which was dropped to Earth in capsules. The satellites' useful life ended when they ran out of film or capsules.

The Film Read-Out KH-7 GAMBIT (FROG) served as NRO Program A's competitor to NRO Program B's initial electro-optical imagery (EOI) satellite. After a precursor EOI study under the codeword Zoster, President Nixon on 23 September 1971 approved the development of an EOI satellite codenamed Zaman. In November 1971, this codeword was changed to Kennen, which is Middle English for "to perceive". Initial director of the ZAMAN/KENNEN Program Group was Charles R. "Charlie" Roth; he was succeeded in October 1975 by Rutledge P. (Hap) Hazzard.

The KENNEN system transmits its imagery as data through the Satellite Data System (SDS), a network of communications satellites. These digital images were initially processed at a secret National Reconnaissance Office facility dubbed Area 58 at Fort Belvoir in Virginia.

In 1999, NRO selected Boeing as the prime contractor for the Future Imagery Architecture (FIA) program, which aimed to replace the KH-11 satellites by a more cost-effective constellation of smaller, more capable reconnaissance satellites. After the failure of the FIA in 2005, NRO ordered two more KH-11s from Lockheed. USA-224, the first of these, was launched in early 2011 two years ahead of the initial schedule estimate.

== Design ==
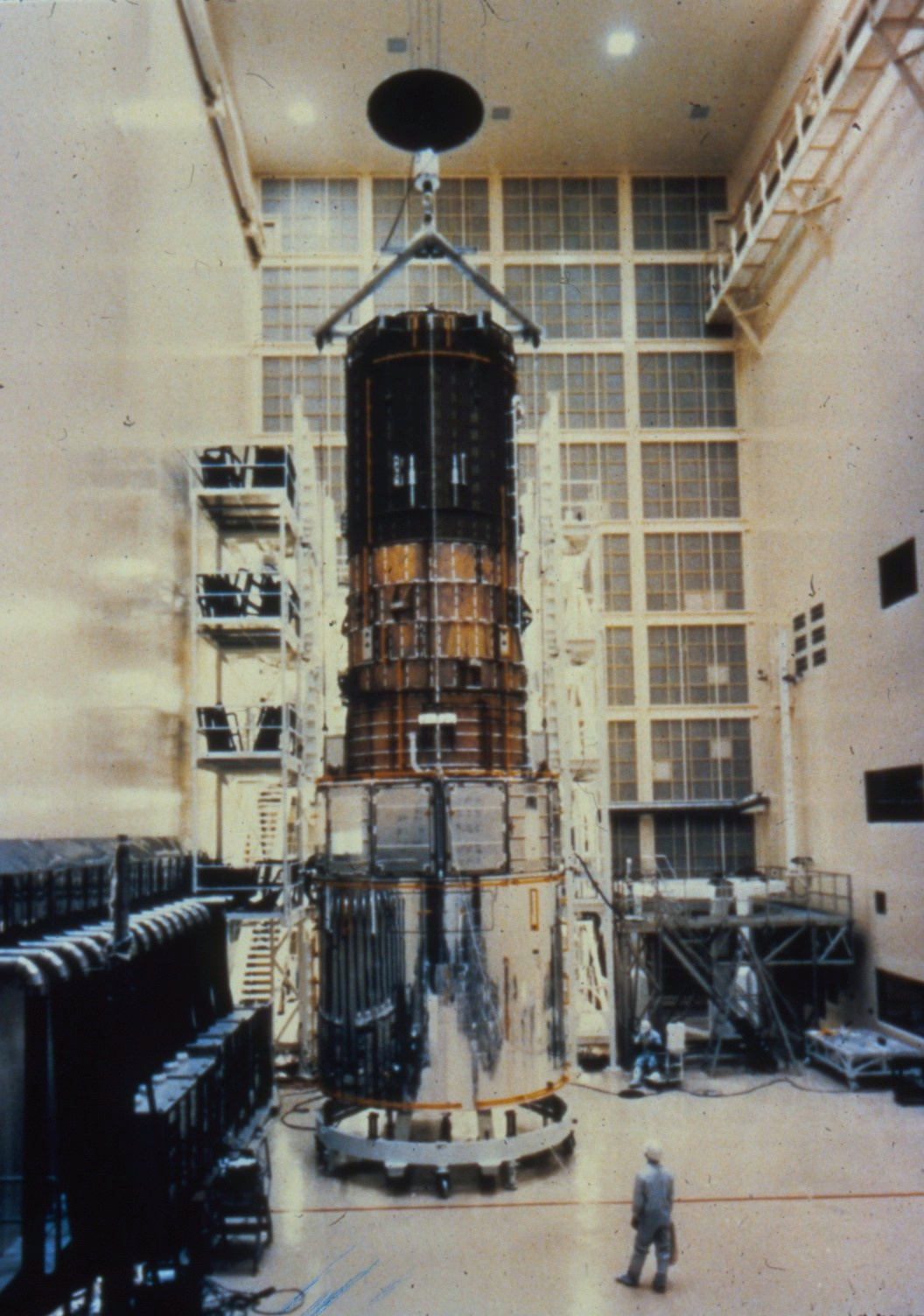
The Hubble Space Telescope integration at Lockheed.

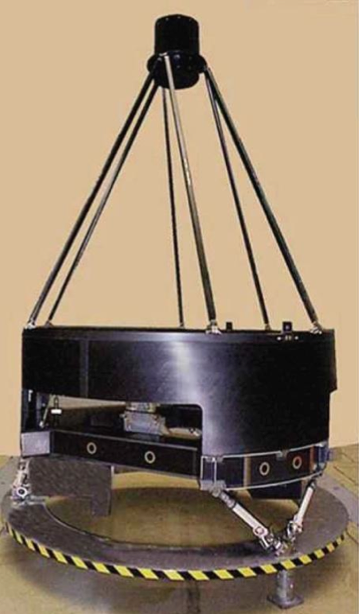
A Dynamical Test Unit of KH-11 (unconfirmed) Three Mirror Assembly.

=== Initial design specifications ===
According to Lew Allen, the initial key design elements were specified by Edwin H. Land. They included i) solid state focal plane array, ii) integrated circuits for complex data processing, iii) large, fast optics with a 2.54 m (100 in) diameter f/2 primary mirror, iv) gigabit/s data link, v) long on-orbit operational lifetime for the imaging satellites, and vi) communication satellites to facilitate close-to-realtime downlink of the images.

=== Size and mass ===
KH-11s are believed to resemble the Hubble Space Telescope in size and shape, as they were shipped in similar containers. Their length is believed to be 19.5 meters, with a diameter of up to 3 meters (120 in). A NASA history of the Hubble, in discussing the reasons for switching from a 3-meter main mirror to a 2.4-meter (94 in) design, states: "In addition, changing to a 2.4-meter mirror would lessen fabrication costs by using manufacturing technologies developed for military spy satellites".

Different versions of the KH-11 vary in mass. Early KH-11s were reported to be comparable in mass to HEXAGON, i.e. about 12,000 kg (26,000 lb). Later blocks are believed to have a mass of around 17,000 kg (37,000 lb) to 19,600 kg (43,200 lb).

=== Propulsion module ===
It has been reported that KH-11s are equipped with a hydrazine-powered propulsion system for orbital adjustments. In order to increase the orbital lifetime of KH-11s, plans existed for refuelling the propulsion module during service visits by the Space Shuttle. It has been speculated that the propulsion module is related to Lockheed's Satellite Support Bus (SSB), which had been derived from the Satellite Control Section (SCS) developed by Lockheed for KH-9.

=== Optical Telescope Assembly ===
A CIA history states that the primary mirror on the first KH-11s measured 2.34 meters (92 in), but sizes increased in later versions. NRO led the development of a computer controlled mirror polishing technique, which was subsequently also used for the polishing of the primary mirror of the Hubble Space Telescope.

Later satellites had larger mirrors, with a diameter of around 2.9 to 3.1 meters (110 to 120 in). Jane's Defence Weekly indicates that the secondary mirror in the Cassegrain reflecting telescope system could be moved, allowing images to be taken from angles unusual for a satellite. Also, there are indications that the satellite can take images every five seconds.

=== Imaging sensors and camera modes ===
The initial KH-11 camera system offered frame and strip modes. The focal plane was equipped with an array of light-sensitive silicon diodes, which converted brightness values to electrical signals. The packaging density was sufficiently high (several hundred diodes per inch) to match the ground sample distance of the CORONA satellites. The recorded digital signal was encrypted and transmitted to a ground station in near real time, and written to film by means of a laser in order to recreate the recorded image. The first charge-coupled device (CCD) detectors for KH-11 were developed by Westinghouse Electric Corporation at their Baltimore facility in the later 1970s. KH-11 Block II might have been the first reconnaissance satellite equipped for imaging with an 800 × 800 pixels CCD. Later block satellites may include signals intelligence capabilities and greater sensitivity in broader light spectrums (probably into infrared).

=== Communications ===
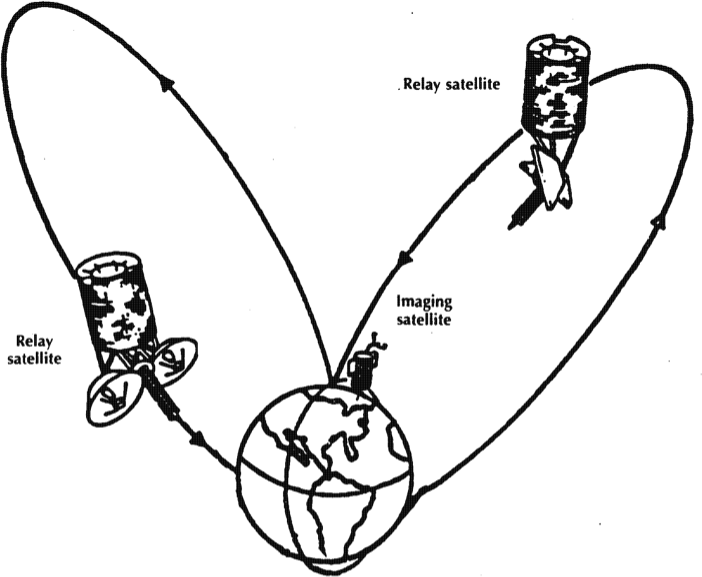
KENNEN Initial Configuration with 1 imaging and 2 relay satellites (January 1977)

Communication to and data downloads from KH-11 satellites are routed through a constellation of communication relay satellites in higher orbits. The initial communications relay payload is believed to have operated at a frequency of 60 GHz, as radio emission at this frequency is blocked by Earth's atmosphere, and thus not detectable from the ground. Launch of the initial two Satellite Data System satellites occurred in June and August 1976, i.e. ahead of the first launch of a KH-11 satellite in late 1976. One of the initial on-orbit challenges were failures of the Traveling-wave tubes, which amplified the communications signals sent from the imaging satellite to the relay satellites, and from the relay satellites to the ground stations. During crossings of the ionosphere, ions could build up on the outside of the tubes, which were operated at 14,000 volts. This resulted in repeated sparking and deposition of carbon traces inside the tubes, ultimately shorting them out. The issue could be abated by changing the orbiting satellite's orientation during crossing of the ionosphere, and was finally solved by better shielding of the tubes in follow-up satellites. Ground stations for the receipt of KH-11 data have been reported to be located in Fort Belvoir, VA, the former Buckley Air National Guard Base, CO, and Kapaun Air Station, Germany.

=== Resolution and ground sample distance ===
A perfect 2.4-meter (94 in) mirror observing in the visual spectrum (i.e. at a wavelength of 500 nm) has a diffraction limited resolution of around 0.05 arcsec, which from an orbital altitude of 250 km (160 mi) corresponds to a ground sample distance of 6 cm (2.4 in). Operational resolution should be worse due to effects of the atmospheric turbulence. Astronomer Clifford Stoll estimates that such a telescope could resolve up to "a couple inches. Not quite good enough to recognize a face".

=== KH-11 generations ===
Five generations of U.S. electro-optical reconnaissance have been identified:

==== Block I ====
Block I refer to the original KH-11 satellite, of which five were launched between 19 December 1976 and 17 November 1982.

==== Block II ====
The three Block II satellites are in the open literature referred to as KH-11B, the alleged DRAGON codename, or CRYSTAL, and are believed to be capable of taking infrared images in addition to optical observations. The first or second Block II satellite was lost in a launch failure.

==== Block III ====
Four Block III satellites, commonly called KH-12 or Improved CRYSTAL were launched between November 1992 and October 2001. The name "Improved CRYSTAL" refers to the "Improved Metric CRYSTAL System" (IMCS). Metric describes the capability to fix Datum references (markings) in an image relative to the World Geodetic System for mapping purposes. Another improvement was an eightfold increase in the download rate compared to earlier models to facilitate improved real-time access and increased area coverage. From Block III on, the typical lifetime of the satellites increased to about 15 years, possibly related to a higher lift-off mass, which facilitates larger fuel reserves for countering atmospheric drag.

==== Block IV ====
Three electro-optical satellites launched in October 2005, January 2011, and August 2013 are attributed to Block IV.

==== Block V ====
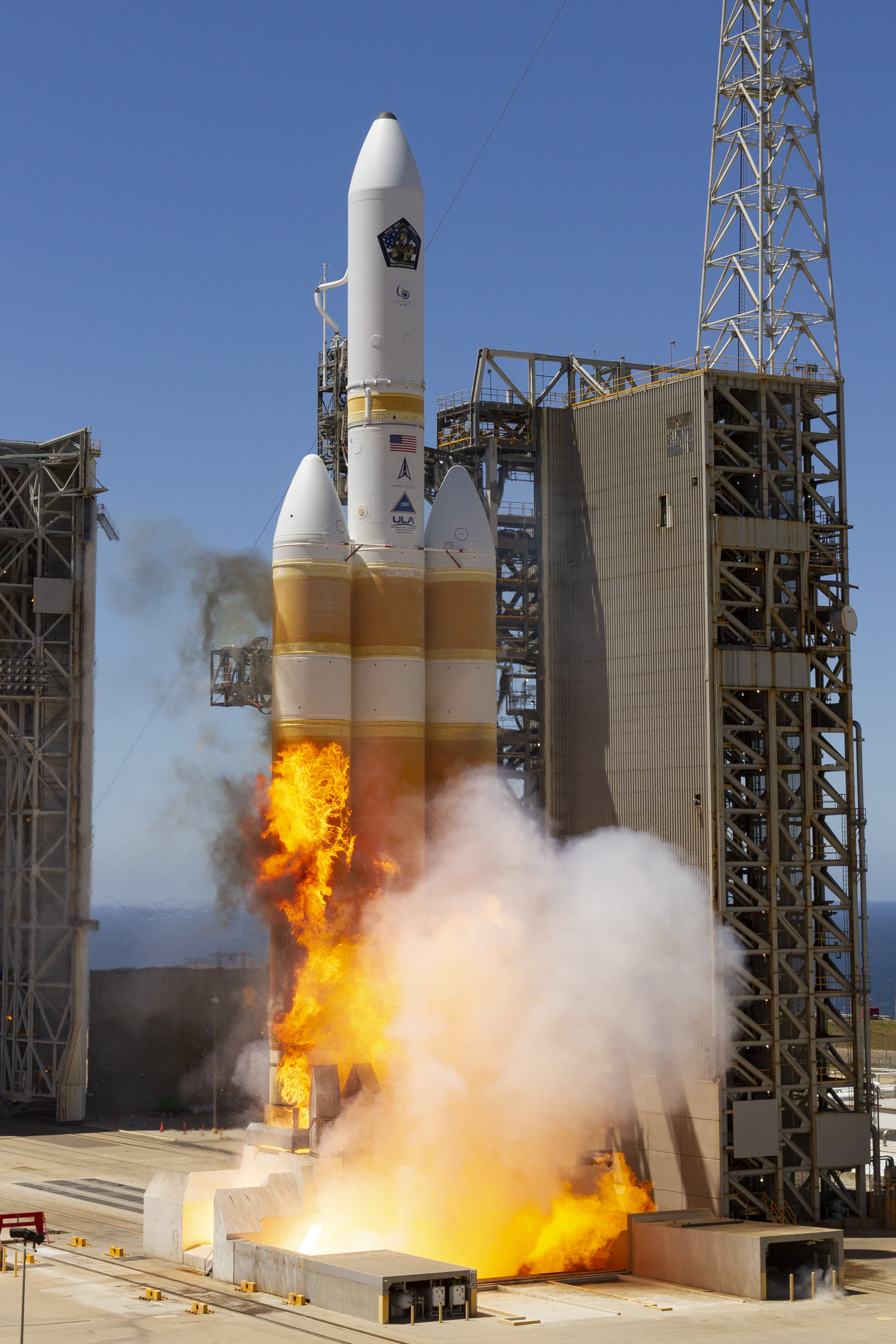
Launch of NROL-82 on Delta IV Heavy

A new generation of clandestine communications satellites launched to inclined geosynchronous orbits have led to speculations that these are in support of Block V electro-optical satellites scheduled for launch in late 2018 (NROL-71) and 2021 (NROL-82). The two satellites have been built by Lockheed Martin Space Systems, have a primary mirror with a diameter of 2.4 meters, and are evolutionary upgrades to the previous blocks built by Lockheed.

Based on the published hazard areas for the launch, an orbital inclination of 74° has been deduced for NROL-71. This could indicate that NROL-71 is targeted for a Type II Multi Sun-Synchronous Orbit, which would enable the satellite to study the ground at a range of local hour effects (shadow direction and length, daily activities, etc.).

== Derivatives ==
The Misty satellite is believed to have been derived from the KH-11, but modified to make it invisible to radar, and hard to detect visually. The first Misty satellite, USA-53, was released by the Space Shuttle Atlantis on mission STS-36 in 1990. The USA-144 satellite, launched on 22 May 1999 by a Titan IVB from Vandenberg Air Force Base may have been a second Misty satellite, or an Enhanced Imaging System spacecraft. The satellites are sometimes identified as KH-12s.

In January 2011, NRO donated to NASA two space Optical Telescope Assemblies with 2.4 meters (94 in) diameter primary mirrors, similar in size to the Hubble Space Telescope, yet with steerable secondary mirrors and shorter focal length (resulting in a wider field of view). These were initially believed to be KH-11 series "extra hardware", but were later attributed to the cancelled Future Imaging Architecture program. The mirrors are to be used by NASA as the primary and spare for the Roman Space Telescope.

== Compromises ==
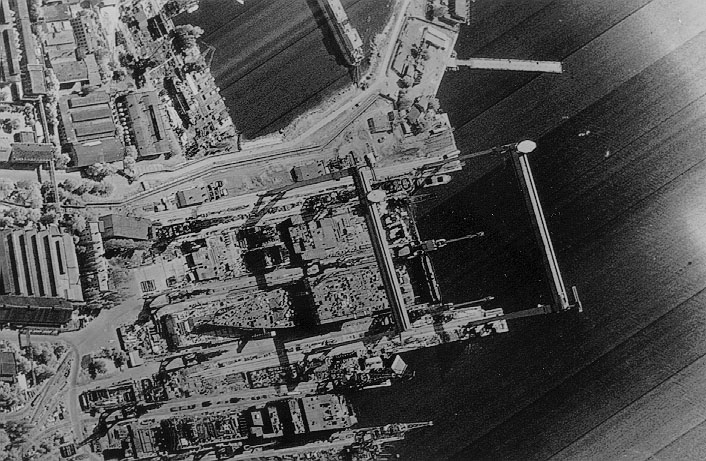
A KH-11 image of the construction of a Kiev-class aircraft carrier, as published by Jane's in 1984.

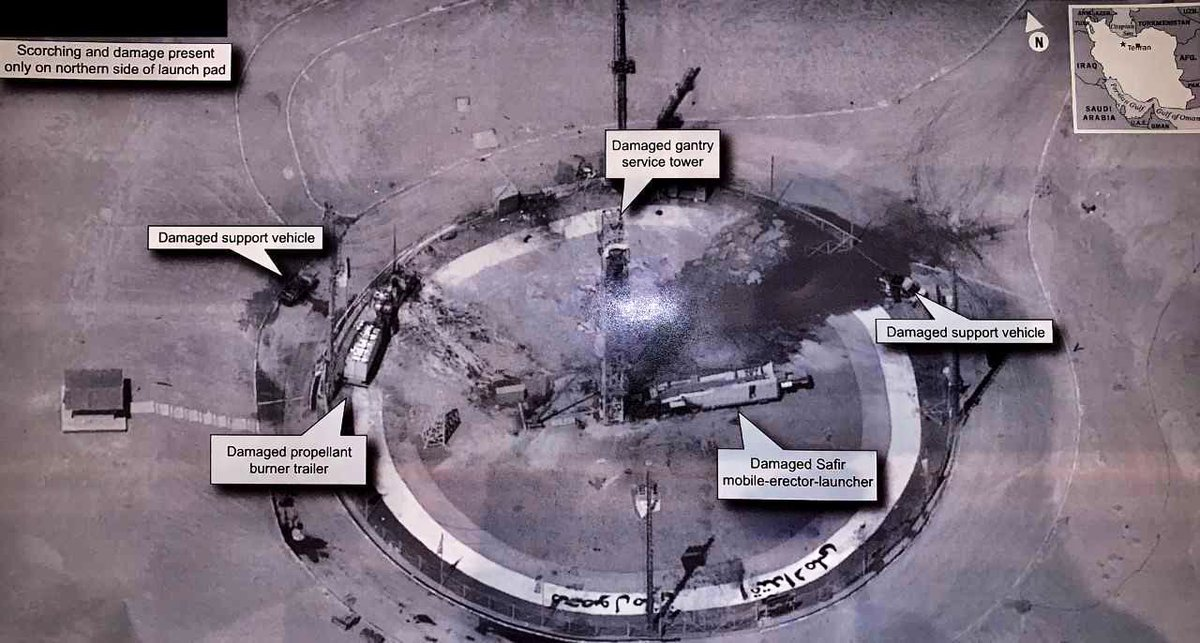
An image (resolution ~10 cm/px) of the damaged launch pad at Imam Khomeini Spaceport after a rocket explosion on 29 August 2019, speculated as being taken by a KH-11.

In 1978, a young CIA employee named William Kampiles was accused of selling a KH-11 System Technical Manual describing design and operation to the Soviets. Kampiles was convicted of espionage and initially sentenced to 40 years in prison. Later, this term was reduced, and after serving 18 years, Kampiles was released in 1996.

In 1984 Samuel Loring Morison, an intelligence analyst at the Naval Intelligence Support Center, forwarded three classified images taken by KH-11 to the publication Jane's Defence Weekly. In 1985, Morison was convicted in Federal Court on two counts of espionage and two counts of theft of government property, and was sentenced to two years in prison. He was pardoned by President Clinton in 2001.

In 2019 Donald Trump, as President of the United States, tweeted a classified image of the aftermath of a failed test of Iran's Safir rocket, which some believe was taken from the USA-224 satellite.

In Seymour Hersh's book The Samson Option: Israel's Nuclear Arsenal & American Foreign Policy Ari Ben-Menashe says that Israel had stolen images from the KH-11 in order to target missiles at the Soviet Union.

== KH-11 missions ==
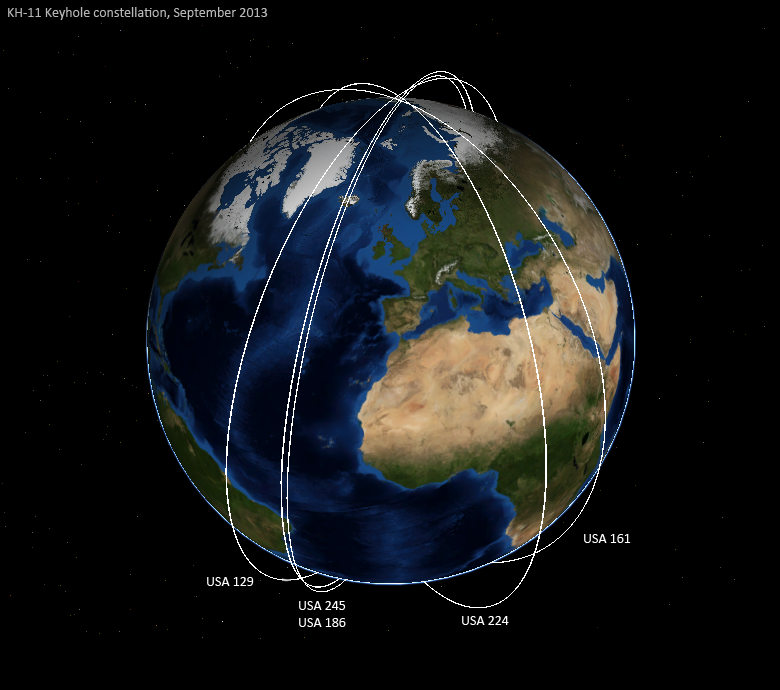
All KH-11 Keyhole satellites on orbit, orbital constellation status of September 2013.

Nine KH-11 satellites were launched between 1976 and 1990 aboard Titan-3D and Titan-34D launch vehicles, with one launch failure. For the following five satellite launches between 1992 and 2005, a Titan IV launch vehicle was used. The three most recent launches since 2011 were carried out by Delta IV Heavy launch vehicles. The KH-11 replaced the KH-9 film return satellite, among others, the last of which was lost in a liftoff explosion in 1986.

All KH-11 satellites are in either of two standard planes in Sun-synchronous orbits. As shadows help to discern ground features, satellites in a standard plane east of a noon/midnight orbit observe the ground at local afternoon hours, while satellites in a western plane observe the ground at local morning hours. Historically launches have therefore been timed to occur either about two hours before or one hour after local noon (or midnight), respectively. The orbits are such that ground-tracks repeat after a certain number of days, currently each four days for the primary satellites in the East and West orbital plane.

The constellation consists of two primary and two secondary satellites (one primary and one secondary per plane). The orbital planes of the two primary satellites in the East and West plane are separated by 48° to 50°. The orbital plane of the secondary satellite in the East plane is located 20° to the east of the primary satellite, while the orbital plane of the secondary satellite in the West plane is located 10° to the west of the primary satellite.

Name	KH-11 Block	Launch date	COSPAR ID SATCAT No.	Launch designation	Orbit	Plane	Orbital decay date
OPS 5705	1-1	19 December 1976	1976-125A; 09627	N/A	247 km × 533 km (153 mi × 331 mi) i=96.9°	West	28 January 1979
OPS 4515	1-2	14 June 1978	1978-060A; 10947	N/A	276 km × 509 km (171 mi × 316 mi) i=96.8°	West	23 August 1981
OPS 2581	1-3	7 February 1980	1980-010A; 11687	N/A	309 km × 501 km (192 mi × 311 mi) i=97.1°	East	30 October 1982
OPS 3984	1-4	3 September 1981	1981-085A; 12799	N/A	244 km × 526 km (152 mi × 327 mi) i=96.9°	West	23 November 1984
OPS 9627	1-5	17 November 1982	1982-111A; 13659	N/A	280 km × 522 km (174 mi × 324 mi) i=96.9°	East	13 August 1985
USA-6	2-1	4 December 1984	1984-122A; 15423	N/A	335 km × 758 km (208 mi × 471 mi) i=98°	West	10 November 1994
Unknown	2-2	28 August 1985	N/A	N/A	Failed to orbit	East	N/A
USA-27	2-3	26 October 1987	1987-090A; 18441	N/A	300 km × 1,000 km (190 mi × 620 mi), i=98°	East	11 June 1992
USA-33	2-4	6 November 1988	1988-099A; 19625	N/A	300 km × 1,000 km (190 mi × 620 mi), i=98°	West	12 May 1996
USA-86	3-1	28 November 1992	1992-083A; 22251	N/A	408 km × 931 km (254 mi × 578 mi), i=97.7°	East	5 June 2000
USA-116	3-2	5 December 1995	1995-066A; 23728	N/A	405 km × 834 km (252 mi × 518 mi), i=97.7°	East	19 November 2008
USA-129	3-3	20 December 1996	1996-072A; 24680	NROL-2	292 km × 894 km (181 mi × 556 mi), i=97.7°	West	24 April 2014
USA-161	3-4	5 October 2001	2001-044A; 26934	NROL-14	309 km × 965 km (192 mi × 600 mi), i=97.9°	East	late 2014
USA-186	4-1	19 October 2005	2005-042A; 28888	NROL-20	263 km × 450 km (163 mi × 280 mi), i=97.9°	West	
USA-224	4-2	20 January 2011	2011-002A; 37348	NROL-49	290 km × 985 km (180 mi × 612 mi), i=97.9°	East	
USA-245	4-3	28 August 2013	2013-043A; 39232	NROL-65	260 km × 1,007 km (162 mi × 626 mi), i=97.9°	West	
USA-290	5-1?	19 January 2019	2019-004A; 43941	NROL-71	395 km × 420 km (245 mi × 261 mi), i=73.6°	N/A	
USA-314	5-2?	26 April 2021	2021-032A; 48247	NROL-82	548 km × 773 km (341 mi × 480 mi), i=98.0°	East	
USA-338	5-3?	24 September 2022	2022-117A; 53883	NROL-91	364 km × 414 km (226 mi × 257 mi), i=73.6°	N/A	

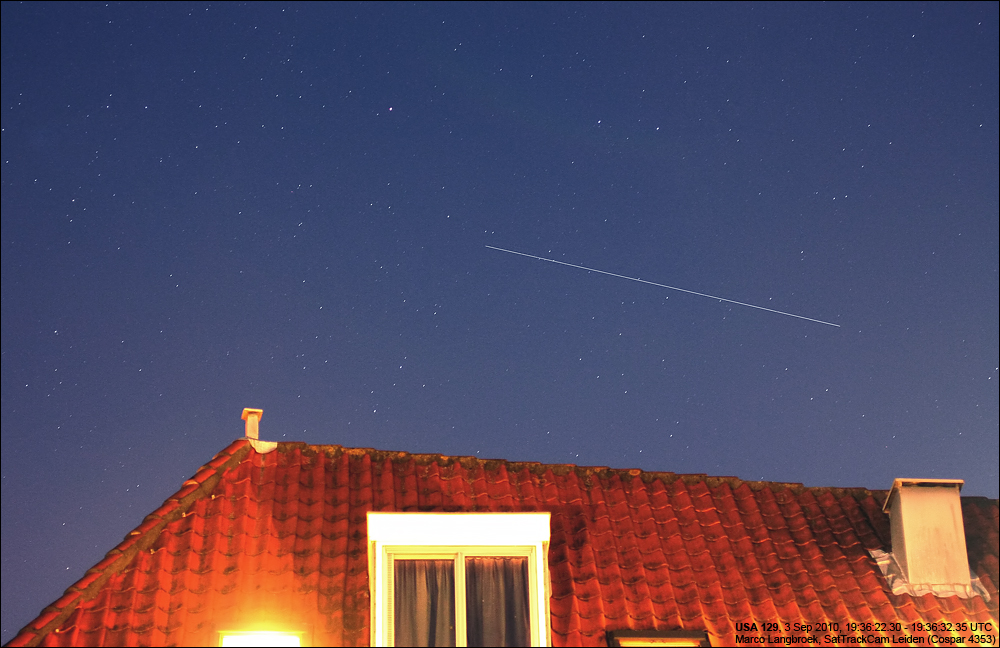
A bright pass of USA-129, a Block III satellite.

KH-11 satellites require periodic reboosts to counter atmospheric drag, or to adjust their ground track to surveillance requirements. Based on data collected by amateur observers, the following orbital characteristics of OPS 5705 were calculated by amateur skywatcher Ted Molczan.

OPS 5705 Time period	Perigee (AMSL)	Apogee (AMSL)	Apogee at end of period (AMSL)
19 December 1976 – 23 December 1976	253 km (157 mi)	541 km (336 mi)	541 km (336 mi)
23 December 1976 – 27 March 1977	348 km (216 mi)	541 km (336 mi)	537 km (334 mi)
27 March 1977 – 19 August 1977	270 km (170 mi)	537 km (334 mi)	476 km (296 mi)
19 August 1977 – January 1978	270 km (170 mi)	528 km (328 mi)	454 km (282 mi)
January 1978 – 28 January 1979	263 km (163 mi)	534 km (332 mi)	Deorbited

On 4 September 2010, amateur astrophotographer Ralf Vandebergh took some pictures of a KH-11 (USA-129) satellite from the ground. The pictures, despite being taken with a 250 mm (10 in) aperture telescope from a range of 336 kilometres (209 mi), show major details such as dishes and solar panels, as well as some elements whose function is not known.

== Cost ==
Estimated unit costs, including launch and in 1990 dollars, range from US$1.25 to US$1.75 billion (inflation adjusted $3.08 to $4.31 billion in 2025).

According to US Senator Kit Bond initial budget estimates for each of the two legacy KH-11 satellites ordered from Lockheed in 2005 were higher than for the latest Nimitz-class aircraft carrier (CVN-77) with its projected procurement cost of $6.35 billion as of May 2005. In 2011, after the launch of USA-224, DNRO Bruce Carlson announced that the procurement cost for the satellite had been $2 billion under the initial budget estimate, which would put it at about $4.4 billion (inflation adjusted $6.3 billion in 2025).

In April 2014, the NRO assigned a "worth more than $5 billion" to the final two legacy KH-11 satellites.

== Image gallery ==
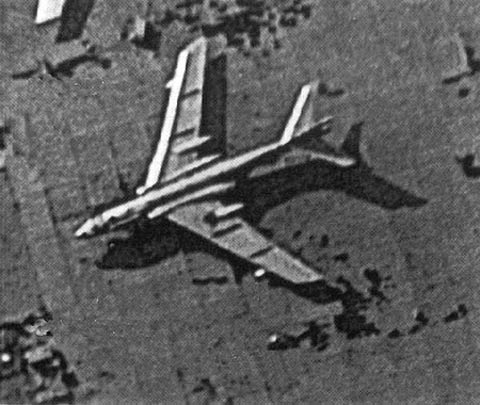
A KH-11 Block 1 image of a Xian H-6 jet bomber operated by China.

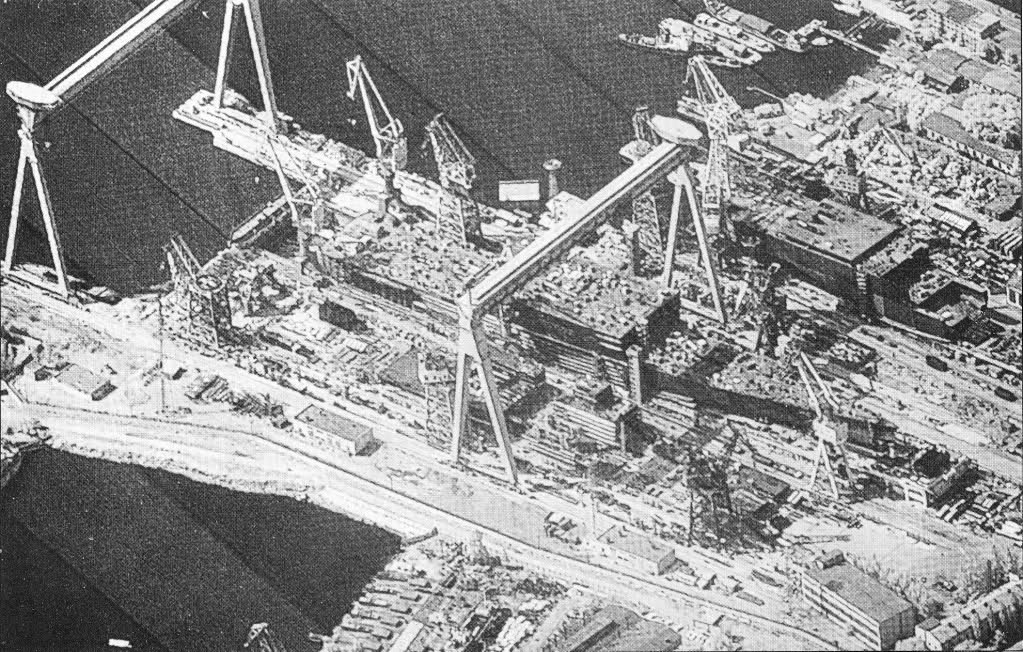
The 2nd KH-11 Block 1 image of the construction of a Kiev-class aircraft carrier leaked to Jane's in 1984.

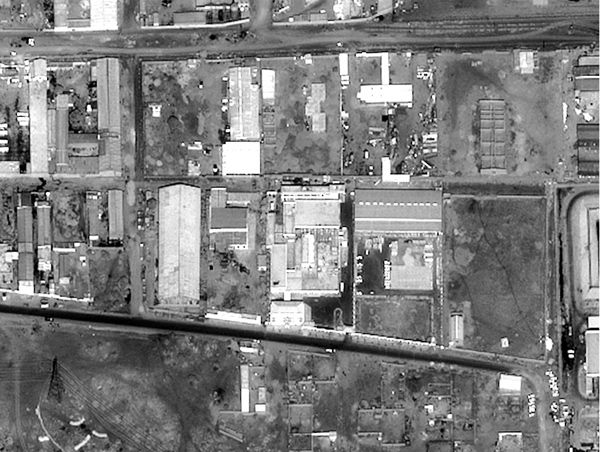
A U.S. reconnaissance satellite image of the Al-Shifa pharmaceutical factory, attributed to KH-11 Block 3.

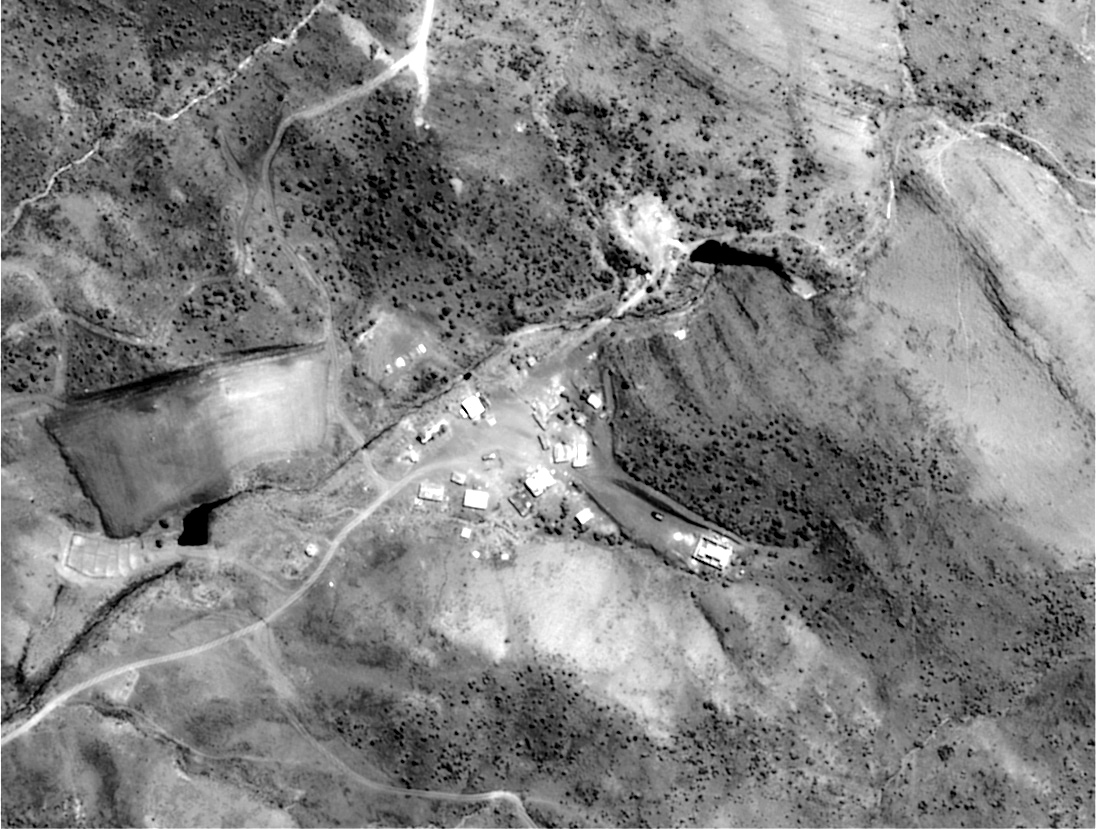
A KH-11 Block 2 image of the Zhawar Kili camp in Afghanistan.

== See also ==
- First images of Earth from space
