= Satellite watching =

Activity involving the observation and tracking of artificial satellites

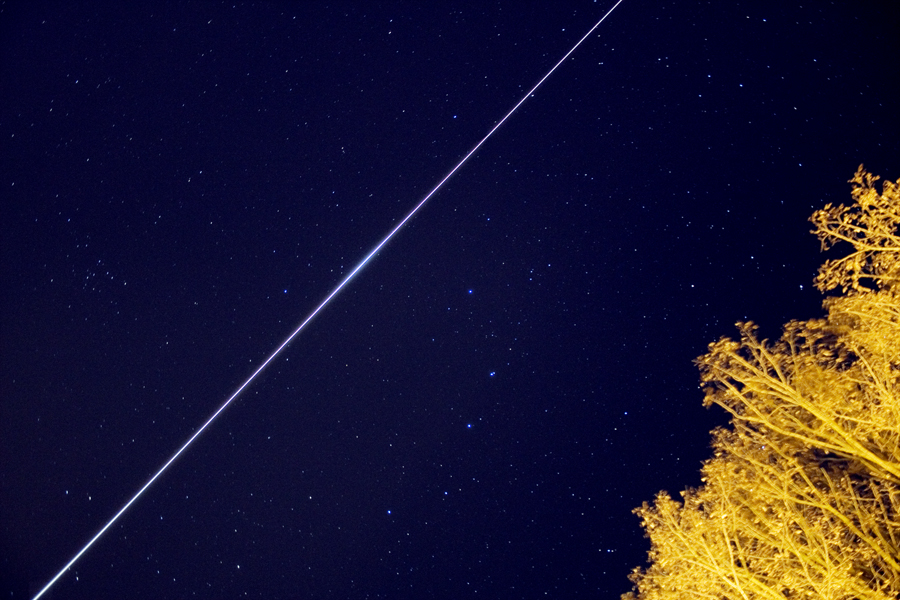
Skytrack long duration exposure of the International Space Station, the brightest artificial object in Earth's sky

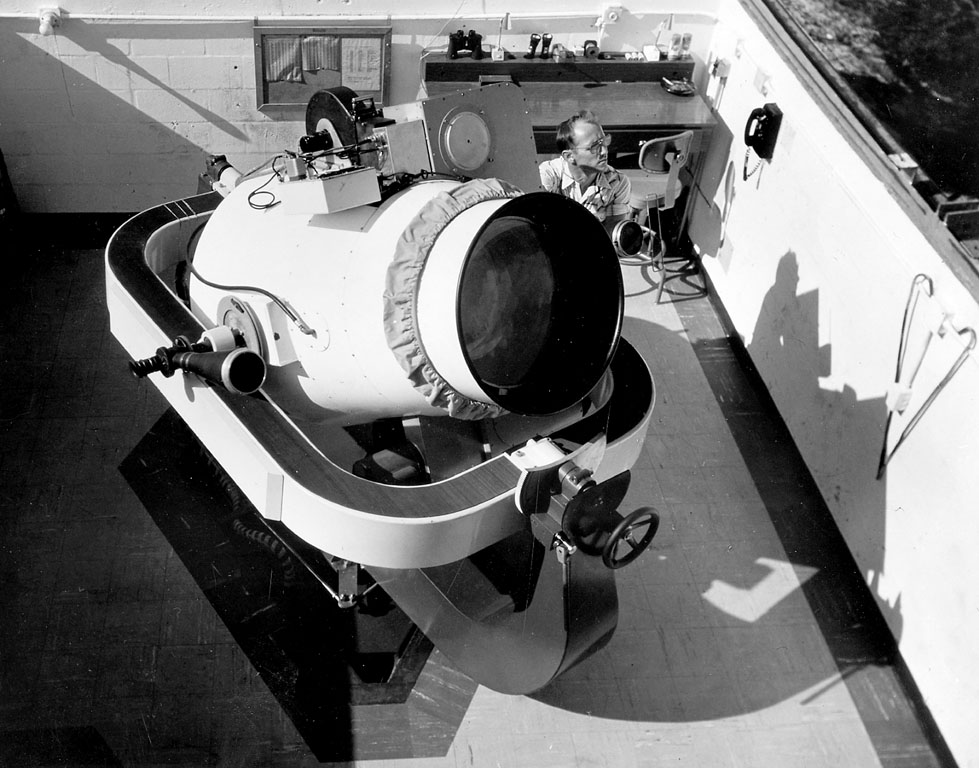
The Baker-Nunn satellite tracking camera.

Satellite watching or satellite spotting is a hobby which consists of the observation and tracking of artificial satellites that are orbiting Earth. People with this hobby are variously called satellite watchers, trackers, spotters, observers, etc. Since satellites outside Earth's shadow reflect sunlight, those especially in low Earth orbit may visibly glint (or "flare") as they traverse the observer's sky, usually during twilight.

== History ==
Amateur satellite spotting traces back to the days of early artificial satellites when the Smithsonian Astrophysical Observatory launched the Operation Moonwatch program in 1956 to enlist amateur astronomers in an early citizen science effort to track Soviet sputniks. The program was an analog to the World War II Ground Observer Corps citizen observation program to spot enemy bombers. Moonwatch was crucial until professional stations were deployed in 1958. The program was discontinued in 1975. The people who had been involved continued to track satellites however and began to concentrate on satellites that had been omitted from the Satellite Catalog (deliberately), these satellites are from the US and other, allied, countries.

In February 2008 the front page of The New York Times hosted an article about an amateur satellite watcher Ted Molczan in relation to the story about falling American spy satellite USA-193. American officials were reluctant to provide information about the satellite, and instead, Ted Molczan, as the article says, "uncovers some of the deepest of the government’s expensive secrets and shares them on the Internet." Molczan participates with a group of other sky-watchers who have created a "network of amateur sky-watchers and satellite observers" who focus on "spotting secret intelligence-gathering satellites launched by the United States, Russia and China." As of 2017, the amateurs continue to make their sightings and analysis public on the internet via an electronic mailing list called SeeSat-L, just as they had a decade earlier, since they began the practice in the previous century in days of the early internet.

Prior to 2008, NASA's Orbital Information Group had been providing free information about over 10,000 objects in Earth orbit. US security authorities identified this as a security threat, and a pilot program was launched in 2008 to replace the NASA OIG website with a US Air Force site (Space-Track.org) with somewhat more controlled access. The practice by the militaries of countries such as the United States to not distribute all of their satellite orbital data can be counteracted by the skills of satellite watchers, who can calculate the orbits of many military satellites.

As the digital revolution continued to advance in the 2000s, many planetarium and satellite tracking computer programs to aid satellite spotting emerged. In the 2010s, accompanied by the development of augmented reality (AR) technologies, satellite watching programs for mobile devices have been developed. During the 64th International Astronautical Congress 2013 in Beijing a citizen science method to track satellite beacon signals by a Distributed Ground Station Network (DGSN) was presented. The purpose of this network at announcement was to support small satellites and cubesats projects of universities.

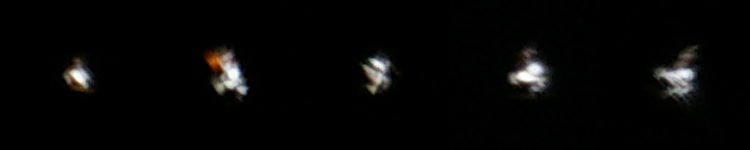
Photographs from Earth of the International Space Station with the Space Shuttle docked

In 2019, amateur sky-watchers analyzed the high-resolution photograph of an Iranian launch site accident tweeted by US President Trump and identified the specific classified spysat (USA-224, a KH-11 satellite with an objective mirror as large as the Hubble Space Telescope) that had taken the photograph, and when it was taken.

== Spotting satellites ==
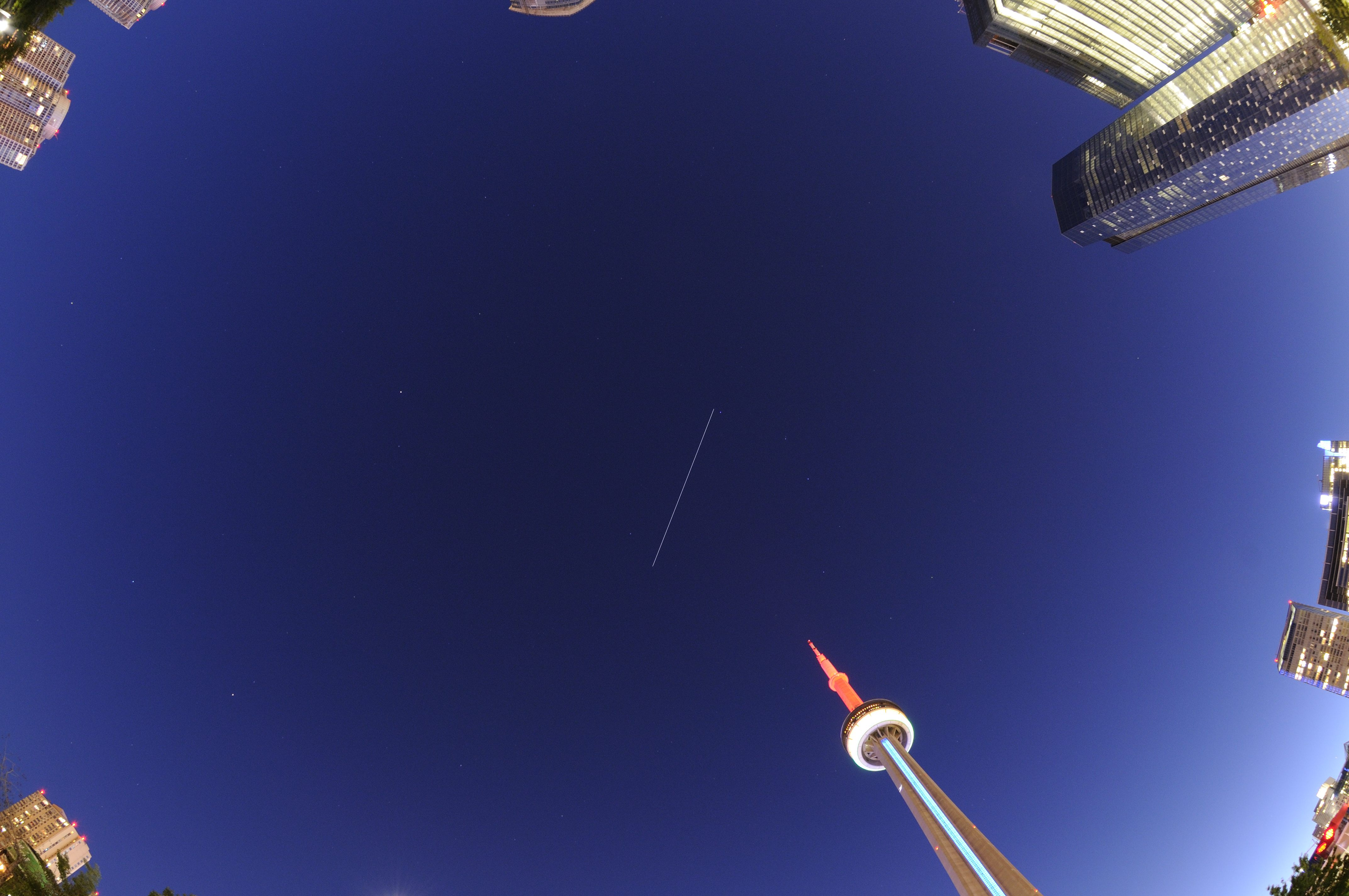
The ISS long exposure photographed from Earth nearly overhead shortly after sunset

Early satellite watching was done with the naked eye or with the aid of binoculars. The movement of the satellite across the sky is what largely contributes to its visibility. Hobbyists have better success in satellite watching when further away from light-polluted urban areas.

Today most observers use digital still cameras or video cameras. Images are processed using astrometry software to generate the angles needed to generate "observations" that are used to calculate orbits of the satellites imaged.

Because geosynchronous satellites move slowly relative to the viewer they can be difficult to find and were not typically sought when satellite watching. However, with digital cameras it is easy to photograph most high-altitude satellites.

Although to the observer, low Earth orbit satellites can move at a similar speed as high altitude commercial aircraft, individual satellites can be faster or slower; they do not all move at the same speed. Individual satellites never deviate in their velocity (speed and direction). They can be distinguished from aircraft because satellites do not leave contrails and do not have red and green navigation lights. They are lit solely by the reflection of sunlight from solar panels or other surfaces. A satellite's brightness sometimes changes as it moves across the sky. Occasionally a satellite will 'flare' as it changes orientation relative to the viewer, suddenly increasing in reflectivity. Satellites often grow dimmer and are more difficult to see toward the horizons. Since reflected sunlight is required to observe satellites, the best viewing times are a few hours after dusk or before dawn. Given the number of satellites now in orbit, a fifteen-minute session of sky watching will generally yield at least one satellite passing overhead.

== Satellite watcher clubs ==
There are many satellite watcher clubs, which collect observations and issue awards for observations according to various rules.

- The Astronomical League has the Earth Orbiting Satellite Observers Club.
- SeeSat-L is an internet mailing list of an amateur sky-watching group that focuses on spotting the military intelligence-gathering satellites of the United States, Russia and China. Many of these satellites are "visible with the naked eye and require only data-sharing to pinpoint."

== See also ==
- Pass (spaceflight)
- United States Space Surveillance Network
- Geoffrey Perry
