= Lacrosse (satellite) =

Series of American terrestrial radar imaging reconnaissance satellites

Lacrosse / Onyx
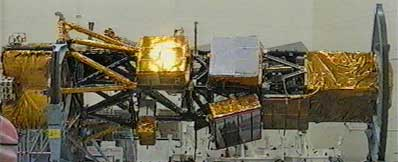
- An image released by the NRO, reportedly showing a Lacrosse satellite under construction.
- Manufacturer: Lockheed Martin
- Country of origin: United States
- Operator: U.S. National Reconnaissance Office
- Applications: Radar imaging

Specifications
- Regime: Low Earth

Production
- Status: Out of Production
- Built: 5 known
- Launched: 5
- Operational: 0
- Retired: All
- Maiden launch: USA-34, 1988-12-02
- Last launch: USA-182, 2005-04-30

Lacrosse or Onyx was a series of terrestrial radar imaging reconnaissance satellites operated by the United States National Reconnaissance Office (NRO). While not officially confirmed by the NRO or the Government of the United States prior to 2008, there was widespread evidence pointing to its existence, including one NASA website. In July 2008, the NRO itself declassified the existence of its synthetic aperture radar (SAR) satellite constellation.

According to former Director of Central Intelligence Admiral Stansfield Turner, Lacrosse had its origins in 1980 when a dispute between the Central Intelligence Agency and the U.S. Air Force as to whether a combined optical/radar reconnaissance satellite (the CIA proposal) or a radar-only one (the USAF proposal) should be developed was resolved in favor of the USAF.

Lacrosse uses synthetic aperture radar as its prime imaging instrument. It is able to see through cloud cover and also has some ability to penetrate soil, though there have been more powerful instruments deployed in space for this specific purpose. Early versions are believed to have used the Tracking and Data Relay Satellite System (TDRSS) to relay imagery to a ground station at White Sands, New Mexico. There are some indications that other relay satellites may now be available for use with Lacrosse. The name Lacrosse is used to refer to all variants, while Onyx is sometimes used to refer to the three newer units.

Unit costs (including launch) in 1990 dollars are estimated to be in the range of US$0.5 to 1.0 billion.

== Future ==
It had been anticipated that the Lacrosse satellites would be replaced by the radar component of the Future Imagery Architecture (FIA). The severe program problems encountered by FIA in the early 2000s (decade) led to a plan to off-load radar reconnaissance to the Space Based Radar, later simplified to Space Radar, with initial launch anticipated around 2015. This program itself was axed by Congress late 2008. The launch of NROL-41 (USA 215) in September 2010 has all orbital characteristics of a radar remote sensing platform (see FIA) and could be the first of a Lacrosse follow-up program. Its orbit is a retrograde version of the "frozen" Lacrosse orbit, the choice for a retrograde orbit itself indicating a SAR role.

== Launches ==
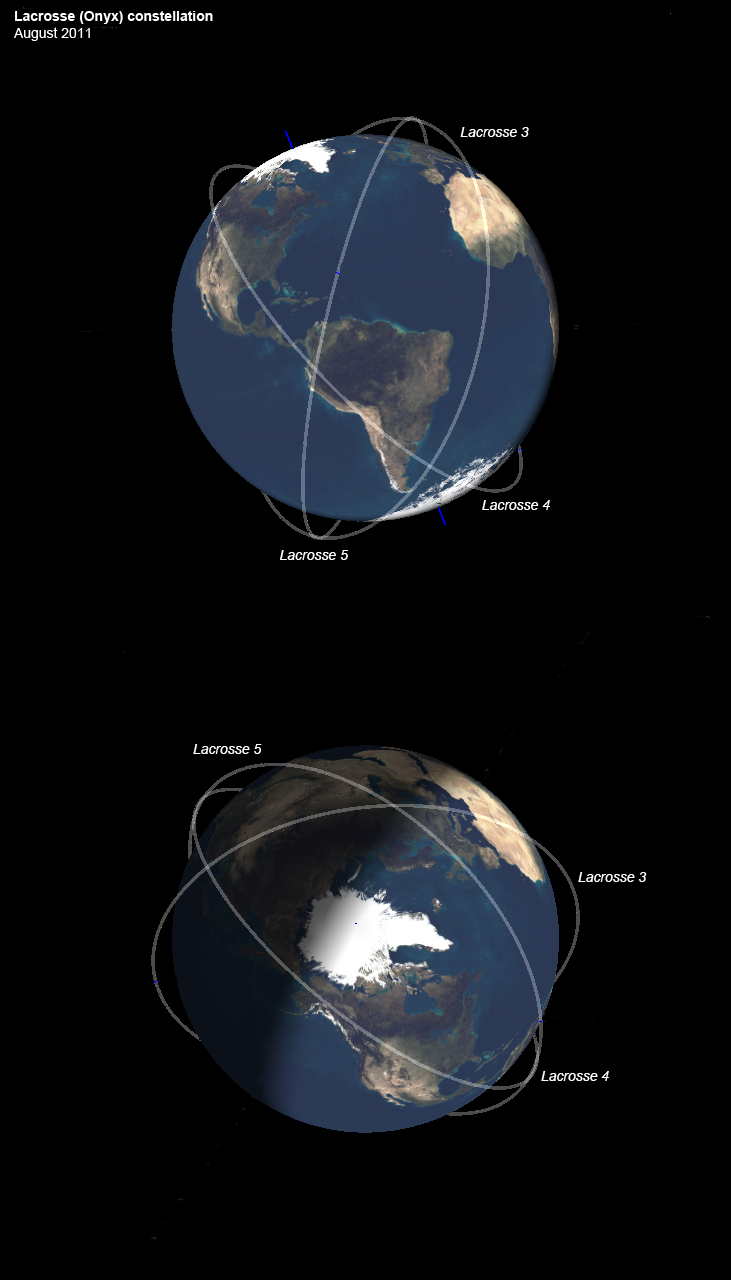
The constellation of the Lacrosse (Onyx) SAR satellites in orbit as of August 2011.

Five Lacrosse spacecraft have been launched, with none currently in orbit. The Lacrosse move in orbital planes either 68° or 57° inclined. These orbital inclinations of 68° and 57°, combined with their altitude give the satellites a complete view of the Earth's surface, including the north and south poles. Lacrosse 5 appears to differ somewhat from the previous four satellites. As determined by amateur observers, there are subtle differences in its orbit, and its color is somewhat whiter than the distinct red-orange tint of the earlier ones. Most strikingly, it sometimes fades from brightness to invisibility within the space of a few seconds while still in full sunlight. (Amateur observers call this rapid fade its "disappearing trick", although it appears to be an accidental phenomenon due to the design of the craft and not a deliberate stealth feature.)

Name	COSPAR ID SATCAT No.	Launch date (UTC)	Launch vehicle	Launch site	Launch designation	Orbit	Decay date	Remarks
USA-34	1988-106B; 19671	2 December 1988; 14:30:34	Space Shuttle Atlantis (STS-27)	KSC LC-39B	—N/a	437 km × 447 km × 57.0°	25 March 1997	
USA-69	1991-017A; 21147	8 March 1991; 12:03	Titan IV(403)A	VAFB SLC-4E	—N/a	420 km × 662 km × 68.0°	26 March 2011	First Titan IV launch from Vandenberg
USA-133	1997-064A; 25017	24 October 1997; 02:32	Titan IV(403)A	VAFB SLC-4E	NROL-3	666 km × 679 km × 57.0°	deorbited	
USA-152	2000-047A; 26473	17 August 2000; 23:45:01	Titan IV(403)B	VAFB SLC-4E	NROL-11	695 km × 689 km × 68.0°	deorbited	After initial orbit, minor adjustments were made, sending it to 675 km × 572 km × 68.1°.
USA-182	2005-016A; 28646	30 April 2005; 00:50:00	Titan IV(403)B	CCAFS SLC-40	NROL-16	712 km × 718 km × 57.0°	Deorbited	Final Titan launch from Cape Canaveral

== In pop culture ==
The story of the 1994 Andy Sidaris film The Dallas Connection involves a series of codes necessary to control a Lacrosse reconnaissance satellite.

The plot of the 2018 Hindi movie Parmanu: The Story of Pokhran involves a Lacrosse satellite as the US intelligence eye in the sky.

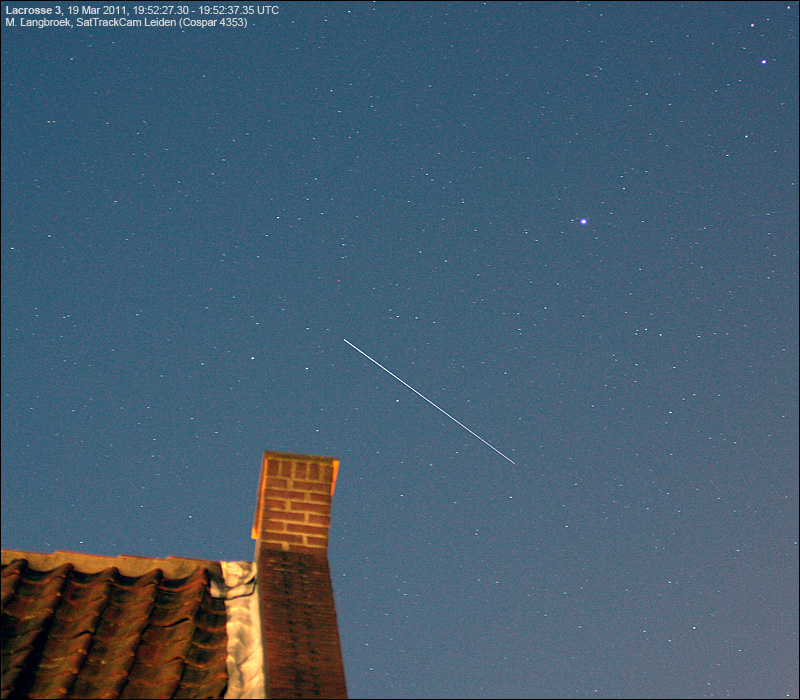
The USA-133 traversing Canis Minor as seen from Leiden, the Netherlands, on 19 March 2011.

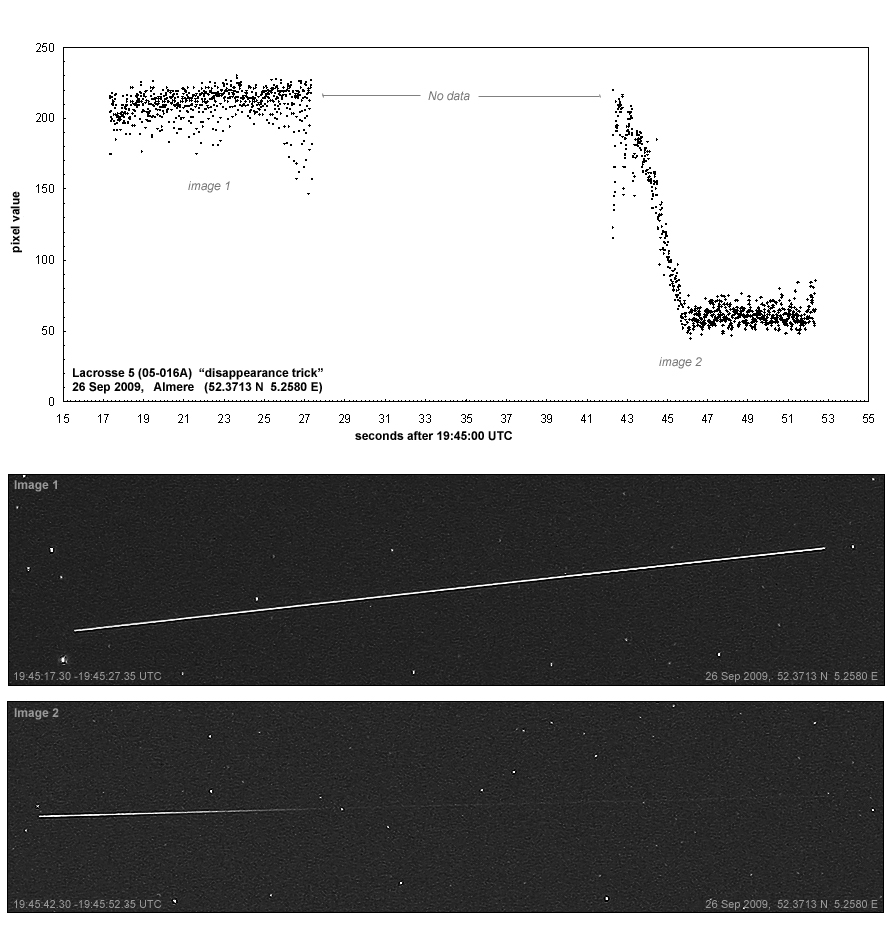
The Lacrosse 5 (2005-016A) brightness profile showing the sudden dip in brightness known as the "disappearance trick".

== See also ==
- Quill (satellite)
- SAR-Lupe, a German radar imaging reconnaissance satellite
