= List of NRO launches =

American spy satellites

The National Reconnaissance Office logo

This is a list of NRO Launch (NROL) designations for satellites operated by the United States National Reconnaissance Office (NRO). Those missions are generally classified, so that their exact purposes and orbital elements are not published.

However, amateur astronomers have managed to observe most of the satellites, and leaked information has led to the identification of many of the payloads.

== Launch statistics ==
=== Launch vehicle families ===
- Titan
- Atlas
- Taurus/Minotaur
- Delta
- Falcon
- Electron
- Antares

=== Launch sites ===
- Vandenberg (CA)
- Cape Canaveral (FL)
- Kennedy (FL)
- Wallops Island (VA)
- Mahia (New Zealand)

== Launch history ==
| Launch designation | Payload nickname | Satellite designation | Date/time, UTC | Launch site | Rocket | Orbit | Project | Function | Status | Patch | Remarks |
|---|---|---|---|---|---|---|---|---|---|---|---|
| NROL-1 | Nemesis | USA-179 | 31 August 2004; 23:17 | CCAFS, SLC-36A | Atlas IIAS | 39,053 × 1,316 km × 63.7° (Molniya) | Quasar 15 | Communications | Entered service, status unknown | | |
| NROL-2 | | USA-129 | 20 December 1996; 18:04 | VAFB, SLC-4E | Titan IV | LEO | KH-11 12 | Optical imaging | Deorbited | | First officially acknowledged launch of an NRO payload. Reentered on 1 May 2014. |
| NROL-3 | | USA-133 | 24 October 1997; 02:32 | VAFB, SLC-4E | Titan IV | 679 × 666 km × 57° (LEO) | Lacrosse 3 | Synthetic-aperture radar | Deorbited | | |
| NROL-4 | Oscar | USA-136 | 8 November 1997; 02:05 | CCAFS, SLC-41 | Titan IV/Centaur | 36,523 × 3,849 km × 63.6° (Molniya) | Trumpet 3 | ELINT | Entered service, status unknown | | |
| NROL-5 | Capricorn | USA-137 | 29 January 1998; 18:37 | CCAFS, SLC-36A | Atlas IIA | Molniya | Quasar 12 | Communications | Entered service, status unknown | | First acknowledged NRO launch on an Atlas rocket. |
| NROL-6 | Jack | USA-139 | 9 May 1998; 01:38 | CCAFS, SLC-40 | Titan IV/Centaur | 35,945 × 35,642 km × 8.4° (GSO) | Orion 4 | SIGINT | Entered service, presumed active | | |
| NROL-7 | Elwood | N/A | 12 August 1998; 11:30 | CCAFS, SLC-41 | Titan IV/Centaur | GSO (planned) | Mercury | ELINT | Destroyed | "Cheers! Saving the Best for Last!!" | Rocket self-destructed 40 seconds into launch due to guidance problem. |
| NROL-8 | | USA-140, USA-141 | 3 October 1998; 10:04 | VAFB, LC-576E | Taurus 1110 | LEO | STEX | Technology | Entered service, status unknown | | First NRO launch on a Taurus. ATEX experiment jettisoned on 16 January 1999 and catalogued as USA-141. |
| NROL-9 | | USA-144 | 22 May 1999; 09:36 | VAFB, SLC-4E | Titan IVB | | Misty | Optical imaging | Entered service, status unknown | | |
| NROL-10 | Ursa Major (Great Bear) | USA-155 | 6 December 2000; 02:47 | CCAFS, SLC-36A | Atlas IIAS | 35,854 × 35,732 km × 9.3° (GSO) | Quasar 13 | Communications | Entered service, presumed active | | |
| NROL-11 | Onyx / Vega | USA-152 | 17 August 2000; 23:45 | VAFB, SLC-4E | Titan IVB | 695 × 689 km × 68° (LEO) | Lacrosse 4 | SAR | Deorbited | | |
| NROL-12 | Aquila | USA-162 | 11 October 2001; 02:32 | CCAFS, SLC-36B | Atlas IIAS | 35,803 × 35,785 km × 10.9° (GSO) | Quasar 14 | Communications | Entered service, presumed active | | |
| NROL-13 | Gemini | USA-160 | 8 September 2001; 15:25 | VAFB, SLC-3E | Atlas IIAS | 1,486 × 740 km × 63.4° (LEO) | Intruder 5A & 5B | Naval reconnaissance | Entered service, status unknown | | Two satellites. |
| NROL-14 | | USA-161 | 5 October 2001; 21:21 | VAFB, SLC-4E | Titan IVB | LEO | KH-11 13 | Optical reconnaissance | Deorbited | | Reentered in November 2014. |
| NROL-15 | | USA-237 | 29 June 2012; 13:15 | CCAFS, SLC-37B | Delta IV Heavy (first RS-68A upgrade) | 35,960 × 35,628 km × 2.8° (GSO) | Orion 8 | SIGINT | Entered service, presumed active | | |
| NROL-16 | Prometheus | USA-182 | 30 April 2005; 00:50 | CCAFS, SLC-40 | Titan IVB | 728 × 725 km × 57.0° (LEO) | Lacrosse 5 | SAR | Deorbited | | |
| NROL-17 | GeoLITE | USA-158 | 18 May 2001; 17:45 | CCAFS, SLC-17B | Delta II 7925-9.5 | GSO | GeoLITE | Technology demonstration | Retired | | Testbed for experimental laser and UHF communications payloads.First acknowledged NRO launch on a Delta and a Thor-derived rocket. Boosted to graveyard orbit after end of mission. |
| NROL-18 | Libra | USA-173 | 2 December 2003; 10:04 | VAFB, SLC-3E | Atlas IIAS | 1,435 × 786 km × 63.4° (LEO) | Intruder 6A & B | Naval reconnaissance | Entered service, status unknown | | Two satellites. |
| NROL-19 | Homer | USA-171 | 9 September 2003; 04:29 | CCAFS, SLC-40 | Titan IVB-Centaur | 35,995 × 35,592 km × 11.4° (GSO) | Orion 5 | SIGINT | Entered service, presumed active | | |
| NROL-20 | | USA-186 | 19 October 2005; 18:05 | VAFB, SLC-4E | Titan IVB | 473 × 268 km × 96.9° (LEO) | KH-11 14 | Optical imaging | Entered service, presumed active | | Final NRO launch on a Titan rocket. |
| NROL-21 | | USA-193 | 14 December 2006; 21:00 | VAFB, SLC-2W | Delta II 7920-10 | LEO | Unknown | Unknown | Destroyed | | Final NRO launch on a Delta II and from a Thor-derived rocket. Failed on orbit immediately after launch. Destroyed by ASAT on 21 February 2008. |
| NROL-22 | | USA-184 | 28 June 2006; 03:33 | VAFB, SLC-6 | Delta IV M+(4,2) | 38,628 × 1,740 km × 63° (Molniya) | Improved Trumpet 4 | ELINT | Entered service, status unknown | | First NRO launch on a Delta IV. |
| NROL-23 | Canis Minor | USA-181 | 3 February 2005; 07:41 | CCAFS, SLC-36B | Atlas IIIB | 1,404 × 822 km × 63.4° (LEO) | Intruder 7A & 7B | Naval reconnaissance | Entered service, status unknown | | Two satellites. |
| NROL-24 | Scorpius | USA-198 | 10 December 2007; 22:05 | CCAFS, SLC-41 | Atlas V 401 | 39,899 × 461 km × 63.4° (Molniya) | Quasar 16 | Communications | Entered service, presumed active | | |
| NROL-25 | Altair | USA-234 | 3 April 2012; 23:12 | VAFB, SLC-6 | Delta IV M+ (5,2) | 1,112 × 1,109 km × 123° (Retrograde LEO) | Topaz 2 | Radar imaging | Entered service, presumed active | | |
| NROL-26 | | USA-202 | 18 January 2009; 02:47 | CCAFS, SLC-37B | Delta IV Heavy | 35,814 × 35,774 km × 6.1° (GSO) | Orion 6 | SIGINT | Entered service, presumed active | | First NRO launch on a Delta IV Heavy. |
| NROL-27 | Gryphon | USA-227 | 11 March 2011; 23:38 | CCAFS, SLC-37B | Delta IV M+(4,2) | 35,810 × 35,778 km × 4.6° (GSO) | Quasar 17 | Communications | Entered service, presumed active | | |
| NROL-28 | | USA-200 | 13 March 2008; 10:02 | VAFB, SLC-3E | Atlas V 411 | 38,009 × 2,362 km × 63.2° (Molniya) | Improved Trumpet 5 | ELINT | Entered service, status unknown | | |
| NROL-29 | | N/A | | VAFB, SLC-3E | Atlas V 521 | | | | Canceled | | |
| NROL-30 | Pyxis | USA-194 | 15 June 2007; 15:12 | CCAFS, SLC-41 | Atlas V 401 | 1,347 × 879 km × 63.4° (LEO) | Intruder 8A & 8B | Naval reconnaissance | Entered service, presumed active | | Two satellites. First NRO launch on an Atlas V. Premature 2nd stage cutoff during launch. Lifetime reduced by need to correct orbit. |
| NROL-32 | | USA-223 | 21 November 2010; 22:58 | CCAFS, SLC-37B | Delta IV Heavy | 35,979 × 35,609 km × 4.6° (GSO) | Orion 7 | SIGINT | Entered service, presumed active | | |
| NROL-33 | | USA-252 | 22 May 2014; 13:09 | CCAFS, SLC-41 | Atlas V 401 | 35,810 × 35,778 km × 2.7° (GSO) | Quasar 19 | Communications | Entered service, presumed active | | |
| NROL-34 | Odin | USA-229 | 15 April 2011; 04:24 | VAFB, SLC-3E | Atlas V 411 | 1,261 × 965 km × 63.4° (LEO) | Intruder 9A & 9B | Naval reconnaissance | Entered service, presumed active | | Two satellites. |
| NROL-35 | Jacquelyn | USA-259 | 13 December 2014; 03:19 | VAFB, SLC-3E | Atlas V 541 | 39,083 × 1,286 km × 63.4° (Molniya) | Trumpet 6 (third generation) | ELINT | Entered service, presumed active | | |
| NROL-36 | | USA-238 | 13 September 2012; 21:39 | VAFB, SLC-3E | Atlas V 401 | 1,225 × 1,001 km × 63.4° (LEO) | Intruder 10A & 10B | Naval reconnaissance | Entered service, presumed active | | Two satellites sharing a designation. |
| NROL-37 | | USA-268 | 11 June 2016; 17:51 | CCAFS, SLC-37B | Delta IV Heavy | 35,993 × 35,594 km × 6.5° (GSO) | Orion 9 | SIGINT | Entered service, presumed active | | Likely the seventh so called Mentor/Orion satellite for the National Security Agency. |
| NROL-38 | Drake | USA-236 | 20 June 2012; 12:28 | CCAFS, SLC-41 | Atlas V 401 | 35,815 × 35,773 km × 3.1° (GSO) | Quasar 18 | Communications | Entered service, presumed active | | |
| NROL-39 | | USA-247 | 6 December 2013; 07:14 | VAFB, SLC-3E | Atlas V 501 | 1,113 × 1,109 km × 123° (Retrograde LEO) | Topaz 3 | Radar imaging | Entered service, presumed active | | |
| NROL-41 | Gladys | USA-215 | 21 September 2010; 04:03 | VAFB, SLC-3E | Atlas V 501 | 1,112 × 1,109 km × 123° (Retrograde LEO) | Topaz 1 | Radar imaging | Entered service, presumed active | | |
| NROL-42 | | USA-278 | 24 September 2017; 05:49:47 | VAFB, SLC-3E | Atlas V 541 | 39,230 × 1,138 km × 63.6° (Molniya) | Trumpet 7 (third generation) | ELINT | Entered service, presumed active | | |
| NROL-44 | | USA-311 | 11 December 2020; 01:09 | CCSFS, SLC-37B | Delta IV Heavy | 35,992 × 35,596 km × 7.6° (GSO) | Orion 10 | SIGINT | Entered service, presumed active | | |
| NROL-45 | | USA-267 | 10 February 2016; 11:40 | VAFB, SLC-6 | Delta IV M+(5,2) | 1,115 × 1,106 km × 123° (Retrograde LEO) | Topaz 4 | Radar imaging | Entered service, presumed active | | |
| NROL-47 | | USA-281 | 12 January 2018; 22:11 | VAFB, SLC-6 | Delta IV M+(5,2) | 1,088 × 1,085 km × 106° (Retrograde LEO) | Topaz 5 | Radar imaging | Entered service, presumed active | | |
| NROL-48 | | USA-558 - USA-565 | 22 September 2025; 17:38 | VSFB, SLC-4E | Falcon 9 Block 5 | 425 × 310 km × 69.7° LEO | Starshield | | Entered service, presumed active | | NRO's Proliferated Architecture Mission of 8 Starshield satellites. |
| NROL-49 | Betty | USA-224 | 20 January 2011; 21:10 | VAFB, SLC-6 | Delta IV Heavy | 1,003 × 262 km × 97.9° (LEO) | KH-11 15 | Optical imaging | Entered service, presumed active | | |
| NROL-52 | | USA-279 | 15 October 2017; 07:28 | CCAFS, SLC-41 | Atlas V 421 | 35,810 × 35,778 km × 3.2° (GSO) | Quasar 21 | Communications | Entered service, presumed active | | |
| NROL-55 | | USA-264 | 8 October 2015; 12:49 | VAFB, SLC-3E | Atlas V 401 | 1,150 × 1,076 km × 63.4° (LEO) | Intruder 11A & 11B | Naval reconnisance | Entered service, presumed active | Mission "patch" of NROL-55: a weapon smith (Hephaestus) is forging a sword. "SUSTENTANTES BELLATORES DE CÆLIS" means something like "In sustained support for the warriors, from the sky/or heaven" | Two classified satellites (NROL-55) and 13 CubeSats. |
| NROL-56 | | - | NLT 2026 | CCSFS, SLC-41 | Vulcan Centaur | | | | Awaiting launch | | |
| NROL-57 | | USA-487 - USA-497 | 21 March 2025; 06:49 | VSFB, SLC-4E | Falcon 9 Block 5 | 425 × 310 km × 69.7° LEO | Starshield | | Entered service, presumed active | | NRO's Proliferated Architecture Mission of 11 Starshield satellites. |
| NROL-61 | Spike | USA-269 | 28 July 2016; 12:37 | CCAFS, SLC-41 | Atlas V 421 | 35,808 × 35,779 km × 2.8° (GSO) | Quasar 20 | Communications | Entered service, presumed active | | |
| NROL-64 | | - | NET 2026 | CCSFS, SLC-41 | Vulcan Centaur | | | | Awaiting launch | | |
| NROL-65 | | USA-245 | 28 August 2013; 18:03 | VAFB, SLC-6 | Delta IV Heavy | 991 × 275 km × 97.9° (LEO) | KH-11 16 | Optical imaging | Entered service, presumed active | | |
| NROL-66 | | USA-225 | 6 February 2011; 12:26 | VAFB, SLC-8 | Minotaur I | 1,232 × 1,214 km × 90.1° (LEO) | RPP | Technology | Entered service, status unknown | | |
| NROL-67 | | USA-250 | 10 April 2014; 17:45 | CCAFS, SLC-41 | Atlas V 541 | 35,811 × 35,777 km × 1.4° (GSO) | SIGINT High Altitude Replenishment Program (SHARP-1) | SIGINT | Entered service, presumed active | | |
| NROL-68 | | USA-345 | 22 June 2023; 09:18 | CCSFS, SLC-37B | Delta IV Heavy | | Orion 11 | SIGINT | Entered service, presumed active | | |
| NROL-69 | | USA-498 | 24 March 2025; 17:48 | CCSFS, SLC-40 | Falcon 9 Block 5 | | Intruder F/O 2 | Naval reconnaissance | Entered service, presumed active | | Fourth generation NOSS satellite. |
| NROL-70 | | USA-353 | 9 April 2024; 16:53 | CCSFS, SLC-37B | Delta IV Heavy | | Orion 12 | SIGINT | Entered service, status unknown | | Final NRO launch from a Delta IV, a Delta IV Heavy, and on a Delta rocket. |
| NROL-71 | | USA-290 | 19 January 2019; 19:05 | VAFB, SLC-6 | Delta IV Heavy | 423 × 406 km × 73.6° (LEO) | KH-11 17 | Optical imaging | Entered service, presumed active | | |
| NROL-73 | | - | NLT 2026 | VSFB, SLC-3E | Vulcan Centaur | | | | Awaiting launch | | |
| NROL-76 | | USA-276 | 1 May 2017; 11:15 | KSC, LC-39A | Falcon 9 Full Thrust | 393 × 393 km × 50.0° (LEO) | | | Entered service, presumed active | | First NRO launch on SpaceX's Falcon 9 and first NRO launch from Kennedy Space Center. (Note: While the Space Shuttle had nine launches with NRO payloads throughout the late 1980s and early 1990s, this was the first from Kennedy officially acknowledged by the NRO.) Originally intended to launch from SLC-40, but was moved to LC-39A following the AMOS-6 preclusion. |
| NROL-77 | | USA-570 | 9 December 2025; 19:16 | CCSFS, SLC-40 | Falcon 9 Block 5 | | NOSS | Naval reconnaissance | Entered service, presumed active | | |
| NROL-79 | | USA-274 | 1 March 2017; 17:50 | VAFB, SLC-3E | Atlas V 401 | 1,119 × 1,107 km × 63.4° (LEO) | Intruder 12A & 12B | Naval reconnaissance | Entered service, presumed active | | Two classified satellites sharing a designation. |
| NROL-82 | | USA-314 | 26 April 2021; 20:47 | VAFB, SLC-6 | Delta IV Heavy | 794 × 535 km × 98.1° (LEO) | KH-11 18 | Electro-optical surveillance | Entered service, presumed active | | |
| NROL-83 | | - | NET 2026 | VSFB, SLC-3E | Vulcan Centaur | | | | Awaiting launch | | |
| NROL-85 | | USA-327 | 17 April 2022; 13:13 | VSFB, SLC-4E | Falcon 9 Block 5 | LEO 63° | Intruder F/O 2 | Naval reconnaissance | Entered service, presumed active | | Fourth generation NOSS satellite. |
| NROL-86 | | - | NLT 2027 | KSC, LC-39A | Falcon Heavy | | | | Awaiting launch | | |
| NROL-87 | | USA-326 | 2 February 2022; 20:27 | VSFB, SLC-4E | Falcon 9 Block 5 | SSO | | | Entered service, presumed active | | |
| NROL-88 | | - | NLT 2027 | CCSFS, SLC-41 | Vulcan Centaur | | | | Awaiting launch | | |
| NROL-91 | | USA-338 | 24 September 2022; 22:25 | VSFB, SLC-6 | Delta IV Heavy | LEO | KH-11 19 | Electro-optical surveillance | Entered service, presumed active | | |
| NROL-95 | | USA-619 | 30 July 2026; 07:10 | CCSFS, SLC-40 | Falcon 9 Block 5 | | NOSS | Naval reconnaissance | Entered service, presumed active | | |
| NROL-96 | | - | NET 2027 | VSFB, SLC-4E or SLC-6 | Falcon 9 Block 5 | | | | Awaiting launch | | |
| NROL-97 | | USA-708 | 2 October 2026; 03:54 | KSC, LC-39A | Falcon Heavy | | | | Entered service, presumed active | | First NRO launch on a Falcon Heavy. |
| NROL-100 | | - | NLT 2026 | VSFB, SLC-3E | Vulcan Centaur | | | | Awaiting launch | | |
| NROL-101 | | USA-310 | 13 November 2020; 22:32 | CCAFS, SLC-41 | Atlas V 531 | 11105 × 11081 km × 58.5° (MEO) | | | Entered service, presumed active | | |
| NROL-105 | | USA-572 - USA-580 | 17 January 2026; 04:39 | VSFB, SLC-4E | Falcon 9 Block 5 | LEO | Starshield | | Entered service, presumed active | | NRO's Proliferated Architecture Mission of 9 Starshield satellites. |
| NROL-107 | | USA-346; USA-347; USA-348 | 10 September 2023; 12:47 | CCSFS, SLC-41 | Atlas V 551 | GSO 42464 × 41864 km × 0° | Silentbarker | Situational awareness | Entered service, presumed active | | Three satellites. Final NRO launch from an Atlas V and on an Atlas rocket. |
| NROL-108 | | USA-312; USA-313 | 19 December 2020; 14:00 | KSC, LC-39A | Falcon 9 Block 5 | 540 × 528 km × 53°(LEO) | | | Entered service, presumed active | | Two satellites, possibly SpaceX Starshield prototypes. |
| NROL-109 | | - | NLT 2026 | CCAFS, SLC-41 | Vulcan Centaur | | | | Awaiting launch | | |
| NROL-111 | | USA-316; USA-317; USA-318 | 15 June 2021; 13:35 UTC | MARS, LP-0B | Minotaur I | | | Technology | Entered service, presumed active | | Three satellites. |
| NROL-113 | | USA-400 - USA-420 | 6 September 2024; 03:20 | VSFB, SLC-4E | Falcon 9 Block 5 | LEO | Starshield | | Entered service, presumed active | | NRO's Proliferated Architecture Mission of 21 Starshield satellites. |
| NROL-118 | | - | NLT 2026 | CCAFS, SLC-41 | Vulcan Centaur | GSO | Silentbarker | Situational awareness | Awaiting launch | | |
| NROL-123 (RASR-5) | | USA-352; MOLA; Aerocube 16A; Aerocube 16B | 21 March 2024; 07:25 UTC | MARS, LP-0C | Electron | LEO | | Technology | Entered service, presumed active | | RASR-5. Four satellites. First NRO launch on an Electron within the United States.. |
| NROL-126 | | USA 438, USA 339 | 30 November 2024; 8:10 | VSFB, SLC-4E | Falcon 9 Block 5 | LEO | Starshield | | Entered service, presumed active | | NRO's Proliferated Architecture Mission of 2 Starshield satellites with 20 Starlink Group N-01 satellites.. |
| NROL-129 | | USA-305; USA-306; USA-307; USA-308 | 15 July 2020; 13:46 UTC | MARS, LP-0B | Minotaur IV / Orion 38 | 580 × 574 km × 54.0° (LEO) | | | Entered service, presumed active | | Four payloads. First NRO launch on a Minotaur rocket and first conducted from Virginia's Space Coast. |
| NROL-136 | | | 22 November 2026; 12:23 | VSFB, SLC-4E | Falcon 9 Block 5 | LEO | Starshield | | Entered service, presumed active | | NRO's Proliferated Architecture Mission of Starshield satellites. |
| NROL-145 | | USA-523 - USA-544 | 20 April 2025; 12:29 | VSFB, SLC-4E | Falcon 9 Block 5 | LEO | Starshield | | Entered service, presumed active | | NRO's Proliferated Architecture Mission of 22 Starshield satellites. First NRO Proliferated Architecture Mission launch in partnership with USSF under the NSSL Phase 3 Lane 1 contract. |
| NROL-146 | | USA-354 - USA-374 | 22 May 2024; 08:00 | VSFB, SLC-4E | Falcon 9 Block 5 | 425 × 310 km × 69.7° LEO | Starshield | | Entered service, presumed active | | NRO's Proliferated Architecture Mission of 21 Starshield satellites. |
| NROL-149 | | USA-441 - USA-462 | 17 December 2024; 13:19 | VSFB, SLC-4E | Falcon 9 Block 5 | 425 × 310 km × 69.7° LEO | Starshield | | Entered service, presumed active | | NRO's Proliferated Architecture Mission of 22 Starshield satellites. |
| NROL-151 (RASR-1) | Deep Dive | USA-294 | 31 January 2020; 02:56 | Mahia, LC-1A | Electron | 594 × 586 km × 70.0° (LEO) | | Technology | Entered service, presumed active | | First NRO launch from Rocket Lab's Electron and first NRO launch from outside the United States, conducted from Mahia in New Zealand. First launch procured under NRO's Rapid Acquisition of a Small Rocket (RASR) program. |
| NROL-153 | | USA-463 - USA-484 | 10 January 2025; 03:53 | VSFB, SLC-4E | Falcon 9 Block 5 | 425 × 310 km × 69.7° LEO | Starshield | | Entered service, presumed active | | NRO's Proliferated Architecture Mission of 22 Starshield satellites. |
| NROL-157 | | - | NET 2027 | VSFB, SLC-4E or SLC-6 | Falcon 9 Block 5 | | | | Awaiting launch | | |
| NROL-162 (RASR-3) | | USA-334 | 13 July 2022; 06:30 | Mahia, LC-1A | Electron | | | | Entered service, presumed active | | RASR-3. Back-to-back launch under NRO's Rapid Acquisition of a Small Rocket (RASR) program. |
| NROL-167 | | USA-421 - USA-437 | 24 October 2024; 17:13 | VSFB, SLC-4E | Falcon 9 Block 5 | LEO | Starshield | | Entered service, presumed active | | NRO's Proliferated Architecture Mission of 17 Starshield satellites. |
| NROL-172 | | USA-586 - USA-607 | 12 May 2026; 02:13 | VSFB, SLC-4E | Falcon 9 Block 5 | LEO | Starshield | | Entered service, presumed active | | NRO's Proliferated Architecture Mission of 22 Starshield satellites. |
| NROL-174 | | USA-521 - USA-522 | 16 April 2025; 19:33 | VSFB, SLC-8 | Minotaur IV / Orion 38 | LEO | | | Entered service, presumed active | | |
| NROL-179 | | USA-610 - USA-618 | 19 June 2026; 08:50 | VSFB, SLC-4E | Falcon 9 Block 5 | LEO | Starshield | | Entered service, presumed active | | NRO's Proliferated Architecture Mission of 9 Starshield satellites. |
| NROL-186 | | USA-375 - USA-395 | 29 June 2024; 03:14 | VSFB, SLC-4E | Falcon 9 Block 5 | LEO | Starshield | | Entered service, presumed active | | NRO's Proliferated Architecture Mission of 21 Starshield satellites. |
| NROL-192 | | USA-499 - USA-520 | 12 April 2025 12:25 | VSFB, SLC-4E | Falcon 9 Block 5 | LEO | Starshield | | Entered service, presumed active | | NRO's Proliferated Architecture Mission of 22 Starshield satellites. |
| NROL-195 | | | November 2026 | VSFB, SLC-4E | Falcon 9 Block 5 | LEO | Starshield | | Awaiting launch | | NRO's Proliferated Architecture Mission of Starshield satellites. |
| NROL-199 (RASR-4) | | USA-335 | 4 August 2022; 05:00 | Mahia, LC-1B | Electron | | | | Entered service, presumed active | | RASR-4. Back-to-back launch under NRO's Rapid Acquisition of a Small Rocket (RASR) program. |
| RASR-2 | | USA-301; USA-302; USA-303 | 13 June 2020; 05:12 | Mahia, LC-1A | Electron | | | | Entered service, presumed active | | Three technology demonstration smallsats. Primary customer of the rideshare mission procured under NRO's Rapid Acquisition of a Small Rocket (RASR) program. Flew on Rocket Lab's "Don't Stop Me Now" mission. |
| Undesignated | | IMPACT-2A and IMPACT-2B | 2 November 2019; 13:59:47 | MARS, LP-0A | Antares | | | Technology demonstration | Entered service, presumed active | | Two technology demonstration CubeSats launched as part of the NRO's IMPACT program. Secondary payloads, launched with Cygnus NG-12. |
| Launch designation | Launch name | Satellite designation | Launch date/time (UTC) | Launch site | Rocket | Orbit | Project | Function | Status | Patch | Remarks |

== Gallery ==
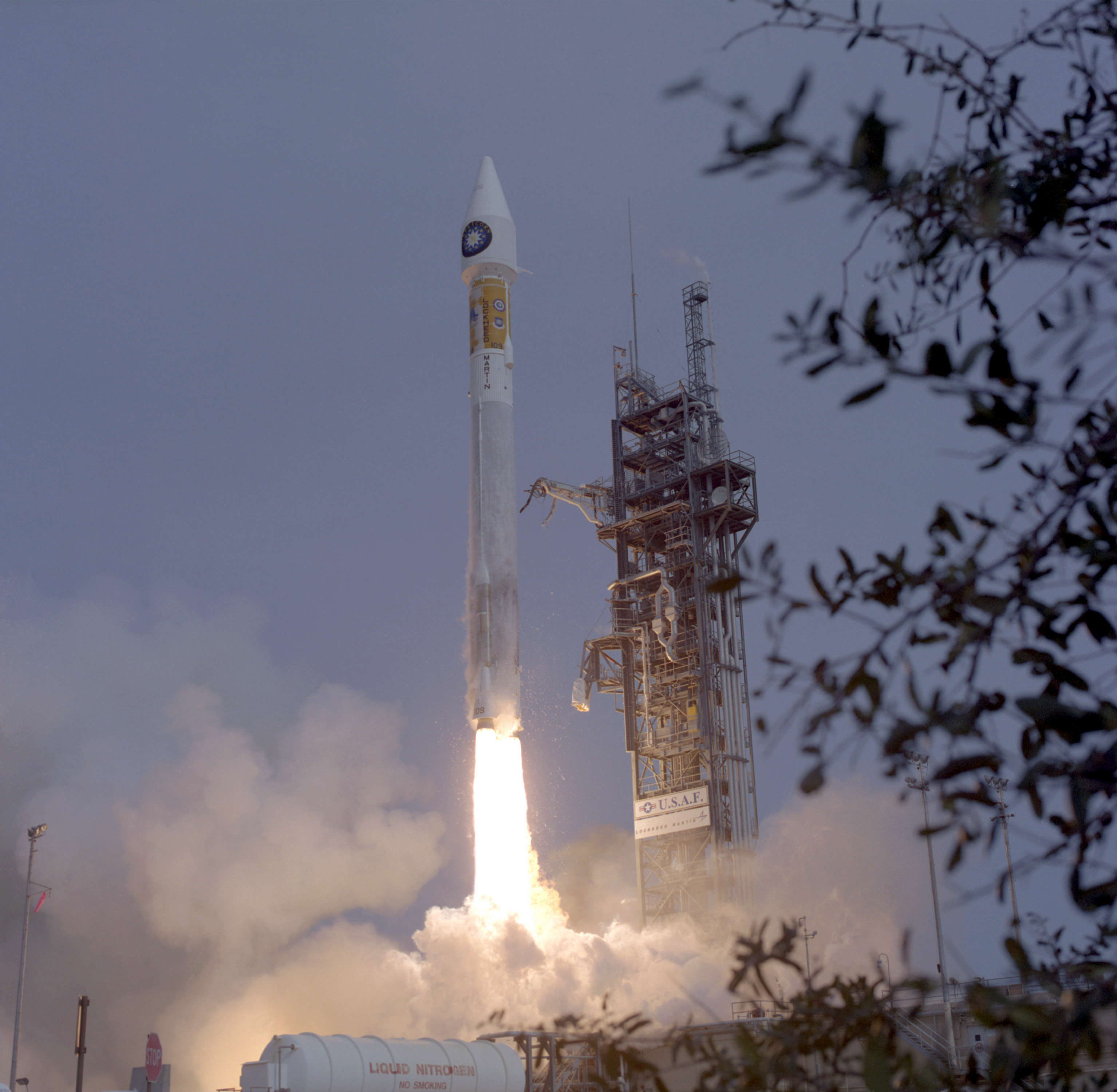
NROL-5 Launch

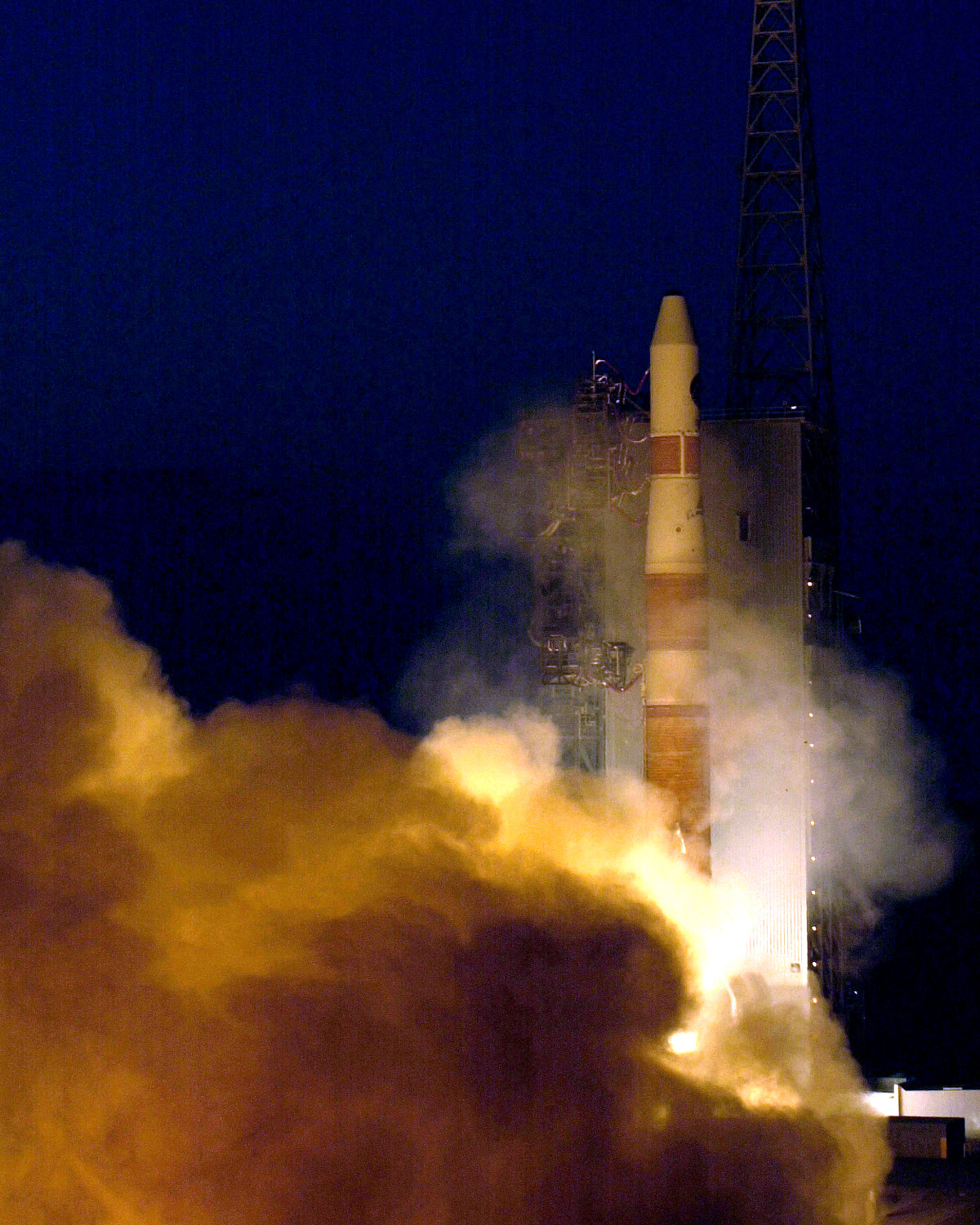
NROL-22 Launch

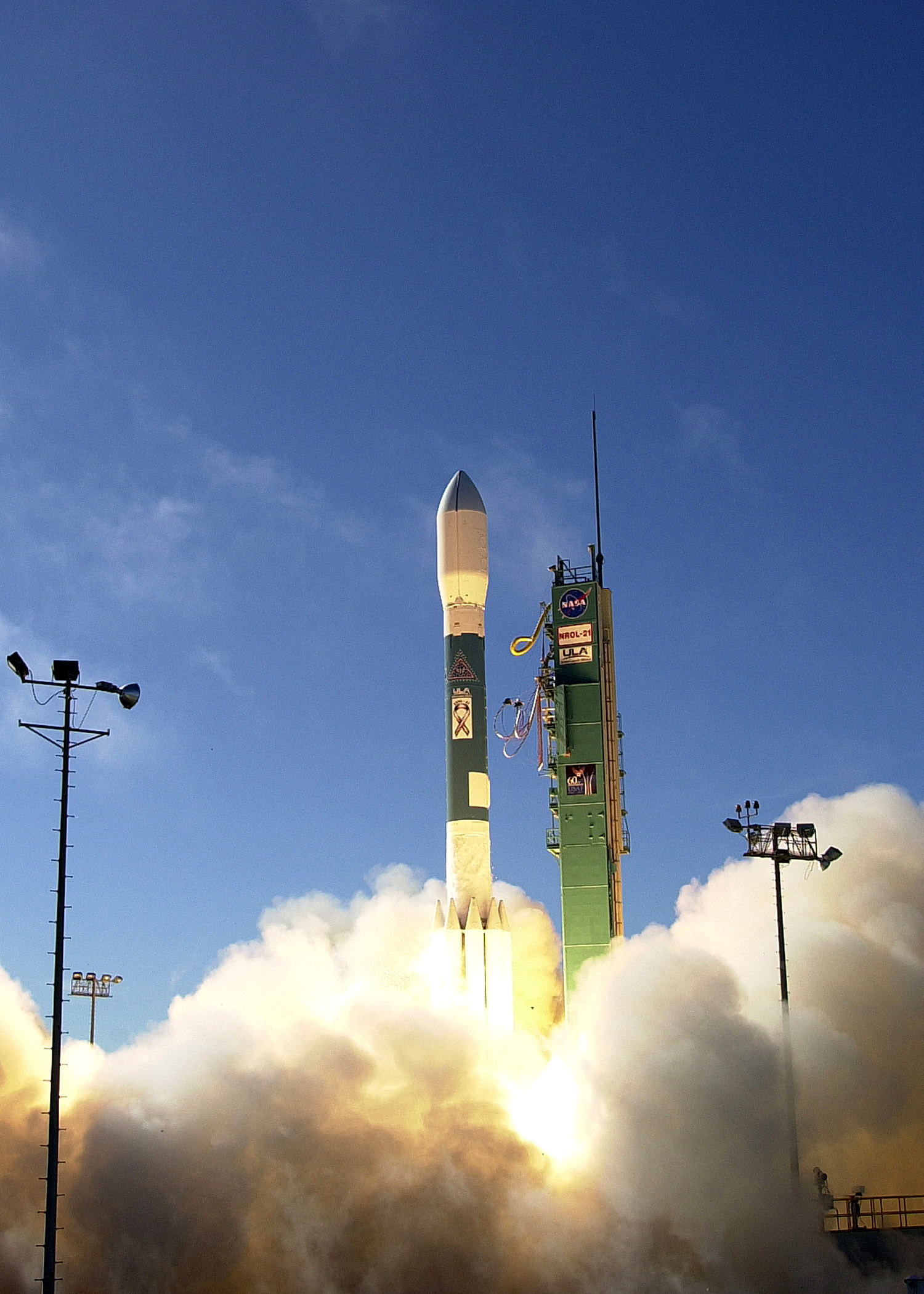
NROL-21 Launch

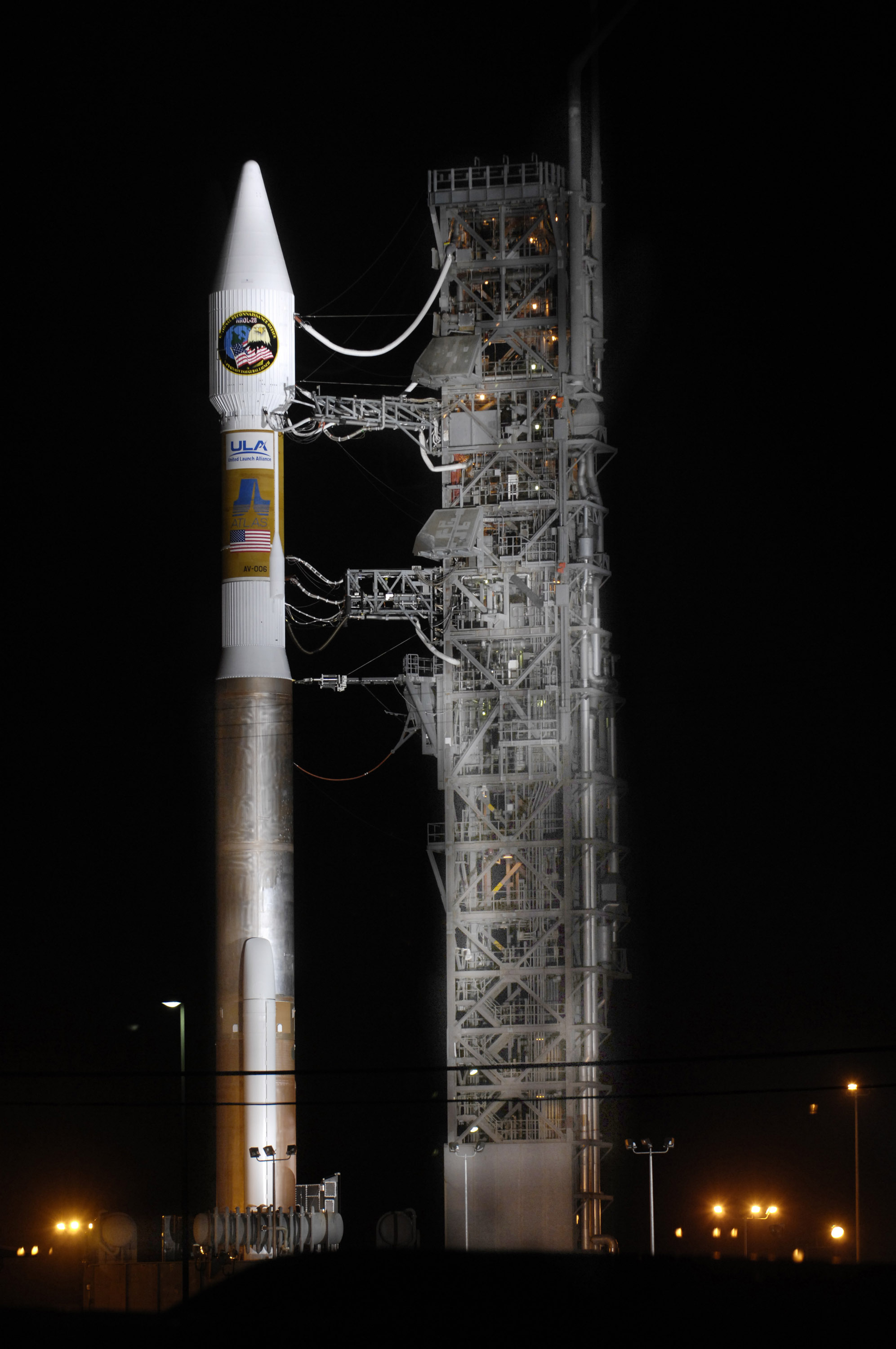
Atlas V 411 before NROL-28 Launch

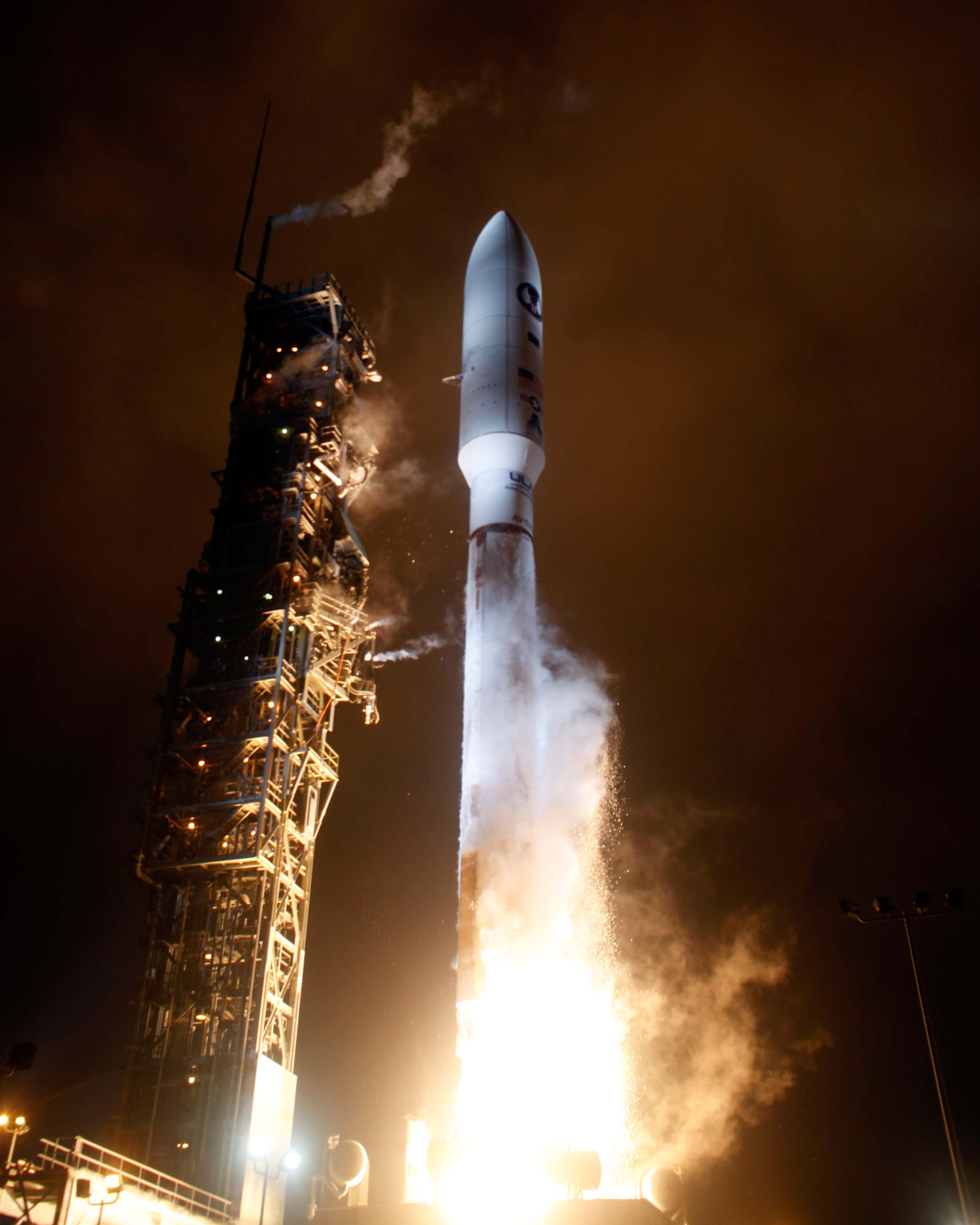
NROL-41 Launch

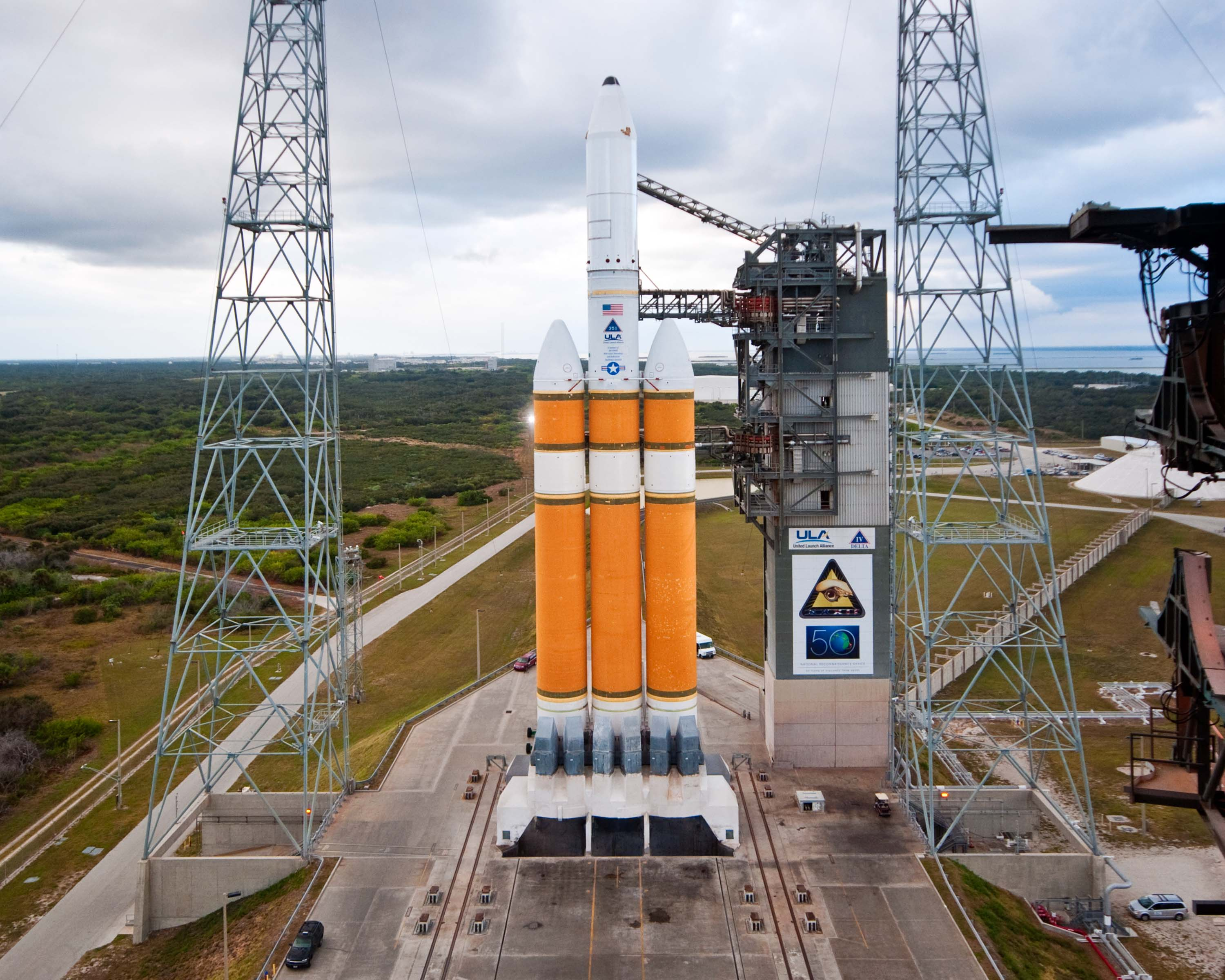
Delta IV Heavy before NROL-32 Launch

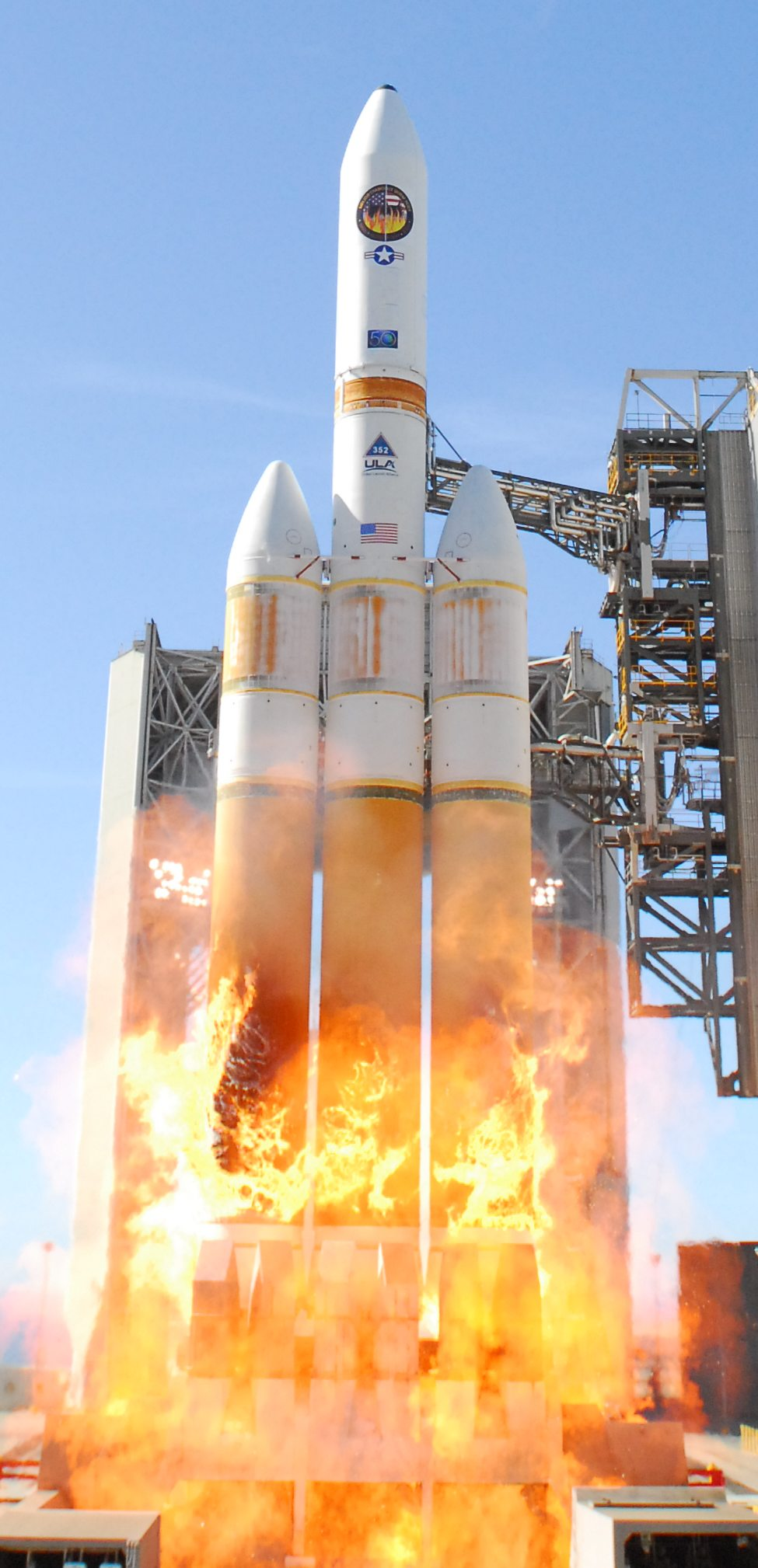
NROL-49 Launch

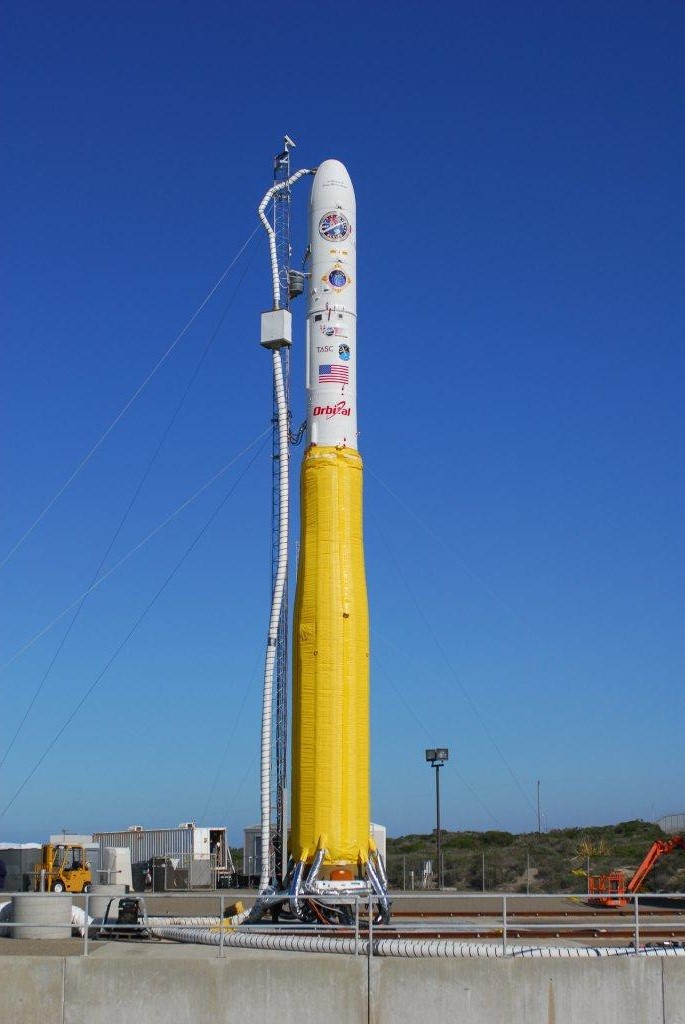
Minotaur I Before NROL-66 Launch

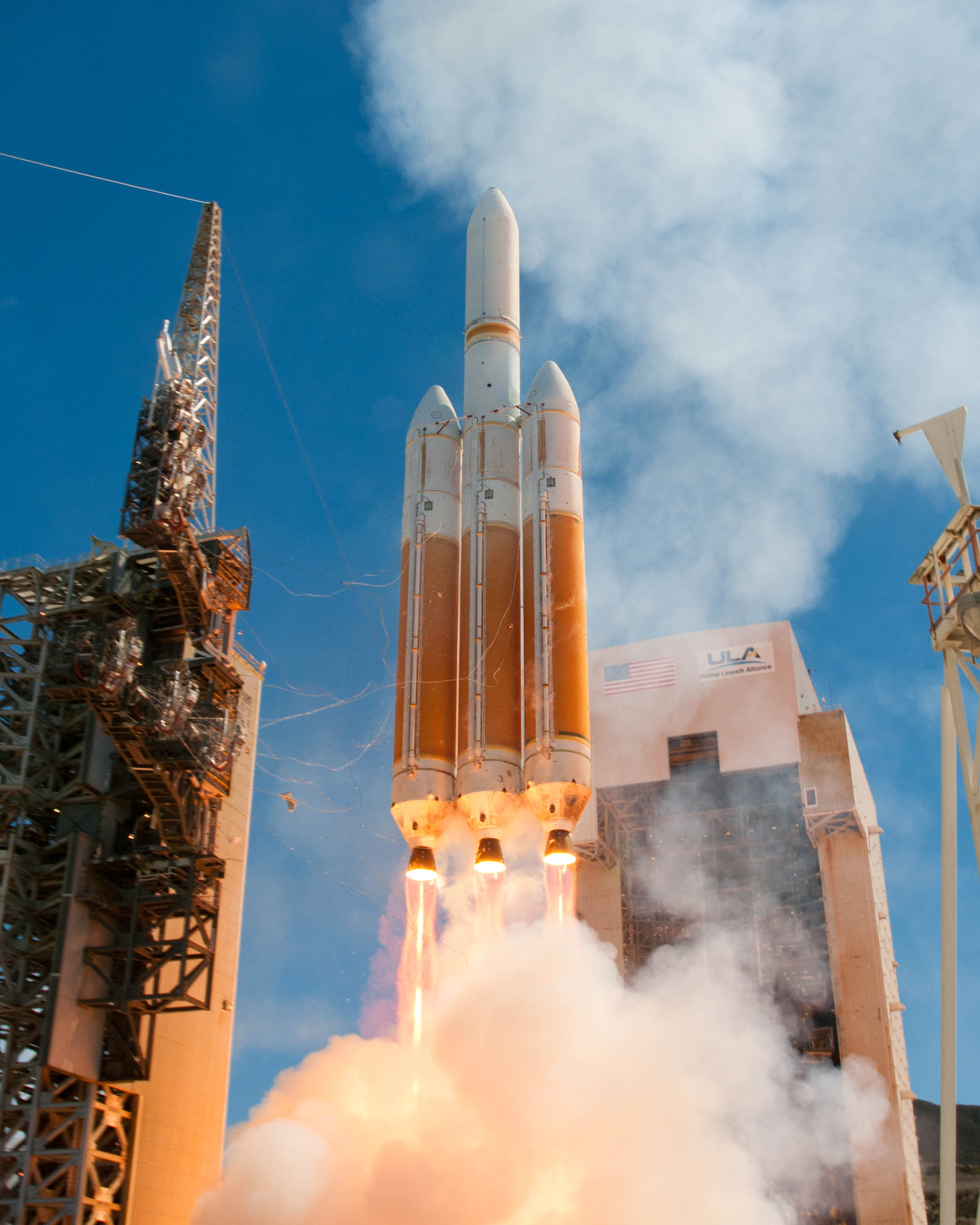
NROL-65 Launch

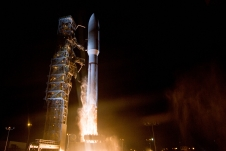
NROL-39 Launch

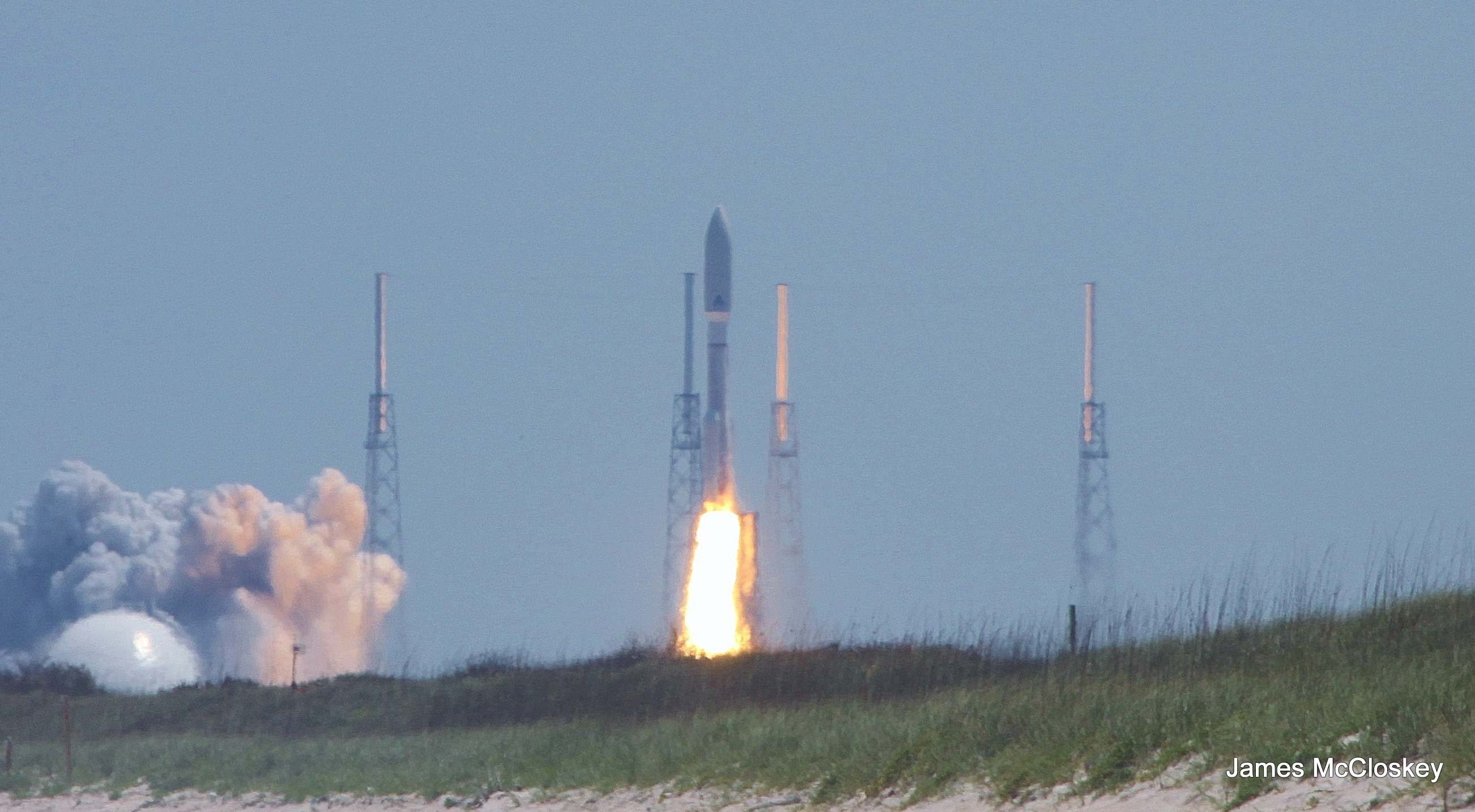
NROL-67 Launch

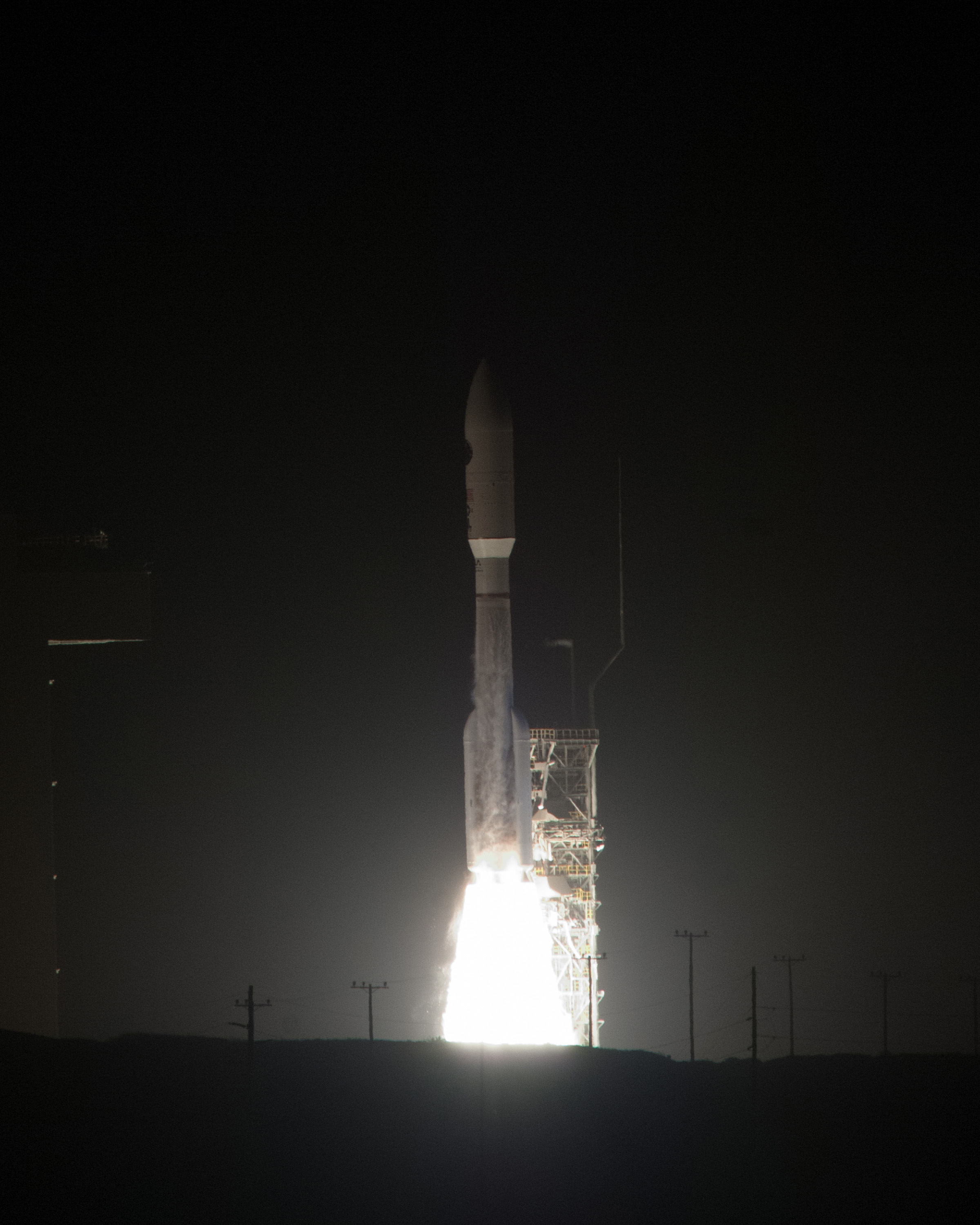
NROL-35 Launch

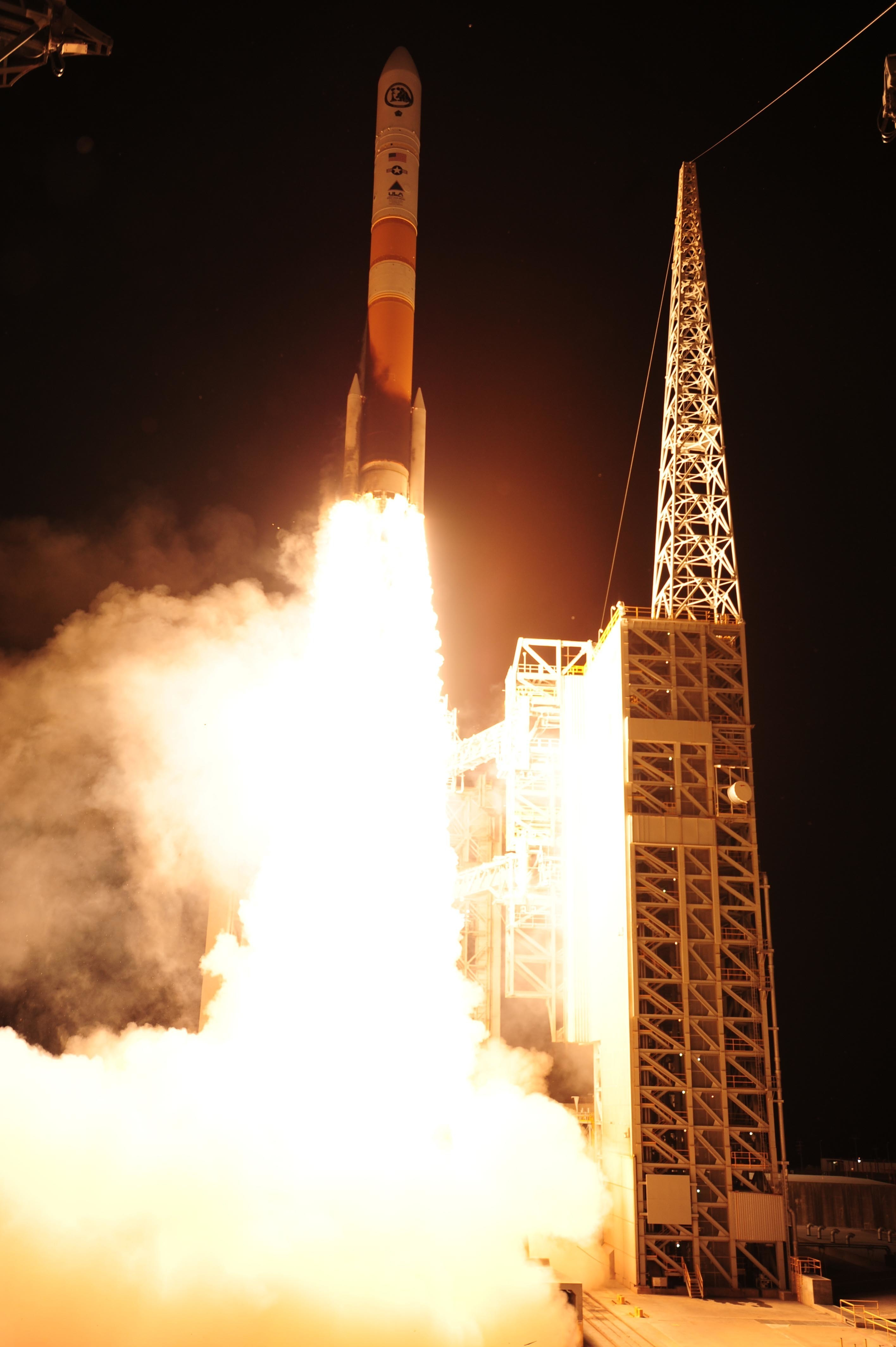
NROL-45 Launch

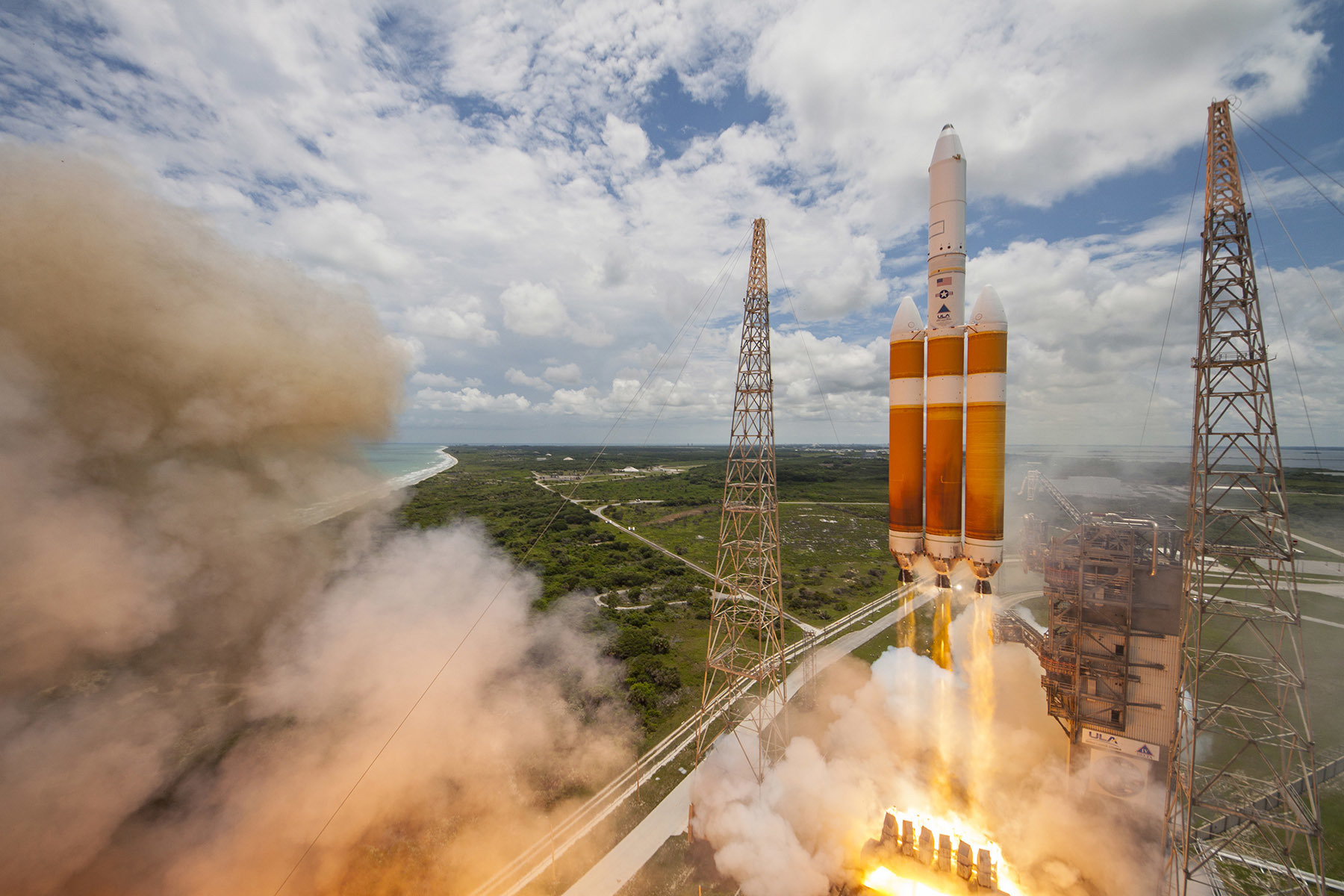
NROL-37 Launch

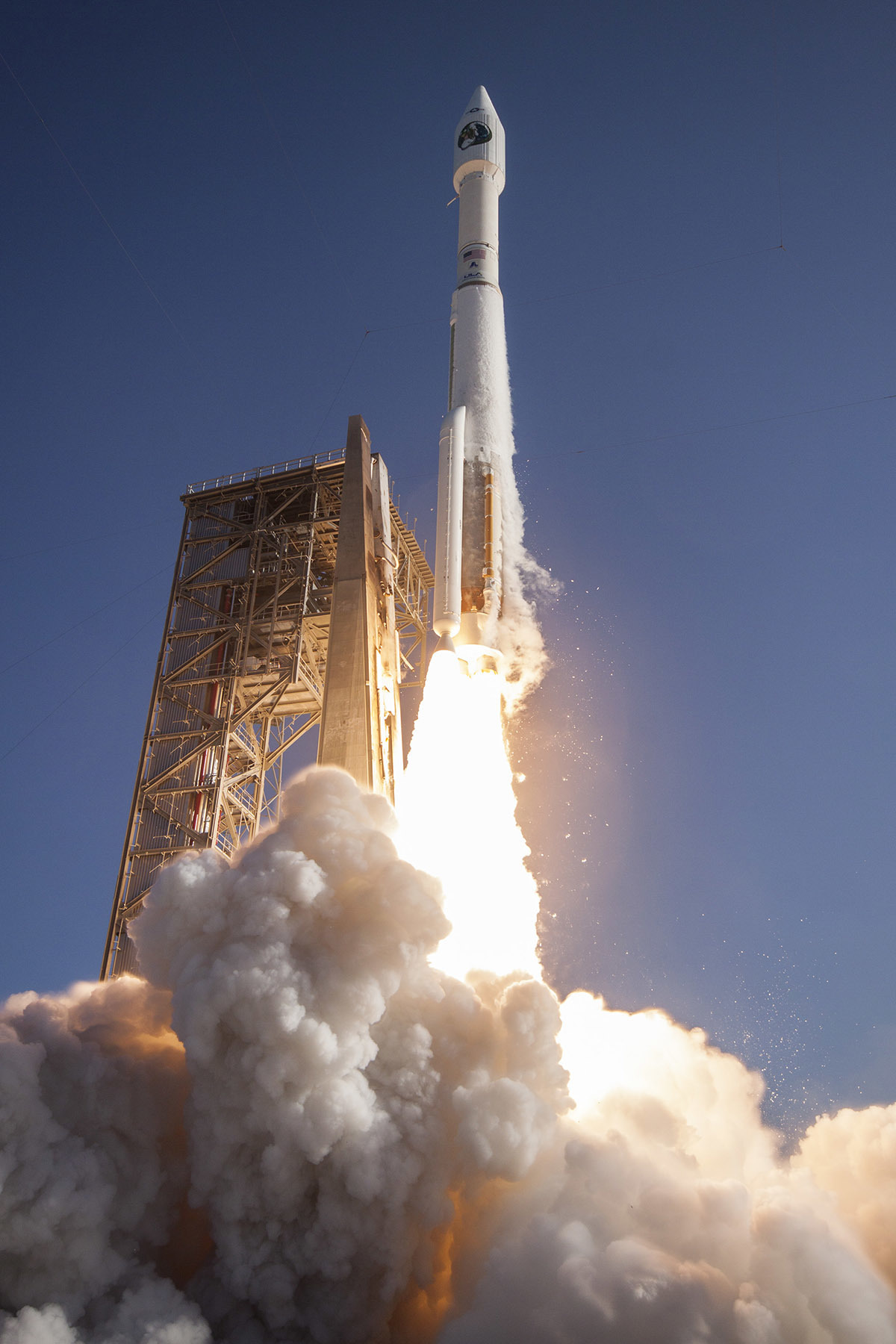
NROL-61 Launch

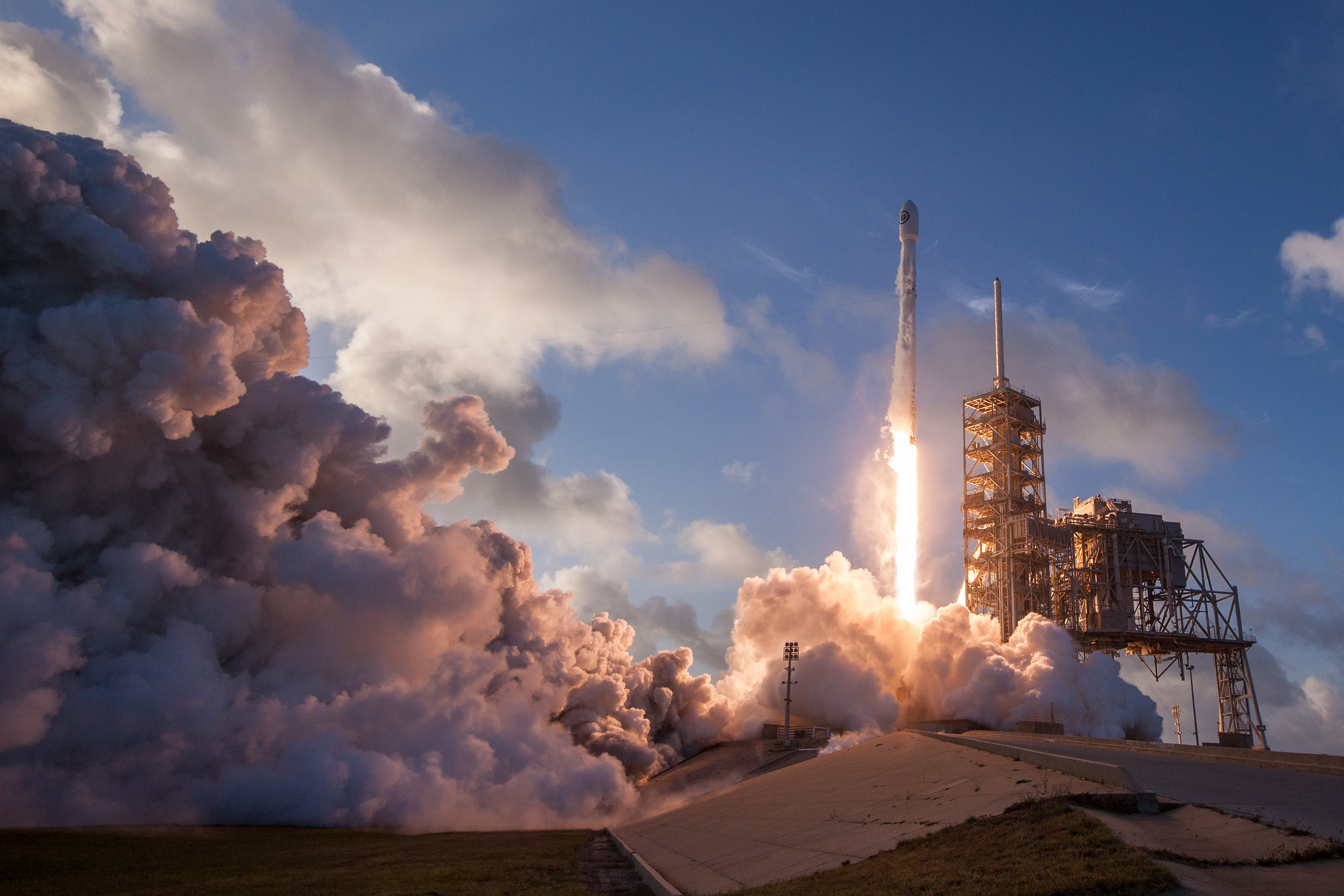
NROL-76 Launch

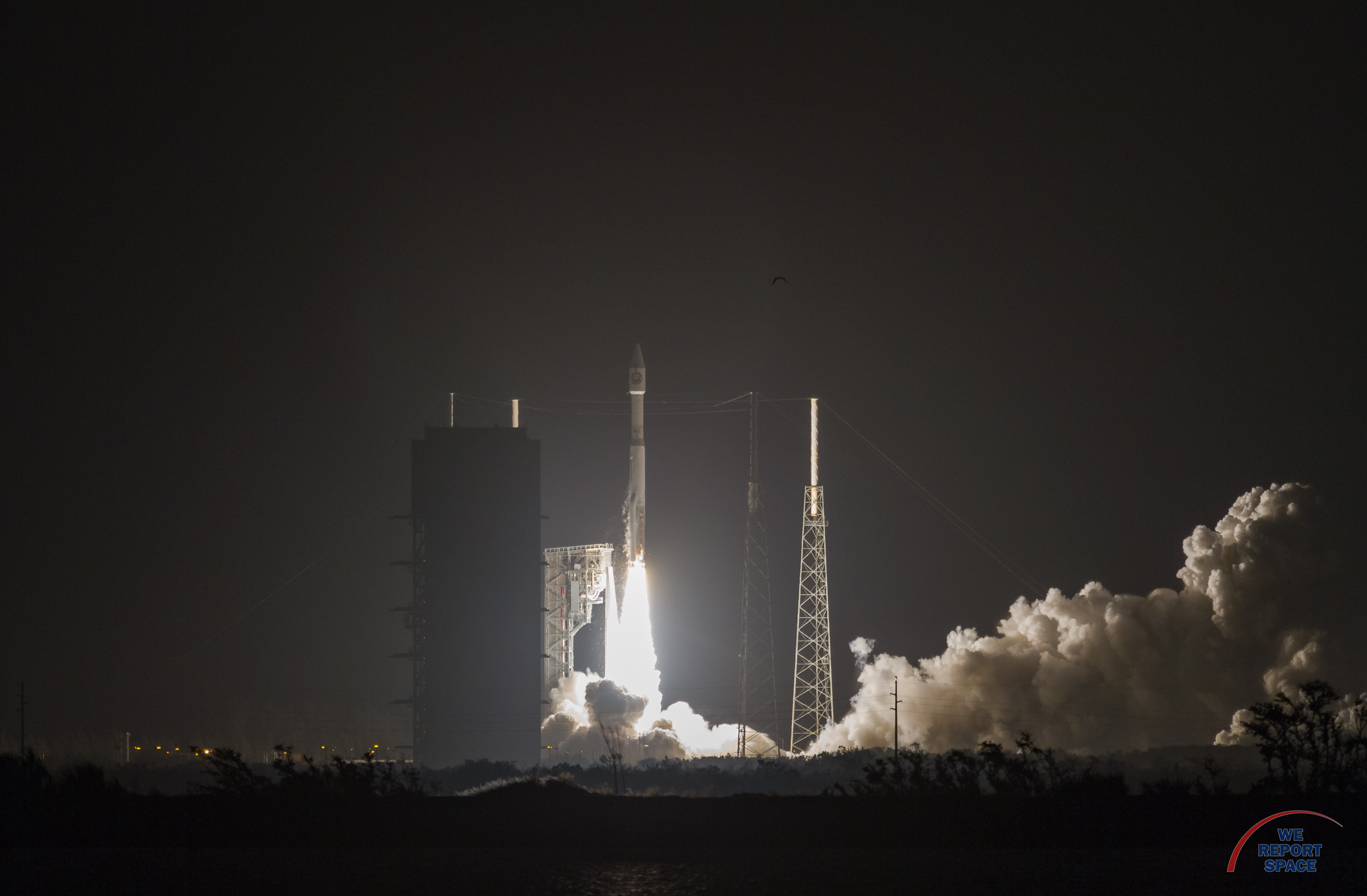
NROL-42 Launch

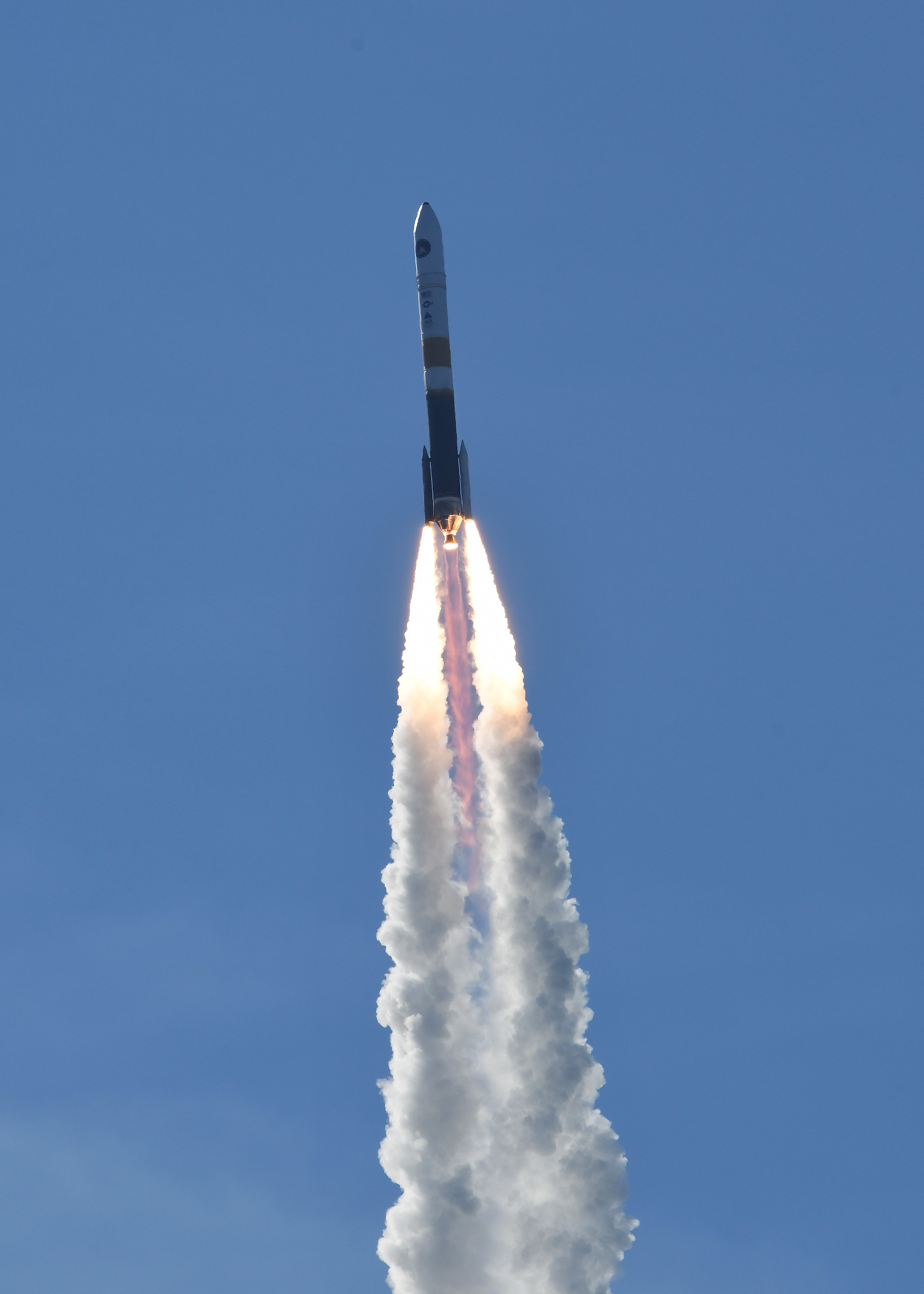
NROL-47 Launch

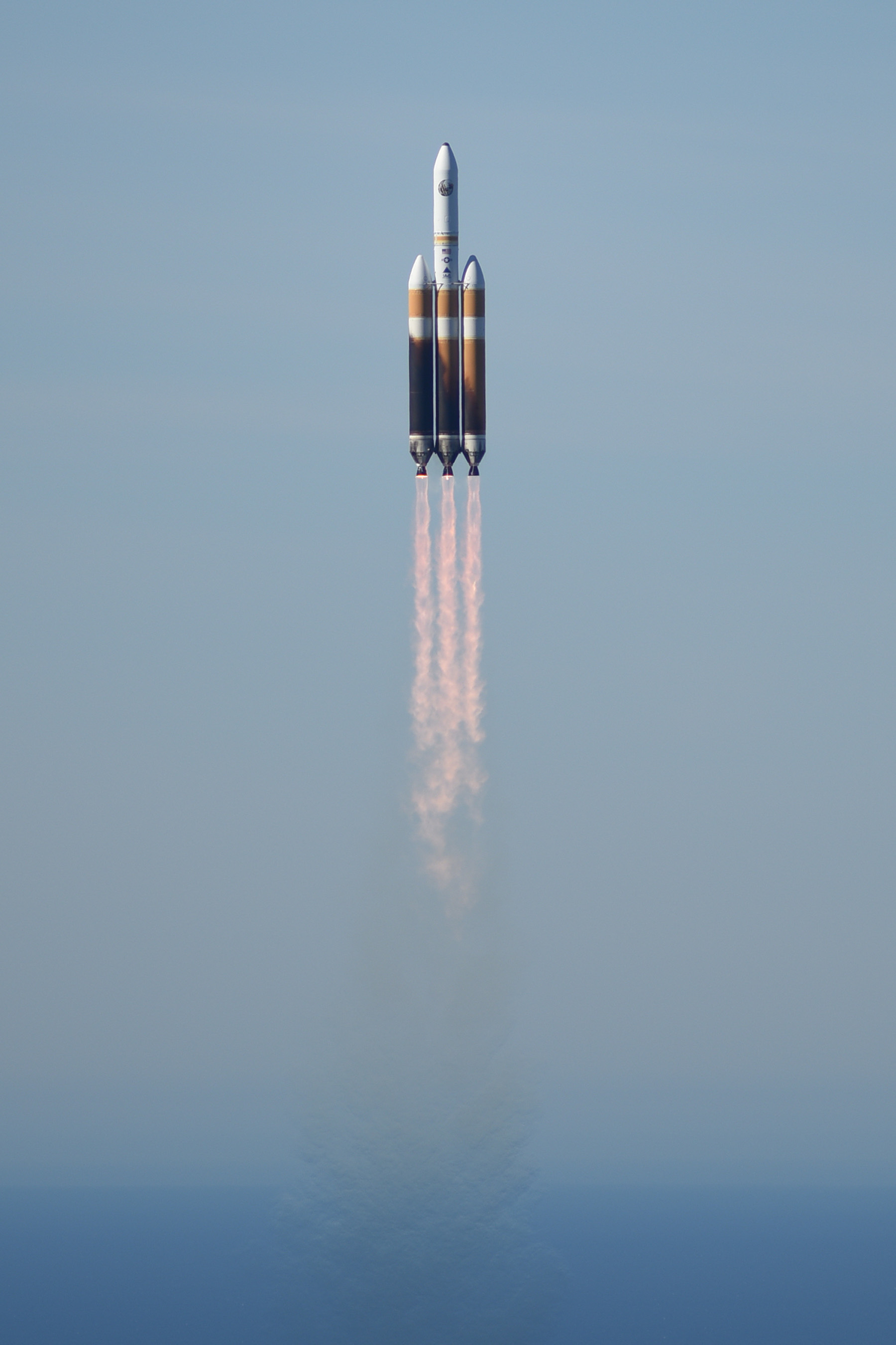
NROL-71 Launch

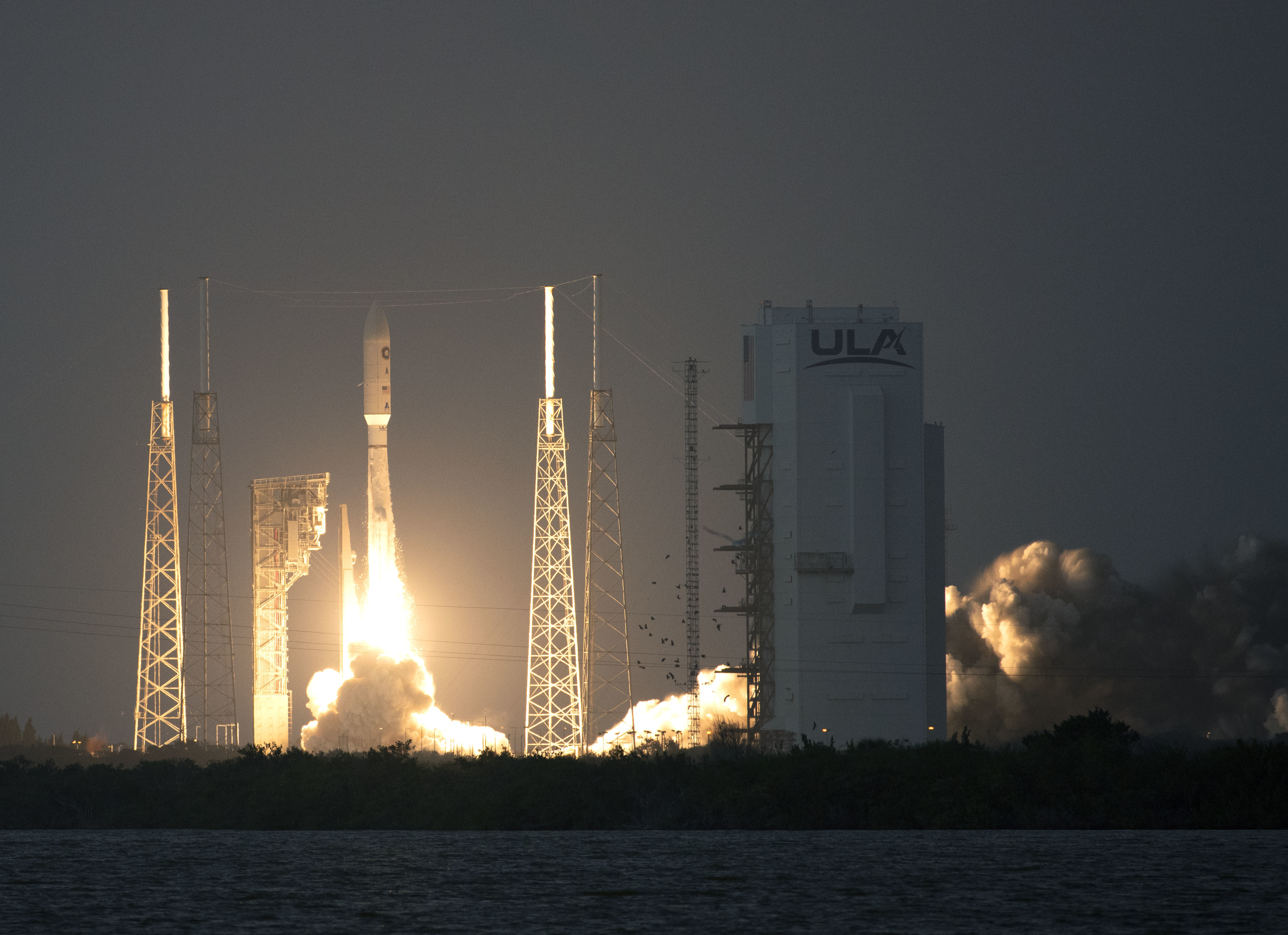
NROL-101 Launch

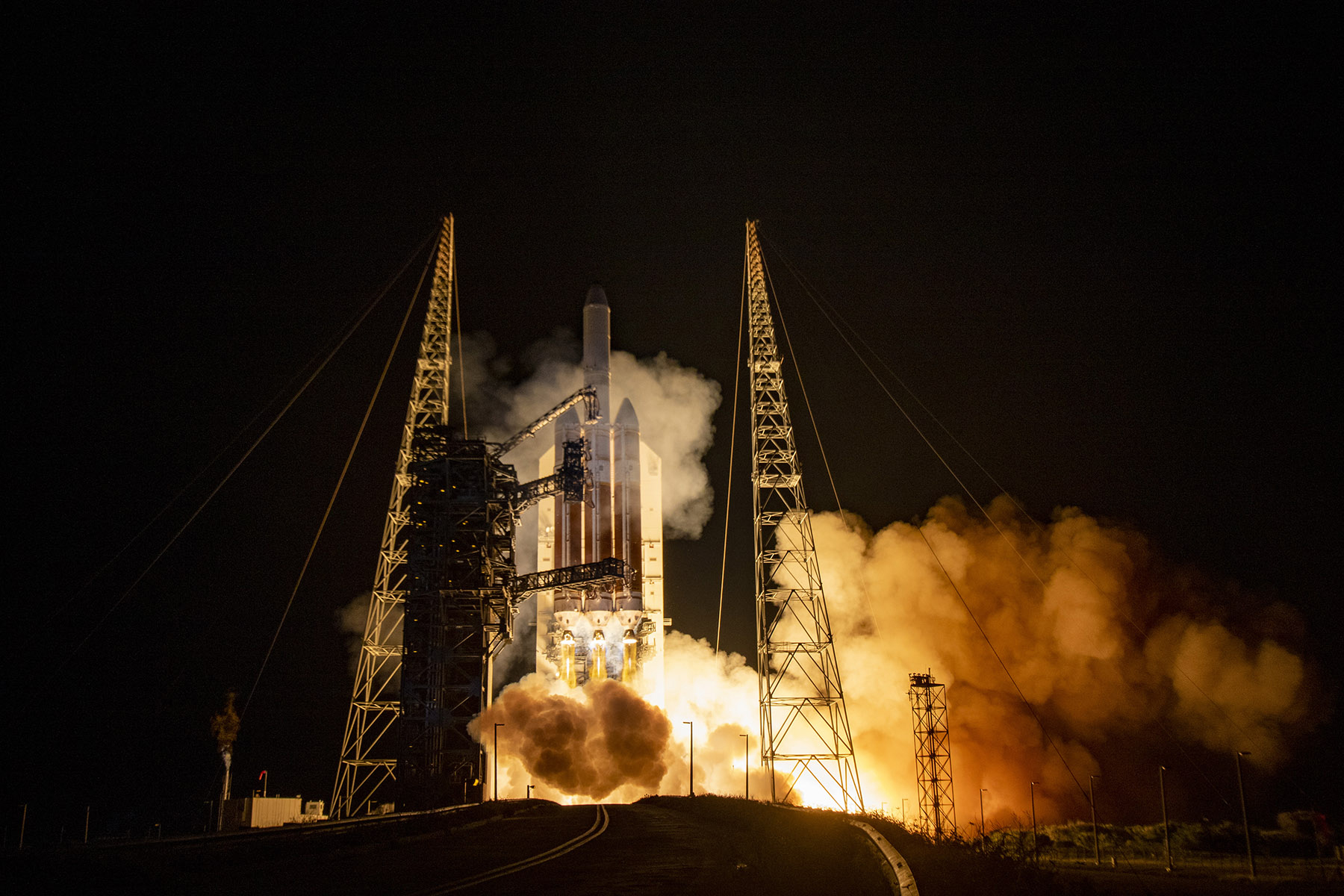
NROL-44 Launch

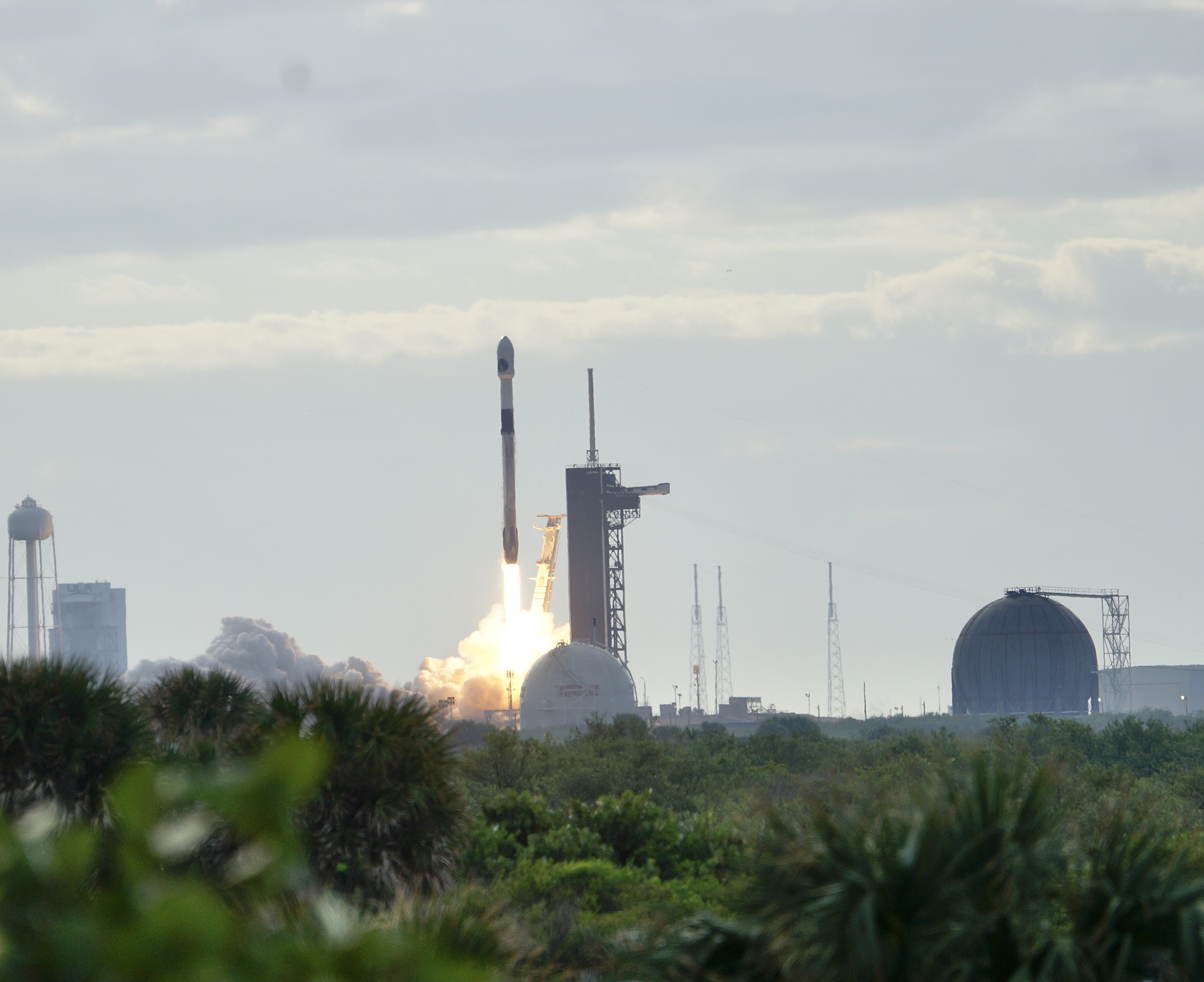
NROL-108 Launch

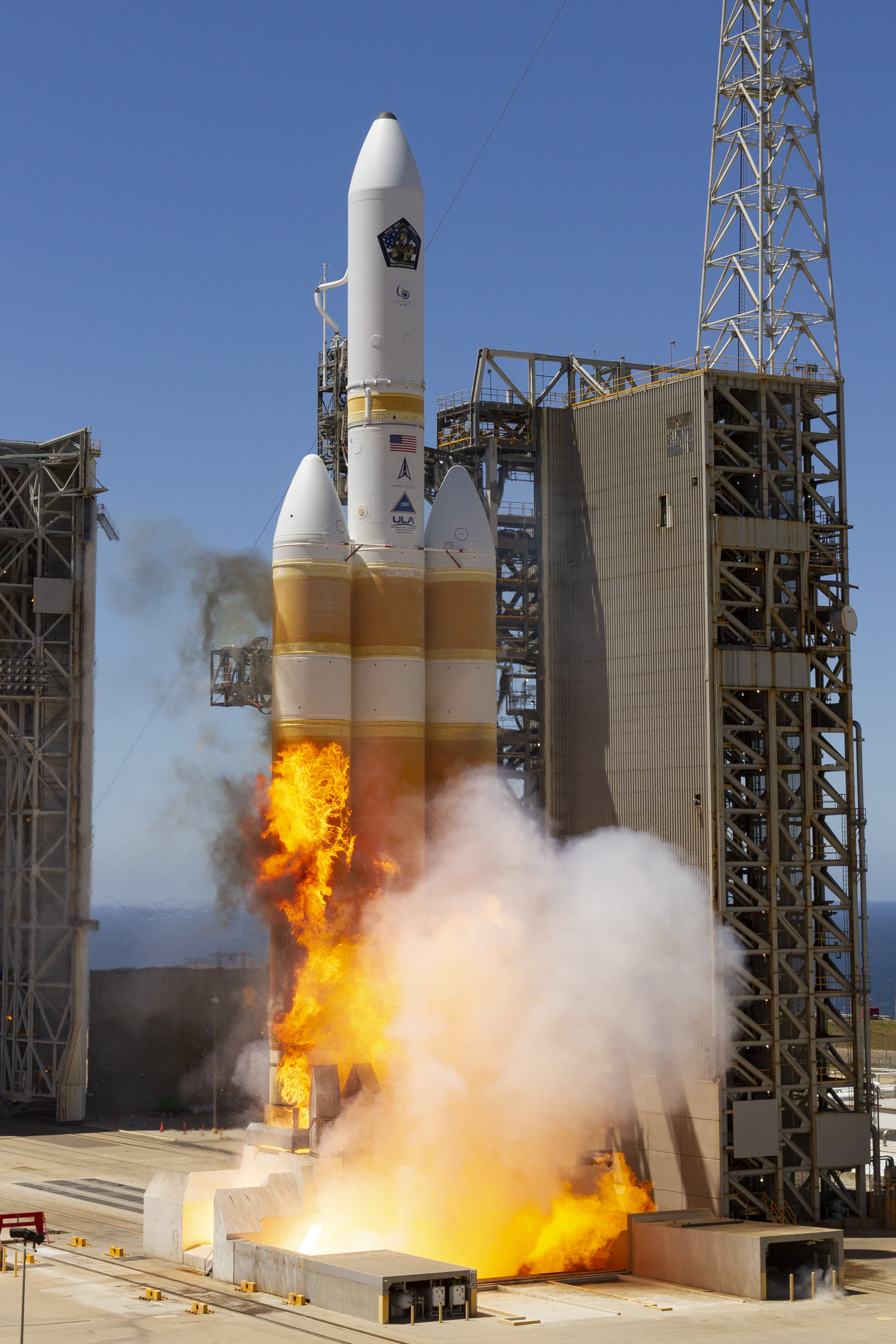
NROL-82 Launch

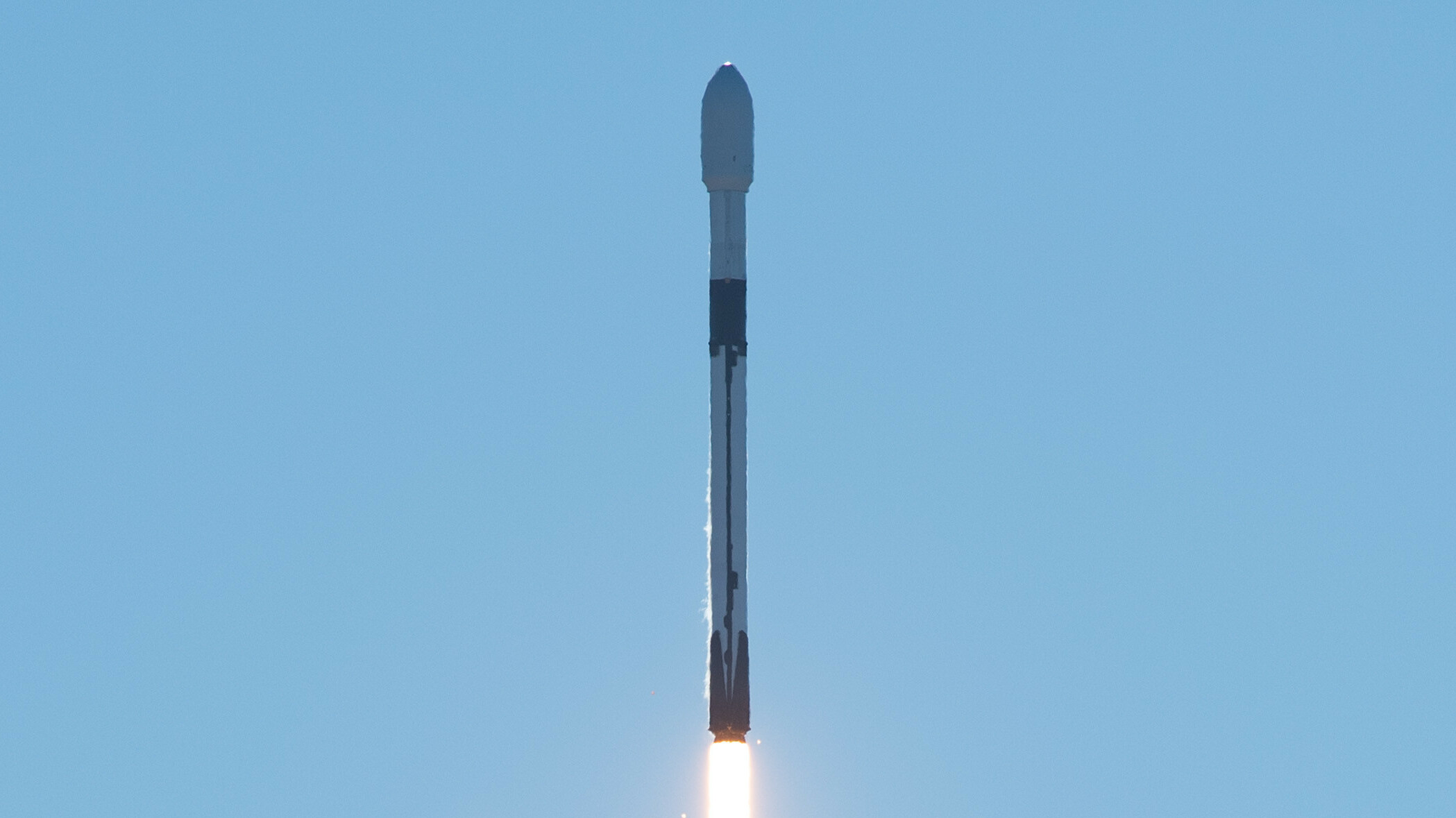
NROL-87 Launch

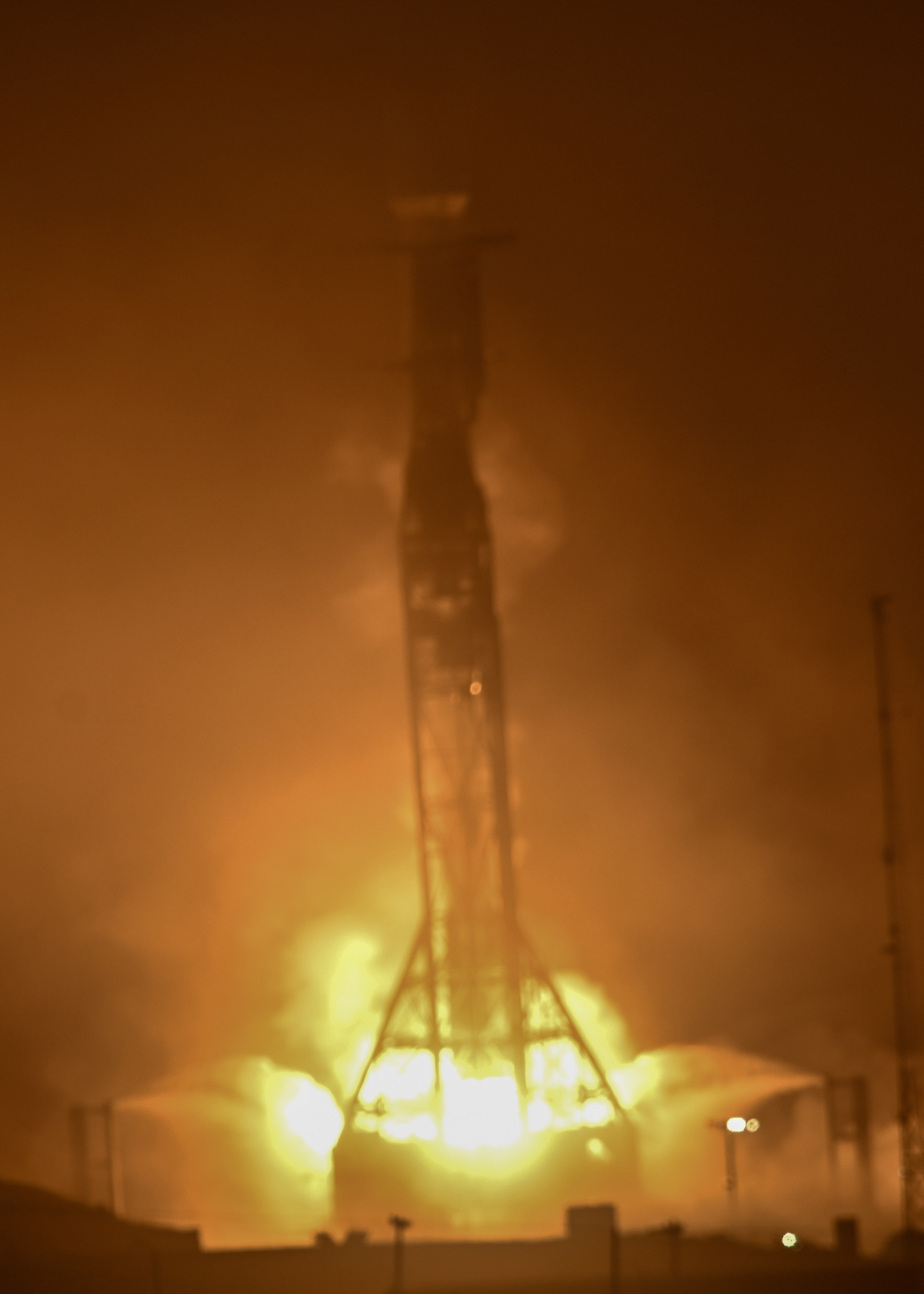
NROL-85 Launch

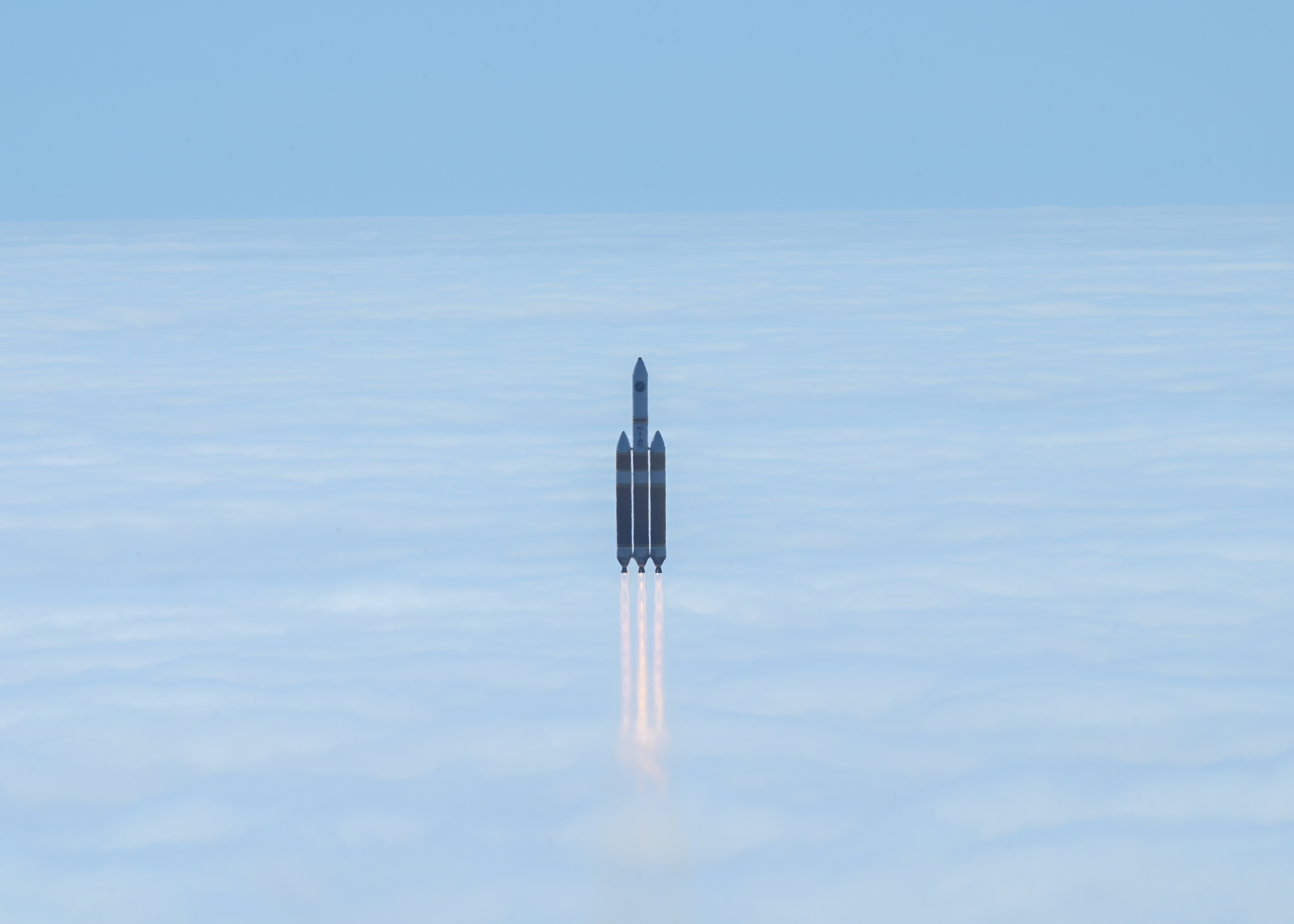
NROL-91 Launch

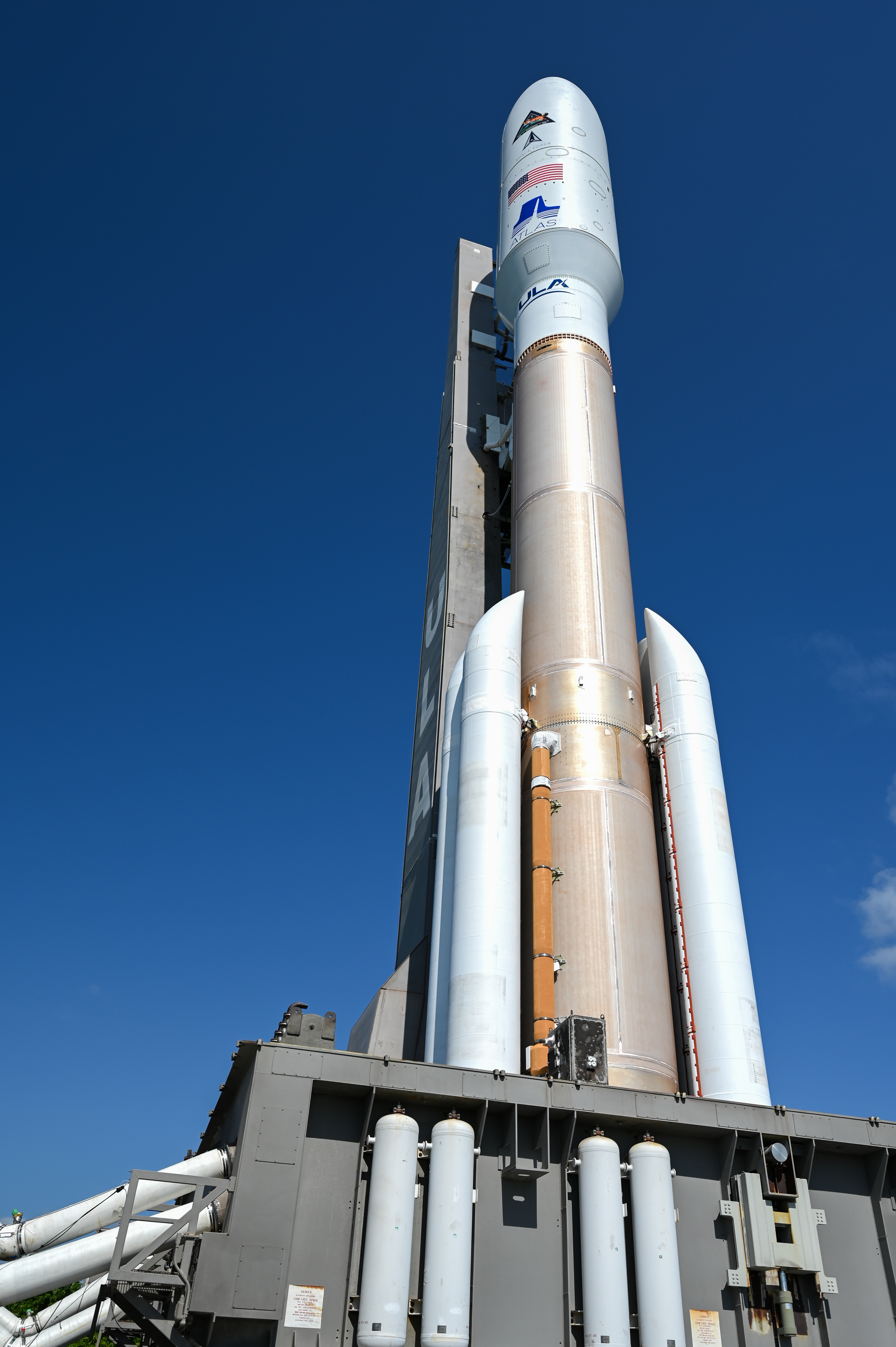
Rollout of Atlas V 511 before NROL-107 Launch

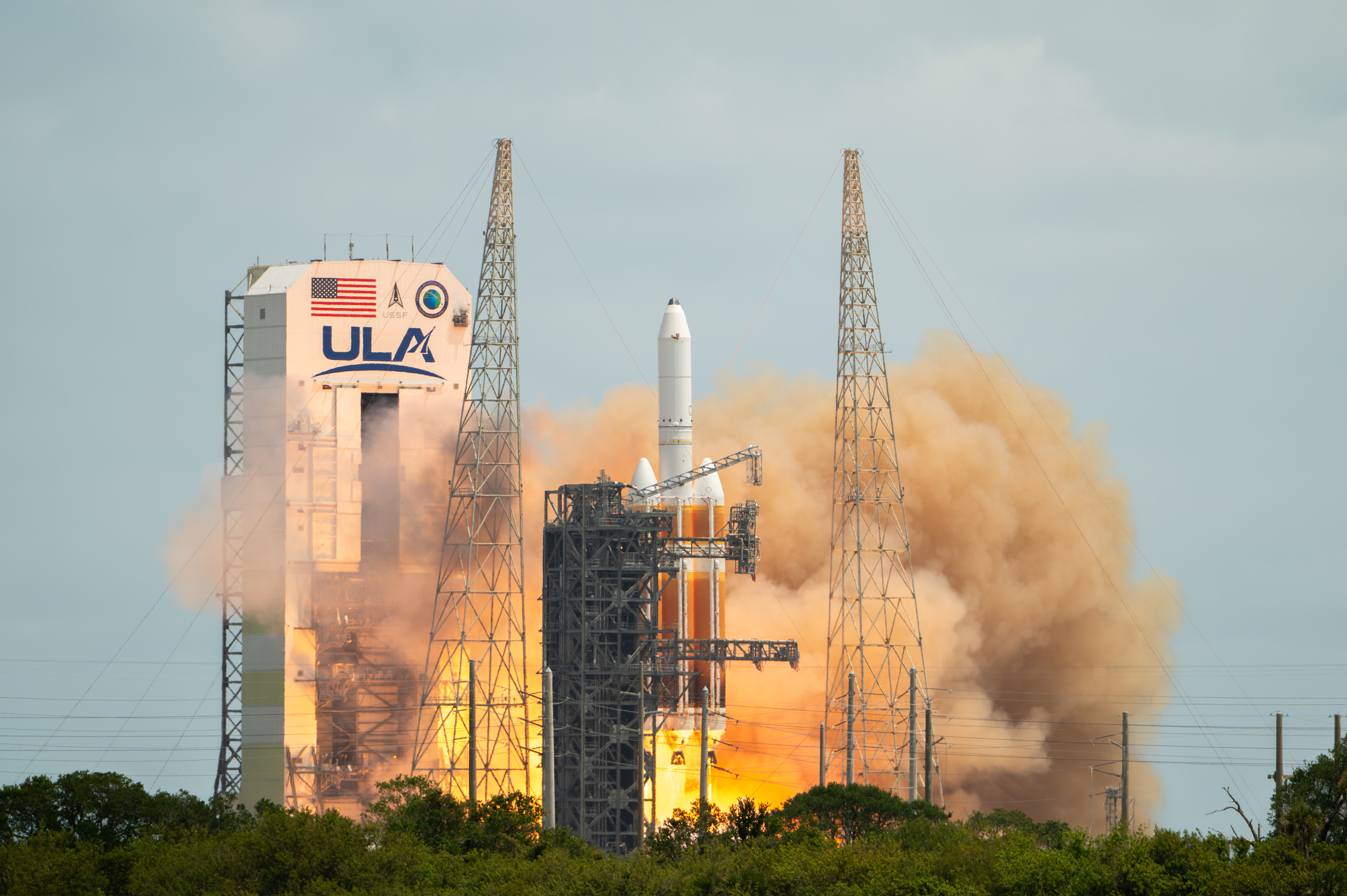
NROL-70 Launch

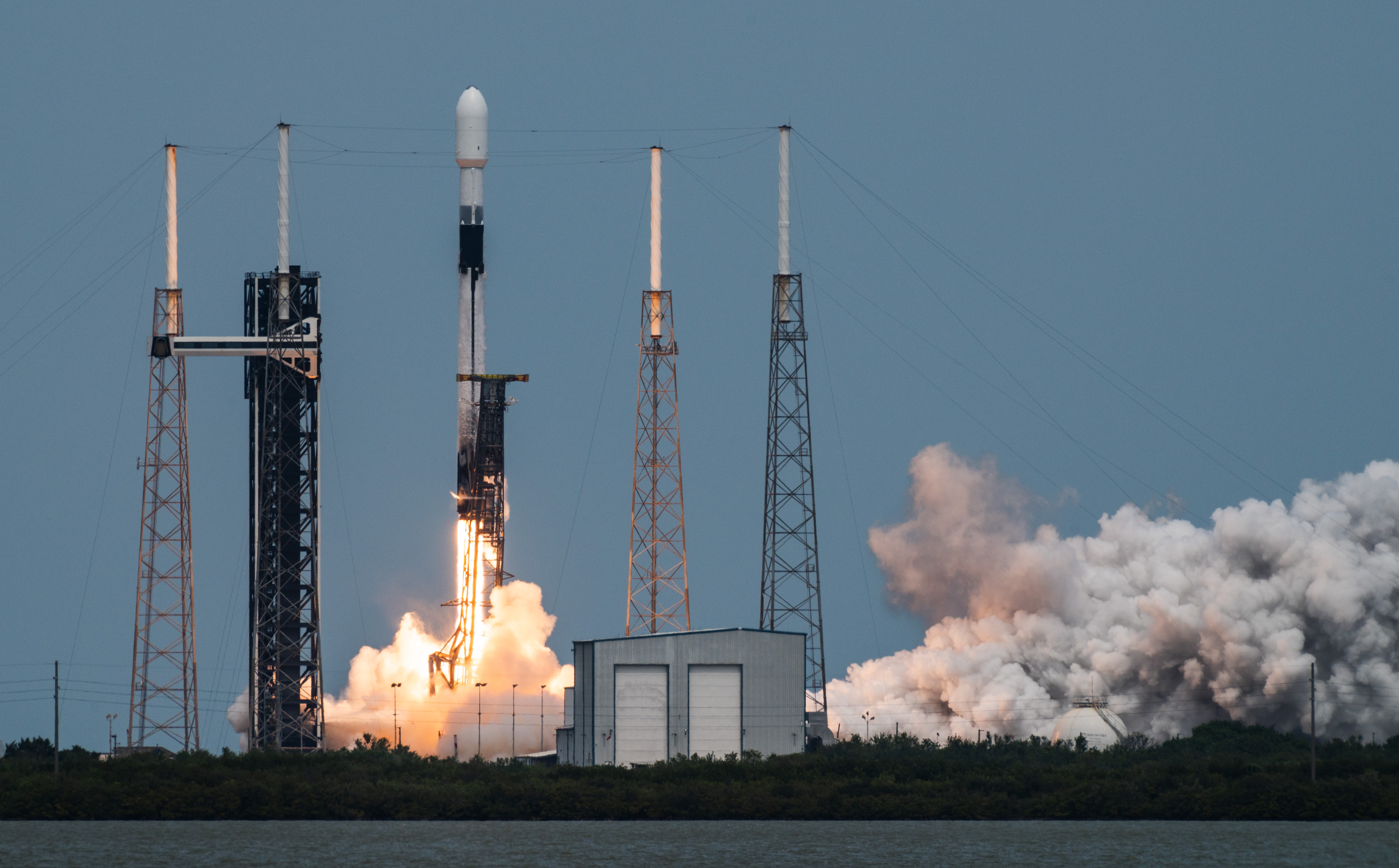
NROL-69 Launch

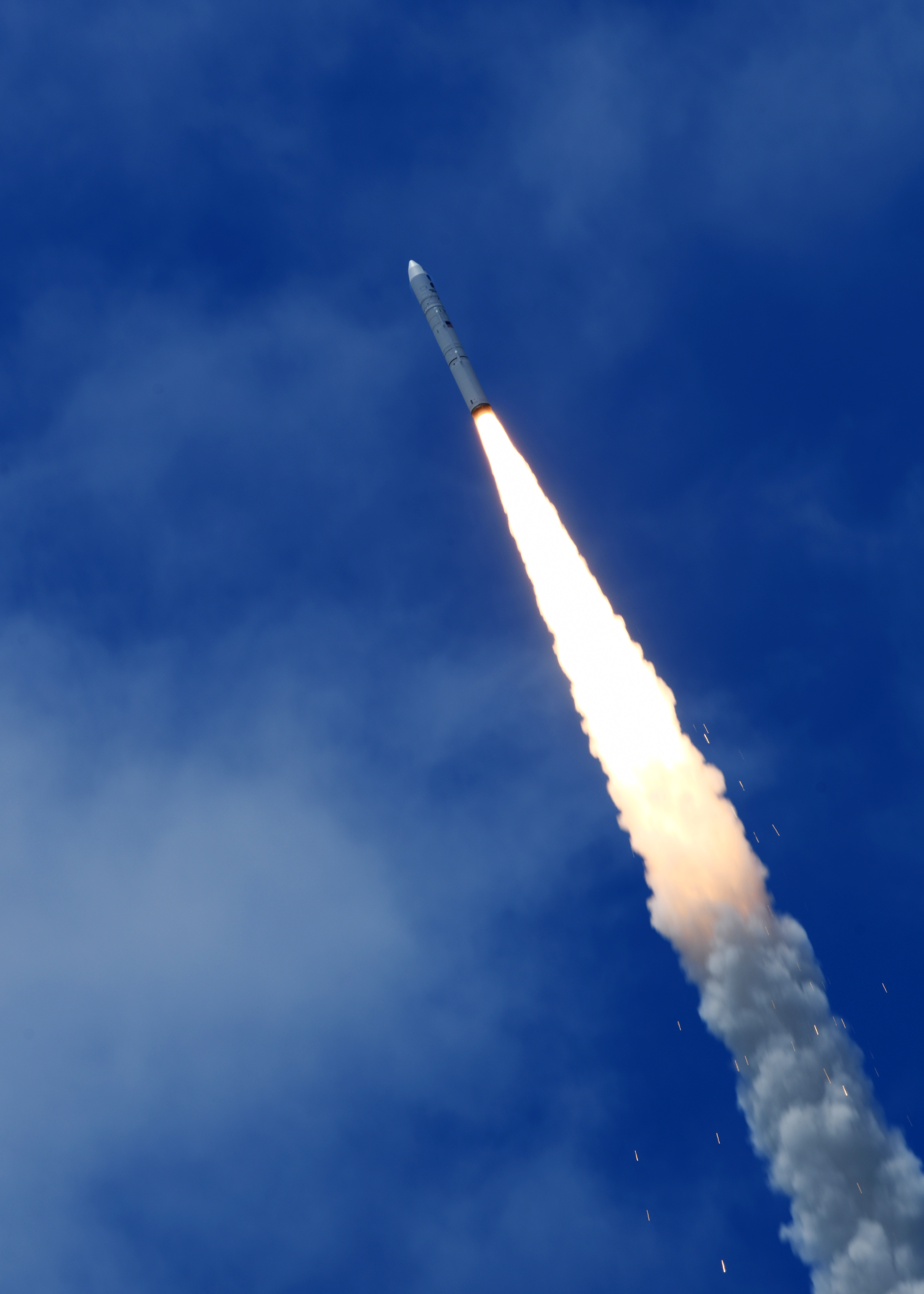
NROL-174 Launch

== See also ==
- NRO Proliferated Architecture Mission
- List of OPS Satellites
- List of USA satellites
- List of USSF launches
- National Security Space Launch#Missions
