= USA-182 =

American reconnaissance satellite

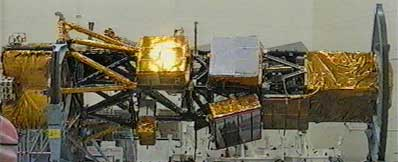
- Onyx Satellite during Integration
- Mission type: Radar Transmission
- Operator: NRO
- COSPAR ID: 2005-016A
- SATCAT no.: 28646
- Mission duration: 9 Years

Spacecraft properties
- Spacecraft type: Onyx
- Manufacturer: Lockheed Martin
- Launch mass: 14,500 - 16,000 Kg

Start of mission
- Launch date: 30 April 2005 00:50 UTC
- Rocket: Titan IV (405)B (B-30)
- Launch site: Cape Canaveral, SLC-40
- Contractor: Lockheed Martin

Orbital parameters
- Reference system: Geocentric orbit
- Regime: Sun-synchronous orbit
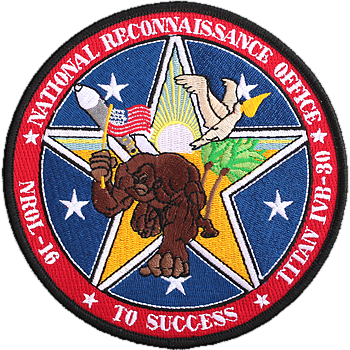
- Onyx Series

USA-182 (also known as Onyx-5, Prometheus and NROL-16) is an American reconnaissance satellite which was operated by the National Reconnaissance Office. Launched in April 2005, it is the last Onyx reconnaissance satellite launch.

== Overview ==
The satellite launched on the last Titan (405)B Version launch and the last Titan IV from the Cape Canaveral Air Force Station

Onyx also called Lacrosse is a Radar type reconnaissance satellite used by NRO and has a resolution of 1 meter. FIA-R (Topaz) is the Successor of Onyx satellite.

== See also ==
- List of USA satellites
- List of NRO Launches
