= Vandenberg Space Launch Complex 4 =

Rocket launch complex at Vandenberg Space Force Base in the United States

Space Launch Complex 4
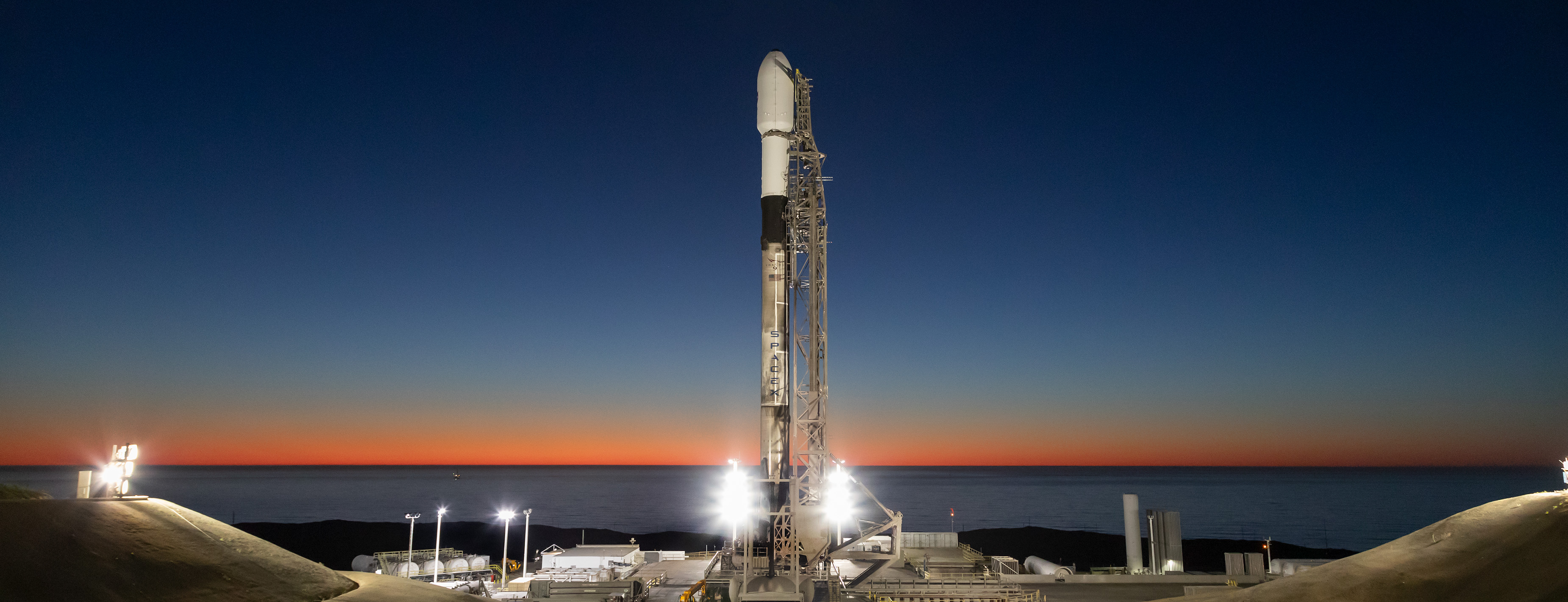
- SLC-4 with Falcon 9 Block 5 on launch pad at SLC-4E in March 2025 before the launch of SPHEREx and PUNCH
- Interactive map of Space Launch Complex 4
- Launch site: Vandenberg Space Force Base
- Location: 34.633°N 120.613°W
- Time zone: UTC−08:00 (PST)
  - Summer (DST): UTC−07:00 (PDT)
- Short name: SLC-4
- Operator: United States Space Force (owner); SpaceX (tenant)
- Total launches: 403
- Launch pad: 2 (1 became a landing zone for Falcon 9)
- Orbital inclination range: 55–145°
SLC-4 (PALC-2-4 / SLC-4E) launch history
- Status: Active
- Launches: 310
- First launch: 14 August 1964; Atlas-Agena D (KH-7 Gambit 4010)
- Last launch: 22 November 2026; Falcon 9 Block 5 (NROL-136)
- Associated rockets: Current: Falcon 9; Retired: Atlas-Agena, Atlas SLV-3, Titan IIID, Titan 34D, Titan IV
LZ-4 (PALC-2-3 / SLC-4W) landing history
- Status: Active
- Landings: 38 (38 successful, 0 failure)
- First landing: 7 October 2018; Falcon 9 Block 5 (SAOCOM 1A)
- Last landing: 22 November 2026; Falcon 9 Block 5 (NROL-136)
- Associated rockets: Current: Falcon 9
SLC-4W (PALC-2-3) launch history
- Status: Repurposed
- Launches: 93
- First launch: 12 July 1963; Atlas-Agena D (KH-7 Gambit 4001)
- Last launch: 18 October 2003; Titan 23G (USA-172 / DMSP)
- Associated rockets: Retired: Atlas-Agena, Atlas SLV-3, Titan IIIB, Titan 23G

Launch sites at Vandenberg Space Force Base
Active pads
Active pads not used for launches
Inactive leased pads
Inactive unleased pads
1 SLC-1E
2 SLC-1W
3 SLC-2E
4 SLC-2W
5 SLC-10E
6 SLC-10W
7 LC-576E
8 SLC-9
9 SLC-3E
10 SLC-3W
11 SLC-4E
12 SLC-4W (LZ-4)
13 SLC-5
14 SLC-6
15 SLC-8
16 SLC-7
17 SLC-11
18 SLC-12
19 SLC-14
20 SLC-15

Space Launch Complex 4 (SLC-4) is a launch and landing site at Vandenberg Space Force Base, California, U.S. It has two pads, both of which are used by SpaceX for Falcon 9, one for launch operations, and the other as Landing Zone 4 (LZ-4) for SpaceX landings.

The complex was previously used by Atlas and Titan rockets between 1963 and 2005. It consisted of two launch pads: Space Launch Complex 4 West (SLC-4W, formerly PALC-2-3) and Space Launch Complex 4 East (SLC-4E, formerly PALC-2-4). Both pads were built for use by Atlas-Agena rockets, but were later rebuilt to handle Titan rockets. The designation SLC-4 was applied at the time of the conversion to launch Titan launch vehicles.

Both pads at Space Launch Complex 4 are currently leased by SpaceX. SLC-4E is leased as a launch site for the Falcon 9 rocket, which first flew from Vandenberg on 29 September 2013, following a 24-month refurbishment program which had started in early 2011. SpaceX began a five-year lease of Launch Complex 4 West in February 2015 in order to use that area as a landing pad to bring back VTVL return-to-launch-site (RTLS) first-stage boosters of the reusable Falcon 9 launch vehicle. That pad was later named by SpaceX as Landing Zone 4 and first used operationally for a Falcon 9 booster landing in 2018.

== SLC-4E ==
=== Atlas-Agena ===
The first launch from PALC2-4 occurred on 14 August 1964, when a KH-7 satellite was launched by an Atlas-Agena D. After 27 Atlas-Agena launches, the last of which was on 4 June 1967, the complex was deactivated.

=== Titan IIID ===
During 1971 the complex was reactivated and refurbished for use by the Martin Marietta Titan III launch vehicles. The Titan IIID made its maiden flight from SLC-4E on 15 June 1971, launching the first KH-9 Hexagon satellite. The first KH-11 Kennan satellite was launched from the complex on 19 December 1976. All 22 Titan IIIDs were launched from SLC-4E, with the last occurring on 17 November 1982.

=== Titan 34D ===
The complex was then refurbished to accommodate the Martin Marietta Titan 34D. Seven Titan 34Ds were launched between 20 June 1983, and 6 November 1988. SLC-4E hosted one of the most dramatic launch accidents in US history when a Titan 34D-9 carrying a KH-9 photoreconnaissance satellite exploded a few hundred feet above the pad on 18 April 1986. The enormous blast showered the launch complex with debris and toxic propellant (hydrazine and dinitrogen tetroxide), resulting in extensive damage. 16 months after the accident, the pad was back in commission when it hosted a successful launch of a KH-11 satellite.

=== Titan IV ===
The last Titan variant to use the complex was the Titan IV, starting on 8 March 1991, with the launch of Lacrosse 2. On 19 October 2005, the last flight of a Titan rocket occurred, when a Titan IVB was launched from SLC-4E, with an Improved Crystal satellite. Following this launch, the complex was deactivated, having been used for 68 launches.

=== Falcon 9 ===
SpaceX refurbished SLC–4E for Falcon 9 launches in a 24-month process that began in early 2011. The draft environmental impact assessment with a finding of "no significant impact" was published in February 2011. Demolition began on the pad's fixed and mobile service towers in summer 2011.

By late 2012, SpaceX anticipated that the initial launch from the Vandenberg pad would be in 2013, with the larger variant Falcon 9 v1.1. As the pad was nearing completion in February 2013, the first launch was scheduled for summer 2013, but was delayed until September 2013.

== SLC-4W ==
SLC-4W started operations in 1963 as Space Launch Complex 4W, and continued as an operational launch site through 2003. In 2015, SpaceX started conversion of the launch site into Landing Zone LZ-4. Landing operations commenced in 2018 at LZ-4.

=== Atlas-Agena ===
The first launch to use what is now SLC-4 occurred on 12 July 1963, when an Atlas LV-3 Agena-D launched the first KH-7 Gambit reconnaissance satellite, from PALC-2-3. Twelve Atlas-Agenas launches were conducted from PALC-2-3, with the last occurring on 12 March 1965.

=== Titan IIIB ===
Following this, it was rebuilt as SLC-4W, a Titan launch complex. The first Titan launch from SLC-4W was a Titan IIIB, on 29 July 1966. All 68 Titan IIIB launches occurred from SLC-4W, with the last on 12 February 1987.

=== Titan 23G ===
After the retirement of the Titan IIIB, it became a Titan 23G launch site, and twelve Titan II launches, using the 23G orbital configuration, were conducted between 5 September 1988 and 18 October 2003. Following the retirement of the Titan 23G, SLC-4W was deactivated. 93 rockets were launched from SLC-4W.

SLC-4W was the site of the launch of Clementine, the only spacecraft to be launched from Vandenberg to the Moon, which was launched by a Titan 23G on 25 January 1994.

== LZ-4 ==
=== Development history ===
SpaceX signed a five-year lease of Launch Complex 4W in February 2015, in order to use the area to land reusable launch vehicles at the pad. The location is being used for vertical landing of Return-To-Launch-Site (RTLS) first-stage boosters of the Falcon 9 rockets that are launched from the adjacent SLC-4E launch pad. This novel use of SLC-4W had initially surfaced in July 2014 when NASASpaceFlight.com published that SpaceX was considering leasing SLC-4W for use as a RTLS vertical-landing facility for reusable first-stage boosters.

Principal structures on the pad were demolished in September 2014 as construction of the landing pad began and was completed sometime around 2017.

=== Detailed landing history ===
After performing return-to-launch-site (RTLS) landings at its two Cape Canaveral Space Force Station landing pads, Landing Zones 1 and 2, the company initially planned to attempt the first West Coast booster landing at Vandenberg AFB with the fourth Iridium NEXT satellite launch in December 2017, but ultimately opted for an expendable mission.

In July 2018, SpaceX filed an FCC permit to communicate with a Falcon 9 first stage post-landing at SLC-4W, hinting at a potential RTLS landing, for the SAOCOM 1A mission. This launch was later rescheduled to October 8, 2018. Publicly announced through FCC permits and sonic boom warnings, SpaceX renamed SLC-4W as Landing Zone 4 ahead of the first landing attempt. The landing of a Falcon 9 first stage booster successfully occurred at Landing Zone 4 in October 2018, following the launch of the Argentinian SAOCOM 1A satellite.

== Launch and landing statistics ==
=== SLC-4E ===
- Atlas-Agena
- Titan IIID
- Titan 34D
- Titan IV
- Falcon 9

==== Atlas-Agena (1964–1967) ====
All flights operated by the United States Air Force.

No.	Date	Time (UTC)	Launch vehicle	Configuration	Payload	Result	Remarks
1	14 August 1964	22:00	Atlas-Agena	Atlas SLV-3 / Agena-D	OPS-3802 (KH-7)	Success	First launch from PALC-2-4.
2	23 September 1964	13:10	Atlas-Agena	Atlas SLV-3 / Agena-D	OPS-4262 (KH-7)	Success	
3	8 October 1964	Unknown	Atlas-Agena	Atlas SLV-3 / Agena-D	OPS-4036 (KH-7)	Failure	Electrical short caused Agena to shut down 1.5 seconds after staging and ignition, leading to range safety protocols being activated.
4	4 December 1964	18:57	Atlas-Agena	Atlas SLV-3 / Agena-D	OPS-4439 (KH-7)	Success	
5	3 April 1965	21:25	Atlas-Agena	Atlas SLV-3 / Agena-D	SNAP-10A	Success	Part of the Systems for Nuclear Auxiliary Power program, designed to study radioisotope thermoelectric generators and nuclear power in space. Only American nuclear reactor to be launched into space so far, and first demonstration of an ion thruster in orbit.
6	28 April 1965	20:17	Atlas-Agena	Atlas SLV-3 / Agena-D	OPS-4983 (KH-7)	Success	
7	27 May 1965	19:30	Atlas-Agena	Atlas SLV-3 / Agena-D	OPS-5236 (KH-7)	Success	
8	25 June 1965	19:30	Atlas-Agena	Atlas SLV-3 / Agena-D	OPS-5501 (KH-7)	Success	
9	12 July 1965	19:00	Atlas-Agena	Atlas SLV-3 / Agena-D	OPS-5810 (KH-7)	Failure	Programmer error caused accidental sustainer engine shutdown alongside booster engine cutoff, causing vehicle to lose thrust and impact the Pacific Ocean.
10	3 August 1965	19:12	Atlas-Agena	Atlas SLV-3 / Agena-D	OPS-5698 (KH-7)	Success	
11	30 September 1965	19:20	Atlas-Agena	Atlas SLV-3 / Agena-D	OPS-7208 (KH-7)	Success	
12	8 November 1965	19:26	Atlas-Agena	Atlas SLV-3 / Agena-D	OPS-6232 (KH-7)	Success	
13	19 January 1966	20:10	Atlas-Agena	Atlas SLV-3 / Agena-D	OPS-7253 (KH-7)	Success	
14	15 February 1966	13:04	Atlas-Agena	Atlas SLV-3 / Agena-D	OPS-1184 (KH-7)	Success	
15	18 March 1966	20:30	Atlas-Agena	Atlas SLV-3 / Agena-D	OPS-0879 (KH-7)	Success	
16	19 April 1966	19:12	Atlas-Agena	Atlas SLV-3 / Agena-D	OPS-0910 (KH-7)	Success	
17	14 May 1966	18:30	Atlas-Agena	Atlas SLV-3 / Agena-D	OPS-1950 (KH-7)	Success	
18	3 June 1966	19:25	Atlas-Agena	Atlas SLV-3 / Agena-D	OPS-1577 (KH-7)	Success	
19	12 July 1966	17:57	Atlas-Agena	Atlas SLV-3 / Agena-D	OPS-1850 (KH-7)	Success	
20	16 August 1966	18:30	Atlas-Agena	Atlas SLV-3 / Agena-D	OPS-1832 (KH-7)	Success	
21	16 September 1966	17:59	Atlas-Agena	Atlas SLV-3 / Agena-D	OPS-1686 (KH-7)	Success	
22	12 October 1966	19:15	Atlas-Agena	Atlas SLV-3 / Agena-D	OPS-2055 (KH-7)	Success	
23	2 November 1966	20:23	Atlas-Agena	Atlas SLV-3 / Agena-D	OPS-2070 (KH-7)	Success	
24	5 December 1966	21:09	Atlas-Agena	Atlas SLV-3 / Agena-D	OPS-1890 (KH-7)	Success	
25	2 February 1967	20:00	Atlas-Agena	Atlas SLV-3 / Agena-D	OPS-4399 (KH-7)	Success	
26	22 May 1967	18:30	Atlas-Agena	Atlas SLV-3 / Agena-D	OPS-4321 (KH-7)	Success	
27	4 June 1967	18:07	Atlas-Agena	Atlas SLV-3 / Agena-D	OPS-4360 (KH-7)	Success	Final Atlas flight from PALC-2, and last flight of the KH-7.

==== Titan III and IV (1971–2005) ====
All flights operated by the United States Air Force.

No.	Date	Time (UTC)	Launch vehicle	S/N and configuration	Payload	Result	Remarks
28	15 June 1971	18:41	Titan IIID	3D-1	OPS-8709 (KH-9)	Success	Maiden flight of the Titan IIID and first launch of the KH-9 Hexagon. First boostered Titan launch from Vandenberg and first launch as SLC-4E.
29	20 January 1972	18:36	Titan IIID	3D-2	OPS-1737 (KH-9)	Success	
30	7 July 1972	17:46	Titan IIID	3D-5	OPS-7293 (KH-9)	Success	
31	10 October 1972	18:03	Titan IIID	3D-3	OPS-8314 (KH-9)	Success	
32	9 March 1973	21:00	Titan IIID	3D-6	OPS-8410 (KH-9)	Success	
33	13 July 1973	20:22	Titan IIID	3D-7	OPS-8261 (KH-9)	Success	
34	10 November 1973	20:12	Titan IIID	3D-8	OPS-6630 (KH-9)	Success	
35	10 April 1974	20:20	Titan IIID	3D-9	OPS-6245 (KH-9)	Success	
36	29 October 1974	19:30	Titan IIID	3D-4	OPS-7122 (KH-9)	Success	
37	8 June 1975	18:30	Titan IIID	3D-10	OPS-6381 (KH-9)	Success	
38	4 December 1975	20:30	Titan IIID	3D-13	OPS-5547 (KH-9)	Success	
39	8 July 1976	18:30	Titan IIID	3D-14	OPS-4699 (KH-9)	Success	
40	19 December 1976	18:19	Titan IIID	3D-15	OPS-5705 (KH-11)	Success	Maiden flight of the KH-11 Kennan, and first Key Hole launch without a capsule return planned.
41	27 June 1977	18:30	Titan IIID	3D-17	OPS-4800 (KH-9)	Success	
42	26 March 1978	18:40	Titan IIID	3D-20	OPS-0460 (KH-9)	Success	
43	14 June 1978	18:23	Titan IIID	3D-18	OPS-4515 (KH-11)	Success	
44	16 March 1979	18:30	Titan IIID	3D-21	OPS-3854 (KH-9)	Success	
45	7 February 1980	21:10	Titan IIID	3D-19	OPS-2581 (KH-11)	Success	
46	18 June 1980	18:30	Titan IIID	3D-16	OPS-3123 (KH-9)	Success	
47	3 September 1981	18:29	Titan IIID	3D-22	OPS-3984 (KH-11)	Success	
48	11 May 1982	18:35	Titan IIID	3D-24	OPS-5642 (KH-9)	Success	
49	17 November 1982	21:18	Titan IIID	3D-23	OPS-9627 (KH-11)	Success	Last flight of the Titan IIID.
50	20 June 1983	18:45	Titan 34D	34D-5	OPS-0721 (KH-9)	Success	First Titan 34D flight from Vandenberg.
51	25 June 1984	18:47	Titan 34D	34D-4	USA-2 (KH-9)	Success	Final successful KH-9 launch.
52	4 December 1984	18:03	Titan 34D	34D-6	USA-6 (KH-11)	Success	
53	28 August 1985	21:20	Titan 34D	34D-7	KH-11	Failure	Propellant leak in core stage caused LR-87 to shut down, leading to loss of control and RSO protocols 272 seconds after launch.
54	18 April 1986	18:45	Titan 34D	34D-9	KH-9	Failure	Final launch of the KH-9 and of a Key Hole satellite using film return capsules. Booster segment joint failure caused SRB to explode 8 seconds after launch, destroying the vehicle and damaging SLC-4E and 4W with showering debris. Failure garnered attention thanks to similarities to the Space Shuttle Challenger disaster, which occurred only three months before.
55	26 October 1987	21:32	Titan 34D	34D-15	USA-27 (KH-11)	Success	
56	6 November 1988	18:03	Titan 34D	34D-14	USA-33 (KH-11)	Success	Final Titan 34D flight from Vandenberg and last west coast Titan III launch.
57	8 March 1991	12:03	Titan IV	K-5, 403A	USA-69 (Lacrosse)	Success	First Titan IV launch from Vandenberg.
58	8 November 1991	07:07	Titan IV	K-8, 403A	USA-72, USA-74, USA-76, and USA-77 (NOSS and SLDCOM)	Success	
59	28 November 1992	21:34	Titan IV	K-3, 404A	USA-86 (KH-11)	Success	
60	2 August 1993	19:59	Titan IV	K-11, 403A	3 NOSS and SLDCOM	Failure	Improperly repaired solid rocket booster led to explosion 101 seconds after launch, destroying the vehicle.
61	5 December 1995	21:18	Titan IV	K-15, 404A	USA-116 (KH-11)	Success	
62	12 May 1996	21:32	Titan IV	K-22, 403A	USA-119 to USA-124 (NOSS, SLDCOM, and TiPS)	Success	
63	20 December 1996	18:04	Titan IV	K-13, 404A	NROL-2	Success	NRO launch. KH-11 satellite, also known as USA-129. First acknowledged launch by the National Reconnaissance Office from Vandenberg.
64	24 October 1997	02:32	Titan IV	A-18, 403A	NROL-3	Success	NRO launch. Lacrosse satellite, also known as USA-133. Last Titan IV-A flight from SLC-4E.
65	22 May 1999	09:36	Titan IV	B-12, 404B	NROL-8	Success	NRO launch. Misty satellite, also known as USA-144. First Titan IV-B launch from SLC-4E.
66	17 August 2000	23:45	Titan IV	B-28, 403B	NROL-11	Success	NRO launch. Lacrosse satellite, also known as USA-152.
67	5 October 2001	21:21	Titan IV	B-34, 404B	NROL-14	Success	NRO launch. KH-11 satellite, also known as USA-161.
68	19 October 2005	18:05	Titan IV	B-26, 404B	NROL-20	Success	NRO launch. KH-11 satellite, also known as USA-186. Final Titan IV launch from SLC-4E, final Titan launch from Vandenberg, and final flight of the Titan family.

==== Falcon 9 (2013–2024) ====
All flights operated by SpaceX.

No.	Date	Time (UTC)	Launch vehicle	Booster flight (Note: Falcon 9 first-stage boosters have a four-digit serial number. A decimal point followed by a number indicates the flight count. For example, B1021.1 and B1021.2 represent the first and second flights of booster B1021. Boosters without a decimal point were expended on their first flight.)	Payload	Result	Remarks
69	29 September 2013	16:00	Falcon 9 v1.1	1003	CASSIOPE	Success	Maiden flight of the Falcon 9 v1.1 and first SpaceX flight from Vandenberg. First civilian launch from SLC-4E. First commercial Falcon 9 flight, using fairings instead of carrying a Dragon capsule.
70	17 January 2016	18:32	Falcon 9 v1.1	1017	Jason-3	Success	Part of the Jason satellite series, aiming to study oceanography. Collaboration between NASA, NOAA, and CNES. Final flight of Falcon 9 v1.1, and first attempt at a west coast first stage landing, using first deployment of drone ship Just Read the Instructions. Landing leg lock failed to latch, causing stage to tip over.
71	14 January 2017	17:54	Falcon 9 Full Thrust	1029-1	Iridium NEXT-1	Success	First Vandenberg launch of Falcon 9 Full Thrust and first launch since the AMOS-6 explosion at SLC-40 in September 2016. First successful west coast booster landing.
72	25 June 2017	20:25	Falcon 9 Full Thrust	1036-1	Iridium NEXT-2	Success	
73	24 August 2017	18:50	Falcon 9 Full Thrust	1038-1	FORMOSAT-5	Success	Originally scheduled to launch on a Falcon 1e from Omelek Island in 2013.
74	9 October 2017	12:37	Falcon 9 Block 4	1041-1	Iridium NEXT-3	Success	First Falcon 9 Block 4 launch from Vandenberg.
75	23 December 2017	01:27	Falcon 9 Full Thrust	1036-2	Iridium NEXT-4	Success	First west coast reflight of a booster. Originally planned to be return-to-launch-site but later cancelled. Booster expended via water landing.
76	22 February 2018	14:17	Falcon 9 Full Thrust	1038-2	Paz and Starlink Tintin A & B	Success	First test launch of Starlink satellites, carrying two "Tintin" probes. First recovery of a Falcon 9 fairing. last west coast Falcon 9 Full Thrust flight. Booster expended via water landing.
77	30 March 2018	14:13	Falcon 9 Block 4	1041-2	Iridium NEXT-5	Success	Booster expended via water landing.
78	22 May 2018	19:47	Falcon 9 Block 4	1043-2	Iridium-NEXT-6 and GRACE-FO	Success	Collaboration between NASA and DLR for GRACE-FO, launched as rideshare and designed to study gravitational anomalies. Last Falcon 9 Block 4 launch from Vandenberg. Booster expended via water landing.
79	25 July 2018	11:39	Falcon 9 Block 5	1048-1	Iridium NEXT-7	Success	First Falcon 9 Block 5 launch from Vandenberg.
80	8 October 2018	02:21	Falcon 9 Block 5	1048-2	SAOCOM 1A	Success	First land landing on SpaceX's at Landing Zone 4 in SLC-4W.
81	3 December 2018	18:34	Falcon 9 Block 5	1046-3	SSO-A	Success	
82	11 January 2019	15:31	Falcon 9 Block 5	1049-2	Iridium NEXT-8	Success	
83	12 June 2019	14:17	Falcon 9 Block 5	1051-2	RADARSAT Constellation	Success	Set of three Earth observation satellites by the Canadian Space Agency.
84	21 November 2020	17:17	Falcon 9 Block 5	1063-1	Sentinel-6 Michael Freilich	Success	Ppart of ESA's Copernicus Programme series of earth observation satellites. First Sentinel launch from the United States.
85	14 September 2021	03:55	Falcon 9 Block 5	1049-10	Starlink Group 2–1	Success	First Starlink launch from Vandenberg,
86	24 November 2021	01:21	Falcon 9 Block 5	1063-3	Double Asteroid Redirection Test	Success	First of two Asteroid Impact and Deflection Assessment missions by NASA and ESA, aimed at demonstrating and studying impacting for asteroid defense at 65803 Didymos. Compliments the 2024 launch of Hera. First artificial object to change a celestial body's orbit. First Falcon 9 launch to another celestial body outside Earth's Hill sphere, and first successful launch from SLC-4 to heliocentric orbit.
87	18 December 2021	12:41	Falcon 9 Block 5	1051-11	Starlink Group 4–4	Success	
88	2 February 2022	20:27	Falcon 9 Block 5	1071-1	NROL-87	Success	NRO launch. Unknown satellite, also known as USA-326.
89	25 February 2022	17:12	Falcon 9 Block 5	1063-4	Starlink Group 4–11	Success	
90	17 April 2022	13:13	Falcon 9 Block 5	1071-2	NROL-85	Success	NRO launch. Two Intruder satellites, sharing the designation USA-327.
91	13 May 2022	22:07	Falcon 9 Block 5	1063-5	Starlink Group 4–13	Success	
92	18 June 2022	14:19	Falcon 9 Block 5	1071-3	SARah 1	Success	
93	11 July 2022	01:39	Falcon 9 Block 5	1063-6	Starlink Group 3–1	Success	
94	22 July 2022	17:39	Falcon 9 Block 5	1071-4	Starlink Group 3–2	Success	
95	12 August 2022	21:40	Falcon 9 Block 5	1061-10	Starlink Group 3–3	Success	
96	31 August 2022	05:40	Falcon 9 Block 5	1063-7	Starlink Group 3–4	Success	
97	5 October 2022	23:10	Falcon 9 Block 5	1071-5	Starlink Group 4–29	Success	
98	28 October 2022	01:14	Falcon 9 Block 5	1063-8	Starlink Group 4–31	Success	
99	16 December 2022	11:46	Falcon 9 Block 5	1071-6	Surface Water and Ocean Topography	Success	Joint mission between NASA and CNES, designed to survey ocean topography.
100	30 December 2022	07:38	Falcon 9 Block 5	1061-11	EROS-C3	Success	
101	19 January 2023	15:43	Falcon 9 Block 5	1075-1	Starlink Group 2–4	Success	
102	31 January 2023	16:15	Falcon 9 Block 5	1071-7	Starlink Group 2–6	Success	Carried the ION SCV-009 cubesat deployer as a secondary payload.
103	17 February 2023	19:12	Falcon 9 Block 5	1063-9	Starlink Group 2–5	Success	
104	3 March 2023	18:38	Falcon 9 Block 5	1061-12	Starlink Group 2–7	Success	
105	17 March 2023	19:26	Falcon 9 Block 5	1071-8	Starlink Group 2–8	Success	
106	2 April 2023	14:29	Falcon 9 Block 5	1075-2	SDA Tranche 0A	Success	
107	15 April 2023	06:48	Falcon 9 Block 5	1063-10	Transporter 7	Success	First SpaceX Transporter mission of satellite ridesharing to launch from Vandenberg.
108	27 April 2023	13:40	Falcon 9 Block 5	1061-13	Starlink Group 3–5	Success	
109	10 May 2023	20:09	Falcon 9 Block 5	1075-3	Starlink Group 2–9	Success	
110	20 May 2023	13:16	Falcon 9 Block 5	1063-11	Iridium NEXT-9 and OneWeb #19	Success	
111	31 May 2023	06:02	Falcon 9 Block 5	1061-14	Starlink Group 2–10	Success	
112	12 June 2023	21:35	Falcon 9 Block 5	1071-9	Transporter 8	Success	
113	22 June 2023	07:19	Falcon 9 Block 5	1075-4	Starlink Group 5–7	Success	
114	7 July 2023	19:29	Falcon 9 Block 5	1063-12	Starlink Group 5–13	Success	
115	20 July 2023	04:09	Falcon 9 Block 5	1071-10	Starlink Group 6–15	Success	
116	8 August 2023	03:57	Falcon 9 Block 5	1075-5	Starlink Group 6–20	Success	
117	22 August 2023	09:37	Falcon 9 Block 5	1061-15	Starlink Group 7–1	Success	
118	2 September 2023	14:25	Falcon 9 Block 5	1063-13	SDA Tranche 0B	Success	
119	12 September 2023	06:57	Falcon 9 Block 5	1071-11	Starlink Group 7–2	Success	
120	25 September 2023	08:48	Falcon 9 Block 5	1075-6	Starlink Group 7–3	Success	
121	9 October 2023	07:23	Falcon 9 Block 5	1063-14	Starlink Group 7–4	Success	
122	21 October 2023	08:23	Falcon 9 Block 5	1061-16	Starlink Group 7–5	Success	
123	29 October 2023	09:00	Falcon 9 Block 5	1075-7	Starlink Group 7–6	Success	
124	11 November 2023	18:49	Falcon 9 Block 5	1071-12	Transporter 9	Success	
125	20 November 2023	10:30	Falcon 9 Block 5	1063-15	Starlink Group 7–7	Success	
126	1 December 2023	18:19	Falcon 9 Block 5	1061-17	425 Project Flight 1	Success	
127	8 December 2023	08:03	Falcon 9 Block 5	1071-13	Starlink Group 7–8	Success	
128	24 December 2023	13:11	Falcon 9 Block 5	1075-8	SARah 2 & 3	Success	
129	3 January 2024	03:44	Falcon 9 Block 5	1082-1	Starlink Group 7–9	Success	
130	14 January 2024	08:59	Falcon 9 Block 5	1061-18	Starlink Group 7–10	Success	
131	24 January 2024	00:35	Falcon 9 Block 5	1063-16	Starlink Group 7–11	Success	
132	29 January 2024	05:57	Falcon 9 Block 5	1075-9	Starlink Group 7–12	Success	
133	10 February 2024	00:34	Falcon 9 Block 5	1071-14	Starlink Group 7–13	Success	
134	15 February 2024	21:34	Falcon 9 Block 5	1082-2	Starlink Group 7–14	Success	
135	23 February 2024	04:11	Falcon 9 Block 5	1061-19	Starlink Group 7–15	Success	
136	4 March 2024	22:05	Falcon 9 Block 5	1081-5	Transporter 10	Success	
137	11 March 2024	04:09	Falcon 9 Block 5	1063-17	Starlink Group 7–17	Success	
138	19 March 2024	02:28	Falcon 9 Block 5	1075-10	Starlink Group 7–16	Success	Carried two Starshield as secondary payloads.
139	2 April 2024	02:30	Falcon 9 Block 5	1071-15	Starlink Group 7–18	Success	
140	7 April 2024	02:25	Falcon 9 Block 5	1081-6	Starlink Group 8–1	Success	
141	11 April 2024	14:25	Falcon 9 Block 5	1082-3	USSF-62	Success	Launch for the United States Space Force. First launch of a Weather System Follow-on Mircrowave satellite, designed to succeed the Defense Meteorological Satellite Program.
142	2 May 2024	18:36	Falcon 9 Block 5	1061-20	WorldView Legion 1 and 2	Success	
143	10 May 2024	04:30	Falcon 9 Block 5	1082-4	Starlink Group 8–2	Success	
144	14 May 2024	18:39	Falcon 9 Block 5	1063-18	Starlink Group 8–7	Success	
145	22 May 2024	08:00	Falcon 9 Block 5	1071-16	NROL-146	Success	NRO launch. 21 Starshield satellites, also known as USA-354 to USA-374.
146	28 May 2024	22:20	Falcon 9 Block 5	1081-7	EarthCARE	Success	Part of the Earth Explorer Programme, designed to study clouds, aerosols, solar radiation and infrared radiation. Collaboration between ESA and JAXA.
147	8 June 2024	12:58	Falcon 9 Block 5	1061-21	Starlink Group 8–8	Success	
148	19 June 2024	03:40	Falcon 9 Block 5	1082-5	Starlink Group 9–1	Success	
149	24 June 2024	03:47	Falcon 9 Block 5	1075-11	Starlink Group 9–2	Success	
150	29 June 2024	03:14	Falcon 9 Block 5	1081-8	NROL-186	Success	NRO launch. 21 Starshield satellites, also known as USA-375 to USA-395.
151	12 July 2024	02:35	Falcon 9 Block 5	1063-19	Starlink Group 9–3	Failure	Oxygen leak in upper stage resulted in engine disintegration during second burn. All 20 satellites deployed, but mishap shortened lifespan to operational uselessness.
152	28 July 2024	09:22	Falcon 9 Block 5	1071-17	Starlink Group 9–4	Success	
153	4 August 2024	07:24	Falcon 9 Block 5	1082-6	Starlink Group 11–1	Success	
154	12 August 2024	02:02	Falcon 9 Block 5	1061-22	ASBM 1 & ASBM 2	Success	
155	16 August 2024	18:56	Falcon 9 Block 5	1075-12	Transporter 11	Success	
156	31 August 2024	08:48	Falcon 9 Block 5	1081-9	Starlink Group 9–5	Success	
157	6 September 2024	03:20	Falcon 9 Block 5	1063-20	NROL-113	Success	NRO launch. 21 Starshield satellites, also known as USA-400 to USA-420.
158	13 September 2024	01:45	Falcon 9 Block 5	1071-18	Starlink Group 9–6	Success	
159	20 September 2024	13:50	Falcon 9 Block 5	1075-13	Starlink Group 9–17	Success	
160	25 September 2024	04:01	Falcon 9 Block 5	1081-10	Starlink Group 9–8	Success	
161	15 October 2024	08:21	Falcon 9 Block 5	1071-19	Starlink Group 9–7	Success	
162	20 October 2024	05:13	Falcon 9 Block 5	1082-7	OneWeb #20	Success	
163	24 October 2024	17:13	Falcon 9 Block 5	1063-21	NROL-167	Success	NRO launch. 17 Starshield satellites, also known as USA-421 to USA-437.
164	30 October 2024	12:07	Falcon 9 Block 5	1075-14	Starlink Group 9–9	Success	
165	9 November 2024	06:14	Falcon 9 Block 5	1081-11	Starlink Group 9–10	Success	
166	14 November 2024	05:23	Falcon 9 Block 5	1082-8	Starlink Group 9–11	Success	
167	18 November 2024	05:53	Falcon 9 Block 5	1071-20	Starlink Group 9–12	Success	
168	24 November 2024	05:25	Falcon 9 Block 5	1075-15	Starlink Group 9–13	Success	
169	30 November 2024	08:10	Falcon 9 Block 5	1088-1	NROL-126	Success	NRO launch. 2 Starshield satellites, also known as USA-438 and USA-439. Launched alongside 20 Starlink satellites.
170	5 December 2024	03:05	Falcon 9 Block 5	1081-12	Starlink Group 9–14	Success	
171	13 December 2024	21:55	Falcon 9 Block 5	1082-9	Starlink Group 11–2	Success	
172	17 December 2024	13:49	Falcon 9 Block 5	1063-22	NROL-149	Success	NRO launch. 22 Starshield satellites, also known as USA-441 to USA-462.
173	21 December 2024	11:34	Falcon 9 Block 5	1071-21	Bandwagon-2	Success	
174	29 December 2024	01:58	Falcon 9 Block 5	1075-16	Starlink Group 11–3	Success	

==== Falcon 9 (since 2025) ====
All flights operated by SpaceX.

No.	Date	Time (UTC)	Launch vehicle	Booster flight	Payload	Result	Remarks
175	10 January 2025	03:53	Falcon 9 Block 5	1071-22	NROL-153	Success	NRO launch. 21 Starshield satellites, also known as USA-463 to USA-483.
176	14 January 2025	19:09	Falcon 9 Block 5	1088-2	Transporter 12	Success	
177	21 January 2025	15:45	Falcon 9 Block 5	1082-10	Starlink Group 11–8	Success	
178	24 January 2025	14:07	Falcon 9 Block 5	1063-23	Starlink Group 11–6	Success	
179	1 February 2025	23:02	Falcon 9 Block 5	1075-17	Starlink Group 11–4	Success	
180	11 February 2025	02:09	Falcon 9 Block 5	1071-23	Starlink Group 11–10	Success	
181	23 February 2025	01:38	Falcon 9 Block 5	1082-11	Starlink Group 15–1	Success	
182	12 March 2025	03:10	Falcon 9 Block 5	1088-3	SPHEREx & PUNCH	Success	Part of the Explorer program. SPHEREx designed to create a survey of infrared galaxy spectra, PUNCH designed to study the outer solar corona.
183	15 March 2025	06:43	Falcon 9 Block 5	1081-13	Transporter 13	Success	
184	21 March 2025	06:49	Falcon 9 Block 5	1088-4	NROL-57	Success	NRO launch. 11 Starshield satellites, also known as USA-487 to USA-497.
185	26 March 2025	22:11	Falcon 9 Block 5	1063-24	Starlink Group 11–7	Success	
186	4 April 2025	01:02	Falcon 9 Block 5	1088-5	Starlink Group 11–13	Success	
187	7 April 2025	23:06	Falcon 9 Block 5	1093-1	Starlink Group 11–11	Success	
188	12 April 2025	12:25	Falcon 9 Block 5	1071-24	NROL-192	Success	NRO launch. 22 Starshield satellites, also known as USA-499 to USA-520.
189	20 April 2025	12:29	Falcon 9 Block 5	1082-12	NROL-145	Success	NRO launch. 22 Starshield satellites, also known as USA-523 to USA-544. First NRO launch under NSSL Phase 3 Lane 1.
190	28 April 2025	20:42	Falcon 9 Block 5	1063-25	Starlink Group 11–9	Success	
191	10 May 2025	00:19	Falcon 9 Block 5	1081-14	Starlink Group 15–3	Success	
192	13 May 2025	01:15	Falcon 9 Block 5	1088-6	Starlink Group 15–4	Success	
193	16 May 2025	13:43	Falcon 9 Block 5	1093-2	Starlink Group 15–5	Success	
194	23 May 2025	22:32	Falcon 9 Block 5	1075-18	Starlink Group 11–16	Success	
195	27 May 2025	16:57	Falcon 9 Block 5	1082-13	Starlink Group 17–1	Success	
196	31 May 2025	20:10	Falcon 9 Block 5	1071-25	Starlink Group 11–18	Success	
197	4 June 2025	23:40	Falcon 9 Block 5	1063-26	Starlink Group 11–22	Success	
198	8 June 2025	14:20	Falcon 9 Block 5	1088-7	Starlink Group 15–8	Success	
199	13 June 2025	01:54	Falcon 9 Block 5	1081-15	Starlink Group 15–6	Success	
200	17 June 2025	03:36	Falcon 9 Block 5	1093-3	Starlink Group 15–9	Success	
201	23 June 2025	21:25	Falcon 9 Block 5	1071-26	Transporter 14	Success	
202	28 June 2025	17:13	Falcon 9 Block 5	1088-8	Starlink Group 15–7	Success	
203	16 July 2025	02:05	Falcon 9 Block 5	1093-4	Starlink Group 15–2	Success	
204	19 July 2025	03:52	Falcon 9 Block 5	1082-14	Starlink Group 17–3	Success	
205	23 July 2025	18:13	Falcon 9 Block 5	1081-16	TRACERS + 5 rideshares	Success	Part of the Explorer program, designed to observe the solar wind and how it forms.
206	27 July 2025	04:31	Falcon 9 Block 5	1075-19	Starlink Group 17–2	Success	
207	31 July 2025	18:35	Falcon 9 Block 5	1071-27	Starlink Group 13–4	Success	
208	14 August 2025	05:05	Falcon 9 Block 5	1093-5	Starlink Group 17–4	Success	
209	18 August 2025	16:26	Falcon 9 Block 5	1088-9	Starlink Group 17–5	Success	
210	22 August 2025	17:04	Falcon 9 Block 5	1081-17	Starlink Group 17–6	Success	
211	26 August 2025	18:53	Falcon 9 Block 5	1063-27	NAOS (LUXEOSys) + 7 rideshares	Success	
212	30 August 2025	04:59	Falcon 9 Block 5	1082-15	Starlink Group 17–7	Success	
213	3 September 2025	03:51	Falcon 9 Block 5	1097-1	Starlink Group 17–8	Success	
214	6 September 2025	18:06	Falcon 9 Block 5	1075-20	Starlink Group 17–9	Success	
215	10 September 2025	14:12	Falcon 9 Block 5	1093-6	SDA Tranche 1 Transport Layer B	Success	
216	13 September 2025	17:55	Falcon 9 Block 5	1071-28	Starlink Group 17–10	Success	
217	19 September 2025	16:31	Falcon 9 Block 5	1088-10	Starlink Group 17–12	Success	
218	22 September 2025	17:38	Falcon 9 Block 5	1081-18	NROL-48	Success	NRO launch. 11 Starshield satellites, also known as USA-558 to USA-565.
219	26 September 2025	04:26	Falcon 9 Block 5	1082-16	Starlink Group 17–11	Success	
220	29 September 2025	02:04	Falcon 9 Block 5	1063-28	Starlink Group 11–20	Success	
221	3 October 2025	14:06	Falcon 9 Block 5	1097-2	Starlink Group 11–39	Success	47 Launches were carried out in this complex this year, surpassing last year with 46 launches carried out.
222	8 October 2025	03:54	Falcon 9 Block 5	1071-29	Starlink Group 11–17	Success	
223	15 October 2025	23:06	Falcon 9 Block 5	1093-7	SDA Tranche 1 Transport Layer C	Success	
224	19 October 2025	19:24	Falcon 9 Block 5	1088-11	Starlink Group 11–19	Success	
225	22 October 2025	14:16	Falcon 9 Block 5	1075-21	Starlink Group 11–5	Success	
226	25 October 2025	14:20	Falcon 9 Block 5	1081-19	Starlink Group 11–12	Success	
227	28 October 2025	00:43	Falcon 9 Block 5	1082-17	Starlink Group 11–21	Success	
228	31 October 2025	20:41	Falcon 9 Block 5	1063-29	Starlink Group 11–23	Success	
229	6 November 2025	21:13	Falcon 9 Block 5	1093-8	Starlink Group 11–14	Success	
230	17 November 2025	05:21	Falcon 9 Block 5	1097-3	Sentinel-6B	Success	Part of ESA's Copernicus Programme series of earth observation satellites.
231	23 November 2025	08:48	Falcon 9 Block 5	1100-1	Starlink Group 11–30	Success	
232	28 November 2025	18:44	Falcon 9 Block 5	1071-30	Transporter-15	Success	
233	2 December 2025	05:28	Falcon 9 Block 5	1081-20	Starlink Group 15–10	Success	
234	4 December 2025	20:42	Falcon 9 Block 5	1097-4	Starlink Group 11–25	Success	
235	7 December 2025	17:58	Falcon 9 Block 5	1088-12	Starlink Group 11–15	Success	
236	10 December 2025	11:40	Falcon 9 Block 5	1082-18	Starlink Group 15–11	Success	
237	14 December 2025	05:49	Falcon 9 Block 5	1093-9	Starlink Group 15–12	Success	
238	17 December 2025	15:27	Falcon 9 Block 5	1063-30	Starlink Group 15–13	Success	
239	3 January 2026	02:09	Falcon 9 Block 5	1081-21	CSG-3	Success	
240	11 January 2026	13:44	Falcon 9 Block 5	1097-5	Twilight Rideshare	Success	Rideshare mission. Includes Pandora as payload, first launch of the Pioneers Program, designed to study exoplanet atmospheres from the transit method.
241	17 January 2026	04:39	Falcon 9 Block 5	1100-2	NROL-105	Success	NRO launch. 9 Starshield satellites, also known as USA-572 to USA-580.
242	22 January 2026	05:47	Falcon 9 Block 5	1093-10	Starlink Group 17–30	Success	
243	25 January 2026	17:30	Falcon 9 Block 5	1097-6	Starlink Group 17–20	Success	
244	29 January 2026	17:53	Falcon 9 Block 5	1082-19	Starlink Group 17–19	Success	
245	2 February 2026	15:47	Falcon 9 Block 5	1071-31	Starlink Group 17–32	Success	
246	7 February 2026	20:58	Falcon 9 Block 5	1088-13	Starlink Group 17–33	Success	
247	11 February 2026	17:11	Falcon 9 Block 5	1100-3	Starlink Group 17–34	Success	
248	15 February 2026	01:59	Falcon 9 Block 5	1081-22	Starlink Group 17–13	Success	
249	21 February 2026	09:04	Falcon 9 Block 5	1063-31	Starlink Group 17–25	Success	
250	25 February 2026	14:17	Falcon 9 Block 5	1093-11	Starlink Group 17–26	Success	
251	1 March 2026	10:10	Falcon 9 Block 5	1082-20	Starlink Group 17–23	Success	
252	8 March 2026	11:00	Falcon 9 Block 5	1097-7	Starlink Group 17–18	Success	
253	13 March 2026	14:57	Falcon 9 Block 5	1071-32	Starlink Group 17–31	Success	
254	17 March 2026	05:19	Falcon 9 Block 5	1088-14	Starlink Group 17–24	Success	
255	20 March 2026	21:51	Falcon 9 Block 5	1100-4	Starlink Group 17–15	Success	
256	26 March 2026	23:03	Falcon 9 Block 5	1081-23	Starlink Group 17–17	Success	
257	30 March 2026	11:02	Falcon 9 Block 5	1093-12	Transporter-16	Success	
258	7 April 2026	02:50	Falcon 9 Block 5	1103-1	Starlink Group 17–35	Success	
259	11 April 2026	05:04	Falcon 9 Block 5	1063-32	Starlink Group 17–21	Success	
260	15 April 2026	04:29	Falcon 9 Block 5	1082-21	Starlink Group 17–27	Success	
261	19 April 2026	16:03	Falcon 9 Block 5	1097-8	Starlink Group 17–22	Success	
262	23 April 2026	03:23	Falcon 9 Block 5	1100-5	Starlink Group 17–14	Success	
263	26 April 2026	14:37	Falcon 9 Block 5	1088-15	Starlink Group 17–16	Success	
264	30 April 2026	02:42	Falcon 9 Block 5	1093-13	Starlink Group 17–36	Success	
265	3 May 2026	07:00	Falcon 9 Block 5	1071-33	CAS500-2 & 45 Rideshares	Success	South Korean Earth-observation satellite.
266	6 May 2026	03:59	Falcon 9 Block 5	1081-24	Starlink Group 17–29	Success	
267	12 May 2026	02:13	Falcon 9 Block 5	1097-9	NROL-172	Success	NRO launch. 22 Starshield satellites, also known as USA-586 to USA-607.
268	20 May 2026	02:46	Falcon 9 Block 5	1103-2	Starlink Group 17–42	Success	
269	26 May 2026	14:50	Falcon 9 Block 5	1100-6	Starlink Group 17–37	Success	
270	30 May 2026	15:25	Falcon 9 Block 5	1082-22	Starlink Group 17–41	Success	
271	3 June 2026	15:40	Falcon 9 Block 5	1088-16	Starlink Group 17–47	Success	
272	7 June 2026	04:24	Falcon 9 Block 5	1097-10	Starlink Group 17–43	Success	
273	11 June 2026	15:05	Falcon 9 Block 5	1071-34	Starlink Group 17–44	Success	
274	15 June 2026	15:34	Falcon 9 Block 5	1093-14	Starlink Group 17–54	Success	First Falcon 9 launch under SpaceX as a publicly traded company, following their initial public offering on June 12.
275	19 June 2026	08:50	Falcon 9 Block 5	1103-3	NROL-179	Success	NRO launch. 9 Starshield satellites, also known as USA-610 to USA-618.
276	21 June 2026	16:39	Falcon 9 Block 5	1063-33	Starlink Group 17–28	Success	
277	25 June 2026	03:30	Falcon 9 Block 5	1081-25	Starlink Group 17–45	Success	
278	28 June 2026	16:09	Falcon 9 Block 5	1088-17	Starlink Group 17–40	Success	
279	2 July 2026	02:58	Falcon 9 Block 5	1100-7	Starlink Group 17–46	Success	
280	7 July 2026	07:12	Falcon 9 Block 5	1097-11	Transporter-17	Success	
281	11 July 2026	03:01	Falcon 9 Block 5	1071-35	Starlink Group 17–48	Success	
282	14 July 2026	01:28	Falcon 9 Block 5	1093-15	Starlink Group 15–14	Success	
283	16 July 2026	20:32	Falcon 9 Block 5	1103-4	SDA Tranche 1 Transport Layer E	Success	
284	21 July 2026	14:49	Falcon 9 Block 5	1082-23	Starlink Group 17–39	Success	
285	25 July 2026	15:51	Falcon 9 Block 5	1100-8	Starlink Group 17–51	Success	
286	1 August 2026	03:08	Falcon 9 Block 5	1081-26	Starlink Group 17–52	Success	
287	4 August 2026	17:05	Falcon 9 Block 5	1063-34	Starlink Group 17–53	Success	
288	8 August 2026	16:35	Falcon 9 Block 5	1093-16	Starlink Group 17–38	Success	
289	12 August 2026	04:46	Falcon 9 Block 5	1103-5	Starlink Group 17–49	Success	
290	16 August 2026	01:50	Falcon 9 Block 5	1088-18	USSF-366	Success	Launch for the United States Space Force. Batch of 9 Starshield-derived satellites, also known as USA-610 to USA-618.
291	19 August 2026	04:01	Falcon 9 Block 5	1097-12	Starlink Group 17–50	Success	
292	22 August 2026	07:25	Falcon 9 Block 5	1100-9	Starlink Group 15–20	Success	
293	26 August 2026	09:35	Falcon 9 Block 5	1082-24	Starlink Group 15–22	Success	
294	2 September 2026	08:42	Falcon 9 Block 5	1063-35	Starlink Group 15–23	Success	
295	6 September 2026	14:26	Falcon 9 Block 5	1088-19	Starlink Group 15–24	Success	
296	10 September 2026	15:42	Falcon 9 Block 5	1081-27	USSF-153	Success	Launch for the United States Space Force. Batch of 23 Starshield-derived satellites, also known as USA-644 to USA-666.
297	17 September 2026	01:07	Falcon 9 Block 5	1097-13	USSF-259	Success	Launch for the United States Space Force. Batch of 17 Starshield-derived satellites, also known as USA-668 to USA-684.
298	20 September 2026	01:47	Falcon 9 Block 5	1093-17	Starlink Group 15–27	Success	
299	26 September 2026	14:00	Falcon 9 Block 5	1100-10	USSF-385	Success	Launch for the United States Space Force. Batch of 23 Starshield-derived satellites, also known as USA-685 to USA-707.
300	1 October 2026	18:32	Falcon 9 Block 5	1082-25	Transporter-18	Success	
301	10 October 2026	07:39	Falcon 9 Block 5	1103-6	SDA Tranche 1 Transport Layer A	Success	
302	13 October 2026	00:28	Falcon 9 Block 5	1088-20	Starlink Group 15–25	Success	
303	16 October 2026	00:01	Falcon 9 Block 5	1081-28	USSF-481	Success	Launch for the United States Space Force. Batch of 17 Starshield-derived satellites, also known as USA-709 to USA-725.
304	23 October 2026	22:48	Falcon 9 Block 5	1063-36	Starlink Group 15–15	Success	
305	27 October 2026	07:25	Falcon 9 Block 5	1082-26	Starlink Group 15–16	Success	
306	31 October 2026	04:04	Falcon 9 Block 5	1093-18	Starlink Group 15–18	Success	
307	7 November 2026	00:48	Falcon 9 Block 5	1095-8	USSF-432	Success	Launch for the United States Space Force. Batch of 23 Starshield-derived satellites, also known as USA-726 to USA-748.
308	12 November 2026	04:36	Falcon 9 Block 5	1103-7	USSF-627	Success	Launch for the United States Space Force. Batch of 23 Starshield-derived satellites, also known as USA-749 to USA-771.
309	21 November 2026	04:20	Falcon 9 Block 5	1100-11	USSF-317	Success	Launch for the United States Space Force.
310	22 November 2026	12:23	Falcon 9 Block 5	1097-14	NROL-136	Success	NRO launch. Rapid turnaround on the pad, 32 hours after the USSF mission.

==== Upcoming launches ====
Planned date	Launch vehicle	Payload
24 November 2026	Falcon 9 Block 5	USSF-266
29 November 2026	Falcon 9 Block 5	USSF-380
November 2026	Falcon 9 Block 5	Starlink Group 15–21
November 2026	Falcon 9 Block 5	NROL-195

=== SLC-4W and LZ-4 ===
==== SLC-4W ====
- Atlas-Agena
- Titan IIIB
- Titan 23G

==== LZ-4 ====
- Falcon 9 Success
- Falcon 9 Failure

==== Atlas and Titan launches ====
All flights prior to November 1963 operated by the United States Navy. All flights afterwards operated by the United States Air Force.

No.	Date	Time (UTC)	Launch vehicle	Configuration	Payload	Result	Remarks
1	12 July 1963	20:46	Atlas-Agena	Atlas LV-3 / Agena-D	OPS-1467 (KH-7)	Success	First launch from PALC-2, and first flight of the KH-7 Gambit.
2	6 September 1963	19:30	Atlas-Agena	Atlas LV-3 / Agena-D	OPS-1947 (KH-7)	Success	
3	25 October 1963	18:59	Atlas-Agena	Atlas LV-3 / Agena-D	OPS-2196 (KH-7)	Success	
4	18 December 1963	21:45	Atlas-Agena	Atlas LV-3 / Agena-D	OPS-2372 (KH-7)	Success	
5	25 February 1964	18:59	Atlas-Agena	Atlas LV-3 / Agena-D	OPS-2423 (KH-7)	Success	
6	11 March 1964	20:14	Atlas-Agena	Atlas LV-3 / Agena-D	OPS-3435 (KH-7)	Success	
7	23 April 1964	16:19	Atlas-Agena	Atlas LV-3 / Agena-D	OPS-3473 (KH-7)	Success	
8	19 May 1964	19:21	Atlas-Agena	Atlas LV-3 / Agena-D	OPS-3592 (KH-7)	Success	
9	6 July 1964	18:51	Atlas-Agena	Atlas LV-3 / Agena-D	OPS-3684 (KH-7)	Success	
10	23 October 1964	18:30	Atlas-Agena	Atlas LV-3 / Agena-D	OPS-4384 (KH-7)	Success	
11	23 January 1965	20:09	Atlas-Agena	Atlas SLV-3 / Agena-D	OPS-4703 (KH-7)	Success	
12	12 March 1965	19:25	Atlas-Agena	Atlas SLV-3 / Agena-D	OPS-4920 (KH-7)	Success	Final Atlas launch from PALC-2-3.
13	29 July 1966	18:43	Titan IIIB	Titan IIIB / Agena-D	OPS-3014 (KH-8)	Success	Maiden flight of the Titan IIIB and first orbital Titan flight from Vandenberg. First launch as SLC-4W and maiden flight of the KH-8 Gambit-3.
14	28 September 1966	19:12	Titan IIIB	Titan IIIB / Agena-D	OPS-4096 (KH-8)	Success	
15	14 December 1966	18:14	Titan IIIB	Titan IIIB / Agena-D	OPS-8968 (KH-8)	Success	
16	24 February 1967	19:55	Titan IIIB	Titan IIIB / Agena-D	OPS-4204 (KH-8)	Success	
17	26 April 1967	18:00	Titan IIIB	Titan IIIB / Agena-D	OPS-4243 (KH-8)	Failure	Probable fuel line obstruction led to loss of thrust in second stage, causing failure to reach orbit and impacting the Pacific Ocean 600 miles downrange.
18	20 June 1967	16:19	Titan IIIB	Titan IIIB / Agena-D	OPS-4282 (KH-8)	Success	
19	16 August 1967	17:02	Titan IIIB	Titan IIIB / Agena-D	OPS-4886 (KH-8)	Success	
20	19 September 1967	18:28	Titan IIIB	Titan IIIB / Agena-D	OPS-4941 (KH-8)	Success	
21	25 October 1967	19:15	Titan IIIB	Titan IIIB / Agena-D	OPS-4995 (KH-8)	Success	
22	5 December 1967	18:45	Titan IIIB	Titan IIIB / Agena-D	OPS-5000 (KH-8)	Success	
23	18 January 1968	19:04	Titan IIIB	Titan IIIB / Agena-D	OPS-5028 (KH-8)	Success	
24	13 March 1968	19:55	Titan IIIB	Titan IIIB / Agena-D	OPS-5057 (KH-8)	Success	
25	7 April 1968	17:00	Titan IIIB	Titan IIIB / Agena-D	OPS-5105 (KH-8)	Success	
26	5 June 1968	17:31	Titan IIIB	Titan IIIB / Agena-D	OPS-5138 (KH-8)	Success	
27	6 August 1968	16:33	Titan IIIB	Titan IIIB / Agena-D	OPS-5187 (KH-8)	Success	
28	10 September 1968	18:30	Titan IIIB	Titan IIIB / Agena-D	OPS-5247 (KH-8)	Success	
29	6 November 1968	19:10	Titan IIIB	Titan IIIB / Agena-D	OPS-5296 (KH-8)	Success	
30	4 December 1968	19:23	Titan IIIB	Titan IIIB / Agena-D	OPS-6518 (KH-8)	Success	
31	22 January 1969	19:10	Titan IIIB	Titan IIIB / Agena-D	OPS-7585 (KH-8)	Success	
32	4 March 1969	19:30	Titan IIIB	Titan IIIB / Agena-D	OPS-4248 (KH-8)	Success	
33	15 April 1969	17:30	Titan IIIB	Titan IIIB / Agena-D	OPS-5310 (KH-8)	Success	
34	3 June 1969	16:49	Titan IIIB	Titan IIIB / Agena-D	OPS-1077 (KH-8)	Success	
35	23 August 1969	16:00	Titan IIIB	Titan III(23)B / Agena-D	OPS-7807 (KH-8A)	Success	
36	14 October 1969	18:10	Titan IIIB	Titan III(23)B / Agena-D	OPS-8455 (KH-8A)	Success	
37	14 January 1970	18:43	Titan IIIB	Titan III(23)B / Agena-D	OPS-6531 (KH-8A)	Success	
38	15 April 1970	15:52	Titan IIIB	Titan III(23)B / Agena-D	OPS-2863 (KH-8A)	Success	
39	25 June 1970	14:50	Titan IIIB	Titan III(23)B / Agena-D	OPS-6820 (KH-8A)	Success	
40	18 August 1970	14:45	Titan IIIB	Titan III(23)B / Agena-D	OPS-7874 (KH-8A)	Success	
41	23 October 1970	17:40	Titan IIIB	Titan III(23)B / Agena-D	OPS-7568 (KH-8A)	Success	
42	21 January 1971	18:28	Titan IIIB	Titan III(23)B / Agena-D	OPS-7776 (KH-8A)	Success	
43	21 March 1971	03:45	Titan IIIB	Titan III(33)B / Agena-D	OPS-4788 (Jumpseat)	Success	
44	22 April 1971	15:30	Titan IIIB	Titan III(23)B / Agena-D	OPS-7899 (KH-8A)	Success	
45	12 August 1971	15:30	Titan IIIB	Titan III(24)B / Agena-D	OPS-8607 (KH-8A)	Success	
46	23 October 1971	17:16	Titan IIIB	Titan III(24)B / Agena-D	OPS-7616 (KH-8A)	Success	
47	16 February 1972	09:59	Titan IIIB	Titan III(33)B / Agena-D	OPS-1844 (Jumpseat)	Failure	Unknown failure caused vehicle to fail to reach orbit.
48	17 March 1972	17:00	Titan IIIB	Titan III(24)B / Agena-D	OPS-1678 (KH-8A)	Success	
49	20 May 1972	15:30	Titan IIIB	Titan III(24)B / Agena-D	OPS-6574 (KH-8A)	Failure	Agena suffered from pressurization failure, causing failure to reach orbit.
50	1 September 1972	17:44	Titan IIIB	Titan III(24)B / Agena-D	OPS-8888 (KH-8A)	Success	
51	21 December 1972	17:45	Titan IIIB	Titan III(24)B / Agena-D	OPS-3978 (KH-8A)	Success	
52	16 May 1973	16:40	Titan IIIB	Titan III(24)B / Agena-D	OPS-2093 (KH-8A)	Success	Payload notable for being used to assess damage to Skylab during ascent prior to Skylab 2's docking.
53	26 June 1973	17:00	Titan IIIB	Titan III(24)B / Agena-D	OPS-4018 (KH-8A)	Failure	First stage fuel take suffered rupture 11 seconds after launch, causing vehicle to break up.
54	21 August 1973	16:07	Titan IIIB	Titan III(33)B / Agena-D	OPS-7724 (Jumpseat)	Success	
55	27 September 1973	17:15	Titan IIIB	Titan III(24)B / Agena-D	OPS-6275 (KH-8A)	Success	
56	13 February 1974	18:00	Titan IIIB	Titan III(24)B / Agena-D	OPS-6889 (KH-8A)	Success	
57	6 June 1974	16:30	Titan IIIB	Titan III(24)B / Agena-D	OPS-1776 (KH-8A)	Success	
58	14 August 1974	15:35	Titan IIIB	Titan III(24)B / Agena-D	OPS-3004 (KH-8A)	Success	
59	10 March 1975	04:41	Titan IIIB	Titan III(34)B / Agena-D	OPS-2439 (Jumpseat)	Success	
60	18 April 1975	16:48	Titan IIIB	Titan III(24)B / Agena-D	OPS-4883 (KH-8A)	Success	
61	9 October 1975	19:15	Titan IIIB	Titan III(24)B / Agena-D	OPS-5499 (KH-8A)	Success	
62	22 March 1976	18:14	Titan IIIB	Titan III(24)B / Agena-D	OPS-7600 (KH-8A)	Success	
63	2 June 1976	20:56	Titan IIIB	Titan III(34)B / Agena-D	OPS-7837 (SDS)	Success	
64	6 August 1976	22:21	Titan IIIB	Titan III(34)B / Agena-D	OPS-7940 (SDS)	Success	
65	15 September 1976	18:50	Titan IIIB	Titan III(24)B / Agena-D	OPS-8533 (KH-8A)	Success	
66	13 March 1977	18:41	Titan IIIB	Titan III(24)B / Agena-D	OPS-4915 (KH-8A)	Success	
67	23 September 1977	18:34	Titan IIIB	Titan III(24)B / Agena-D	OPS-7471 (KH-8A)	Success	
68	25 February 1978	05:00	Titan IIIB	Titan III(34)B / Agena-D	OPS-6031 (Jumpseat)	Success	
69	5 August 1978	05:00	Titan IIIB	Titan III(34)B / Agena-D	OPS-7310 (SDS)	Success	
70	28 May 1979	18:14	Titan IIIB	Titan III(24)B / Agena-D	OPS-7164 (KH-8A)	Success	
71	13 December 1980	16:04	Titan IIIB	Titan III(34)B / Agena-D	OPS-5805 (SDS)	Success	
72	28 February 1981	19:15	Titan IIIB	Titan III(24)B / Agena-D	OPS-1166 (KH-8A)	Success	
73	24 April 1981	21:32	Titan IIIB	Titan III(34)B / Agena-D	OPS-7225 (Jumpseat)	Partial failure	Spacecraft failed to separate from Agena, hampering operations.
74	21 January 1982	19:36	Titan IIIB	Titan III(24)B / Agena-D	OPS-2849 (KH-8A HB)	Success	
75	15 April 1983	18:45	Titan IIIB	Titan III(24)B / Agena-D	OPS-2925 (KH-8A)	Success	
76	31 July 1983	15:41	Titan IIIB	Titan III(34)B / Agena-D	OPS-7304 (Jumpseat)	Success	
77	17 April 1984	18:45	Titan IIIB	Titan III(24)B / Agena-D	OPS-8424 (KH-8A)	Success	Final flight of the KH-8.
78	28 August 1984	18:03	Titan IIIB	Titan III(34)B / Agena-D	USA-4 (SDS)	Success	
79	8 February 1985	06:10	Titan IIIB	Titan III(34)B / Agena-D	USA-9 (SDS)	Success	
80	12 February 1987	06:40	Titan IIIB	Titan III(34)B / Agena-D	USA-21 (SDS)	Success	Final flight of the Titan IIIB, and final flight of an Agena upper stage.
81	5 September 1988	09:25	Titan 23G	Titan II(23)G	USA-32 (Singleton)	Success	Maiden flight of the Titan 23G.
82	6 September 1989	01:49	Titan 23G	Titan II(23)G	USA-45 (Singleton)	Success	
83	25 April 1992	08:53	Titan 23G	Titan II(23)G	USA-81 (Singleton)	Success	
84	5 October 1993	17:56	Titan 23G	Titan II(23)G / Star-37XFP	Landsat 6	Failure	Part of the Landsat program, aimed at providing research-oriented photographs of Earth. First civilian launch from SLC-4W. Star-37 failed to ignite, causing failure to put payload in orbit.
85	25 January 1994	16:34	Titan 23G	Titan II(23)G	Clementine	Success	Collaboration between NASA and the BMDO. Designed to perform long-term tests of instruments as well as exploring the Moon and asteroid 1620 Geographos. First launch to another celestial body from Vandenberg and first dedicated American mission to the Moon since the Apollo Program. (Note: The most recent overall American mission to the Moon prior to Clementine was Explorer 49 in 1973, which was instead focused on radio astronomy. It was placed in selenocentric orbit in order to limit interference from Earth.) Payload failed prior to mission to Geographos.
86	4 April 1997	16:47	Titan 23G	Titan II(23)G / Star-37S	USA-131 (DMSP)	Success	
87	13 May 1998	15:52	Titan 23G	Titan II(23)G / Star-37XFP	NOAA-15	Success	Part of the Advanced TIROS-N series of weather satellites for NOAA. Launched as NOAA-K. First TIROS launch on a Titan.
88	20 June 1999	02:15	Titan 23G	Titan II(23)G	QuickSCAT	Success	Earth observation satellite designed to observe wind speed and direction over oceans.
89	22 December 1999	17:38	Titan 23G	Titan II(23)G / Star-37XFP	USA-147 (DMSP)	Success	
90	21 September 2000	10:22	Titan 23G	Titan II(23)G / Star-37XFP	NOAA-16	Success	Part of the Advanced TIROS-N series of weather satellites for NOAA. Launched as NOAA-L.
91	24 June 2002	18:23	Titan 23G	Titan II(23)G / Star-37XFP	NOAA-17	Success	Part of the Advanced TIROS-N series of weather satellites for NOAA. Launched as NOAA-M. Final civilian launch from SLC-4W prior to LZ-4 conversion.
92	6 January 2003	14:19	Titan 23G	Titan II(23)G	Coriolis	Success	Collaboration between the NRL and AFRL. Earth observation satellite designed to observe wind speed and direction over oceans, as well as observing solar wind.
93	18 October 2003	16:17	Titan 23G	Titan II(23)G / Star-37XFP	USA-172 (DMSP)	Success	Final flight of the Titan 23G. Final Titan II launch and last Titan flight without solid rocket boosters. Final launch from SLC-4W prior to conversion to LZ-4.

==== Falcon 9 landings ====
All landings operated by SpaceX.

No.	Date (UTC)	Launch vehicle	Booster flight	Launch site	Payload	Result
1	8 October 2018	Falcon 9 Block 5	1048-2	SLC-4E	SAOCOM 1A	Success
2	12 June 2019	Falcon 9 Block 5	1051-2	SLC-4E	RADARSAT Constellation	Success
3	21 November 2020	Falcon 9 Block 5	1063-1	SLC-4E	Sentinel-6 Michael Freilich	Success
4	2 February 2022	Falcon 9 Block 5	1071-1	SLC-4E	NROL-87	Success
5	17 April 2022	Falcon 9 Block 5	1071-2	SLC-4E	NROL-85	Success
6	18 June 2022	Falcon 9 Block 5	1071-3	SLC-4E	SARah 1	Success
7	16 December 2022	Falcon 9 Block 5	1071-6	SLC-4E	SWOT	Success
8	30 December 2022	Falcon 9 Block 5	1063-11	SLC-4E	EROS-C3	Success
9	2 April 2023	Falcon 9 Block 5	1075-2	SLC-4E	SDA Tranche 0A	Success
10	15 April 2023	Falcon 9 Block 5	1063-10	SLC-4E	Transporter 7	Success
11	12 June 2023	Falcon 9 Block 5	1071-9	SLC-4E	Transporter 8	Success
12	2 September 2023	Falcon 9 Block 5	1063-13	SLC-4E	SDA Tranche 0B	Success
13	11 November 2023	Falcon 9 Block 5	1071-12	SLC-4E	Transporter 9	Success
14	1 December 2023	Falcon 9 Block 5	1061-17	SLC-4E	425 Project Flight 1	Success
15	24 December 2023	Falcon 9 Block 5	1075-8	SLC-4E	SARah 2 & 3	Success
16	4 March 2024	Falcon 9 Block 5	1081-5	SLC-4E	Transporter 10	Success
17	11 April 2024	Falcon 9 Block 5	1082-3	SLC-4E	USSF-62	Success
18	2 May 2024	Falcon 9 Block 5	1061-20	SLC-4E	WorldView Legion 1 & 2	Success
19	28 May 2024	Falcon 9 Block 5	1081-7	SLC-4E	EarthCARE	Success
20	16 August 2024	Falcon 9 Block 5	1075-12	SLC-4E	Transporter 11	Success
21	20 October 2024	Falcon 9 Block 5	1082-7	SLC-4E	OneWeb #20	Success
22	21 December 2024	Falcon 9 Block 5	1071-21	SLC-4E	Bandwagon-2	Success
23	14 January 2025	Falcon 9 Block 5	1088-2	SLC-4E	Transporter 12	Success
24	12 March 2025	Falcon 9 Block 5	1088-3	SLC-4E	SPHEREx & PUNCH	Success
25	15 March 2025	Falcon 9 Block 5	1081-13	SLC-4E	Transporter 13	Success
26	21 March 2025	Falcon 9 Block 5	1088-4	SLC-4E	NROL-57	Success
27	23 July 2025	Falcon 9 Block 5	1081-16	SLC-4E	TRACERS + 5 rideshares	Success
28	26 August 2025	Falcon 9 Block 5	1063-27	SLC-4E	NAOS (LUXEOSys) + 7 rideshares	Success
29	22 September 2025	Falcon 9 Block 5	1081-18	SLC-4E	NROL-48	Success
30	17 November 2025	Falcon 9 Block 5	1097-3	SLC-4E	Sentinel-6B	Success
31	3 January 2026	Falcon 9 Block 5	1081-21	SLC-4E	CSG-3	Success
32	11 January 2026	Falcon 9 Block 5	1097-5	SLC-4E	Twilight Rideshare	Success
33	17 January 2026	Falcon 9 Block 5	1100-2	SLC-4E	NROL-105	Success
34	3 May 2026	Falcon 9 Block 5	1071-33	SLC-4E	CAS500-2 & 45 Rideshares	Success
35	19 June 2026	Falcon 9 Block 5	1103-3	SLC-4E	NROL-179	Success
36	1 October 2026	Falcon 9 Block 5	1082-25	SLC-4E	Transporter-18	Success
37	10 October 2026	Falcon 9 Block 5	1103-6	SLC-4E	SDA Tranche 1 Transport Layer A	Success
38	22 November 2026	Falcon 9 Block 5	1097-14	SLC-4E	NROL-136	Success
39	November 2026	Falcon 9 Block 5	10xx-x	SLC-4E	NROL-195	Planned

== Gallery ==
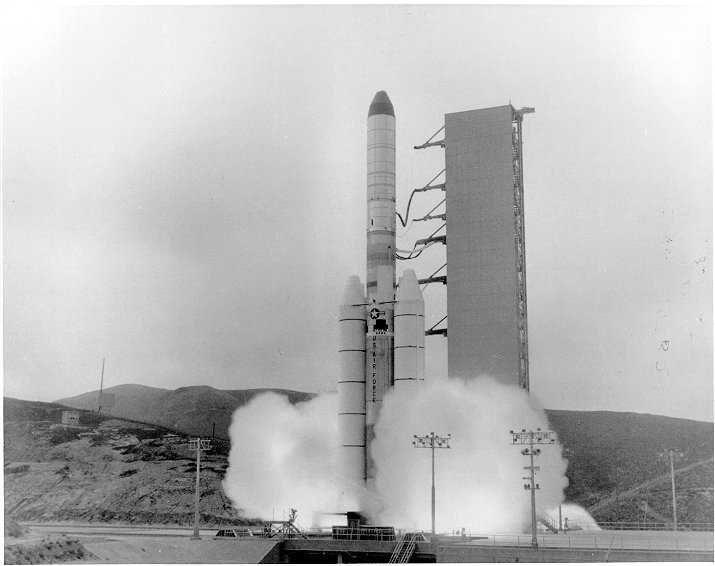
Titan IIID launch from SLC-4E

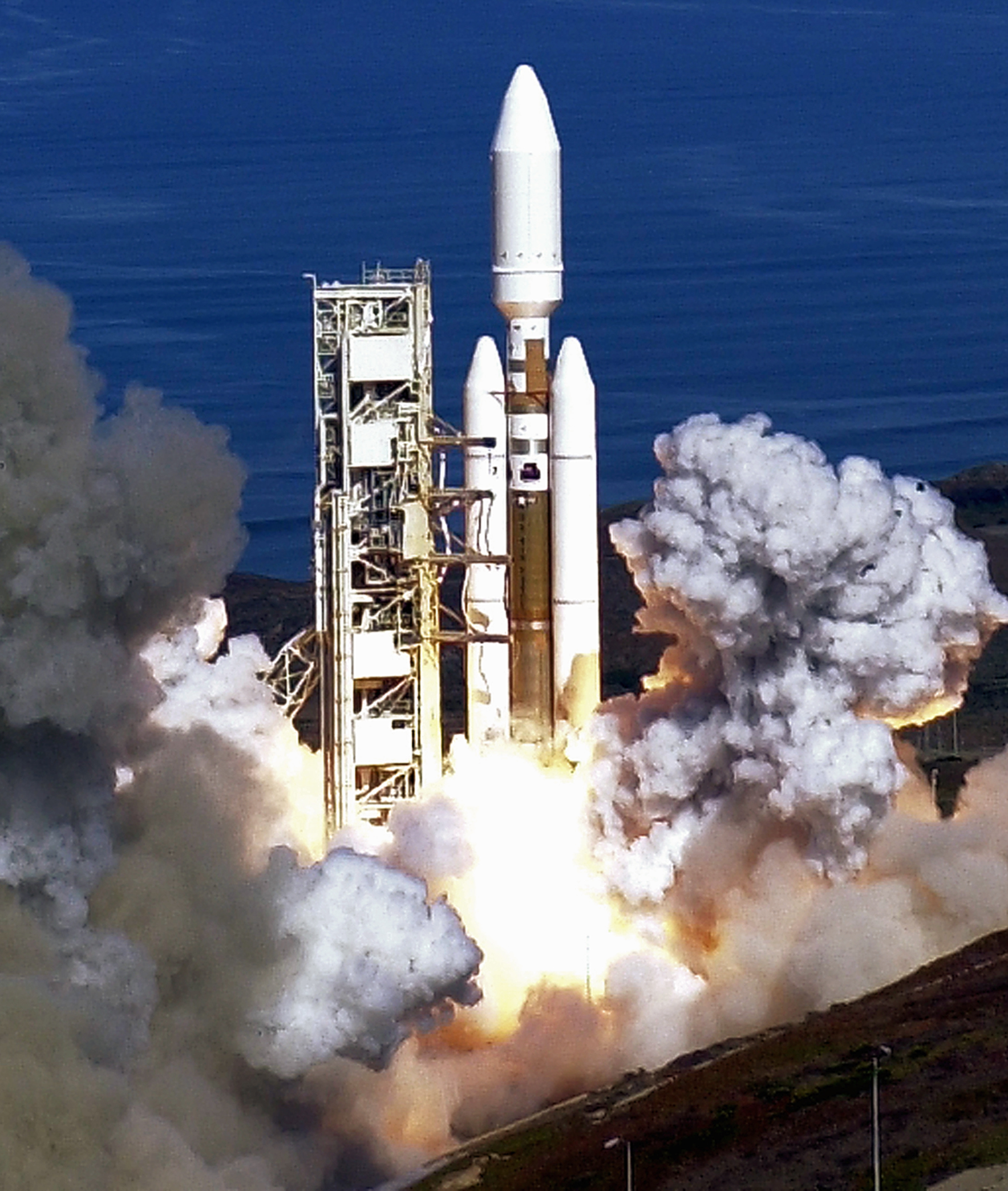
Final Titan IV launch from SLC-4E in 2005

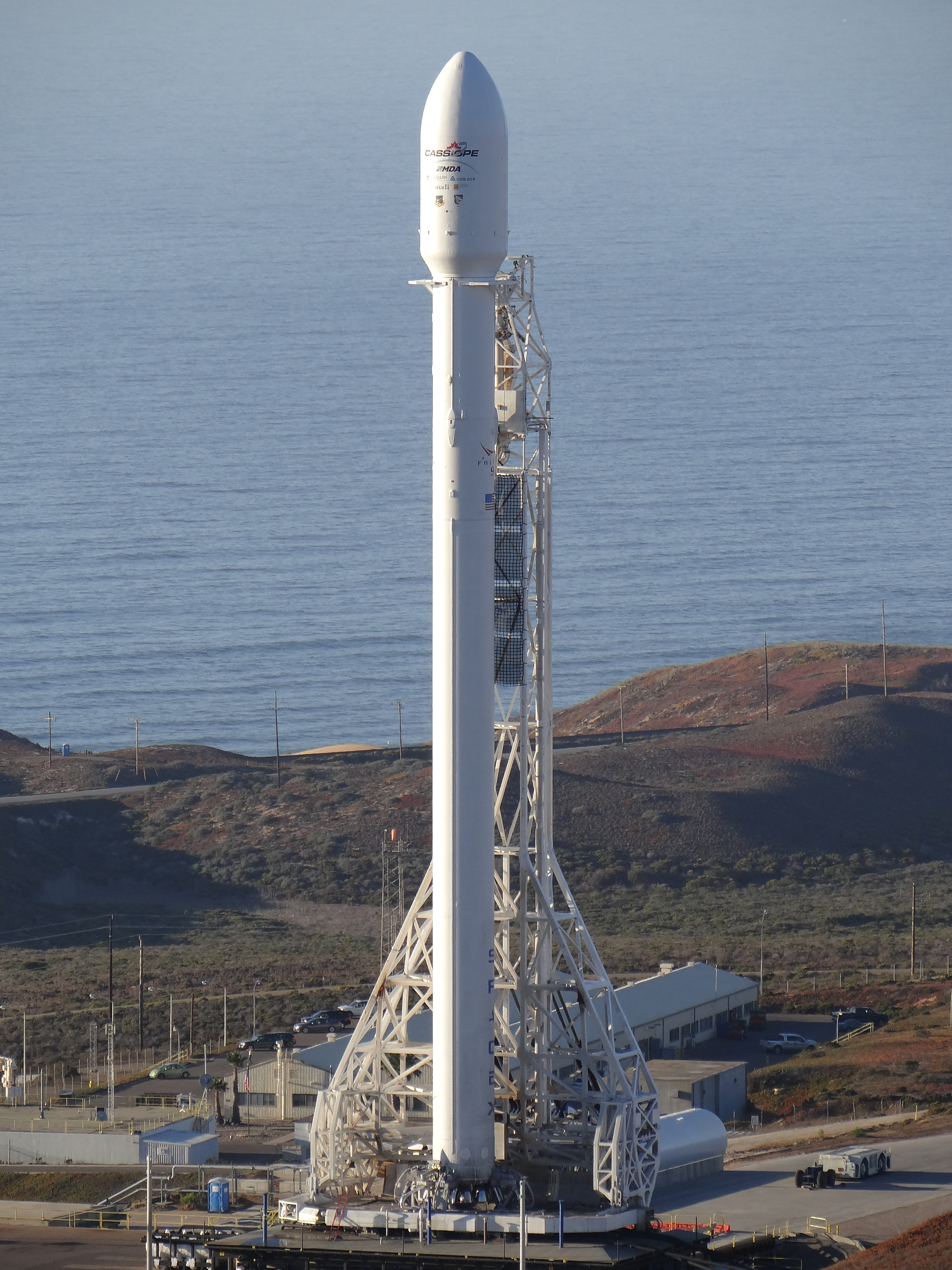
Inaugural mission of the Falcon 9 v1.1 from SLC-4E in September 2013

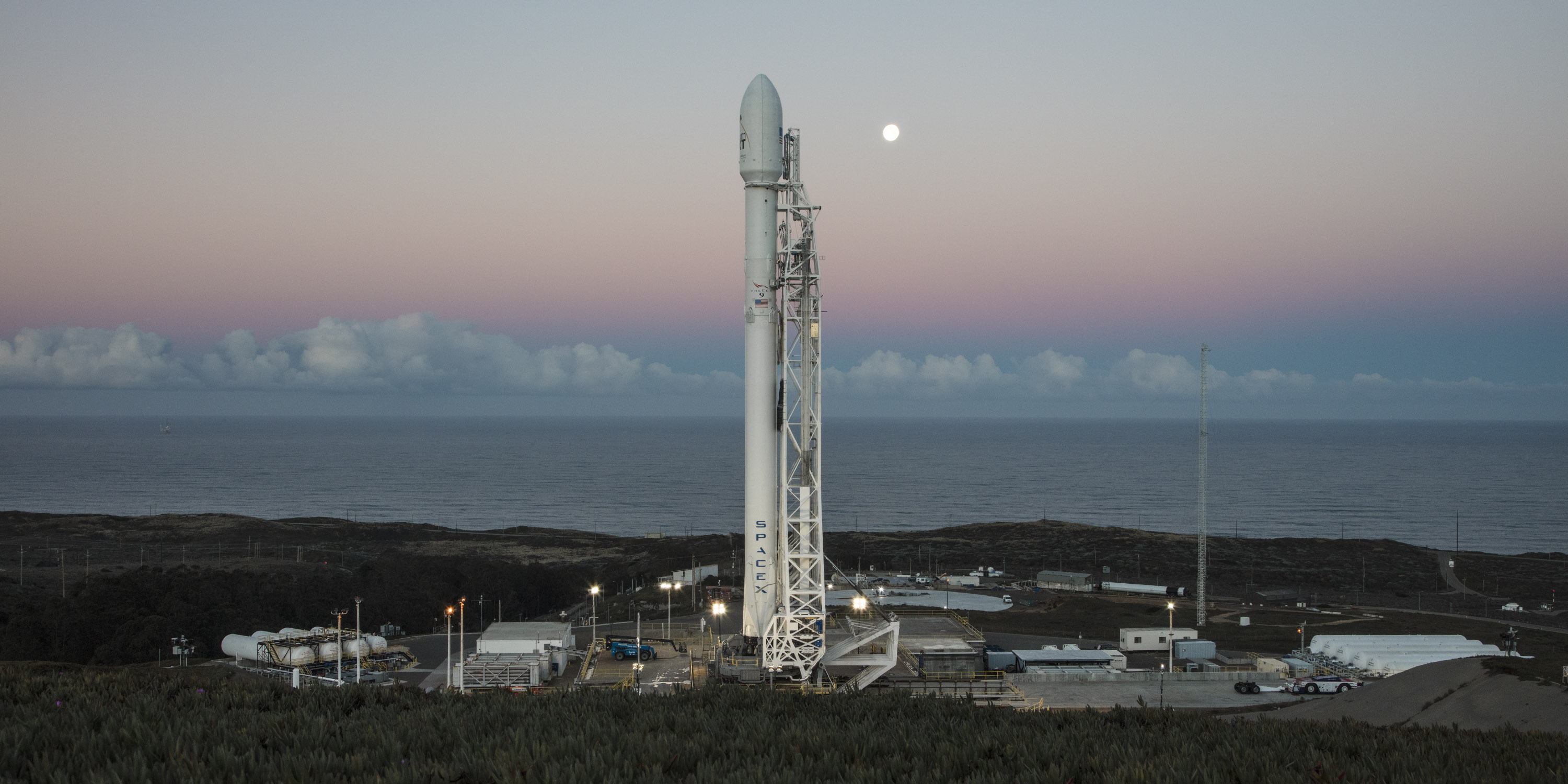
SLC-4 with Falcon 9 on launch pad at SLC-4E in January 2017 with Iridium NEXT satellites

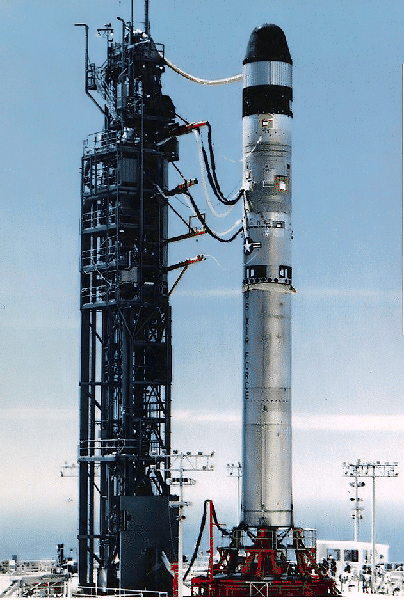
A Titan 23G on SLC-4W

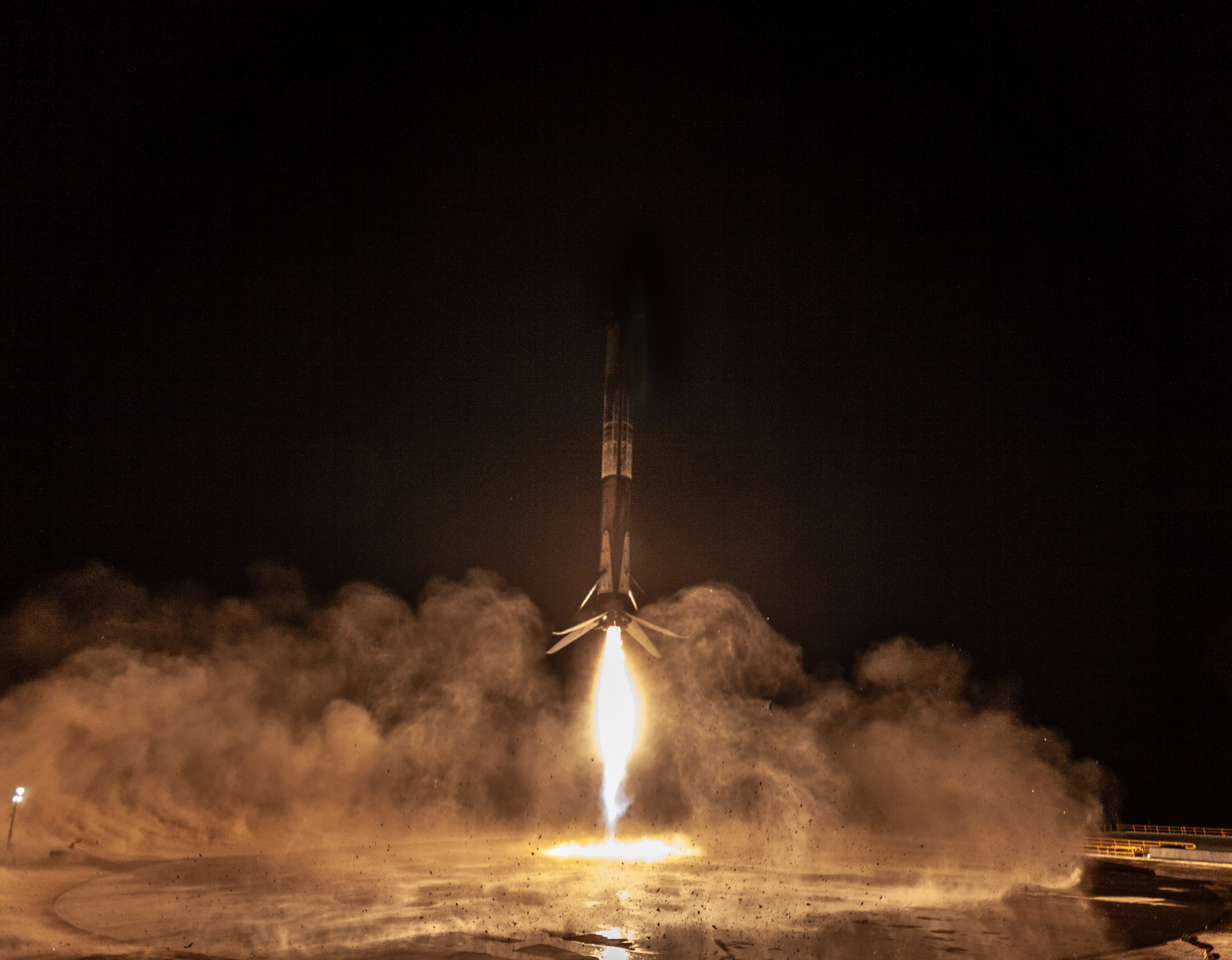
The landing of SAOCOM 1A, the first landing at LZ-4
