= Surface Water and Ocean Topography =

NASA/CNES oceanography mission (2022–present)

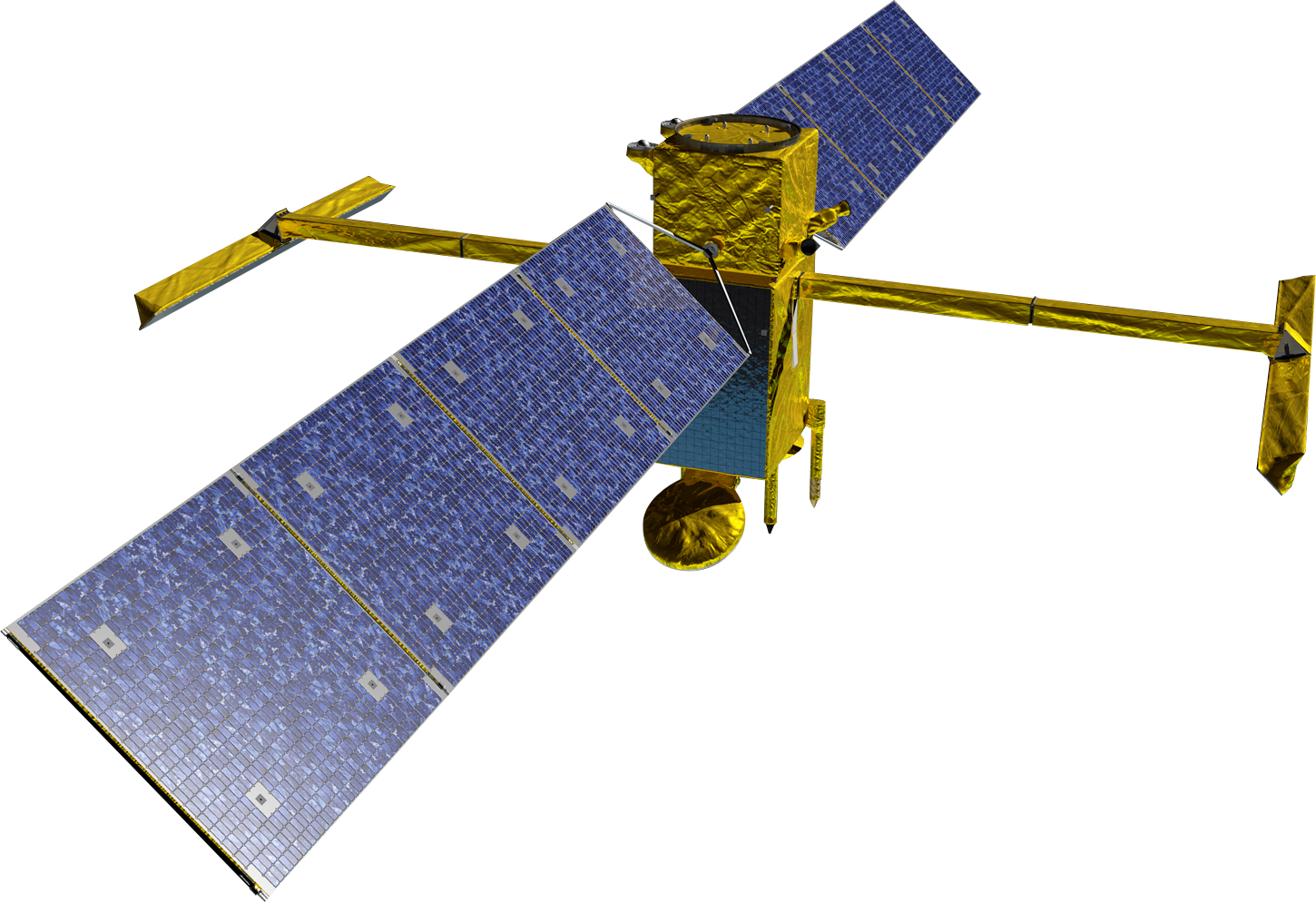
- Rendering of the SWOT satellite
- Names: SWOT; WATER HM
- Mission type: Hydrology / Oceanography
- Operator: NASA / CNES
- COSPAR ID: 2022-173A
- SATCAT no.: 54754
- Mission duration: Planned: 3 years Elapsed: 3 years, 6 months and 20 days

Spacecraft properties
- Manufacturer: Thales Alenia Space
- Launch mass: 2,200 kg (4,900 lb)
- Dimensions: 14.9 × 5 × 5 m (49 × 16 × 16 ft)
- Power: 8,000 watts

Start of mission
- Launch date: December 16, 2022, 11:46 UTC
- Rocket: Falcon 9 Block 5 B1071-6
- Launch site: Vandenberg, SLC-4E
- Contractor: SpaceX

Orbital parameters
- Reference system: Geocentric
- Regime: Low Earth orbit
- Periapsis altitude: 857 km (533 mi)
- Apoapsis altitude: 857 km (533 mi)
- Inclination: 77.6°
- Period: 102.89 minutes
- Repeat interval: 1 sidereal day
Instruments
- KaRIn: Ka-band Radar Interferometer
- AMR-C: Advanced Microwave Radiometer-C
- Altimeter: Nadir Altimeter
- DORIS: Doppler Orbitography and Radiopositioning Integrated by Satellites
- GPSP: Global Positioning System Payload
- LRA: Laser Retro-reflector Assembly
- Telecom: X-band Telecom
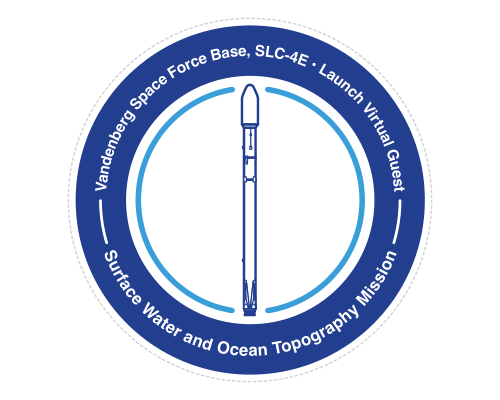
- Alternate SWOT Mission Patch by NASA

The Surface Water and Ocean Topography (SWOT) mission is a satellite altimeter jointly developed and operated by NASA and CNES, the French space agency, in partnership with the Canadian Space Agency (CSA) and UK Space Agency (UKSA). The objectives of the mission are to make the first global survey of the Earth's surface water, to observe the fine details of the ocean surface topography, and to measure how terrestrial surface water bodies change over time.

While past satellite missions like the Jason series altimeters (TOPEX/Poseidon, Jason-1, Jason-2, Jason-3) have provided variation in river and lake water surface elevations at select locations, SWOT will provide the first truly global observations of changing water levels, stream slopes, and inundation extents in rivers, lakes, and floodplains. In the world's oceans, SWOT will observe ocean circulation at unprecedented scales of 15–25 km (9.3–15.5 mi), approximately an order of magnitude finer than current satellites. It does this using synthetic aperture radar interferometry. Because it uses wide-swath altimetry technology, SWOT will almost completely observe the world's oceans and freshwater bodies with repeated high-resolution elevation measurements, allowing observations of variations.

== Context ==
SWOT builds on a long-standing partnership between NASA and CNES to measure the surface of the ocean using radar altimetry. This partnership began with the TOPEX/Poseidon mission (launched in 1992) and continued with the Jason series. SWOT brings together the hydrology and oceanography communities and will extend the precise, high-resolution surface topography observations into the coastal and estuarine regions.

== Scientific objectives ==
The mission's science goals are to:

- Provide sea surface heights and terrestrial water heights over a 120 km (75 mi) wide swath with a ±10 km (6.2 mi) gap at the nadir track.
- Over the deep oceans, provide sea surface heights within each swath with a posting every 2 km × 2 km (1.2 mi × 1.2 mi), and a precision not to exceed 2.7 cm (1.1 in) at 1 km × 1 km (0.62 mi × 0.62 mi), or 1.35 cm (0.53 in) at 2 km × 2 km (1.2 mi × 1.2 mi) when averaged over the area.
- Over land, download the raw data for ground processing and produce a water mask able to resolve 100 m (330 ft) wide rivers and 250 m × 250 m (820 ft × 820 ft) lakes and reservoirs. Associated with this mask will be water level elevations with an accuracy of 10 cm (3.9 in) for water bodies whose non-vegetated surface area exceeds 1 km^{2} (0.39 sq mi). The slope accuracy is 1.7 cm/km (1.1 in/mi) over a maximum 10 km (6.2 mi) of flow distance.
- The satellite will overfly Earth from 78° S to 78° N, covering at least 86% of the globe.

SWOT’s orbit extends from 78° S to 78° N, covering at least 86% of the globe in its three-year-long mission. SWOT revisits the same path all over the Earth every 21 days in 292 unique orbits.

== Applications ==
SWOT is designed for the study and monitoring of inland waters and the oceans, such as:

Management of water-sharing issues

The sharing of river water often causes friction between neighboring states, especially when there is no common technology for verification. SWOT will provide global information as input for systems monitoring transboundary river basins, including measurements of variations in reservoir water storage and estimates of river discharge.

More accurate weather and climate forecasting

SWOT will enable more accurate weather and climate forecasting, especially seasonally. The quality of weather and climate forecasting largely depends on numerical modeling that uses the state of the ocean surface and the hydrological conditions of catchment areas in their initial and boundary conditions.

Managing freshwater for urban, industrial, and agricultural consumption

Accurate knowledge of sources of available water is a key factor in decision-making for organizations involved in the distribution of water for agricultural, urban, and industrial needs. Data from SWOT will contribute at a global level by providing water supply services and distribution companies with information about major reservoirs and the largest rivers and catchment areas, thus enabling them to plan the management of water stocks further into the future.

Improved flood modeling

Flooding, whether from rivers overflowing their banks or in coastal regions, is among the most costly natural disasters. Altimetry data from the SWOT mission will make it possible to measure the 3-dimensional shape of flood waves, track floodwater levels, and improve measurements of local topographic details in floodplains. All of these will improve prediction capabilities for future floods.

Coastal ocean dynamics

Coastal ocean dynamics are important for many societal applications. They have smaller spatial and temporal scales than the dynamics of the open ocean and require finer-scale monitoring. SWOT will provide global, high-resolution observations in coastal regions for observing coastal currents and storm surges. While SWOT is not designed to monitor the fast temporal changes of the coastal processes, the swath coverage will allow us to characterize the spatial structure of their dynamics when they occur within the swath.

Reducing environmental risk and contributing to public policy-making

More broadly, SWOT enhances the global observation of water storage and fluxes, providing unique data to clarify the physics of ocean dynamics and the terrestrial water cycle. This data has practical applications across multiple disciplines, from disaster mitigation—such as flood and hurricane forecasting—to the management of agricultural, energy, and public health resources.

== Sensor payload ==
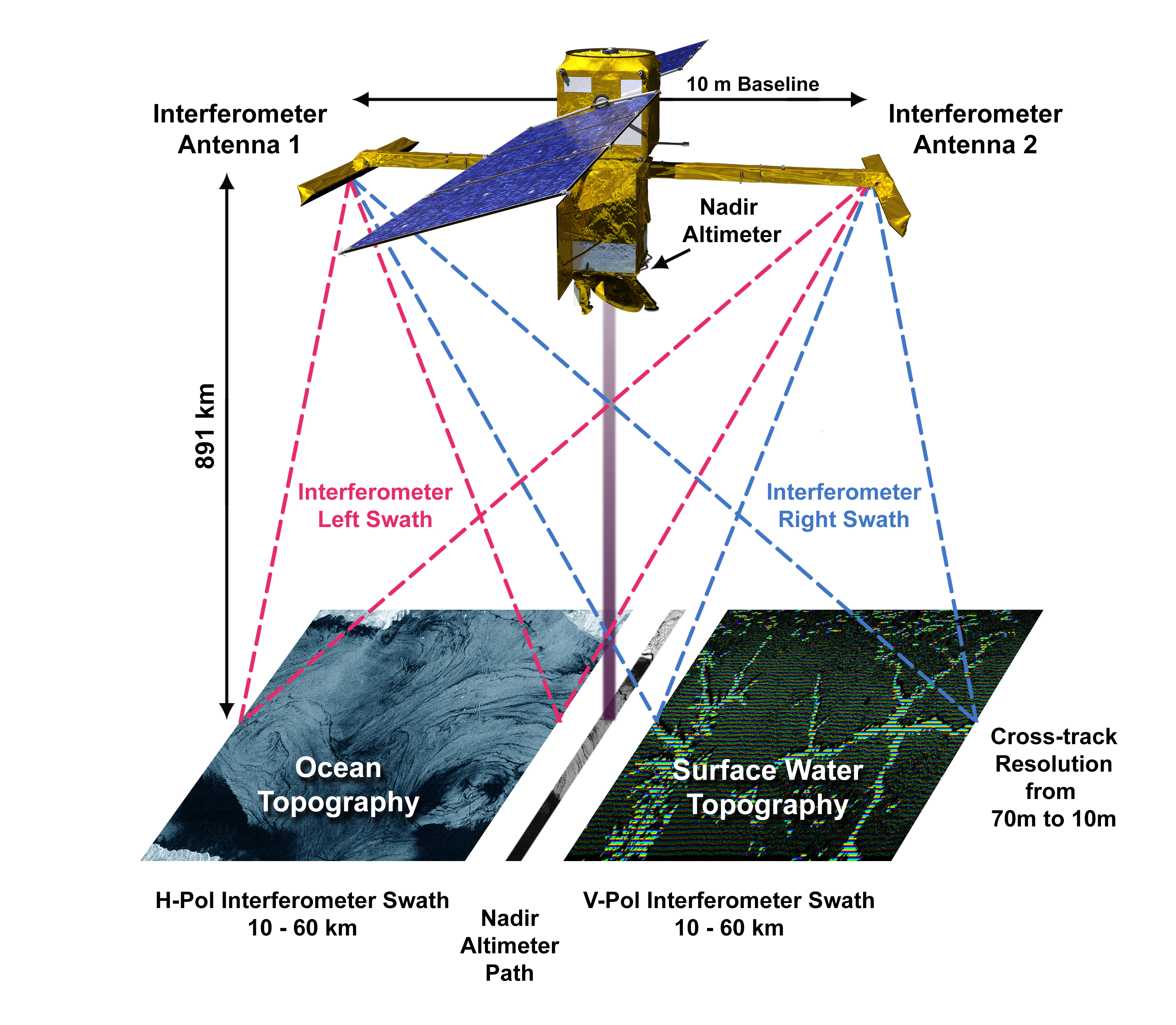
Diagram of SWOT data collection

The primary instrument on SWOT is the Ka-band Radar Interferometer (KaRIn), which uses synthetic-aperture radar (SAR) technology, especially SAR interferometry. Because SWOT operates at Ka-band's relatively short wavelengths, 11–7 mm (27–43 GHz) – compared to the Ku-band Jason series, 25–17 mm (12–18 GHz) – and at near-nadir incidence angles (<5°), it is designed to be uniquely appropriate for measuring water surface elevations and inundation extents.

The satellite will fly two radar antennas at either end of a 10 m (33 ft) mast, allowing it to measure the elevation of the surface across a 120 km (75 mi) wide swath. The new radar system is smaller than, but similar to, the one that flew on NASA's Shuttle Radar Topography Mission (SRTM), which made high-resolution measurements of Earth's land surface in 2000.

A conventional nadir radar altimeter will also be flown, and measure just beneath the satellite, as was done on the Topex/Poseidon, Jason series, and SARAL missions. It is a "Jason-class" altimeter.

== History ==
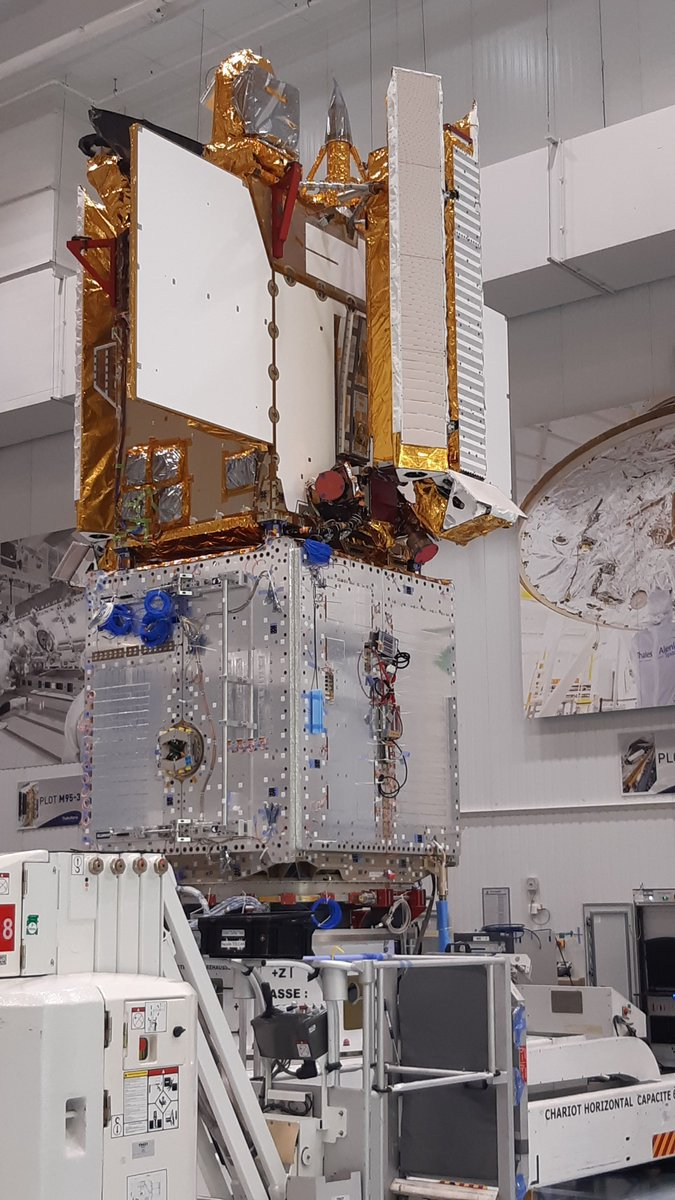
Mating of SWOT Payload on satellite platform made in Thales Alenia Space Cannes Center

SWOT was developed by an international group of hydrologists and oceanographers to provide a better understanding of the world's oceans and its terrestrial surface waters. It will give scientists their first comprehensive view of Earth's freshwater bodies from space and much more detailed measurements of the ocean surface than ever before. By 2019 the mission hardware was under active construction, algorithms to produce hydrology and oceanography data products were under final development, and calibration/validation methods and post-launch activities were being finalized. The spacecraft launched on a SpaceX Falcon 9 on 16 December 2022.

The mating of the payload made by Jet Propulsion Laboratory (JPL) took place on 11 August 2021 at Thales Alenia Space Cannes Center, France.

== See also ==
- Jason-3
