= KH-8 Gambit 3 =

Series of United States reconnaissance satellites

KH-8 GAMBIT
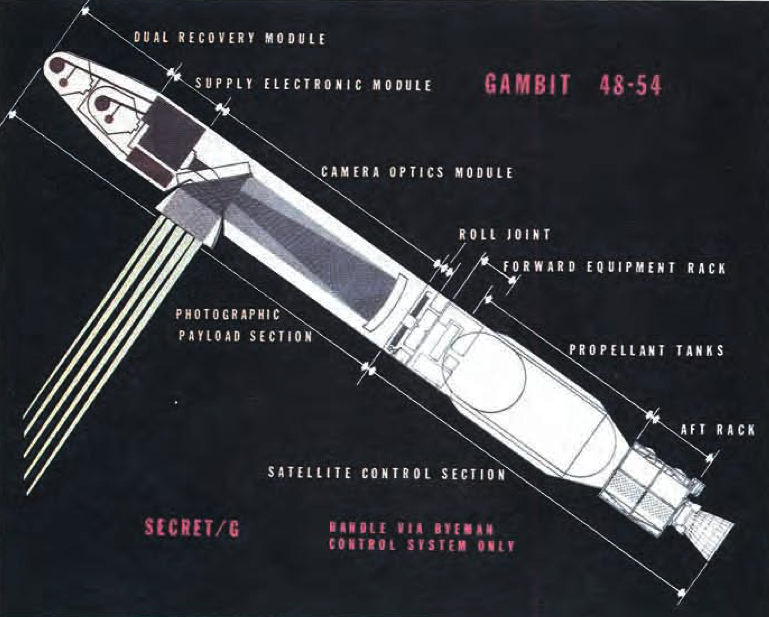
- Schematics of GAMBIT-3 and Agena D
- Mission type: Imagery intelligence
- Operator: National Reconnaissance Office

Spacecraft properties
- Manufacturer: Lockheed (satellite vehicle); Eastman Kodak (camera)
- Launch mass: 4100 kg (on orbit)
- Dimensions: 14.75 m × 1.52 m (48.4 ft × 5.0 ft)

Start of mission
- Rocket: Titan III
- Launch site: Vandenberg Air Force Base, SLC-4E
- Contractor: Martin Marietta

Orbital parameters
- Reference system: Sun-synchronous orbit
- Regime: Low Earth orbit
- Perigee altitude: 135 km (84 mi)
- Apogee altitude: 305 km (190 mi)
- Inclination: 110.5°

Main telescope
- Type: Aspheric reflector with five-element Ross corrector
- Diameter: 1.1 m (3 ft 7 in)
- Focal length: 4.46 m (14.6 ft)
- Focal ratio: f/4.09
- Wavelengths: visible light, Near-infrared
Instruments
- MC: Main Camera
- APTC: Astro-Position Terrain Camera

The KH-8 (BYEMAN codename Gambit-3) was a long-lived series of reconnaissance satellites of the "Key Hole" (KH) series used by the United States from July 1966 to April 1984, and also known as Low Altitude Surveillance Platform. The satellite ejected "film-bucket" canisters of photographic film that were retrieved as they descended through the atmosphere by parachute. Ground resolution of the mature satellite system was better than 4 inches (0.10 m). There were 54 launch attempts of the 3,000 kilogram satellites, all from Vandenberg Air Force Base, on variants of the Titan III rocket. Three launches failed to achieve orbit. The first one was satellite #5 on April 26, 1967, which fell into the Pacific Ocean after the Titan second stage developed low thrust. The second was satellite #35 on May 20, 1972, which suffered an Agena pneumatic regulator failure and reentered the atmosphere. A few months later, pieces of the satellite turned up in England and the US managed to arrange for their hasty return. The third failure was satellite #39 on June 26, 1973, which suffered a stuck Agena fuel valve. The Bell 8096 engine failed to start and the satellite burned up in the atmosphere.

The KH-8 was manufactured by Lockheed, and the camera system was manufactured by Eastman Kodak's A&O Division in Rochester, New York.

The Gambit codename was also used by the satellite's predecessor, the KH-7 Gambit.

Gambit 3 satellites were the same width as the Gambit 1 models, but also slightly longer – reaching about 29 feet (8.8 m) in length. They carried 12,241 feet (3,731 meters) of film and were designed for longer missions of up to 31 days.

While Gambit was primarily designed and operated as a surveillance satellite, capturing high definition images of specific targets at low orbital altitudes, a single Gambit Block 3 mission was operated in 'dual-mode', orbiting first at a higher altitude to capture wide-area search imagery before lowering its perigee to capture normal surveillance imagery. The first film return capsule failed to separate correctly due to a new pyro mechanism failing to perform correctly. The contingency release mechanism separated the film bucket and parachute from its return capsule, and left the film bucket stranded in orbit. In September 2002, the film bucket re-entered over the South Atlantic into deep water. As the film bucket lacked its protective heatshield or the parachute needed to slow its descent, no attempt was made to recover it.

== Camera Optics Module ==
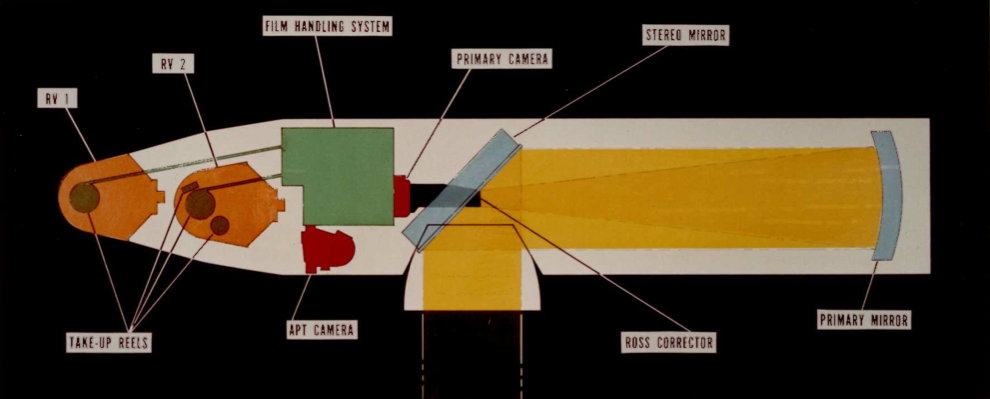
KH-8 GAMBIT-3 Photographic Payload Section

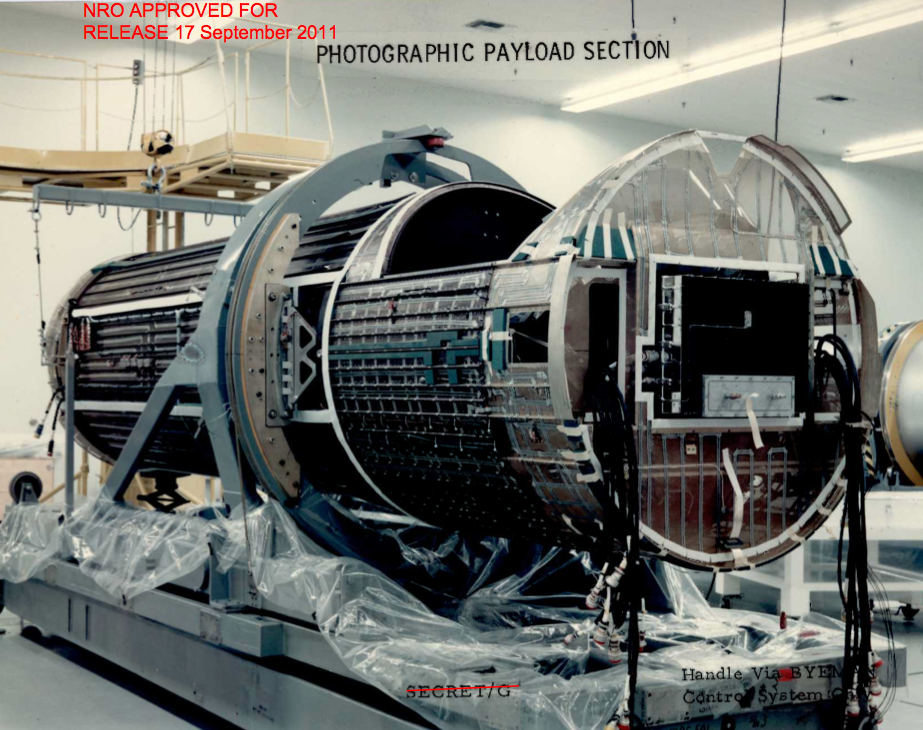
KH-8 Photographic Payload Section

The Camera Optics Module of KH-8 consists of four cameras.

The main camera of KH-8B (introduced in 1971) with a focal length of 175.6 in (4.46 m) is a single strip camera, designed to gather high-resolution images of ground targets. In the strip camera the ground image is reflected by a steerable flat mirror to a 1.21 m (48 in) diameter stationary concave primary mirror. The primary mirror reflects the light through an opening in the flat mirror and through a Ross corrector. At periapsis altitude of 75 nautical miles (139 km), the main camera imaged a 6.3 km wide ground swath on a 8.811 in (223.8 mm) wide moving portion of film through a small slit aperture, resulting in an image scale of 28 meter / millimeter. The Astro-Position Terrain Camera (APTC) contains three cameras: a 75mm focal length terrain frame camera, and two 90mm focal length stellar cameras. The terrain frame camera takes exposures of Earth in direction of the vehicle roll position for attitude determination. The stellar cameras observed in 180 degree opposite directions and took images of star fields.

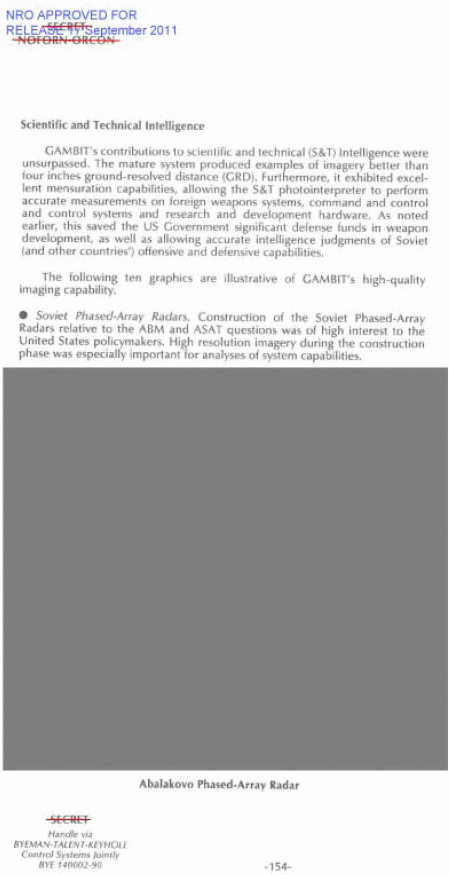
Ground-resolution distance achievable by KH-8

The films used by GAMBIT were provided by Eastman Kodak, and evolved through a series of successively higher definition films, starting with Type 3404 with a resolving power of 50 to 100 line pairs per mm. Subsequent films used were Type 1414 high-definition film, SO-217 high-definition fine-grain film, and a series of films with silver-halide crystals of very uniform size and shape. The size of silver-halide crystals decreased from 1,550 angstrom in film Type SO-315, to 1,200 angstrom in SO-312, and ultimately to 900 angstrom in SO-409. Under optimal conditions GAMBIT would thus have been able to record ground features as small as 0.28 to 0.56 m (0.92 to 1.84 ft) using the Eastman Kodak Type 3404 film. Using a film with a resolving power equivalent to the Kodak's Type 3409 film of 320 to 630 line pairs per mm, GAMBIT would have been able to record ground features as small as 5 cm to 10 cm (2" to 4"). The initial September 2011 release of "The Gambit Story" quotes "The mature system produced examples of imagery better than four inches ground-resolution distance". This number was again redacted in a later release. Five to ten centimeters corresponds to the resolution limit imposed by atmospheric turbulence as derived by Fried and, independently, Evvard in the mid-1960s; remarkably, GAMBIT had reached a physical limit on resolution only a few years after the US launched its first reconnaissance satellite. GAMBIT was also able to record objects in orbit. The capability was developed to photograph Soviet spacecraft, but was first used to aid NASA engineers designing repairs for the damaged Skylab space station in 1973.

== Missions ==
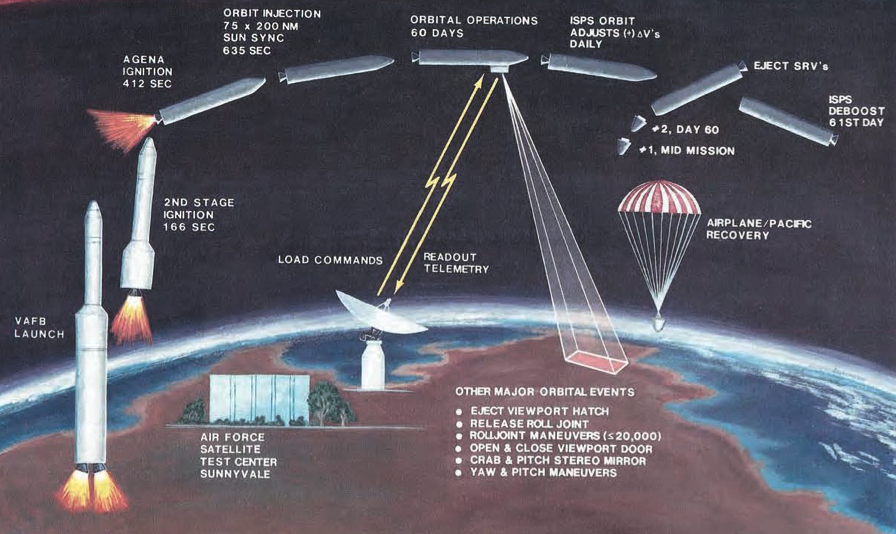
Ascent and Orbital events for GAMBIT-3 missions

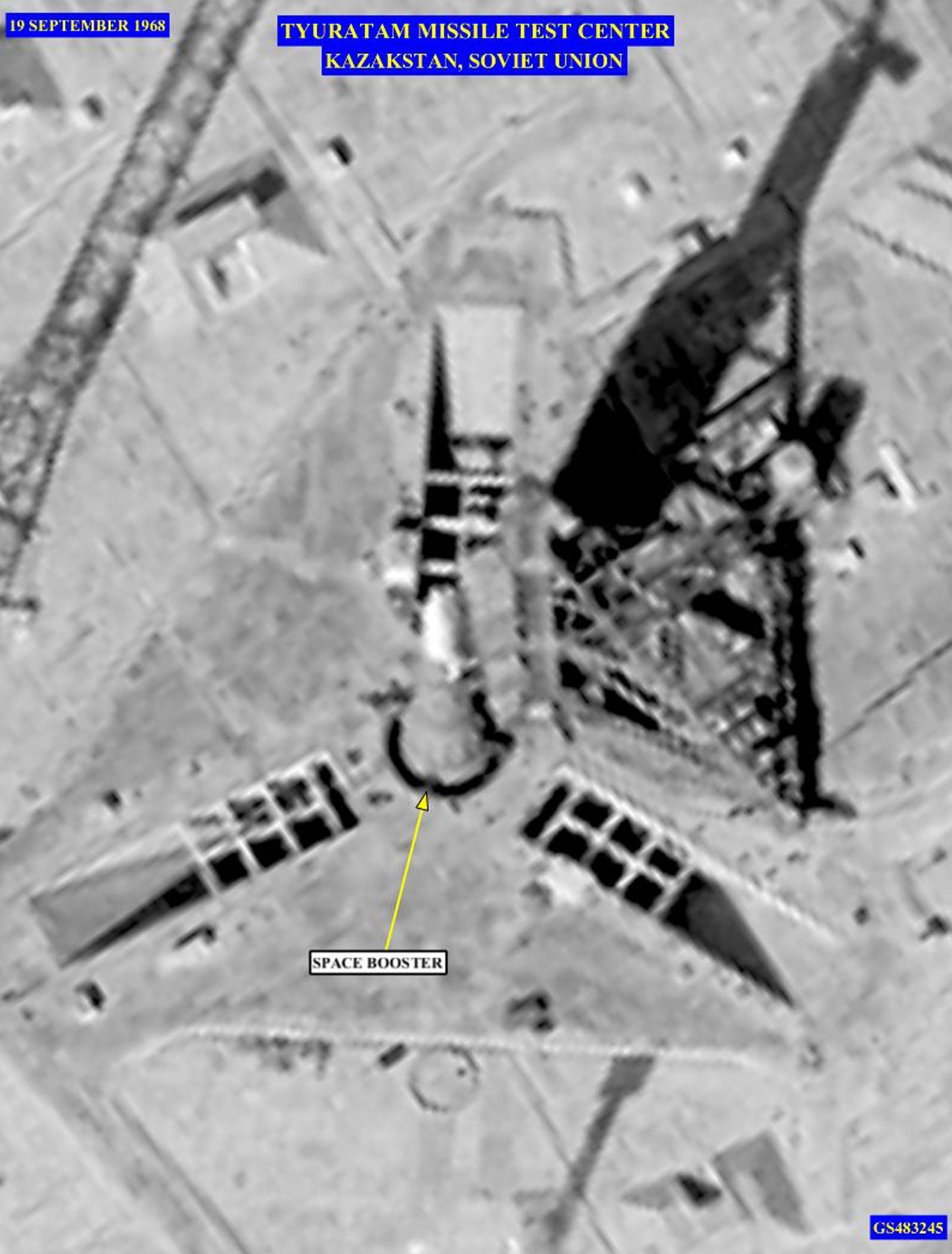
N1 (rocket) imaged by KH-8 Gambit on 19 September 1968

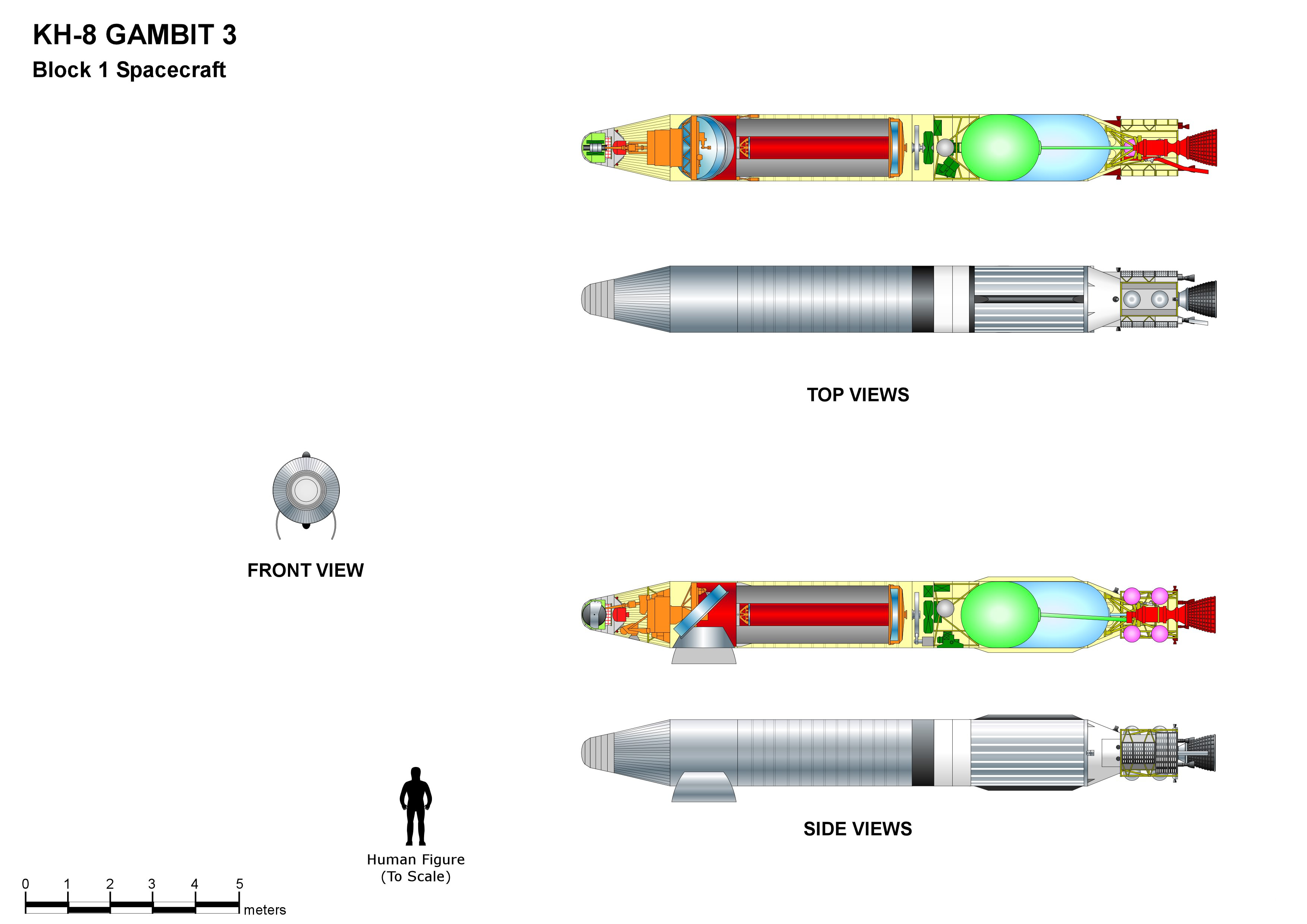
KH-8 GAMBIT 3 (Block 1) main features

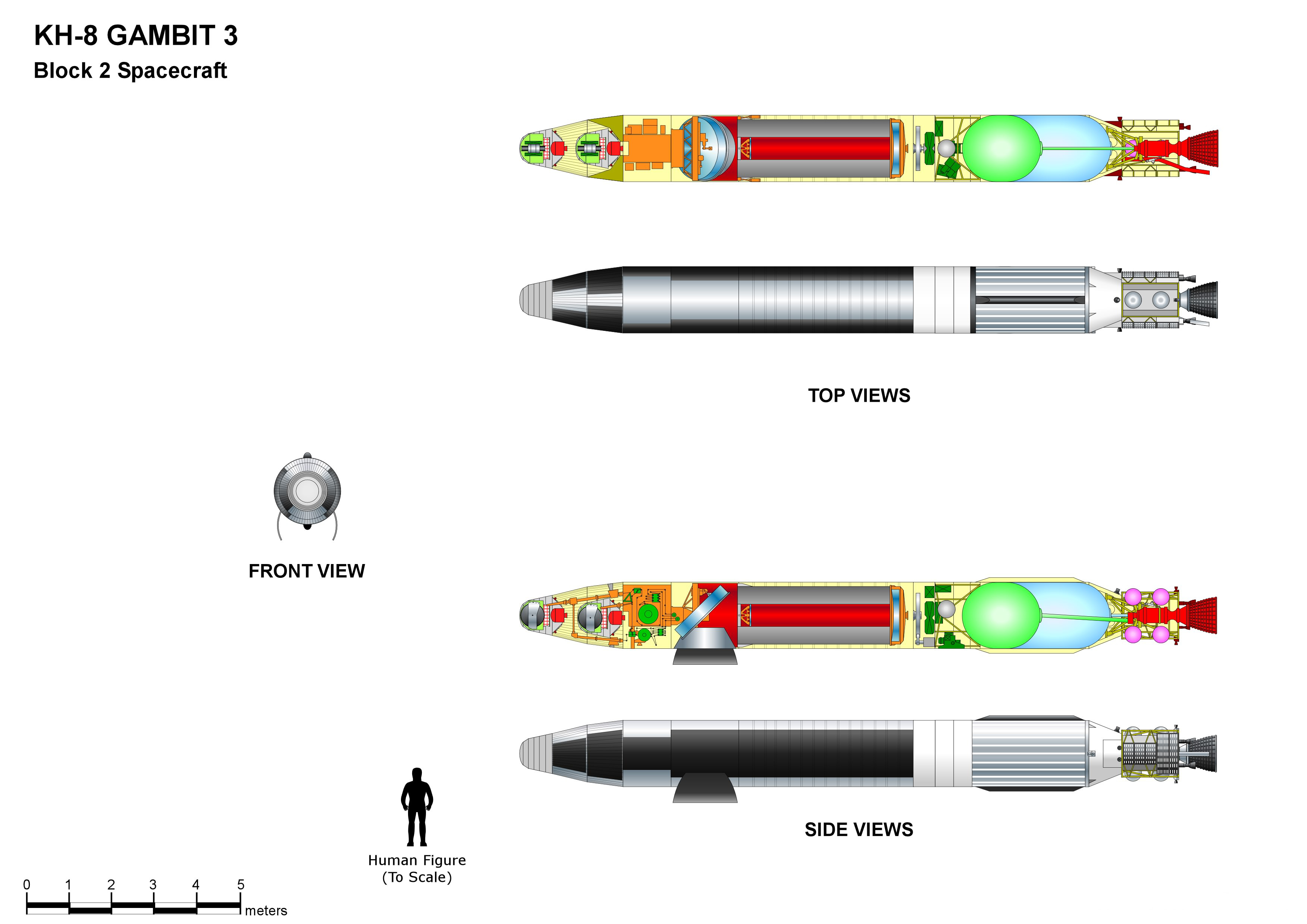
KH-8 GAMBIT 3 (Block 2) main features

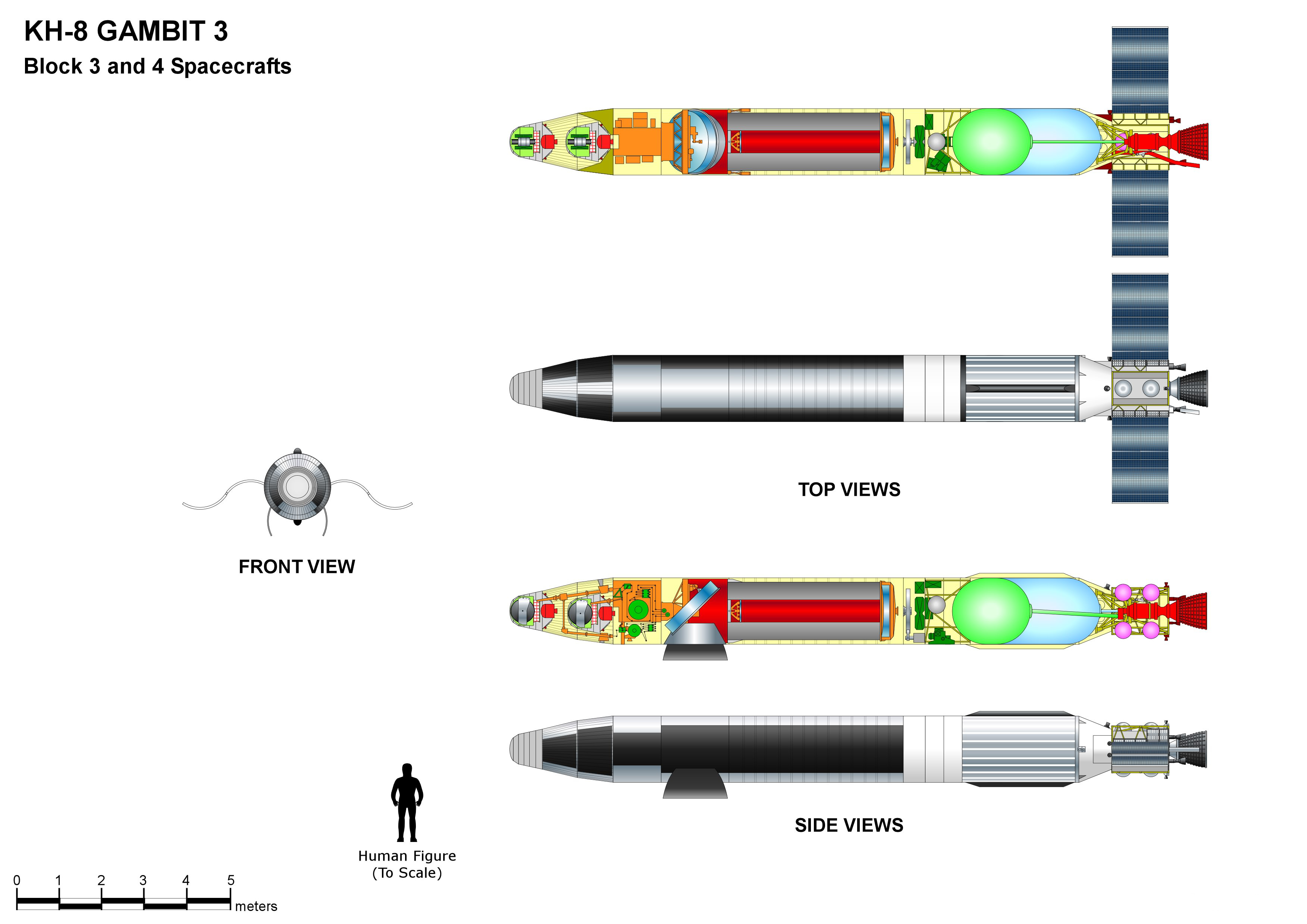
KH-8 GAMBIT 3 (Block 3 & 4) main features

Name	Block	Launch Date	Alt. Name	NSSDC ID No.	Launch Vehicle	Orbit	Decay date
KH8-1	I	1966-07-29	OPS-3014	1966-069A	Titan IIIB	158.0 km × 250.0 km, i=94.1°	1966-08-06
KH8-2	I	1966-09-28	OPS-4096	1966-086A	Titan IIIB		
KH8-3	I	1966-12-14	OPS-8968	1966-113A	Titan IIIB		
KH8-4	I	1967-02-24	OPS-4204	1967-016A	Titan IIIB		
KH8-5	I	1967-04-26	OPS-4243	1967-F04, 1967-003X	Titan IIIB	no stable orbit	1967-04-26
KH8-6	I	1967-06-20	OPS-4282	1967-064A	Titan IIIB		
KH8-7	I	1967-08-16	OPS-4886	1967-079A	Titan IIIB		
KH8-8	I	1967-09-19	OPS-4941	1967-090A	Titan IIIB		
KH8-9	I	1967-10-25	OPS-4995	1967-103A	Titan IIIB		
KH8-10	I	1967-12-05	OPS-5000	1967-121A	Titan IIIB		
KH8-11	I	1968-01-18	OPS-5028	1968-005A	Titan IIIB		
KH8-12	I	1968-03-13	OPS-5057	1968-018A	Titan IIIB		
KH8-13	I	1968-04-17	OPS-5105	1968-031A	Titan IIIB		
KH8-14	I	1968-06-05	OPS-5138	1968-047A	Titan IIIB		
KH8-15	I	1968-08-06	OPS-5187	1968-064A	Titan IIIB		
KH8-16	I	1968-09-10	OPS-5247	1968-074A	Titan IIIB		
KH8-17	I	1968-11-06	OPS-5296	1968-099A	Titan IIIB		
KH8-18	I	1968-12-04	OPS-6518	1968-108A	Titan IIIB		
KH8-19	I	1969-01-22	OPS-7585	1969-007A	Titan IIIB		
KH8-20	I	1969-03-04	OPS-4248	1969-019A	Titan IIIB		
KH8-21	I	1969-04-15	OPS-5310	1969-039A	Titan IIIB		
KH8-22	I	1969-06-03	OPS-1077	1969-050A	Titan IIIB		
KH8-23	II	1969-08-23	OPS-7807	1969-074A	Titan 23B		
KH8-24	II	1969-10-24	OPS-8455	1969-095A	Titan 23B		
KH8-25	II	1970-01-14	OPS-6531	1970-002A	Titan 23B		
KH8-26	II	1970-04-15	OPS-2863	1970-031A	Titan 23B		
KH8-27	II	1970-06-25	OPS-6820	1970-048A	Titan 23B		
KH8-28	II	1970-08-18	OPS-7874	1970-061A	Titan 23B		
KH8-29	II	1970-10-23	OPS-7568	1970-090A	Titan 23B		
KH8-30	II	1971-01-21	OPS-7776	1971-005A	Titan 23B	139.0 km × 418.0 km, i=110.8°	1971-02-09
KH8-31	II	1971-04-22	OPS-7899	1971-033A	Titan 23B	132.0 km × 401.0 km, i=110.9°	1971-05-13
KH8-32	II	1971-08-12	OPS-8607	1971-070A	Titan 24B	137.0 km × 424.0 km, i=111.0°	1971-09-03
KH8-33	II	1971-10-23	OPS-7616	1971-092A	Titan 24B	134.0 km × 416.0 km, i=110.9°	1971-11-17
KH8-34	II	1972-03-17	OPS-1678	1972-016A	Titan 24B	131.0 km × 409.0 km, i=111.0°	1972-04-11
KH8-35	II	1972-05-20	OPS-6574	1972-F03	Titan 24B	failed to reach orbit	
KH8-36	II	1972-09-01	OPS-8888	1972-068A	Titan 24B	140.0 km × 380.0 km, i=110.5°	1972-09-30
KH8-37	III	1972-12-21	OPS-3978	1972-103A	Titan 24B	139.0 km × 378.0 km, i=110.5°	1973-01-23
KH8-38	III	1973-05-16	OPS-2093	1973-028A	Titan 24B	139.0 km × 399.0 km, i=110.5°	1973-06-13
KH8-39	III	1973-06-26	OPS-4018	1973-F04	Titan 24B	failed to reach orbit	(mix-up with KH8-38 in NSSDC)
KH8-40	III	1973-09-27	OPS-6275	1973-068A	Titan 24B	131.0 km × 385.0 km, i=110.5°	1973-10-29
KH8-41	III	1974-02-13	OPS-6889	1974-007A	Titan 24B	134.0 km × 393.0 km, i=110.4°	1974-03-17
KH8-42	III	1974-06-06	OPS-1776	1974-042A	Titan 24B	136.0 km × 394.0 km, i=110.5°	1974-07-24
KH8-43	III	1974-08-14	OPS-3004	1974-065A	Titan 24B	135.0 km × 402.0 km, i=110.5°	1974-09-29
KH8-44	III	1975-04-18	OPS-4883	1975-032A	Titan 24B	134.0 km × 401.0 km, i=110.5°	1975-06-05
KH8-45	III	1975-10-09	OPS-5499	1975-098A	Titan 24B	125.0 km × 356.0 km, i=96.4°	1975-11-30
KH8-46	III	1976-03-22	OPS-7600	1976-027A	Titan 24B	125.0 km × 347.0 km, i=96.4°	1976-05-18
KH8-47	III	1976-09-15	OPS-8533	1976-094A	Titan 24B	135.0 km × 330.0 km, i=96.4°	1976-11-05
KH8-48	IV	1977-03-13	OPS-4915	1977-019A	Titan 24B	124.0 km × 348.0 km, i=96.4°	1977-05-26
KH8-49	IV	1977-09-23	OPS-7471	1977-094A	Titan 24B	125.0 km × 352.0 km, i=96.5°	1977-12-08
KH8-50	IV	1979-05-28	OPS-7164	1979-044A	Titan 24B	124.0 km × 305.0 km, i=96.4°	1979-08-26
KH8-51	IV	1981-02-28	OPS-1166	1981-019A	Titan 24B	138.0 km × 336.0 km, i=96.4°	1981-06-20
KH8-52	IV	1982-01-21	OPS-2849	1982-006A	Titan 24B	630.0 km × 641.0 km, i=97.4°	1982-05-23
KH8-53	IV	1983-04-15	OPS-2925	1983-032A	Titan 24B	124.0 km × 254.0 km, i=96.5°	1983-08-21
KH8-54	IV	1984-04-17	OPS-8424	1984-039A	Titan 24B	127.0 km × 235.0 km, i=96.4°	1984-08-13

(NSSDC ID Numbers: See COSPAR)

== Notable Missions ==
In May 1973 Gambit KH8-38 was used to observe the crippled Skylab space station, as part of the preparation for repairing it by the Skylab 2 mission.

== Cost ==
The total cost of the 54 flight KH-8 program from FY1964 to FY1985, without non-recurring costs, was US$2.3 billion in respective year dollars.

== Other U.S. imaging spy satellites ==
- Corona series: KH-1, KH-2, KH-3, KH-4
- KH-5 ARGON, KH-6 LANYARD
- KH-7 Gambit and KH-8 GAMBIT
- KH-9 Hexagon "Big Bird"
- MOL – KH-10
- KH-11 Kennen, Misty (classified project), Enhanced Imaging System
