= KH-13 =

KH-13 is an unofficial designation which may refer to several US reconnaissance satellite programmes; a continuation of the Key Hole series which officially ended at KH-11:

- Misty (classified project)
- Enhanced Imaging System
- Future Imagery Architecture
- Any successor to the KH-11 satellites

Others uses:

- KH-13 is the ISO 3166-2 code for Cambodia's Preah Vihear Province
