= Key Hole =

Key Hole (KH) is the designation for a series of American optical reconnaissance satellites:

- KH-1 Corona
- KH-2 Corona
- KH-3 Corona
- KH-4 Corona
- KH-5 Argon
- KH-6 Lanyard
- KH-7 Gambit
- KH-8 Gambit 3
- KH-9 Hexagon/Big Bird
- KH-10 Dorian/Manned Orbiting Laboratory
- KH-11 Crystal/Kennan
- KH-12 Improved Crystal/Ikon/Advanced Kennan
- KH-13 (unofficial designation, sometimes applied to Enhanced Imaging System or Misty)
