= Blackjack (satellite) =

Constellation of American surveillance satellites

- Mission type: Technology demonstrator, Reconnaissance
- Operator: DARPA

Spacecraft properties
- Spacecraft: Blackjack
- Bus: Blue Canyon Technologies
- Manufacturer: Lockheed Martin

Start of mission
- Launch date: June 12th, 2023

Orbital parameters
- Reference system: Geocentric orbit
- Regime: Low Earth orbit

Blackjack is a constellation of small American surveillance satellites that started to be launched in 2023. The Blackjack program was started by DARPA in 2017, with contracts awarded in 2020. The Blackjack constellation will replace or complement larger systems such as Misty and KH-11. These new orbiters will be cheaper, more numerous and with shorter lifespans than existing systems.

The new devices can be launched more covertly, may be more difficult to track and attack, and would be constantly replaced by new versions as older ones fall back to Earth. Each would have limited capabilities, but would operate as part of a constellation of twenty satellites networked together. Costs would be reduced by using the common commercial satellite buses now available. In mid 2020, open sources indicated the first two satellites would be launched in the third quarter of 2021. As of January 2022, the first four satellites of the constellation are scheduled to launch in fall 2022. On June 12, 2023, the first four satellites were launched from Vandenberg Space Force Base.

== Blackjack missions ==
On June 12, 2023, the first four satellites were launched on a SpaceX Rideshare mission. The mission, named Transporter 8, lifted off from Space Launch Complex 4E (SLC-4E) at Vandenberg Space Force Base at 2:35 pm local time.

Name	NSSDC ID	Launch date (UTC)	Launch vehicle	Launch site	Launch mission	Series
Blackjack Aces-1	2023-084AA	June 12th, 2023 21:19	Falcon 9	VSFB SLC-4E	Transporter 8	Aces
Blackjack Aces-2	2023-084Z	June 12th, 2023 21:19	Falcon 9	VSFB SLC-4E	Transporter 8	Aces
Blackjack Aces-3	2023-084U	June 12th, 2023 21:19	Falcon 9	VSFB SLC-4E	Transporter 8	Aces
Blackjack Aces-4	2023-084W	June 12th, 2023 21:19	Falcon 9	VSFB SLC-4E	Transporter 8	Aces

== See also ==
- Enhanced Imaging System
- Future Imagery Architecture
