= USA-215 =

American radar reconnaissance satellite

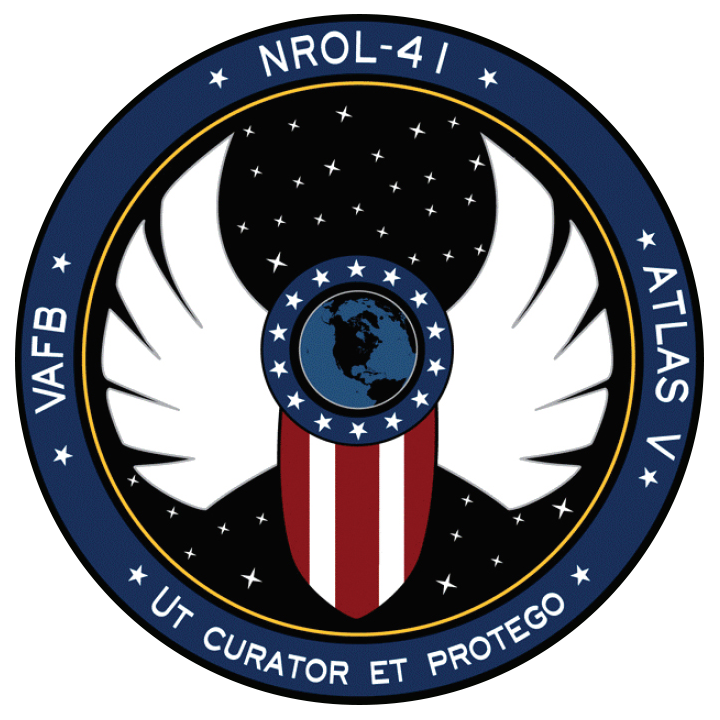
- Names: NRO Launch 41; NROL-41; Gladys
- Mission type: Imaging radar
- Operator: National Reconnaissance Office (NRO)
- COSPAR ID: 2010-046A
- SATCAT no.: 37162

Spacecraft properties
- Spacecraft type: FIA Radar
- Manufacturer: Lockheed Martin

Start of mission
- Launch date: 21 September 2010, 04:03:30 UTC
- Rocket: Atlas V 501 s/n AV-025
- Launch site: Vandenberg, SLC-3E
- Contractor: United Launch Alliance (ULA)

Orbital parameters
- Reference system: Geocentric orbit
- Regime: Low Earth orbit (retrograde)
- Perigee altitude: 1,103 km (685 mi)
- Apogee altitude: 1,105 km (687 mi)
- Inclination: 122.99°
- Period: 107.35 minutes

USA-215, also known as NRO Launch 41 or NROL-41, is an American reconnaissance satellite, operated by the National Reconnaissance Office (NRO). Launched in 2010, it has been identified as the first in a new series of imaging radar satellites, developed as part of the Future Imagery Architecture (FIA) programme, to replace the earlier Lacrosse spacecraft.

== Launch ==
USA-215 was launched by an Atlas V launch vehicle, flying in the 501 configuration, operated by United Launch Alliance (ULA). The rocket was launched from Space Launch Complex 3E at Vandenberg Air Force Base at 04:03:30 UTC on 21 September 2010. It was identified as NRO Launch 41, and was the twenty-third flight of an Atlas V; the vehicle had the tail number AV-025, and was named Gladys.

== Mission ==
The satellite's orbit and mission are officially classified; however, it has been located by amateur observers in a retrograde low Earth orbit. As of 14 February 2021, it was in an orbit with a perigee of 1,103 km (685 mi), an apogee of 1,105 km (687 mi) and 122.99° of orbital inclination.
