= STS-36 =

1990 American crewed spaceflight for the Department of Defense

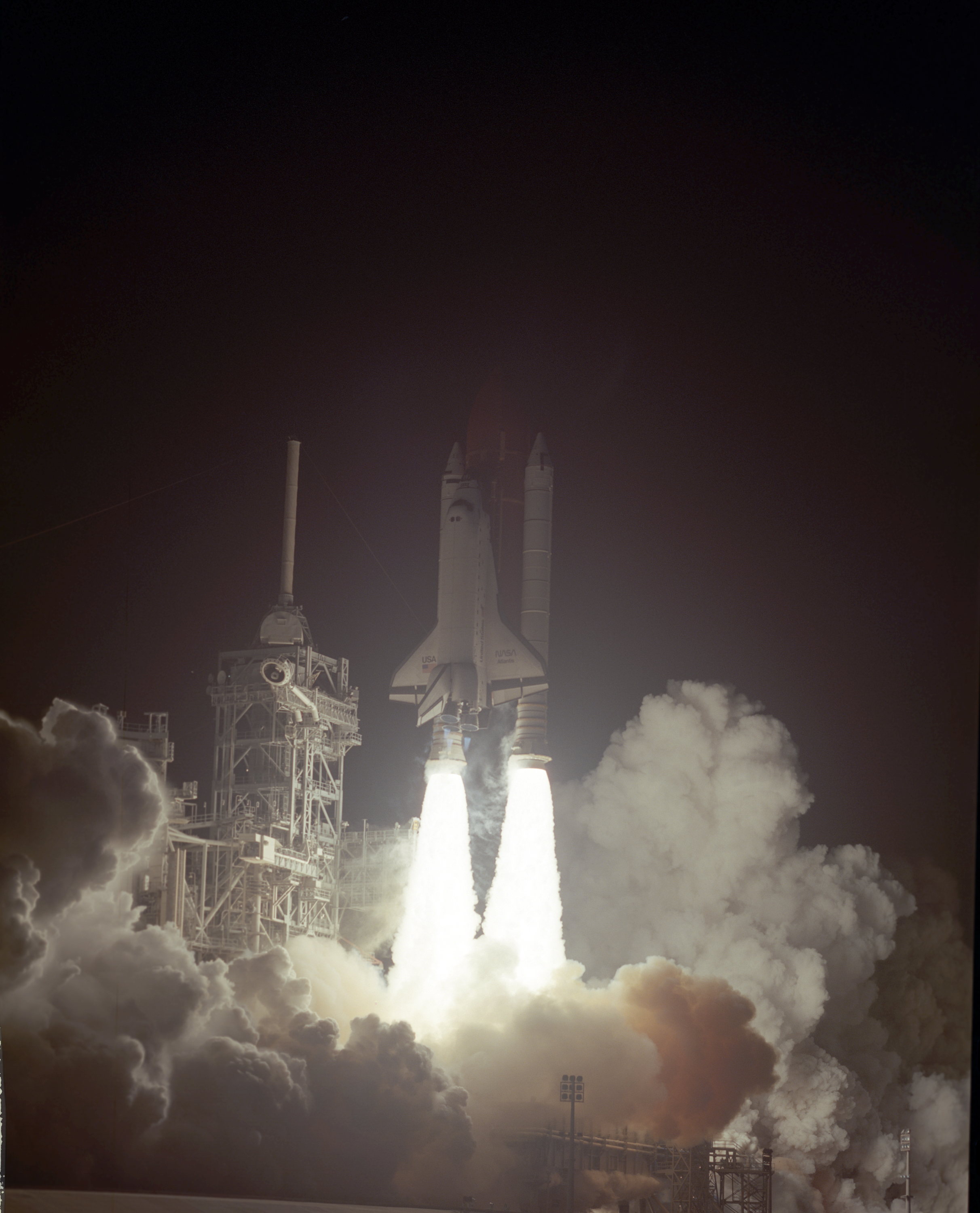
- Launch of Atlantis late at night on February 28
- Names: Space Transportation System-36; STS-36
- Mission type: DoD satellite deployment
- Operator: NASA
- COSPAR ID: 1990-019A
- SATCAT no.: 20512
- Mission duration: 4 days, 10 hours, 18 minutes, 22 seconds
- Distance travelled: 2,957,913 km (1,837,962 mi)
- Orbits completed: 72

Spacecraft properties
- Spacecraft: Space Shuttle Atlantis
- Launch mass: 2,044,469 kg (4,507,283 lb)
- Landing mass: 84,912 kg (187,199 lb)
- Payload mass: 19,600 kg (43,200 lb)

Crew
- Crew size: 5
- Members: John Oliver Creighton; John Casper; Pierre J. Thuot; David C. Hilmers; Mike Mullane

Start of mission
- Launch date: February 28, 1990, 07:50:22 UTC (2:50:22 am EST)
- Launch site: Kennedy, LC-39A
- Contractor: Rockwell International

End of mission
- Landing date: March 4, 1990, 18:08:44 UTC (10:08:44 am PST)
- Landing site: Edwards, Runway 23

Orbital parameters
- Reference system: Geocentric orbit
- Regime: Low Earth orbit
- Perigee altitude: 198 km (123 mi)
- Apogee altitude: 204 km (127 mi)
- Inclination: 62°
- Period: 88.5 minutes

Instruments
- In-flight Radiation Dose Distribution (IDRD)
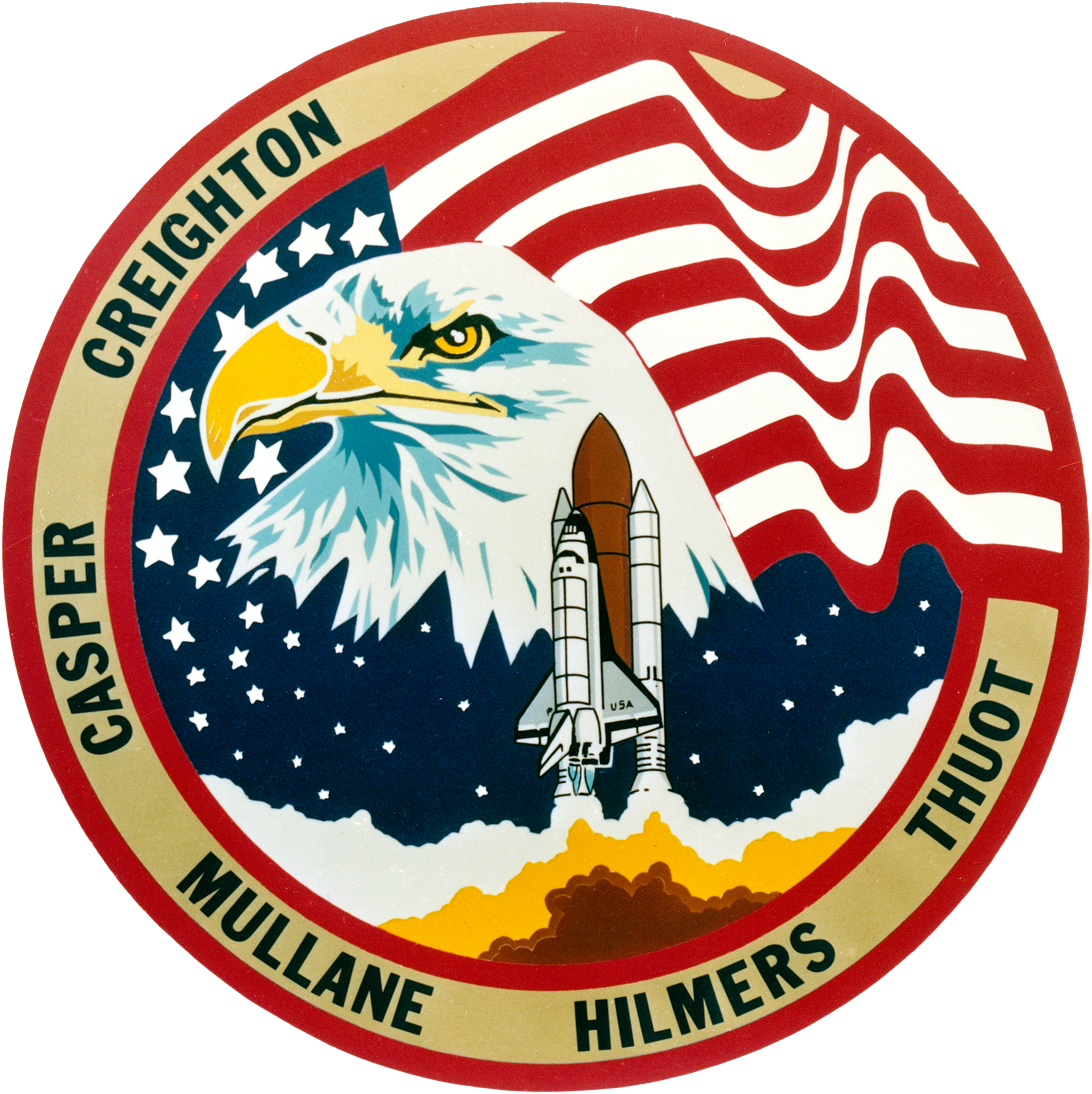
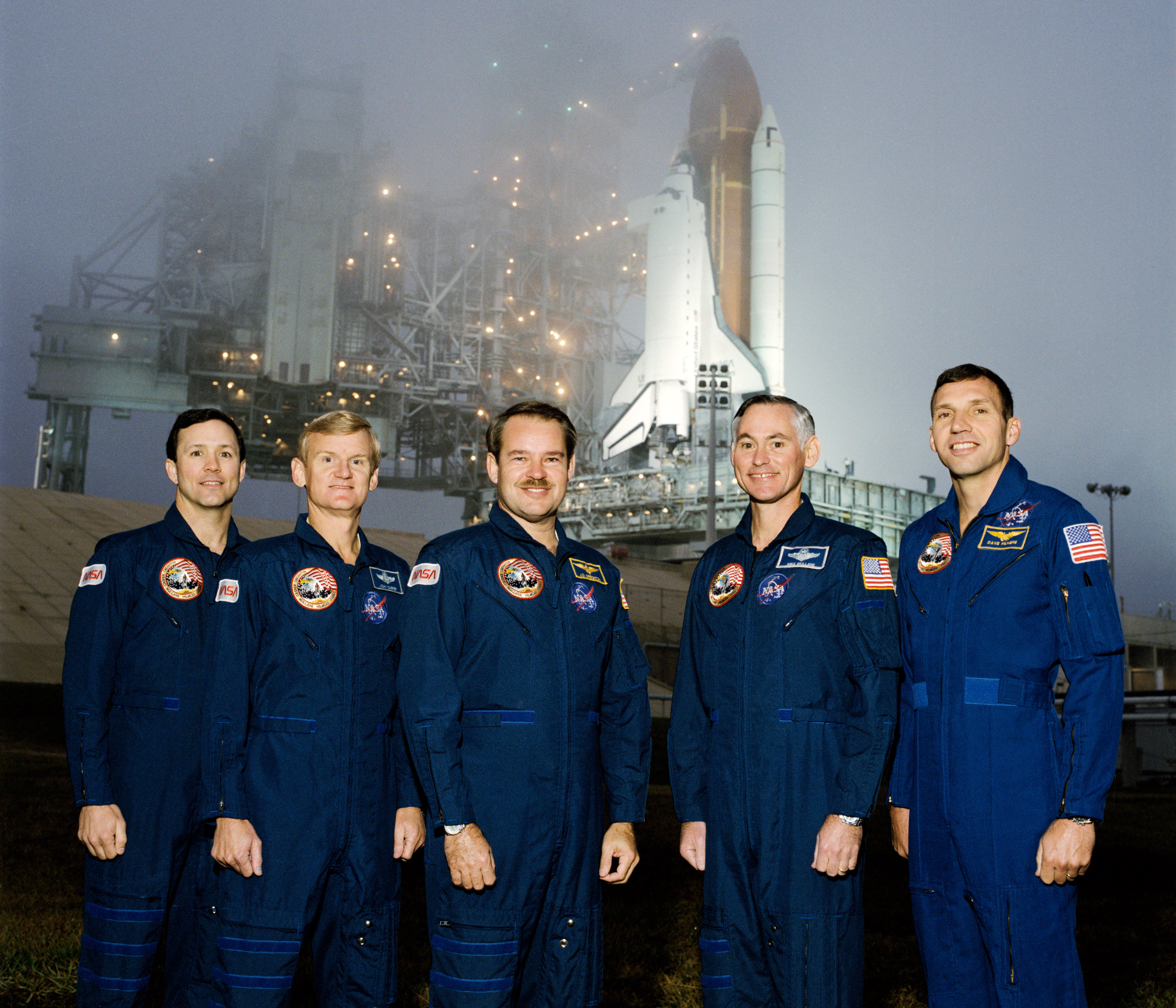
- STS-36 mission patch From left: Thuot, Casper, Creighton, Mullane and Hilmers Space Shuttle program

STS-36 was a NASA Space Shuttle mission, during which Space Shuttle Atlantis carried a classified payload for the U.S. Department of Defense (DoD) (believed to have been a Misty reconnaissance satellite) into orbit. STS-36 was the 34th shuttle mission overall, the sixth flight for Atlantis, and the fourth night launch of the shuttle program. It launched from Kennedy Space Center, Florida, on February 28, 1990, and landed on March 4, 1990.

== Crew ==
Position	Astronaut
Commander	John Oliver Creighton; Second spaceflight
Pilot	John Casper; First spaceflight
Mission Specialist 1	Pierre J. Thuot; First spaceflight
Mission Specialist 2 Flight Engineer	David C. Hilmers; Third spaceflight
Mission Specialist 3	Mike Mullane; Third and last spaceflight

=== Crew seat assignments ===
Seat	Launch	Landing	Seats 1–4 are on the flight deck. Seats 5–7 are on the mid-deck.
1	Creighton		Seats 1–4 are on the flight deck. Seats 5–7 are on the mid-deck.
2	Casper		Seats 1–4 are on the flight deck. Seats 5–7 are on the mid-deck.
3	Thuot	Mullane	Seats 1–4 are on the flight deck. Seats 5–7 are on the mid-deck.
4	Hilmers		Seats 1–4 are on the flight deck. Seats 5–7 are on the mid-deck.
5	Mullane	Thuot	Seats 1–4 are on the flight deck. Seats 5–7 are on the mid-deck.
6	Unused		Seats 1–4 are on the flight deck. Seats 5–7 are on the mid-deck.
7	Unused		Seats 1–4 are on the flight deck. Seats 5–7 are on the mid-deck.

== Mission summary ==
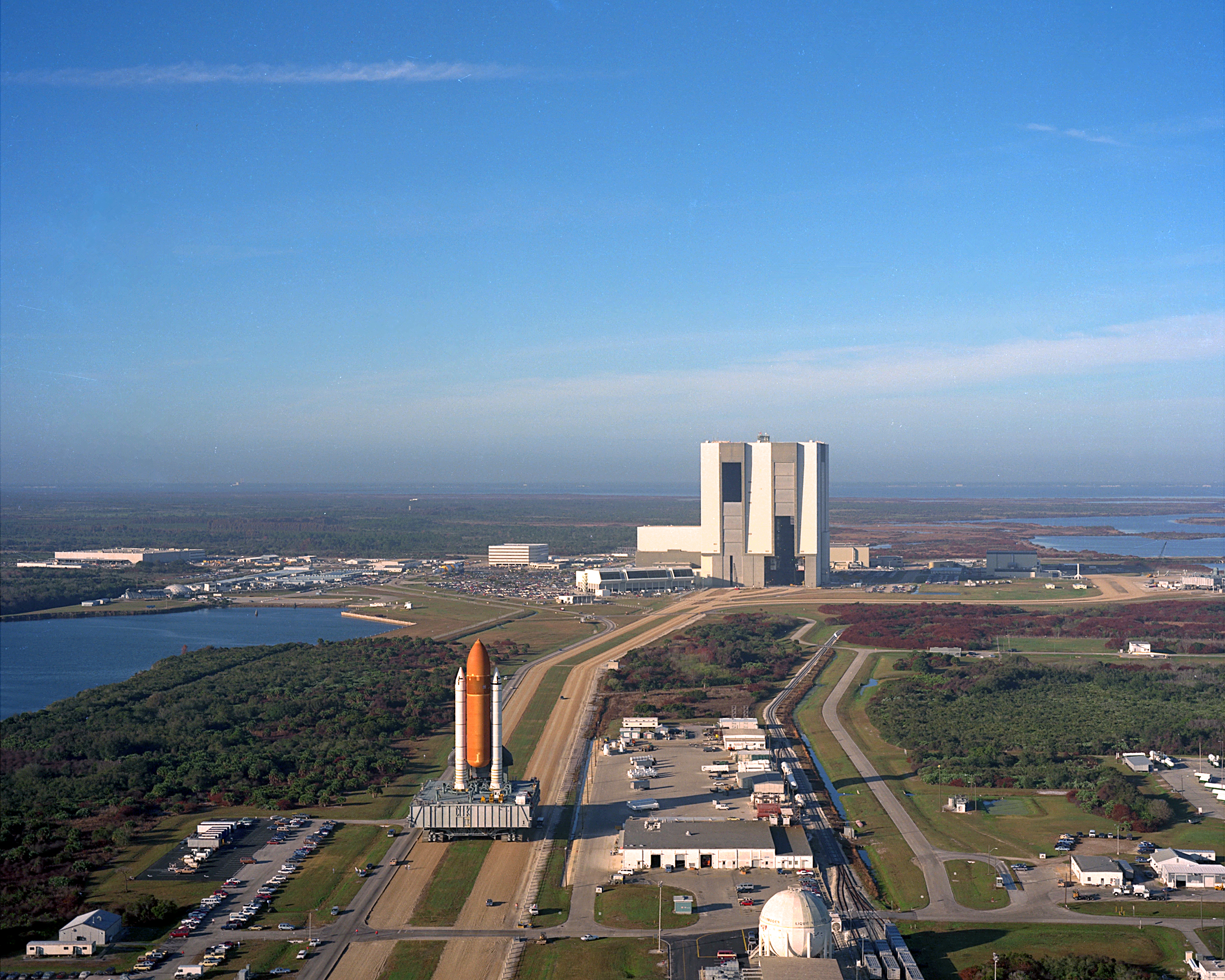
Space Shuttle Atlantis is prepared for launch on January 25, 1990.

Attempt	Planned	Result	Turnaround	Reason	Decision point	Weather go (%)	Notes
1	22 Feb 1990, 1:15:00 am	Scrubbed	—	Medical	21 Feb 1990, 12:00 am	50	Commander Creighton was experiencing a minor respiratory infection. Due to the secretive nature of the mission, NASA did not give the exact launch time until nine minutes before liftoff. A NASA magazine reported the launch time as 1:15 AM.
2	23 Feb 1990, 12:00:00 am	Scrubbed	0 days 22 hours 45 minutes	Weather		20	The weather conditions were unacceptable for launch. In addition, Commander Creighton was still unwell.
3	24 Feb 1990, 12:00:00 am	Scrubbed	1 day 0 hours 0 minutes	Weather			Creighton had recovered at this time, however, a storm front had moved into the KSC area.
4	25 Feb 1990, 12:55:00 am	Scrubbed	1 day 0 hours 55 minutes	Technical	25 Feb 1990, 1:05 am (T−00:00:31)	80	A range safety backup computer malfunctioned at T−00:01:55. The countdown clock was held at T−31 seconds to assess the situation, however, the Liquid Oxygen temperature inside the main engines exceeded launch commit criteria. A general purpose computer also malfunctioned.
5	26 Feb 1990, 12:54:00 am	Scrubbed	0 days 23 hours 59 minutes	Weather	26 Feb 1990, 2:32 am (T−00:09:00 hold)	40	Clouds were present at the Shuttle Landing Facility. A 48-hour turnaround was issued to allow the crew to rest.
6	28 Feb 1990, 2:50:22 am	Success	2 days 1 hour 56 minutes			40–60	Countdown was held at T−5 minutes to assess RTLS and TAL weather.

Atlantis launched on the STS-36 mission on February 28, 1990, at 07:50:22 UTC (2:50:22 am EST, local time at the launch site). The launch was originally set for February 22, 1990, but was postponed repeatedly due to the illness of the crew commander and poor weather conditions. This was the first time since Apollo 13 in 1970 that a crewed space mission was affected by the illness of a crew member. The first rescheduled launch attempt, set for February 25, 1990, was scrubbed at T−31 seconds due to a range safety computer malfunction. Another attempt, set for February 26, 1990, was scrubbed during the T−9 minute hold due to weather conditions. The successful launch on February 28, 1990, was set for a classified launch window, lying within a launch period extending from 00:00 to 04:00 EST. The launch weight for this mission was classified.

The launch trajectory was unique to this flight and allowed the mission to reach an orbital inclination of 62°, the deployment orbit of its payload — the normal maximum inclination for a shuttle flight was 57°. This so-called "dog-leg" trajectory saw Atlantis fly downrange on a normal launch azimuth and then maneuver to a higher launch azimuth once out over the water. Although the maneuver resulted in a reduction of vehicle performance, it was the only way to reach the required deployment orbit from Kennedy Space Center (originally, the flight had been slated to launch from Vandenberg Air Force Base in California, until the shuttle launch program there was cancelled). Due to the payload's importance to national defense, the normal Range Safety rules were waived, allowing the shuttle to fly over or near Cape Hatteras, Cape Cod, and parts of Canada.

As a Department of Defense operation, STS-36's payload remains officially classified and not many photos from it were released. STS-36 launched a single satellite, also described as AFP-731. Other objects (1990-019C-G) reportedly appeared in orbit following its deployment.

It was reported that USA-53 was an Advanced KH-11 photo-reconnaissance satellite, using an all-digital imaging system to return pictures. KH-11 satellites are believed to resemble the Hubble Space Telescope in size and shape, as the satellites were shipped in similar containers and had comparable primary mirror diameters. USA-53, nicknamed "Misty", was tracked briefly by amateur satellite observers in October and November 1990.

The mission marked another flight of an 5 kg (11 lb) human skull, which served as the primary element of "Detailed Secondary Objective 469", also known as the "In-flight Radiation Dose Distribution Experiment" (IDRD). This joint NASA/DoD experiment was designed to examine the penetration of radiation into the human cranium during spaceflight. The female skull was seated in a plastic matrix, representative of tissue, and sliced into ten layers. Hundreds of thermo-luminescent dosimeters were mounted in the skull's layers to record radiation levels at multiple depths. This experiment, which also flew on STS-28 and STS-31, was located in the shuttle's mid-deck lockers on all three flights, recording radiation levels at different orbital inclinations.

Atlantis landed at 18:08:44 UTC (10:08:44 am PST, local time at the landing site) on March 4, 1990, at Edwards Air Force Base, California, on dry lakebed runway 23 ending the STS-36. This was the final mission to end on runway 23, which was first used for the landing of the first space shuttle mission, STS-1. The orbiter's rollout distance was 2.41 km (1.50 mi; 1.30 nmi). Atlantis was towed to the Mate-Demate Device by around 15:00 PST.

About 62 impacts in the shuttle's Thermal Protection System (TPS) tiles were counted by the debris team after the mission. Tile engineers reported that only one tile required replacement. The brakes and tires performed nominally. Drops of hydraulic fluid were observed in the right main landing gear wheel well, the liquid hydrogen 43 cm (17 in) disconnect cavity and possibly around two of the main engines.

== Mission insignia ==
The thirty-six stars on the insignia symbolize the flight's numerical designation in the Space Transportation System's mission sequence; the stars also form part of a stylized American flag, forming the background to an image of a bald eagle, the American national bird.

== See also ==
- List of human spaceflights
- List of Space Shuttle missions
- Militarization of space
