= USA-247 =

American reconnaissance satellite

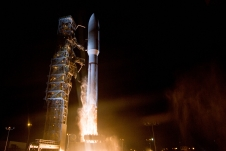
- Mission type: Radar imaging
- Operator: US NRO
- COSPAR ID: 2013-072A
- SATCAT no.: 39462

Spacecraft properties
- Spacecraft type: Topaz
- Manufacturer: Boeing

Start of mission
- Launch date: 6 December 2013, 07:14:30 UTC
- Rocket: Atlas V 501 AV-042
- Launch site: Vandenberg SLC-3E
- Contractor: ULA

Orbital parameters
- Reference system: Geocentric
- Regime: Low Earth (retrograde)
- Perigee altitude: 1,108 kilometers (688 mi)
- Apogee altitude: 1,113 kilometers (692 mi)
- Inclination: 123.01 degrees
- Period: 107.35 minutes
- Epoch: 22 January 2015, 18:27:48 UTC

USA-247, also known as NRO Launch 39 or NROL-39, is an American reconnaissance satellite, operated by the National Reconnaissance Office and launched in December 2013. The USA-247 launch received a relatively high level of press coverage due to the mission's choice of logo, which depicts an octopus sitting astride the globe with the motto "Nothing Is Beyond Our Reach". The logo was extensively criticized in light of the surveillance disclosures in July 2013.

== Launch details ==
The satellite has been identified as a radar imaging satellite, developed as part of the Future Imagery Architecture program, to replace the earlier Onyx spacecraft.

USA-247 was launched by United Launch Alliance using an Atlas V carrier rocket flying in the 501 configuration, along with twelve CubeSats being carried as secondary payloads. Five of the CubeSats were a part of NASA ELaNa II manifest. Space Launch Complex 3E at the Vandenberg Air Force Base was used to conduct the launch, which took place at 07:14:30 UTC on 6 December 2013 (23:14 local time on 5 December). Identified as NRO Launch 39, it marked the forty-third flight of an Atlas V. The rocket used had been named Belle, and had tail number AV-042.

== Mission logo ==
The mission's official logo was a gigantic octopus with its massive arms wrapped around the world, accompanied by the motto "Nothing Is Beyond Our Reach". This image was widely deemed controversial in light of the Snowden disclosures.

A spokesperson for the NRO explained:

NROL-39 is represented by the octopus, a versatile, adaptable, and highly intelligent creature. Emblematically, enemies of the United States can be reached no matter where they choose to hide. 'Nothing is beyond our reach' defines this mission and the value it brings to our nation and the warfighters it supports, who serve valiantly all over the globe, protecting our nation.

After the Director of National Intelligence announced the launch on Twitter, the image was criticized as "tone-deaf" to the political climate caused by the 2013 surveillance disclosures.

In a segment discussing mass surveillance entitled "That Thing They Said They're Not Doing? They're Totally Doing", American political commentator Jon Stewart commented on the logo:

I feel like, at this point, our intelligence community is pretty much even owning the fact that they are getting nefarious.
Last week, the National Reconnaissance Office launched this spy satellite into orbit;
And the logo they chose for their spy rocket—this is real—a giant octopus sucking the face off North America.

The ODNI gave a more mundane explanation for the patch design in an internal magazine, stating that it originated from an engineering in-joke regarding a piece of cabling called an "octopus harness" that caused problems during testing for the satellite, leading the engineering team to joke that "the octopus harness had taken over the world."
