= 2012 National Reconnaissance Office space telescope donation to NASA =

Declassification and donation to NASA of two identical space telescopes

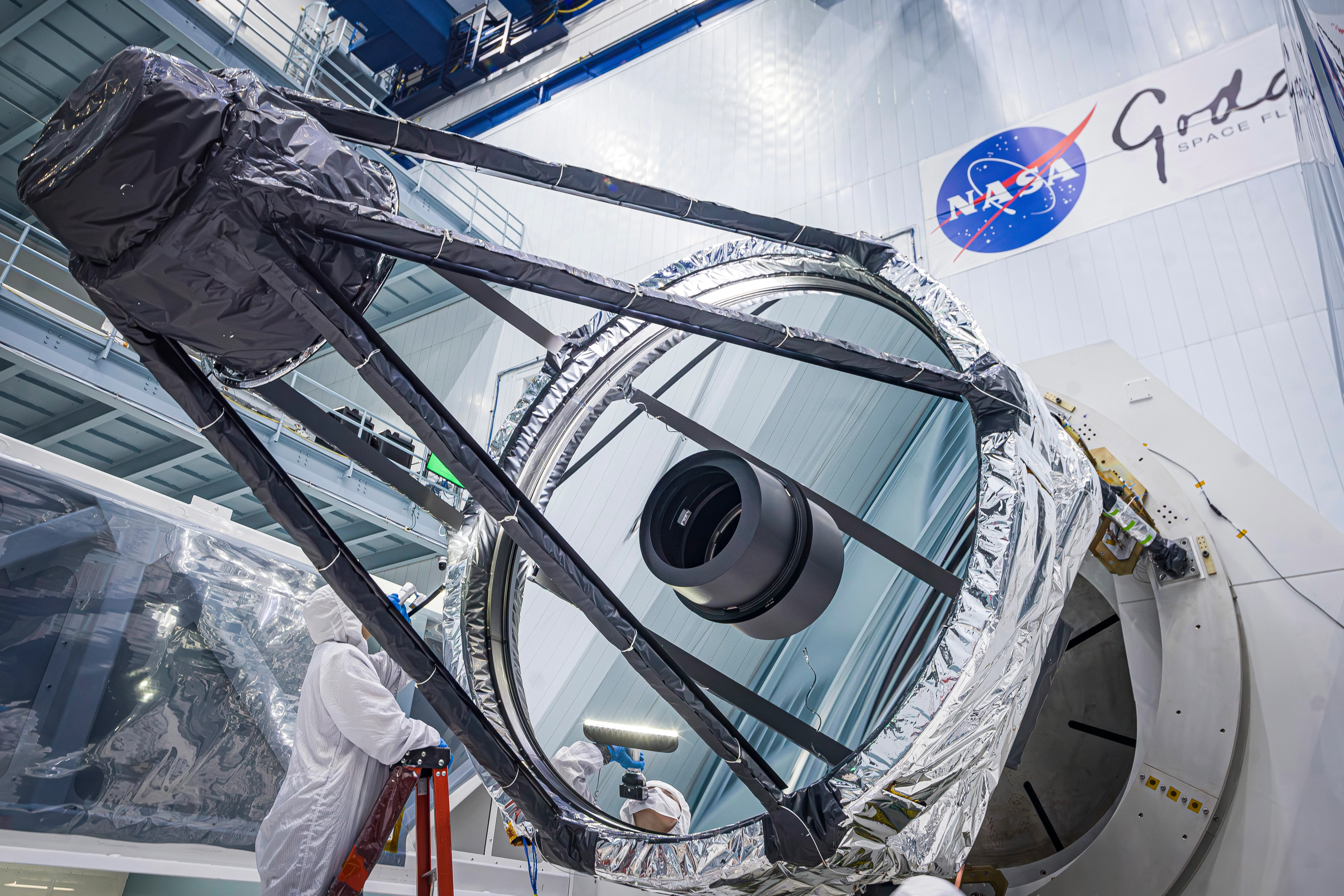
The primary mirror of the Nancy Grace Roman Space Telescope was donated to NASA by the NRO in 2012.

In 2012, the United States National Reconnaissance Office (NRO) donated two optical imaging systems to NASA for potential use in space telescope missions. The systems had been developed for the canceled Future Imagery Architecture reconnaissance satellite program, which was terminated following cost overruns and delays. The donated optics were reported to have capabilities comparable to those of the Hubble Space Telescope, although NASA would need to develop and fund the instruments, spacecraft, and launch systems required to use them.

On February 17, 2016, NASA formally designated the Nancy Grace Roman Space Telescope as a mission incorporating one of the donated optical systems. Roman launched on August 30, 2026. Using the donated optics, Roman can produce images with resolution comparable to Hubble while having a substantially larger field of view, allowing it to survey the sky up to 1,000 times faster.

== Background ==
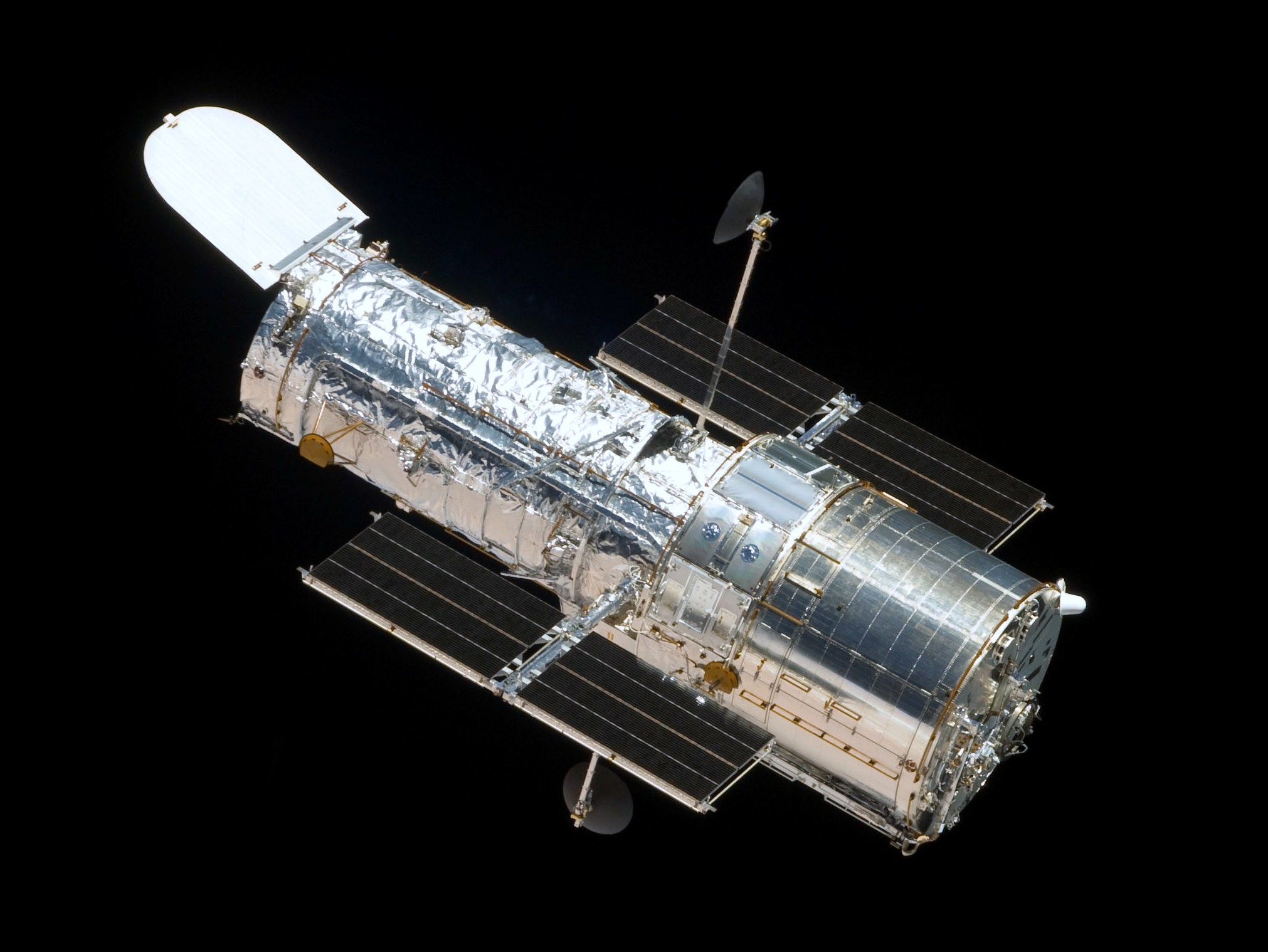
The Hubble Space Telescope launched in 1990.

While the Hubble Space Telescope of the National Aeronautics and Space Administration (NASA) has collected a large amount of astronomical data, has outlived all expectations, and has been described as one of the space agency's most successful missions, the facility will eventually succumb to the extreme environment of space. In addition, with the James Webb Space Telescope costing at least US$9 billion, the agency's astrophysics budget is strained. As a result, NASA's other astrophysics missions have been delayed until funding becomes available.

In January 2011 the National Reconnaissance Office (NRO) revealed to NASA the existence of two unneeded telescope optical systems, originally built to be used in reconnaissance satellites, and available to the civilian agency. NASA accepted the offer in August 2011 and announced the donation on June 4, 2012. The instruments were constructed between the late 1990s and early 2000s, reportedly for NRO's unsuccessful Future Imagery Architecture program; in addition to the two completed telescopes, a primary mirror and other parts for a third also exist.

While NRO considers them to be obsolete, the telescopes are nevertheless new and unused. All charge-coupled devices (CCDs) and electronics have been removed, however, and NASA must add them at its own expense. When the telescopes' specifications were presented to scientists, large portions were censored due to national security. An unnamed space analyst stated that the instruments may be a part of the KH-11 Kennen line of satellites which have been launched since 1976, but which have now been largely superseded by newer telescopes with wider fields of view. The analyst stated, however, that the telescopes have "state-of-the-art optics" despite their obsolescence for reconnaissance purposes.

== Nancy Grace Roman Space Telescope ==
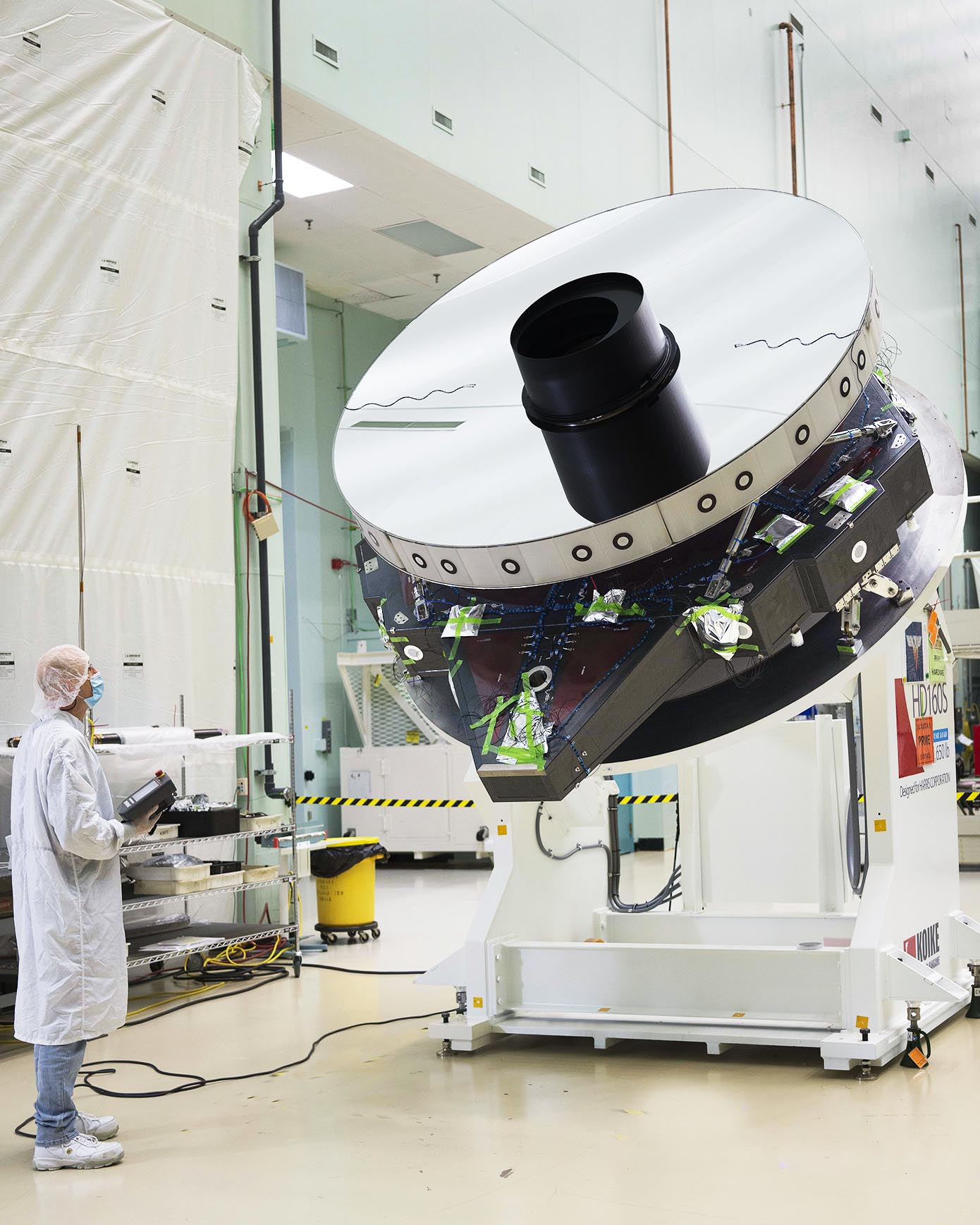
The primary mirror of the Nancy Grace Roman telescope

The early consensus for the usage of the telescopes was to follow the NASA Astronomy and Astrophysics Decadal Survey of 2010, which lists the Wide Field Infrared Survey Telescope (now renamed the Nancy Grace Roman Space Telescope) as its highest priority. Observing in the infrared section of the electromagnetic spectrum, the Nancy Grace Roman Space Telescope will be used to study the role of dark energy in the Universe, as well as to directly image Jupiter-sized extrasolar planets.

The NRO telescope design has several features which make it useful for Roman/WFIRST and superior to the Hubble. The NRO instrument's 2.4-meter (94 in) primary mirror is the same size and quality as the Hubble's. With double the mirror diameter of the original WFIRST design, it allows for up to twice the image resolution and gathers four times the light. Unlike civilian telescopes, the NRO instrument also has a steerable secondary mirror for additional precision. The telescope has a much wider field of view than Hubble due to its shorter focal length, allowing it to observe about 100 times the area at any given time as Hubble can. This has led to the donated telescopes' characterization as "Stubby Hubbles". Their obstructed design, however, may make imaging extrasolar planets more challenging, and would be unsuitable for imaging the most distant galaxies at its longest infrared wavelengths, which requires cooling beyond the original NRO design temperature range.

Whether using the NRO telescopes would save NASA money is unclear. While each is worth at least $250 million, their larger size compared to the proposed WFIRST design would require a larger rocket and camera. According to one NASA estimate using an NRO telescope would raise the cost of WFIRST by $250 million above its $1.5 billion budget. Another estimate states that NASA would save up to $250 million. The agency's deputy acting director for astrophysics Michael Moore states that using both telescopes may ultimately save NASA $1.5 billion. David Spergel estimated that using an NRO telescope would add about $100 million to WFIRST's cost, but would prefer to spend another $200 million for a coronagraph to improve its direct-imaging capability.

The construction of the Nancy Grace Roman Space Telescope was completed in November 2025. It was launched to a Sun–Earth L_{2} orbit on August 30, 2026.

== Proposed plans for the second telescope ==
While the first telescope is now in use as the basis for Roman/WFIRST, NASA currently does not have plans or funding for the usage of the second. Astronomers had studied possible additional uses, and NASA considered dozens of proposals; the only prohibition is Earth observation, a condition of the NRO donation. Possibilities include observing Earth's aurora and ionosphere, or asteroids and other faint objects within the Solar System. NASA has also suggested that the telescope could be sent to Mars, photographing the surface with a resolution about four times finer than the current Mars Reconnaissance Orbiter's HiRISE instrument. From Martian orbit the telescope could also view the outer Solar System and the asteroid belt.

In 2026, John M. Grunsfeld, the deputy director of the Space Telescope Science Institute at the time of the donation, stated the NRO asked NASA to return the second telescope, and NASA complied. NASA leadership still maintains plans for the telescope. The NRO did not provide the location of the telescope.

== See also ==
- Multiple Mirror Telescope – An astronomical telescope in Arizona, built with donated NRO mirrors
