= USA-234 =

American reconnaissance satellite

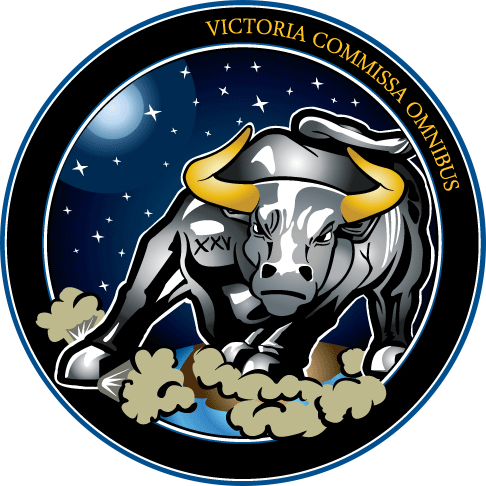
- NROL-25 Mission Patch
- Mission type: Radar imaging
- Operator: US NRO
- COSPAR ID: 2012-014A
- SATCAT no.: 38109

Spacecraft properties
- Spacecraft type: Topaz
- Manufacturer: Lockheed Martin

Start of mission
- Launch date: 3 April 2012, 23:12:57 UTC
- Rocket: Delta IV-M+(5,2) D359
- Launch site: Vandenberg SLC-6
- Contractor: ULA

Orbital parameters
- Reference system: Geocentric
- Regime: Low Earth (retrograde)
- Perigee altitude: 1,107 kilometres (688 mi)
- Apogee altitude: 1,114 kilometres (692 mi)
- Inclination: 123.00 degrees
- Period: 107.35 minutes
- Epoch: 18 January 2015, 16:58:55 UTC

USA-234, also known as NRO Launch 25 or NROL-25, is an American reconnaissance satellite, operated by the National Reconnaissance Office. Launched from Vandenberg Air Force Base in 2012, it has been identified as the second radar imaging satellite to be launched as part of the Future Imagery Architecture programme.

USA-234 was launched by United Launch Alliance, using a Delta IV carrier rocket, making its first flight in the Medium+(5,2) configuration. The rocket was launched from Space Launch Complex 6 at Vandenberg, at 23:12:57 UTC (16:12:57 PDT) on 3 April 2012. It was identified as NRO Launch 25, and was the nineteenth flight of a Delta IV; the vehicle was designated Delta 359, and named Electra.

The satellite's orbit and mission are officially classified; however, it has been located by amateur observers in a 1,096 by 1,079 kilometres (681 by 670 mi) orbit, inclined at 123 degrees.
