= Zirconic =

US spy satellite program

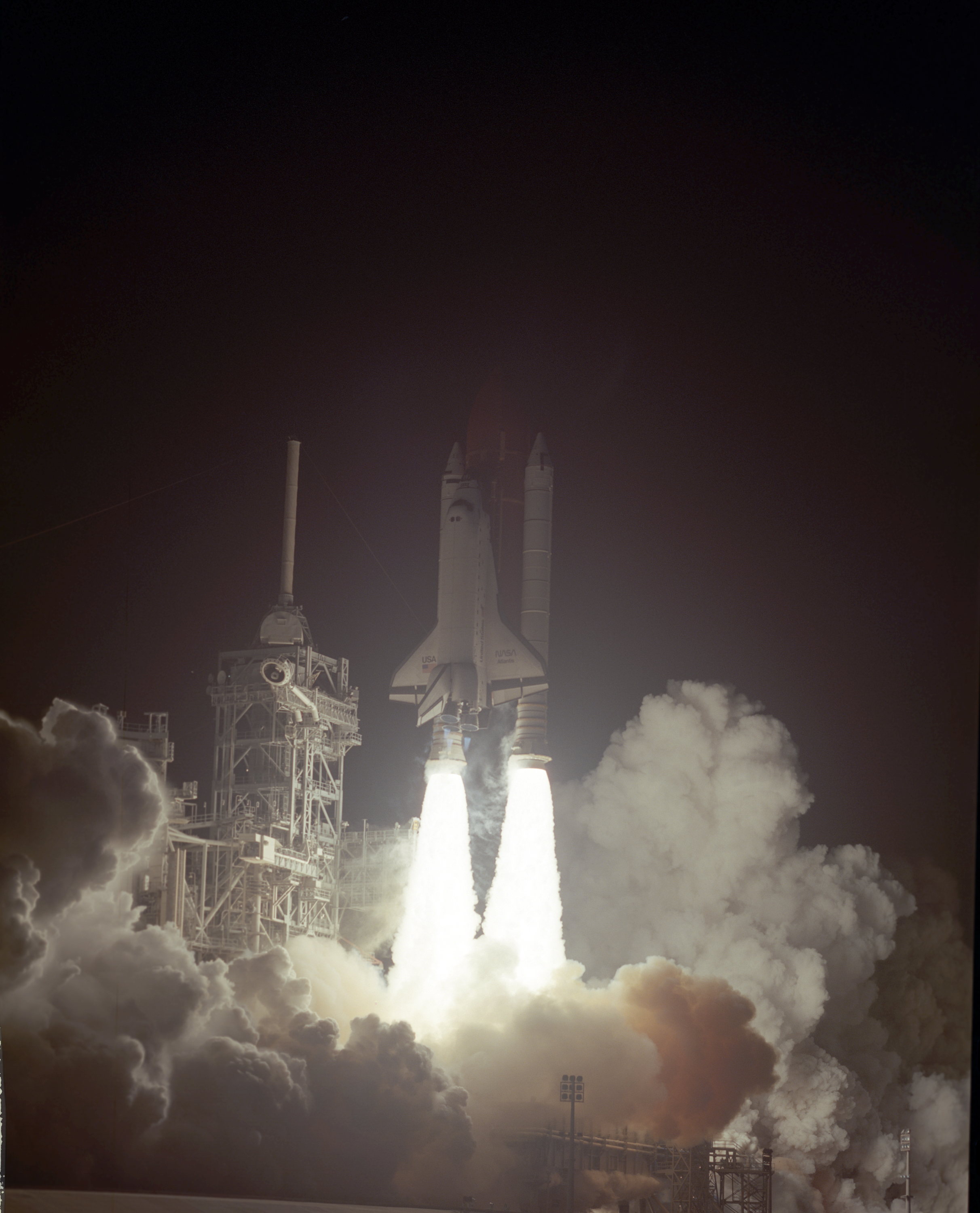
STS-36 launch for Space Shuttle Atlantis, which deployed assets from the Misty satellite program under Zirconic

Zirconic was a National Reconnaissance Office (NRO) codename for a program established under the Presidency of Ronald Reagan to develop reconnaissance satellites equipped with stealth technology. Zirconic operated as a sensitive compartmented information program and included the Misty spacecraft, designed to reduce radar, visible, infrared, and laser signatures. Access to related classified material required a dedicated "Zirconic clearance", and the program's development effort was internally codenamed Nebula.

Misty deployments began in 1990, when Misty 1 launched aboard the Space Shuttle Atlantis and was deployed over the side rather than through a conventional payload bay ejection; amateur observers nevertheless tracked it within months. Misty 2 followed in 1999 on a Titan IV-B rocket, during which observers noted the release of a high-altitude decoy intended to obscure the true payload's orbit.

By the early 2000s, Zirconic had become one of the largest single line items in the U.S. intelligence budget, with Misty's development costs rising from US$5 billion to more than US$9 billion by 2004. The program drew scrutiny from the numerous United States Congress committees over the effectiveness of the program. Critics argued that extreme secrecy enabled unchecked spending and limited transparency. Supporters maintained that stealth capability provided unique intelligence advantages in situations where adversaries believed no satellites were overhead.

== Background ==
Early in the Cold War, the United States (U.S.) attempted to monitor the Soviet Union's nuclear arsenal build-up. Particular concerns were the production numbers, deployment site locations, and missile capabilities. Initially, the U.S. used U-2 spy planes taking pictures on the ground for later analysis. However, the Soviets developed countermeasures and on May 1, 1960, a U-2 plane was shot down by a surface-to-air missile with its pilot, Francis Gary Powers, being captured. The U-2 incident ended the flights over the Soviet Union.

Around the same time, the U.S. was developing a satellite program, named CORONA, that eventually replaced the U-2 program and extended the list of targeted countries, such as China and Cuba. The first test took place on February 28, 1959, in Vandenberg Air Force Base, California. After several attempts, on August 18, 1960, the first successful satellite overflew the Soviet Union seven times and the satellite's film-return capsule was ejected and picked up near Hawaii. The CORONA satellites were replaced by the improved KH-8 Gambit 3 satellites, which operated from 1963 until 1984. The NRO considered stealth reconnaissance satellites as early as 1963; at the time, this was based on the assumption of continuing data collection efforts even if challenged by "an intense Soviet effort" to limit orbital photography coverage of their assets.

Meanwhile, the Soviet Union was developing anti-satellite weapons without public announcement. The first anti-satellite technologies were developed during the cold war, with the Soviet Istrebitel Sputnikov programme and the American SAINT. A 1983 Department of Defense report noted that Soviet anti-satellite systems were operational and capable of targeting U.S. spacecraft in low Earth orbit, reinforcing the rationale for a stealth imaging platform. Known types of anti-satellite weapons include high-altitude nuclear weapons and various aircraft, naval, and surface-launched missiles. On May 29, 1985, Colonel General Nikolai Chervov of the Soviet General Staff stated in an interview with a West German reporter that the Soviet Union had developed a direct ascent satellite interceptor aircraft. In 1994, Teledyne Industries received a patent for a "satellite signature suppression shield" designed to reduce a spacecraft's laser, radar, visible, and infrared signatures.

== Program history ==
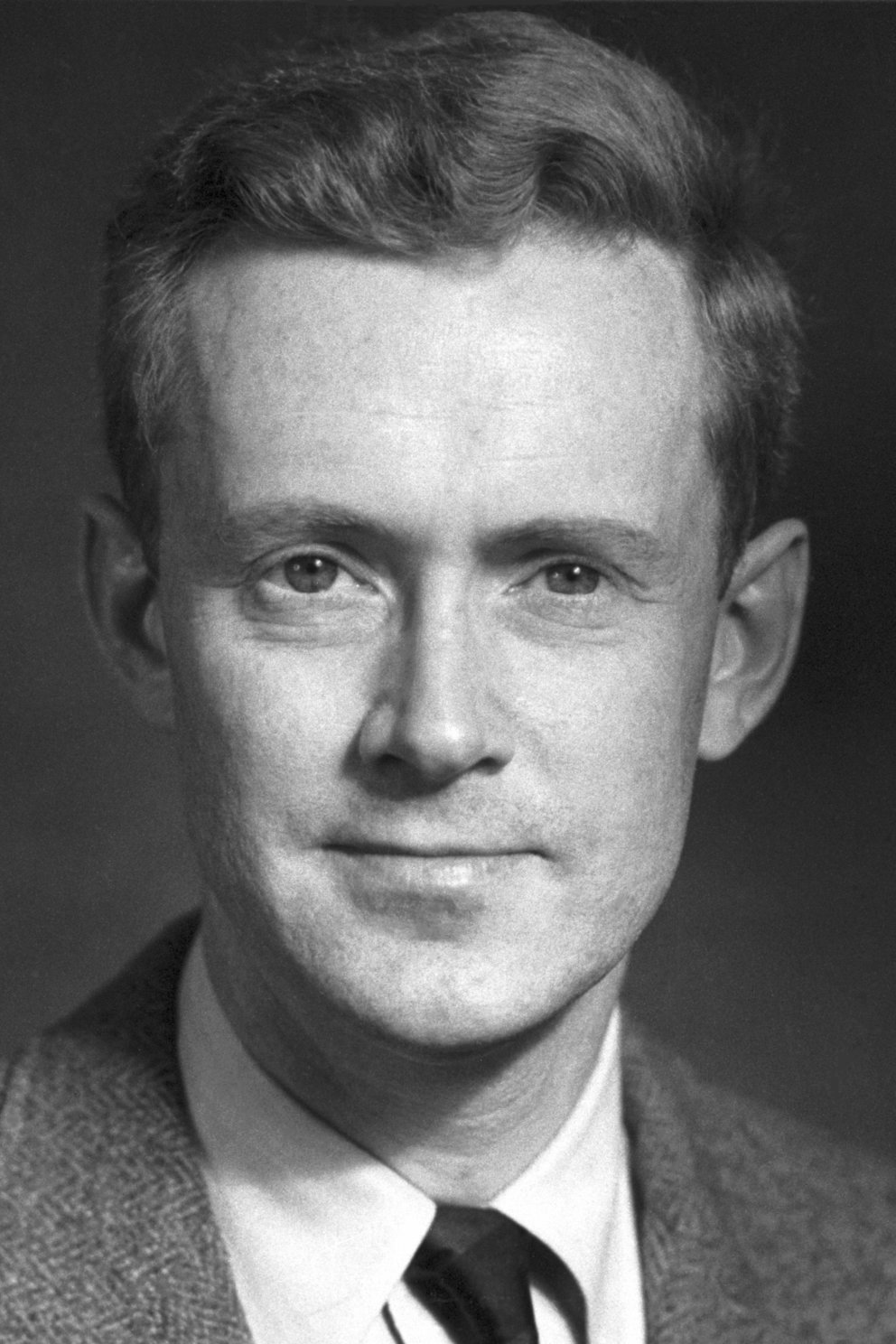
Edward Mills Purcell was recognized by the National Reconnaissance Office for his work related to satellite stealth technology.

The Zirconic compartment was established under the Ronald Reagan administration within the Byeman Control System. The development effort was internally codenamed Nebula, and access to the related information was restricted to individuals granted "Zirconic clearance". Writing for European Security & Defence, Douglas Richardson noted the involvement of Edward Mills Purcell in Zirconic and earlier Corona programs "to make these vehicles, if not invisible to radar, hard to observe with radar." Analysts also observed that the Space-Based Infrared System, the Advanced Extremely High Frequency communications network, and the optical and radar components of the Future Imagery Architecture experienced comparable cost growth during the same period. According to The Washington Post, Lockheed Martin served as a lead contractor on Zirconic.

Jeffrey T. Richelson first disclosed the Zirconic program in his 2002 book, The Wizards of Langley: Inside the CIA's Directorate of Science and Technology. The program entered wider public awareness in December 2004, when The Washington Post and The New York Times reported on it. In late 2004, the Senate Intelligence Committee voted to terminate Zirconic, but the program continued due to the support of the House Intelligence Committee and both the House Appropriations Committee and Senate Appropriations Committee. On June 21, 2007, the Associated Press reported that Director of National Intelligence John Michael McConnell had cancelled the Misty program. A spokesperson for McConnell confirmed that McConnell has the authority to cancel projects, but declined to comment further.

== Satellite details ==
=== Designs ===
A 1971 patent filed by employees of TRW Inc. (later acquired by Northrop Grumman) proposed a satellite design that could mask its radar cross-section, making it appear to remote sensors as a benign spacecraft. The patent described a crossed-skirt antiradar screen structure capable of either suppressing a satellite's radar cross-section or imitating the signature of a benign spacecraft. Two decades later, staff of the Strategic Defense Initiative (SDI)—later reorganized as the Missile Defense Agency—filed a similar patent. The 1990 public patent for a satellite signature suppression shield prompted internal concern within the NRO over potential exposure of classified methods.

The Misty satellite was designed to take photographs during daylight hours and in clear weather. However, it lacked the capability to capture imagery in all-weather conditions. An early proposal to maintain a satellite in a high parking orbit and deorbit it only when needed was abandoned after it was determined that film would degrade while in storage. The camouflage space shield described in the SDI patent took the form of an inflatable balloon that could be rapidly deployed and then hardened through exposure to both external and internally generated ultraviolet radiation.

=== Launches ===
The first satellite launched for the program was deployed on March 1, 1990, by the Space Shuttle Atlantis as part of Mission STS-36. Objects associated with the satellite decayed on March 31, 1990, but the satellite was seen and tracked later that year and in the mid-1990s by amateur observers. The second satellite was launched on May 22, 1999. By 2004 the launch of a third satellite was planned for 2009. Circumstantial evidence suggested that the third satellite might be the payload of the Delta IV Heavy launch designated NROL-15, which was launched in June 2012.

Name	COSPAR ID SATCAT No.	Launch date (UTC)	Launch vehicle	Launch site	Launch designation	Orbit	Remarks	Mission patch
USA-53	1990-019B; Alternate names: 20516, AFP-731, KH11-10, USA 53	28 February 1990; 07:50	Space Shuttle Atlantis	KSC LC-39A	STS-36	811 km × 811 km, i=65°	KH-11 KENNEN	
USA-144	1999-028A; Alternate names: 25744, KH12-4, USA 144	22 May 1999; 09:36	Titan IV(404)B	VAFB SLC-4E	NROL-9	None available	Enhanced Imaging System	

=== Misty ===
Because of extreme compartmentalization, Misty's developers did not consult key satellite-tracking experts at agencies such as the Naval Research Laboratory, potentially overlooking alternative assessments. The Misty program was managed under the CIA's Directorate of Science and Technology, specifically its Office of Development and Engineering. Analysts noted that stealth satellites were less versatile than standard reconnaissance assets and useful only in rare circumstances when adversaries believed no satellites were overhead.

The Misty satellite launched from the Space Shuttle Atlantis in 1990 was deployed "over the side" rather than through the standard payload bay ejection. Following the 1999 Titan IV-B launch of Misty 2, amateur satellite trackers concluded that the spacecraft released a high-altitude decoy object. The decoy was intended to obscure the true payload, which operated in a much lower orbit. Despite Misty 2 being operational, U.S. overhead assets failed to detect North Korean uranium enrichment activities; the discovery was instead made by tracking aluminum tube shipments. After the 1990 launch, both U.S. and Soviet sources incorrectly reported that Misty had malfunctioned and would soon reenter the atmosphere. The CIA later confirmed that the satellite remained operational. In its early use, the KH-11 satellite was mistakenly identified by Soviet analysts as a signals intelligence platform. As a result, they reduced their concealment efforts during the satellite's overpasses.

A formal threat assessment by the CIA's Office of Scientific and Weapons Research concluded that Soviet tracking systems were unlikely to detect Misty. Despite any intended stealth, an object was tracked by amateur observers within eight months of the Misty 2 launch at an altitude of approximately 500 mi (800 km). According to Richelson, the object's association with the launch date made it "highly likely" the observers had found Misty 2. Misty remained in orbit as late as May 1995, though its location and further intelligence contributions thereafter remained unknown.

Wired reported that amateur observers of satellites whose orbits are not disclosed, often called "black satellites", tracked classified payloads by making optical observations, often with binoculars and a stopwatch, and coordinating internationally to derive and refine orbital elements. Once they spotted the satellite, they noticed it was unusually bright. This has led to the hypothesis these stealth satellites reduce their signature by redirecting sunlight. This could make them imperceptible from a specific location on Earth at times; however, they may remain visible from any other location beyond their target. Afterward, with their discovered orbits, they could be timed and observed. Wired noted this occurred with satellites in 1998, which contributed to India keeping some nuclear tests secret.

== Criticism ==
Senator Jay Rockefeller repeatedly sought to end the program. After Rockefeller and other Democratic senators hinted at the still-classified program's existence, Senate Republicans questioned whether any congressional rules had been violated. Opposition from both parties was described as intense and sustained behind closed doors for two years. Senator Ron Wyden argued that unmanned aerial vehicles could achieve Misty's objectives at substantially lower cost and risk, while George J. Tenet and Porter J. Goss were cited as staunch supporters.

By 2004, Misty's development costs had risen from US$5 billion to over US$9 billion, with annual spending estimated in the hundreds of millions of dollars. The same report stated that Zirconic's stealth satellite line was the largest single line item in an approximately US$40 billion intelligence-related budget. The planned third and final satellite, Misty, followed earlier launches in 1990 and 1999. Critics argued that secrecy surrounding programs like Zirconic enabled unchecked spending, as industry lobbyists with the necessary clearances had privileged access while skeptics remained uninformed.

Investigative journalist Patrick Radden Keefe argued that part of the ineffectiveness of the stealth satellite program is the ability of amateur observers to spot and track these satellites.

== Later stealth satellite research ==
Due to the classified and secret nature of such work, little public information exists about later developments between the U.S. and other states on the subject of stealth satellite technology after the 2007 termination of the Misty program. Breaking Defense reported that both China and Russia were experimenting with stealth satellite programs, according to the U.S. Space Force with China researching such systems since at least 2012. In 2021 and 2025, the South China Morning Post and The Debrief reported on optical camouflage testing for spacecraft by researchers at China's Zhejiang University, involving composite materials coating spacecraft to deflect radar and more efficiently dissipate heat.

== See also ==
- Future Ground Architecture
- Future Imagery Architecture
- Imagery intelligence
- National technical means of verification
- KH-11 KENNEN

== Sources ==
- Richelson, Jefferey T. (2002). The wizards of Langley: Inside the CIA's directorate of science and technology. Oxford: Westview Press. ISBN 9780813340593.
- Keefe, Patrick Radden (1 February 2006). "I Spy". Wired. Archived from the original on 15 December 2015.
- Office of Technology Assessment (2014) [1986]. "ASAT capabilities and countermeasures". Strategic Defenses: Two Reports by the Office of Technology Assessment. Princeton University Press. pp. 49–88.
