= National Reconnaissance Office =

US intelligence agency in charge of satellite intelligence

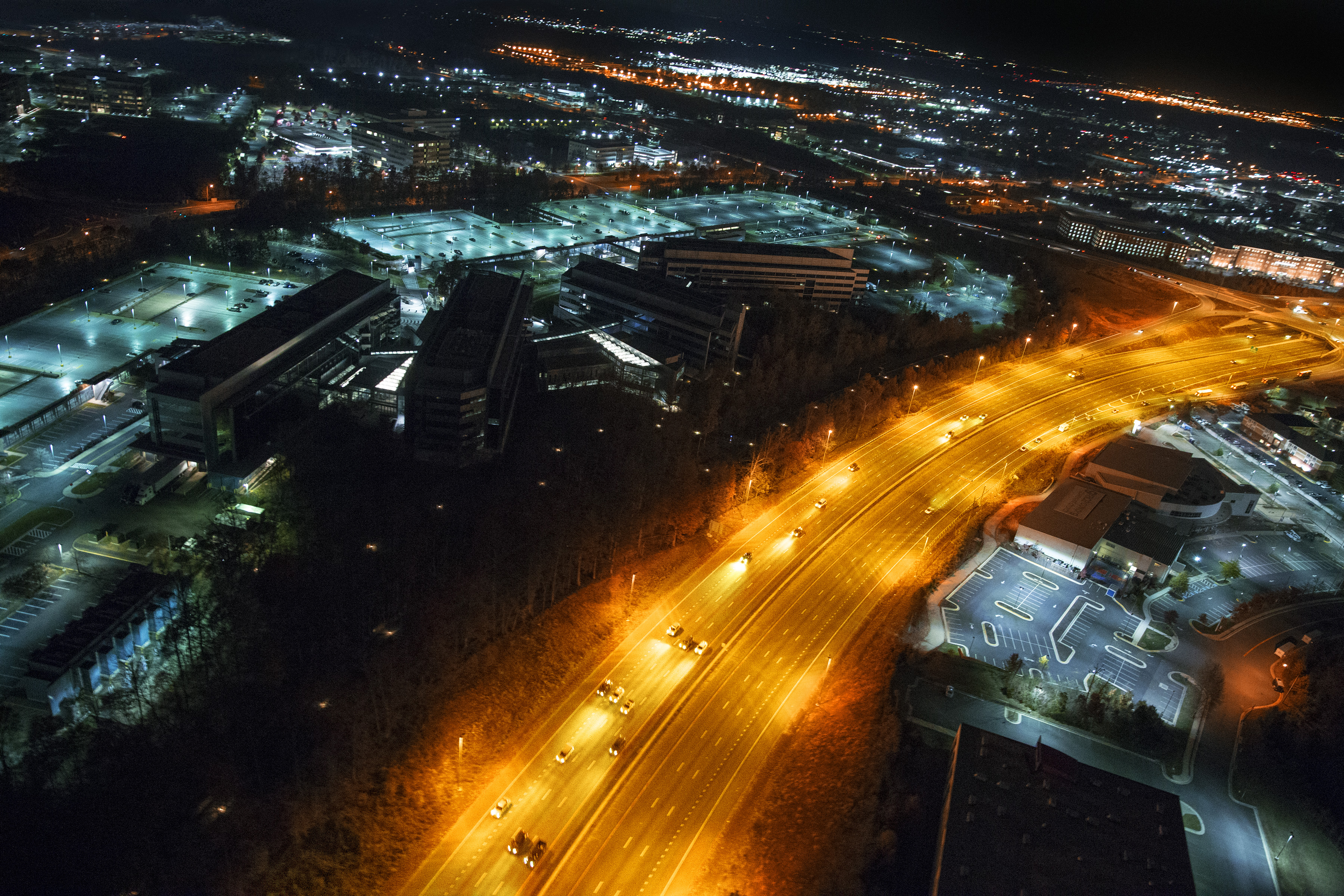
- NRO headquarters at night

Agency overview
- Formed: Established: August 25, 1960; Declassified: September 18, 1992
- Jurisdiction: United States
- Headquarters: Chantilly, Virginia, U.S.; 38°52′55″N 77°27′01″W
- Motto: Supra Et Ultra (Above and Beyond)
- Annual budget: Classified
- Agency executive: Roger Mason, Director
- Parent agency: Department of Defense
- Website: www.nro.gov

The National Reconnaissance Office (NRO) is an agency of the United States Department of Defense and a member of the U.S. Intelligence Community which designs, builds, launches, and operates the intelligence satellites of the U.S. federal government. It provides satellite intelligence to several government agencies, particularly signals intelligence (SIGINT) to the National Security Agency (NSA), imagery intelligence (IMINT) to the National Geospatial-Intelligence Agency (NGA), and measurement and signature intelligence (MASINT) to the Defense Intelligence Agency (DIA). The NRO announced in 2023 that it plans within the following decade to quadruple the number of satellites it operates and increase the number of signals and images it delivers by a factor of ten.

NRO is considered, along with the Central Intelligence Agency (CIA), NSA, DIA, and NGA, to be one of the "big five" U.S. intelligence agencies. The NRO is headquartered in Chantilly, Virginia, 2 miles (3.2 km) south of Washington Dulles International Airport. Historically, the NRO has maintained a close relationship with the CIA, and CIA officers and interns are often assigned to the NRO.

The director of the NRO reports to both the director of national intelligence and the secretary of defense. The NRO's federal workforce is a hybrid organization consisting of some 3,000 personnel including NRO cadre, Air Force, Army, CIA, NGA, NSA, Navy and U.S. Space Force personnel. A 1996 bipartisan commission report described the NRO as having by far the largest budget of any intelligence agency, and "virtually no federal workforce", accomplishing most of its work through "tens of thousands" of defense contractor personnel. From its founding in 1961 the NRO's existence was classified and not revealed publicly until 1992.

== Mission ==
The National Reconnaissance Office develops, builds, launches, and operates space reconnaissance and surveillance systems and conducts intelligence-related activities for U.S. national security.

The NRO also coordinates collection and analysis of information from airplane and satellite reconnaissance by the military services and the Central Intelligence Agency. It is funded through the National Reconnaissance Program, which is part of the National Intelligence Program (formerly known as the National Foreign Intelligence Program). The agency is part of the Department of Defense.

The NRO works closely with its intelligence and space partners, which include the National Security Agency (NSA), the National Geospatial-Intelligence Agency (NGA), the Central Intelligence Agency (CIA), the Defense Intelligence Agency (DIA), the United States Strategic Command, the United States Space Command, Naval Research Laboratory, and other agencies and organizations.

== History ==
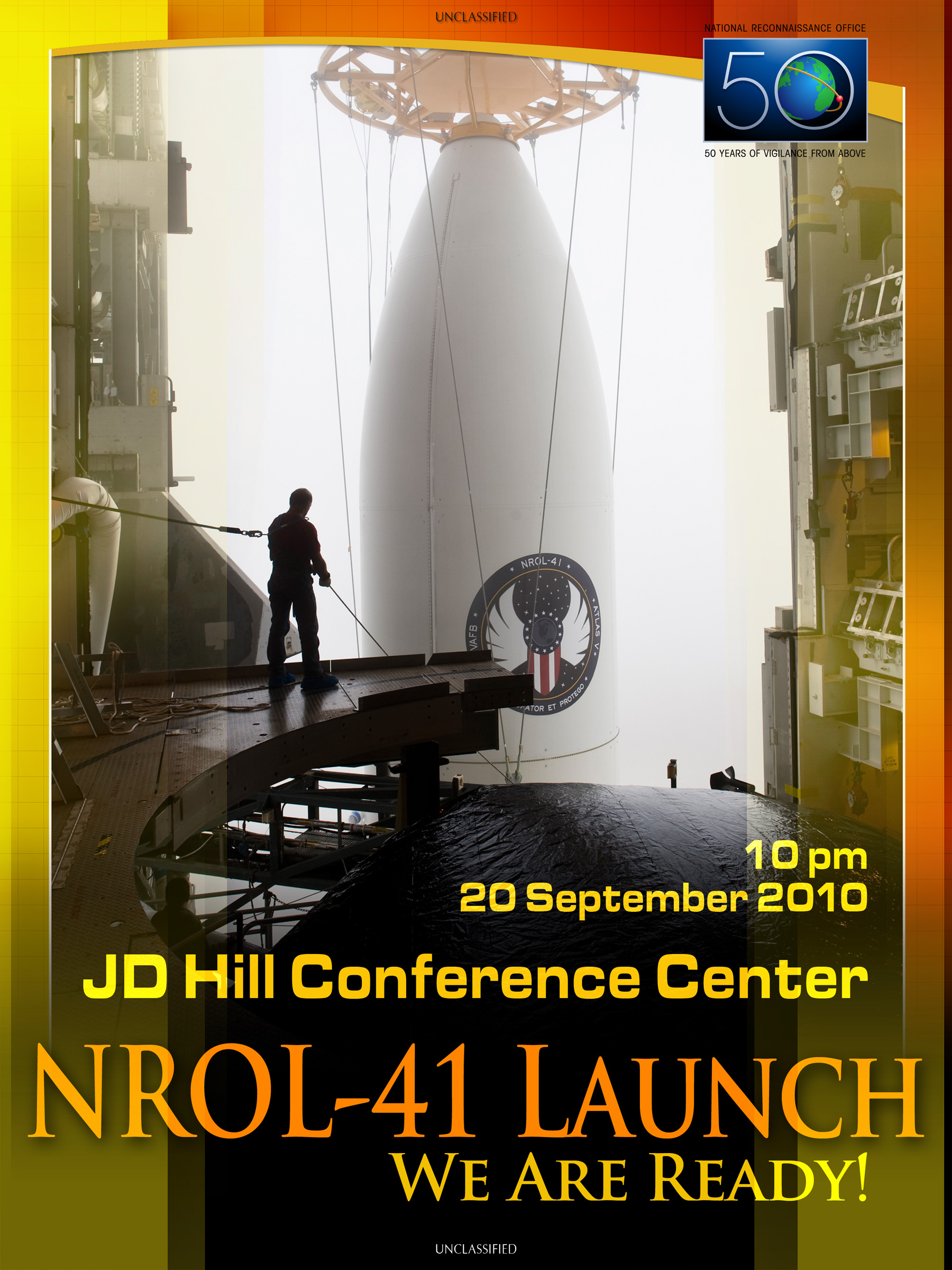
Close-up of Atlas 501 payload fairing with NROL-41 satellite (poster commemorating 50 years of NRO)

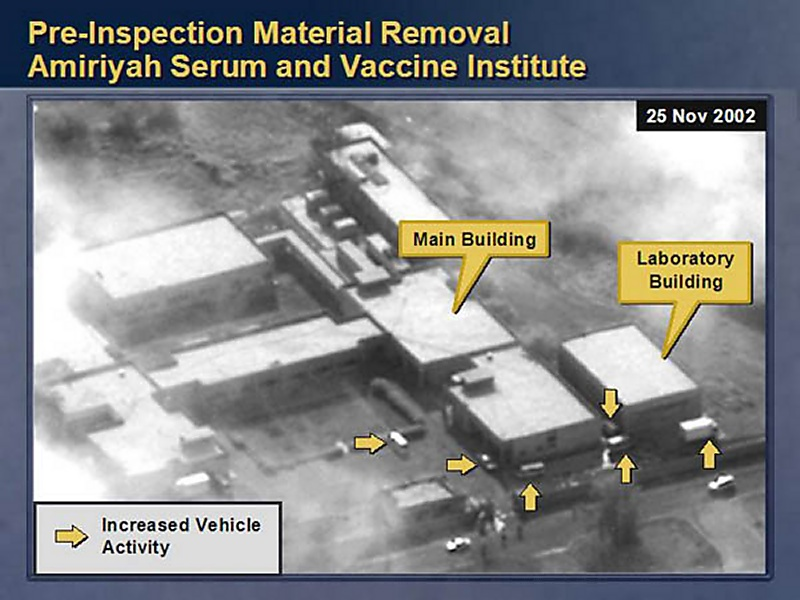
Serum and Vaccine Institute in Al-A'amiriya, Iraq, as imaged by a US reconnaissance satellite in November 2002

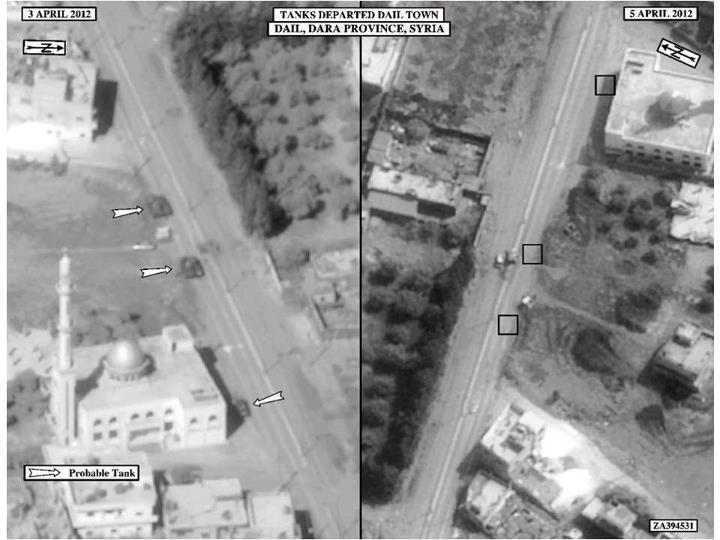
US Satellite imagery of Syrian tanks departing Da'el in Daraa province after several days of assaults against the town in April 2012

On 1 May 1960, a Central Intelligence Agency Lockheed U-2 was shot down over the Soviet Union, limiting reconnaissance flights to the edges of the Soviet Union and sparking Congress to increase funding for space based reconnaissance such as SAMOS and Missile Defense Alarm System - MIDAS. On 10 June 1960, President Eisenhower directed secretary of defense Thomas S. Gates Jr. to reassess space-based intelligence requirements, concluding that Samos, the Corona program, and U-2 all represented national assets and that they should be organized under a civilian agency in the Defense Department, not a single military service. There had been management problems and insufficient progress with the USAF satellite reconnaissance program. Forming NRO was based on a recommendation on August 25, 1960 to President Dwight D. Eisenhower during a special National Security Council meeting. The agency was to coordinate the USAF and CIA's (and later the navy and NSA's) reconnaissance activities. On 31 August 1960, Secretary of the Air Force Dudley C. Sharp created the Office of Missile and Satellite Systems under the Assistant Secretary of the Air Force to coordinate Air Force, Central Intelligence Agency, Navy, and National Security Agency intelligence reconnaissance activities. On 6 September 1961, the Office of Missile and Satellite Systems became the National Reconnaissance Office, taking over all space reconnaissance programs, such as Samos and Corona. Only MIDAS and the Vela nuclear detonation detection satellites remained in the Air Force's satellite inventory.

The NRO's first photo reconnaissance satellite program was the Corona program, the existence of which was declassified February 24, 1995, and which existed from August 1960 to May 1972 (although the first test flight occurred on February 28, 1959). The Corona system used (sometimes multiple) film capsules dropped by satellites, which were recovered mid-air by military craft. The first successful recovery from space (Discoverer XIII) occurred on August 12, 1960, and the first image from space was seen six days later. The first imaging resolution was 8 meters, which was improved to 2 meters. Individual images covered, on average, an area of about 10 by 120 miles (16 by 193 km). The last Corona mission (the 145th), was launched May 25, 1972, and this mission's last images were taken May 31, 1972. From May 1962 to August 1964, the NRO conducted 12 mapping missions as part of the "Argon" system. Only seven were successful. In 1963, the NRO conducted a mapping mission using higher resolution imagery, as part of the "Lanyard" program. The Lanyard program flew one successful mission.

NRO missions since 1972 are classified, and portions of many earlier programs remain unavailable to the public.

On August 18, 2000, the National Reconnaissance Office recognized its ten original Founders. They were: William O. Baker, Merton E. Davies, Sidney Drell, Richard L. Garwin, Amrom Harry Katz, James R. Killian, Edwin H. Land, Frank W. Lehan, William J. Perry, Edward M. Purcell. Although their early work was highly classified, this group of men went on to extraordinary public accomplishments, including a Secretary of Defense, a Nobel Laureate, a president of MIT, a recipient of the Presidential Medal of Science, a renowned planetary scientist, and more.

=== Existence ===
The NRO was first mentioned by the press in a 1971 New York Times article. The first official acknowledgement of NRO was a Senate committee report in October 1973, which inadvertently exposed the existence of the NRO. In 1985, a New York Times article revealed details on the operations of the NRO.

Despite news coverage of NRO's existence, the United States intelligence community debated for 20 years whether to confirm the reports. The existence of the NRO was declassified on September 18, 1992, by the Deputy Secretary of Defense, as recommended by the Director of Central Intelligence. The brief press release did not mention the word "satellite", and the agency did not confirm for several more years that it launched satellites on rockets.

=== Funding controversy ===
A Washington Post article in September 1995 reported that the NRO had quietly hoarded between $1 billion and $1.7 billion in unspent funds without informing the Central Intelligence Agency, the Pentagon, or Congress.

The CIA was in the midst of an inquiry into the NRO's funding because of complaints that the agency had spent $300 million of hoarded funds from its classified budget to build a new headquarters building in Chantilly, Virginia, a year earlier.

In total, NRO had accumulated US$3.8 billion (inflation adjusted US$ 8 billion in 2025) in forward funding. As a consequence, NRO's three distinct accounting systems were merged.

The presence of the classified new headquarters was revealed by the Federation of American Scientists who obtained unclassified copies of the blueprints filed with the building permit application. After 9/11 those blueprints were apparently classified. The reports of an NRO slush fund were true. According to former CIA general counsel Jeffrey Smith, who led the investigation: "Our inquiry revealed that the NRO had for years accumulated very substantial amounts as a 'rainy day fund'."

=== Future Imagery Architecture ===
In 1999 the NRO embarked on a $25 billion project with Boeing entitled Future Imagery Architecture to create a new generation of imaging satellites. In 2002 the project was far behind schedule and would most likely cost $2 billion to $3 billion more than planned, according to NRO records. The government pressed forward with efforts to complete the project, but after two more years, several more review panels and billions more in expenditures, the project was killed in what a New York Times report called "perhaps the most spectacular and expensive failure in the 50-year history of American spy satellite projects."

=== Mid-2000s to present ===
On August 23, 2001, Brian Patrick Regan, a civilian employee of TRW at NRO, was arrested at Dulles International Airport outside Washington while boarding a flight for Zurich. He was carrying coded information about Iraqi and Chinese missile sites. He also had the addresses of the Chinese and Iraqi Embassies in Switzerland and Austria. He was sentenced to life in prison without parole for offering to sell intelligence secrets to Iraq and China.

In January 2008, the government announced that a reconnaissance satellite operated by the NRO would make an unplanned and uncontrolled re-entry into the Earth's atmosphere in the next several months. Satellite watching hobbyists said that it was likely the USA-193, built by Lockheed Martin Corporation, which failed shortly after achieving orbit in December 2006. On February 14, 2008, the Pentagon announced that rather than allowing the satellite to make an uncontrolled re-entry while still in one piece, it would instead be shot down by a missile fired from a Navy cruiser. The intercept took place on February 21, 2008, resulting in the satellite breaking up into multiple pieces.

In July 2008, the NRO declassified the existence of its Synthetic Aperture Radar satellites, citing difficulty in discussing the creation of the Space-Based Radar with the United States Air Force and other entities. In August 2009, FOIA archives were queried for a copy of the NRO video, "Satellite Reconnaissance: Secret Eyes in Space." The seven-minute video chronicles the early days of the NRO and many of its early programs. It was proposed that the NRO share the imagery of the United States itself with the National Applications Office for domestic law enforcement purposes. The NAO was disestablished in 2009. The NRO is a non-voting associate member of the Civil Applications Committee (CAC). The CAC is an inter-agency committee that coordinates and oversees the Federal- Civil use of classified collections. The CAC was officially chartered in 1975 by the Office of the President to provide Federal- Civil agencies access to National Systems data in support of mission responsibilities. According to Asia Times Online, one important mission of NRO satellites is the tracking of non-US submarines on patrol or on training missions in the world's oceans and seas.

At the National Space Symposium in April 2010, NRO director General Bruce Carlson, United States Air Force (Retired) announced that until the end of 2011, NRO is embarking on "the most aggressive launch schedule that this organization has undertaken in the last twenty-five years. There are a number of very large and very critical reconnaissance satellites that will go into orbit in the next year to a year and a half."

In 2012, a McClatchy investigation found that the NRO was possibly breaching ethical and legal boundaries by encouraging its polygraph examiners to extract personal and private information from DoD personnel during polygraph tests that were limited to counterintelligence issues. Allegations of abusive polygraph practices were brought forward by former NRO polygraph examiners. In 2014, an inspector general's report concluded that NRO failed to report felony admissions of child sexual abuse to law enforcement authorities. NRO obtained these criminal admissions during polygraph testing but never forwarded the information to police. NRO's failure to act in the public interest by reporting child sexual predators was first made public in 2012 by former NRO polygraph examiners.

On August 30, 2019, Donald Trump tweeted an image of "the catastrophic accident during final launch preparations for the Safir SLV Launch at Semnan Launch Site One in Iran". The image almost certainly came from a satellite known as USA 224, according to Marco Langbroek, a satellite tracker based in the Netherlands. The satellite was launched by the National Reconnaissance Office in 2011.

On January 31, 2020, Rocket Lab successfully launched a NROL-151 payload for the NRO.

On December 19, 2020, NROL-108 was successfully launched aboard SpaceX's Falcon 9 rocket. On July 15, 2020, NROL-149 was successfully launched aboard the first launch of Northrop Grumman's new Minotaur IV rocket. On April 27, 2021, NROL-82 was successfully launched aboard United Launch Alliance's Delta IV rocket. On June 15, 2021, NROL-111, a set of three classified satellites, was successfully launched aboard a Northrop Grumman Minotaur I rocket. On July 13, 2022, NROL-162 was launched aboard a Rocket Lab Electron rocket from Mahia, New Zealand. On September 24, 2022, NROL-91 (USA 338) was launched from Vandenberg Space Force Base's Space Launch Complex 6 (SLC-6) aboard a United Launch Alliance Delta IV Heavy.

In 2021, SpaceX reportedly won a $1.8 billion contract from the NRO to build a network of hundreds of spy satellites under its Starshield unit. The satellites reportedly will be able to "track targets on the ground and share that data with U.S. intelligence and military officials... enabling the U.S. government to quickly capture continuous imagery of activities on the ground nearly anywhere on the globe."

== Organization ==
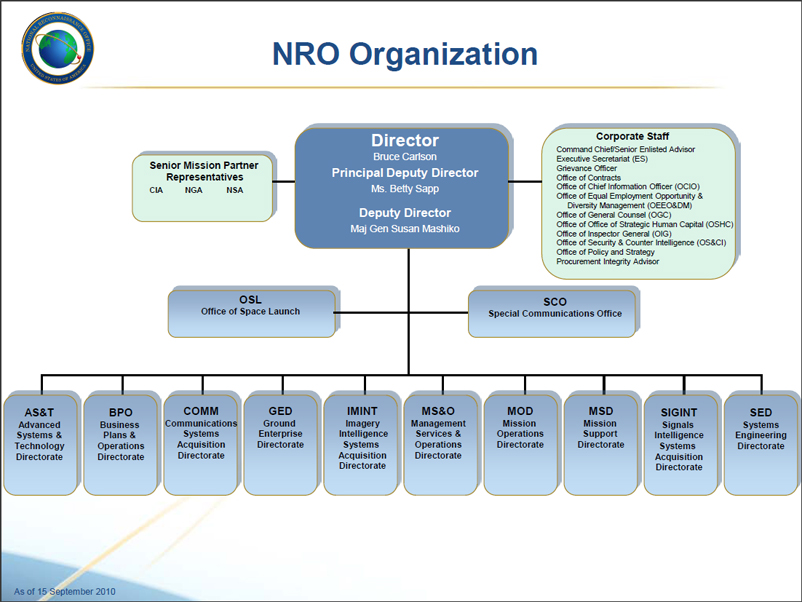
NRO Organizational Chart (Sep. 2010)

The NRO is part of the Department of Defense. The Director of the NRO is appointed by the President of the United States, by and with the consent of the Senate. Traditionally, the position was given to either the Under Secretary of the Air Force or the Assistant Secretary of the Air Force for Space, but with the appointment of Donald Kerr as Director of the NRO in July 2005 the position is now independent. The Agency is organized as follows:

Principal Deputy Director of the NRO (PDDNRO)

- Reports to and coordinates with the DNRO on all NRO activities and handles the daily management of the NRO with decision responsibility as delegated by the DNRO; and,
- In the absence of the Director, acts on behalf of the DNRO.

Deputy Director of the NRO (DDNRO)

- Senior USAF General Officer. Represents the civilian/uniformed USAF personnel assigned to the NRO;
- Assists both the DNRO and PDDNRO in the daily direction of the NRO; and,
- Coordinates activities between the USAF and the NRO.

The Corporate Staff

- Encompasses all those support functions such as legal, diversity, human resources, security/counterintelligence, procurement, public affairs, etc. necessary for the day-to-day operation of the NRO and in support of the DNRO, PDNRO, and DDNRO.

Office of Space Launch (OSL)

- Responsible for all aspects of a satellite launch including launch vehicle hardware, launch services integration, mission assurance, operations, transportation, and mission safety; and,
- OSL is NRO's launch representative with industry, the USAF, and NASA.

Advanced Systems and Technology Directorate (AS&T)

- Invents and delivers advanced technologies;
- Develops new sources and methods; and,
- Enables multi-intelligence solutions.

Business Plans and Operations (BPO)

- Responsible for all financial and budgetary aspects of NRO programs and operations; and,
- Coordinates all legislative, international, and public affairs communications.

Communications Systems Acquisition Directorate (COMM)

- Supports the NRO by providing communications services through physical and virtual connectivity; and,
- Enables the sharing of mission-critical information with mission partners and customers.

Ground Enterprise Directorate (GED)

- Provides an integrated ground system that sends timely information to users worldwide.

Geospatial Intelligence Systems Acquisition Directorate (GEOINT)

- Responsible for acquiring NRO's technologically advanced imagery collection systems, which provides geospatial intelligence data to the Intelligence Community and the military.

Management Services and Operations (MS&O)

- Provides services such as facilities support, transportation and warehousing, logistics, and other business support, which the NRO needs to operate on a daily basis.

Mission Operations Directorate (MOD)

- Operates, maintains and reports the status of NRO satellites and their associated ground systems;
- Manages the 24-hour NRO Operations Center (NROC) which, working with U.S Strategic Command, provides defensive space control and space protection, monitors satellite flight safety, and provides space situational awareness.

Mission Integration Directorate (MID)

- Engages with users of NRO systems to understand their operational and intelligence problems and provide solutions in collaboration with NRO's mission partners.
- Manages the Tactical Defense Space Reconnaissance (TacDSR) Program to directly answer emerging warfighting intelligence requirements of the Combatant Commands (CCMDs), Services, and other tactical users as funded by the Department of Defense (DoD) Military Intelligence Program (MIP).

Signals Intelligence Systems Acquisition Directorate (SIGINT)

- This directorate builds and deploys NRO's signals intelligence satellite systems that collect communication, electronic, and foreign instrumentation signals intelligence.

Systems Engineering Directorate (SED)

- Provides beginning-to-end systems engineering for all of NRO's systems.

=== Personnel ===
In 2007, the NRO described itself as "a hybrid organization consisting of some 3,000 personnel and jointly staffed by members of the armed services, the Central Intelligence Agency and DOD civilian personnel." Between 2010 and 2012, the workforce is expected to increase by 100. The majority of workers for the NRO are private corporate contractors, with $7 billion of the agency's $8 billion budget going to private corporations.

=== Budget ===
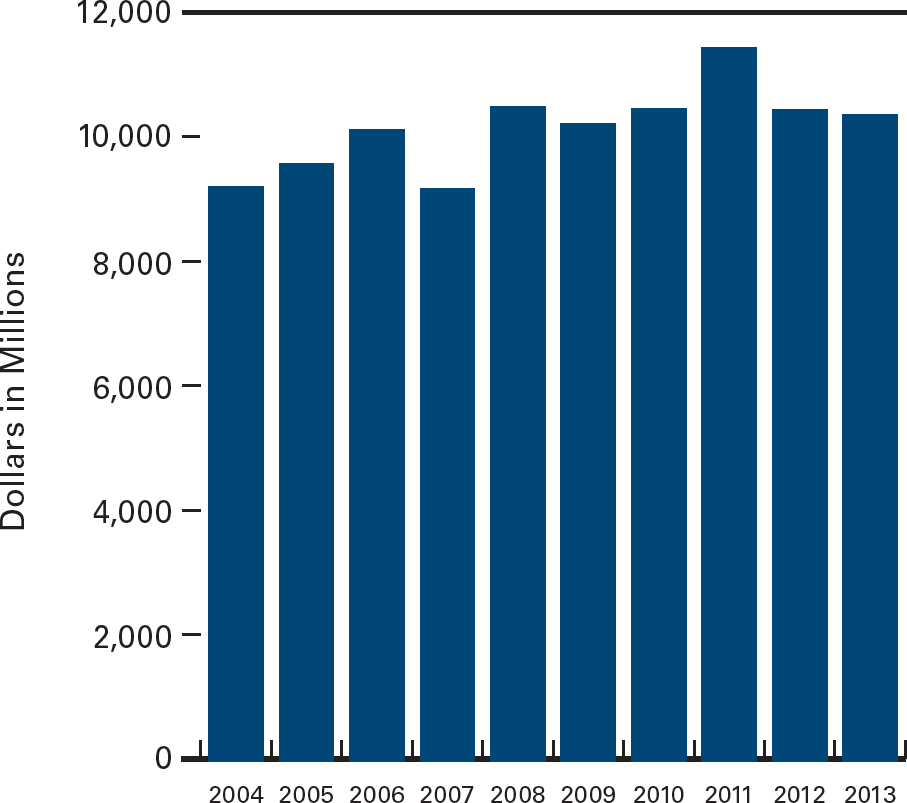
NRO budget FY 2004 to 2013

The NRO derives its funding both from the US intelligence budget and the military budget. In 1971, the annual budget was estimated to be around $1 billion in nominal dollars ($ 7.9 billion real in 2025). A 1975 report by the Congressional Commission on the Organization of the Government for the Conduct of Foreign Policy states that the NRO had "the largest budget of any intelligence agency". By 1994, the annual budget had risen to $6 billion (inflation adjusted $ 13 billion in 2025), and for 2010 it is estimated to amount to $15 billion (inflation adjusted $ 22.1 billion in 2025). This would correspond to 19% of the overall US intelligence budget of $80 billion for FY2010. For Fiscal Year 2012 the budget request for science and technology included an increase to almost 6% (about $600 million) of the NRO budget after it had dropped to just about 3% of the overall budget in the years before.

=== NRO directives and instructions ===
Under the Freedom of Information Act, the NRO declassified a list of secret directives for internal use. The following is a list of the released directives, which are available for download:

- NROD 10-2 – "National Reconnaissance Office External Management Policy"
- NROD 10-4 – "National Reconnaissance Office Sensitive Activities Management Group"
- NROD 10-5 – "Office of Corporate System Engineer Charter"
- NROD 22-1 – "Office of Inspector General"
- NROD 22-2 – "Employee Reports of Urgent Concerns to Congress"
- NROD 22-3 – "Obligations to report evidence of Possible Violations of Federal Criminal Law and Illegal Intelligence Activities"
- NROD 50-1 – "Executive Order 12333 – Intelligence Activities Affecting United States Persons"
- NROD 61-1 – "NRO Internet Policy, Information Technology"
- NROD 82-1a – "NRO Space Launch Management"
- NROD 110-2 – "National Reconnaissance Office Records and Information Management Program"
- NROD 120-1 – The NRO Military Uniform Wear Policy
- NROD 120-2 – "The NRO Awards and Recognition Programs"
- NROD 120-3 – "Executive Secretarial Panel"
- NROD 120-4 – "National Reconnaissance Pioneer Recognition Program"
- NROD 120-5 – "National Reconnaissance Office Utilization of the Intergovernmental Personnel Act Mobility Program"
- NROD 121-1 – "Training of NRO Personnel"
- NROI 150-4 – "Prohibited Items in NRO Headquarters Buildings/Property"

=== Coordination with USSPACECOM and USSF ===
At a mid-2019 press event just prior to the establishment of USSPACECOM, then-Air Force General John W. Raymond (set to lead the new command) stated that the NRO will "respond to the direction of the United States Space Command commander" to "protecting and defending those (space) capabilities". General Raymond further stated that "we [NRO and USSPACECOM] have a shared concept of operations, we have a shared vision and a shared concept of operations. We train together, we exercise together, we man the same C2 center, if you will, at the National Space Defense Center."

In December 2019, the United States Space Force (USSF) was established, also helmed by Raymond, now a Space Force General and Chief of Space Operations (CSO). NRO continued its close relationship with American military space operations, partnering with the Space Force's Space and Missile Systems Center (SMC) to manage the National Security Space Launch (NSSL) program, which uses government and contract spacecraft to launch important government payloads. NSSL supports both the USSF and NRO, as well as the Navy. NRO Director Scolese has characterized his agency as critical to American space dominance, stating that NRO provides "unrivaled situational awareness and intelligence to the best imagery and signals data on the planet."

In August 2021, Scolese said he, Raymond, and Dickinson recently agreed to a Protect and Defend Strategic Framework covering national security in space and the relationship between DOD and the intelligence community on everything from acquisition to operations.

== Technology ==
NRO's technology is likely more advanced than its civilian equivalents. In the 1980s, the NRO had satellites and software that were capable of determining the exact dimensions of a tank gun. In 2012 the agency donated two space telescopes to NASA. Despite being stored unused, the instruments are superior to the Hubble Space Telescope. One journalist observed, "If telescopes of this caliber are languishing on shelves, imagine what they're actually using."

=== NMIS network ===
The NRO Management Information System (NMIS) is a computer network used to distribute NRO data classified as Top Secret. It is also known as the Government Wide Area Network (GWAN).

=== Sentient AI satellite control system ===
Sentient is an automated (artificial intelligence) intelligence analysis system under development by the National Reconnaissance Office. A principal purpose of the Sentient system is described by the NRO as "compiling at machine, versus human speed, synthesis of complex distributed data sources for rapid analysis faster than humans can manage".

According to Robert Cardillo, a former director of the National Geospatial-Intelligence Agency, the Sentient system is intended to use "automated inferencing" to aid intelligence collection. The Verge described Sentient as "an omnivorous analysis tool, capable of devouring data of all sorts, making sense of the past and present, anticipating the future, and pointing satellites toward what it determines will be the most interesting parts of that future."

=== Spacecraft ===
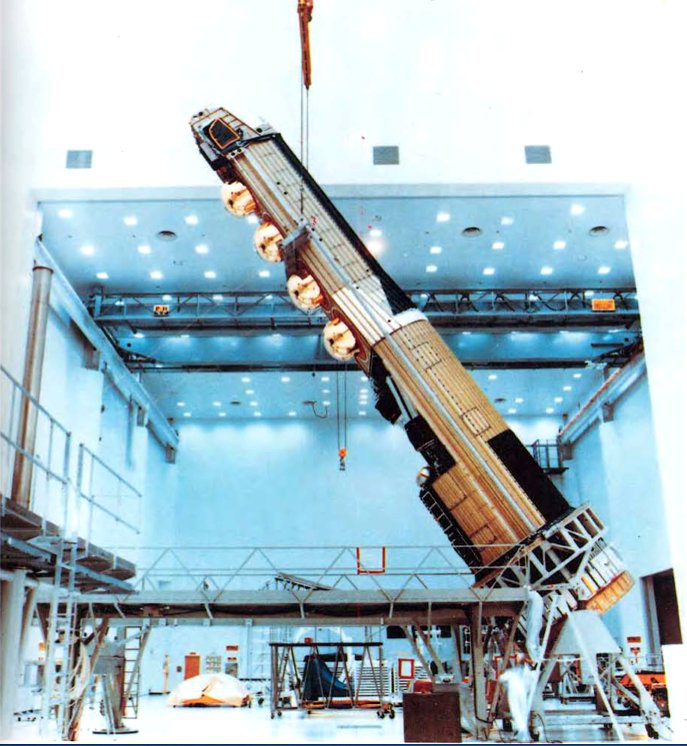
KH-9 Hexagon during integration at Lockheed

The NRO maintains four main satellite constellations:

- NRO SIGINT constellation
- NRO GEOINT constellation
- NRO Communications Relay constellation
- NRO Reconnaissance constellation

The NRO spacecraft include:

==== GEOINT imaging ====
- Keyhole series – Imagery intelligence:
  - KH-1, KH-2, KH-3, KH-4, KH-4A, KH-4B Corona (1959–1972)
  - KH-5 – Argon (1961–1962)
  - KH-6— Lanyard (1963)
  - KH-7 – Gambit (1963–1967)
  - KH-8 – Gambit (1966–1984)
  - KH-9 – Hexagon and Big Bird (1971–1986)
  - KH-10 – Dorian (cancelled)
  - KH-11 – Kennan (or Kennen), Crystal, Improved Crystal, Ikon, and Evolved Enhanced CRYSTAL System (1976–2013)
- Samos – photo imaging (1960–1962)
- Misty/Zirconic – stealth IMINT
  - Enhanced Imaging System
- Next Generation Electro-Optical (NGEO), modular system, designed for incremental improvements (in development).

==== GEOINT radar ====
- Lacrosse/Onyx – radar imaging (1988–)
- TOPAZ (1–5) and TOPAZ Block 2

==== SIGINT ====
- Samos-F – SIGINT (1962–1971)
- Poppy – ELINT program (1962–1971) continuing Naval Research Laboratory's GRAB (1960–1961), PARCAE and Improved PARCAE (1976-2008)
- Jumpseat (1971–1983) and Trumpet (1994–2008) SIGINT
- Canyon (1968–1977), Vortex/Chalet (1978–1989) and Mercury (1994–1998) – SIGINT including COMINT
- Rhyolite/Aquacade (1970–1978), Magnum/Orion (1985–1990), and Mentor (1995–2010) – SIGINT
- NEMESIS (High Altitude)
- ORION (High Altitude)
- RAVEN (High Altitude)
- INTRUDER (Low Altitude)
- SIGINT High Altitude Replenishment Program (SHARP)

==== Space communications ====
- Quasar, communications relay
- NROL-1 through NROL-66 – various secret satellites. NROL stands for National Reconnaissance Office Launch.

This list is likely to be incomplete, given the classified nature of many NRO spacecraft.

== Locations ==
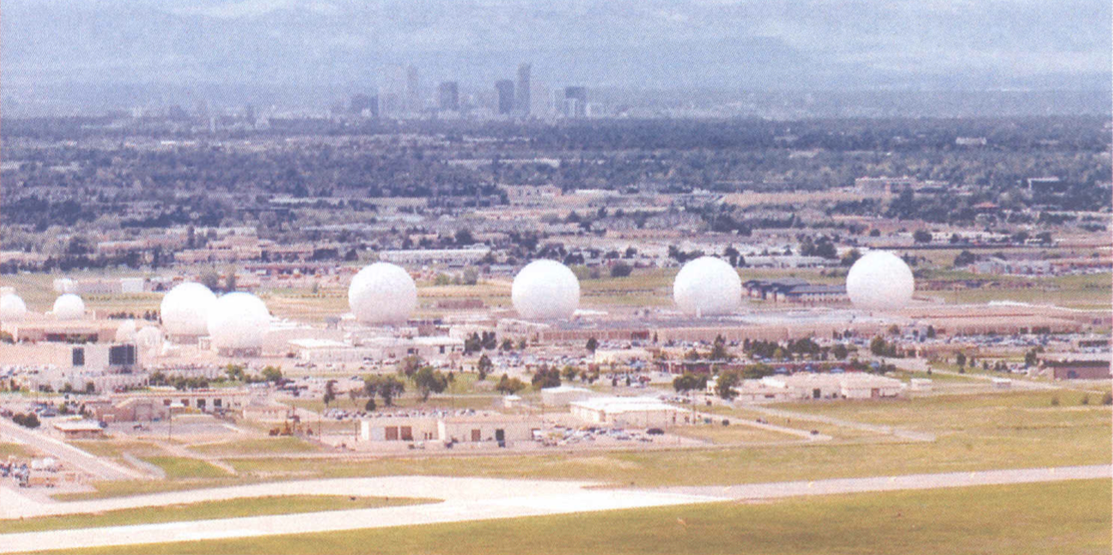
NRO ground station at Buckley Space Force Base, Aurora, CO

In October 2008, NRO declassified five mission ground stations: three in the United States, near Washington, D.C.; Aurora, Colorado; and Las Cruces, New Mexico, and a presence at RAF Menwith Hill, UK, and at the Joint Defence Facility Pine Gap, Australia.

- NRO Headquarters 38.882°N 77.452°W – Chantilly, Virginia
  - National Reconnaissance Operations Center (NROC)
- Aerospace Data Facility-Colorado (ADF-C) 39.718°N 104.777°W, Buckley Space Force Base, Aurora, Colorado
- Aerospace Data Facility-East (ADF-E) 38.736°N 77.158°W, Fort Belvoir, Virginia
- Aerospace Data Facility-Southwest (ADF-SW) 32.502°N 106.611°W, White Sands, New Mexico
- NRO spacecraft launch offices reside at Cape Canaveral Space Force Station, Florida and Vandenberg Space Force Base, California.

== In popular culture ==
- The NRO is featured in Dan Brown's novel Deception Point.
- Horror roleplaying game Delta Green features the NRO.
- In the film Mammoth, they are the men in black.

== Image gallery ==
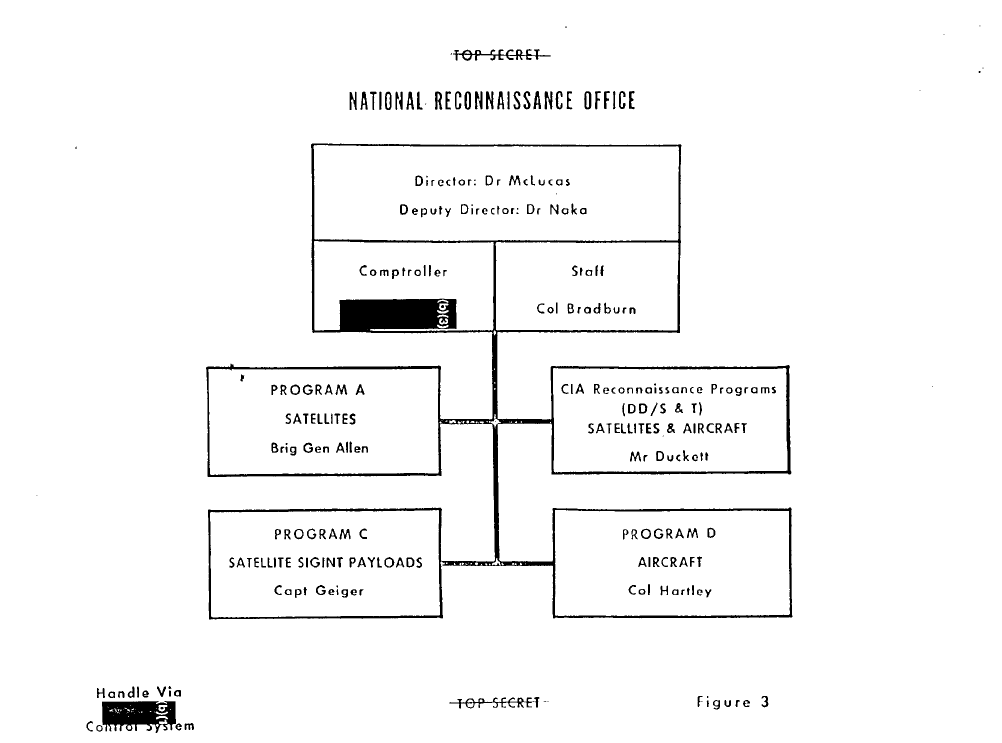
NRO Organization, c. 1971

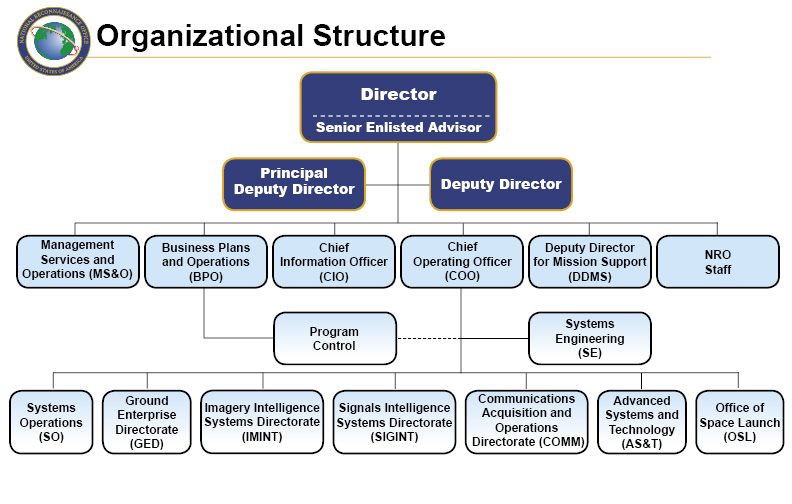
NRO Organization, c. 2009

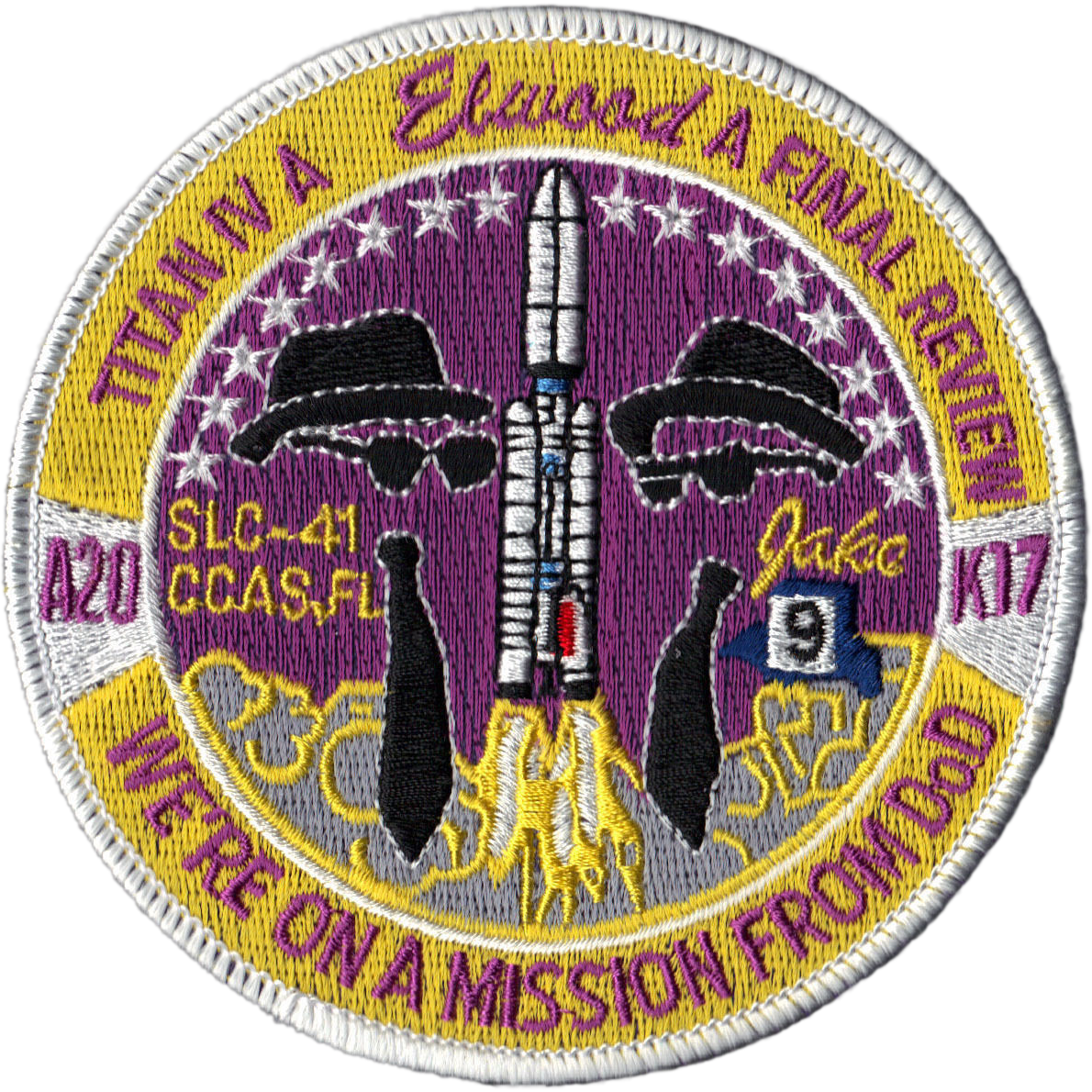
The Blues Brothers featured on the National Reconnaissance Office launch number 7 (NROL-7) mission patch

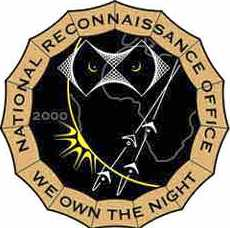
Patch commemorating launch of a classified payload National Reconnaissance Office launch number 11 (NROL-11) mission patch

The official mission patch from Launch-39

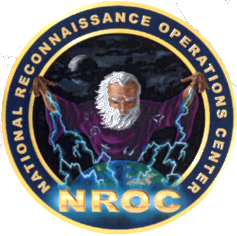
National Reconnaissance Operations Center

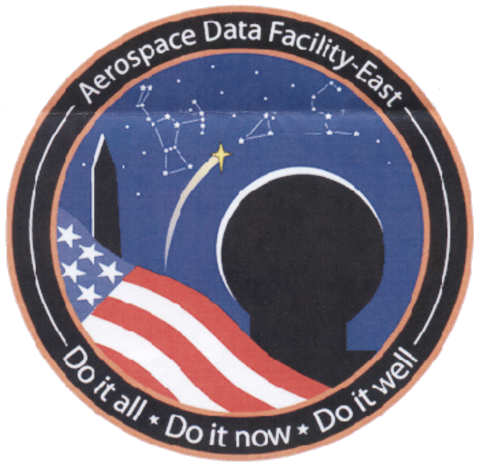
ADF-East logo

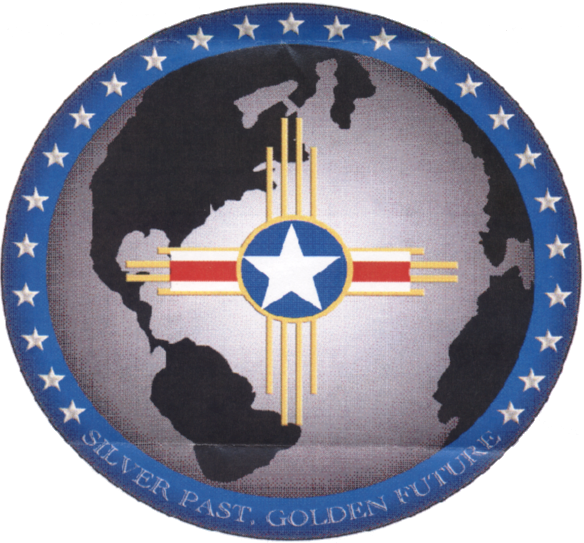
ADF-Southwest logo

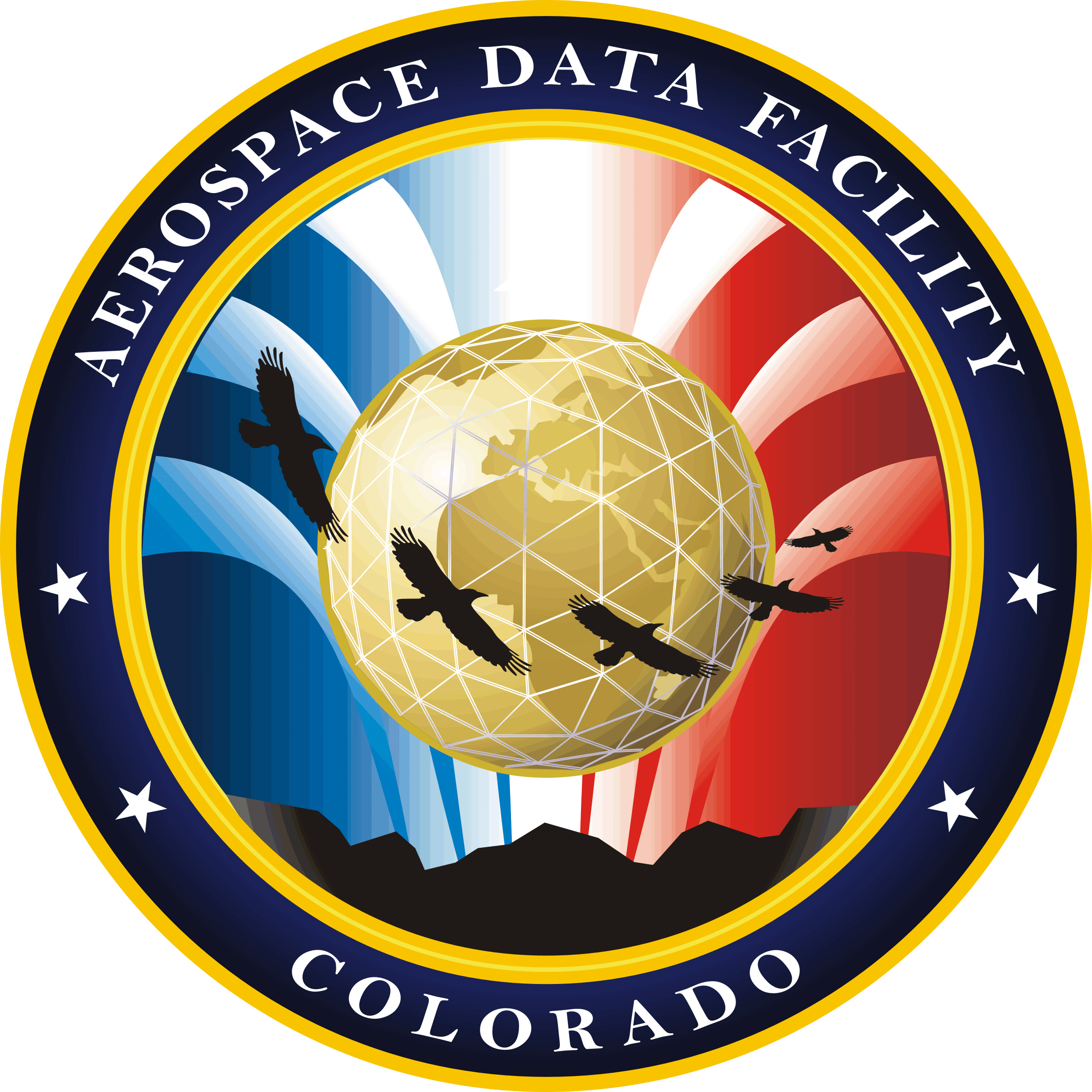
ADF-Colorado logo

== See also ==
- List of NRO satellite launches
- National Geospatial-Intelligence Agency
- National Security Agency
- National Underwater Reconnaissance Office
- National Technical Means
- Reconnaissance satellite
