= Future Imagery Architecture =

American spy satellite program

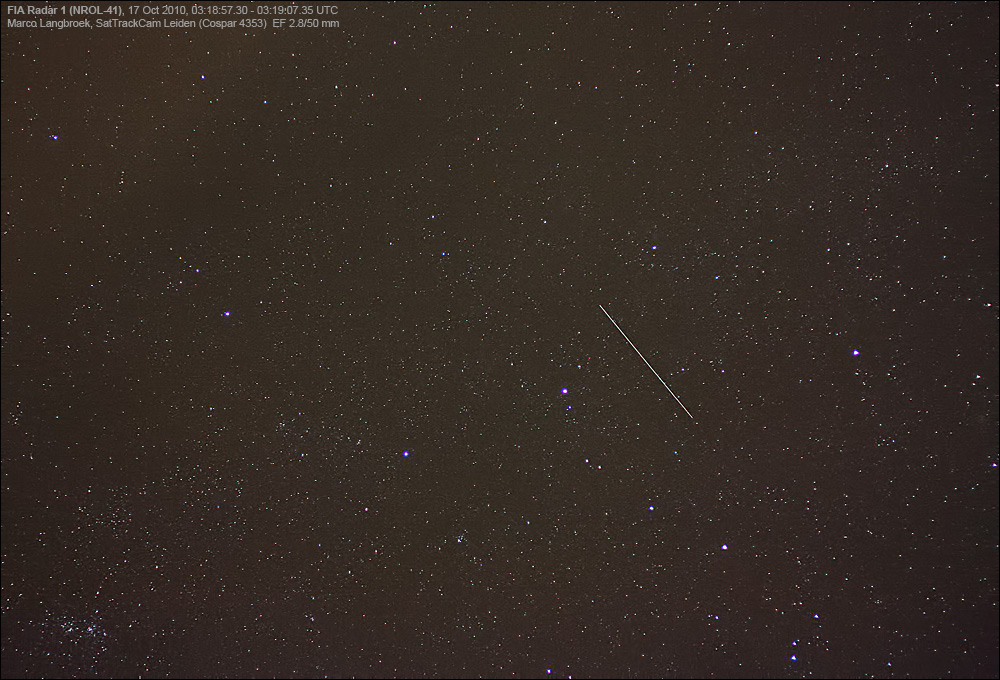
USA-215, believed to be the first operational payload resulting from the FIA program, crosses Cassiopeia

Future Imagery Architecture (FIA) was a program awarded to Boeing to design a new generation of optical and radar imaging US reconnaissance satellites for the National Reconnaissance Office (NRO). In 2005 NRO director Donald Kerr recommended the project's termination, and the optical component of the program was finally cancelled in September 2005 by Director of National Intelligence John Negroponte. FIA has been called by The New York Times "perhaps the most spectacular and expensive failure in the 50-year history of American spy satellite projects." Despite the optical component's cancellation, the radar component, known as Topaz, has continued, with four satellites in orbit as of February 2016.

== History ==
=== Contractors ===
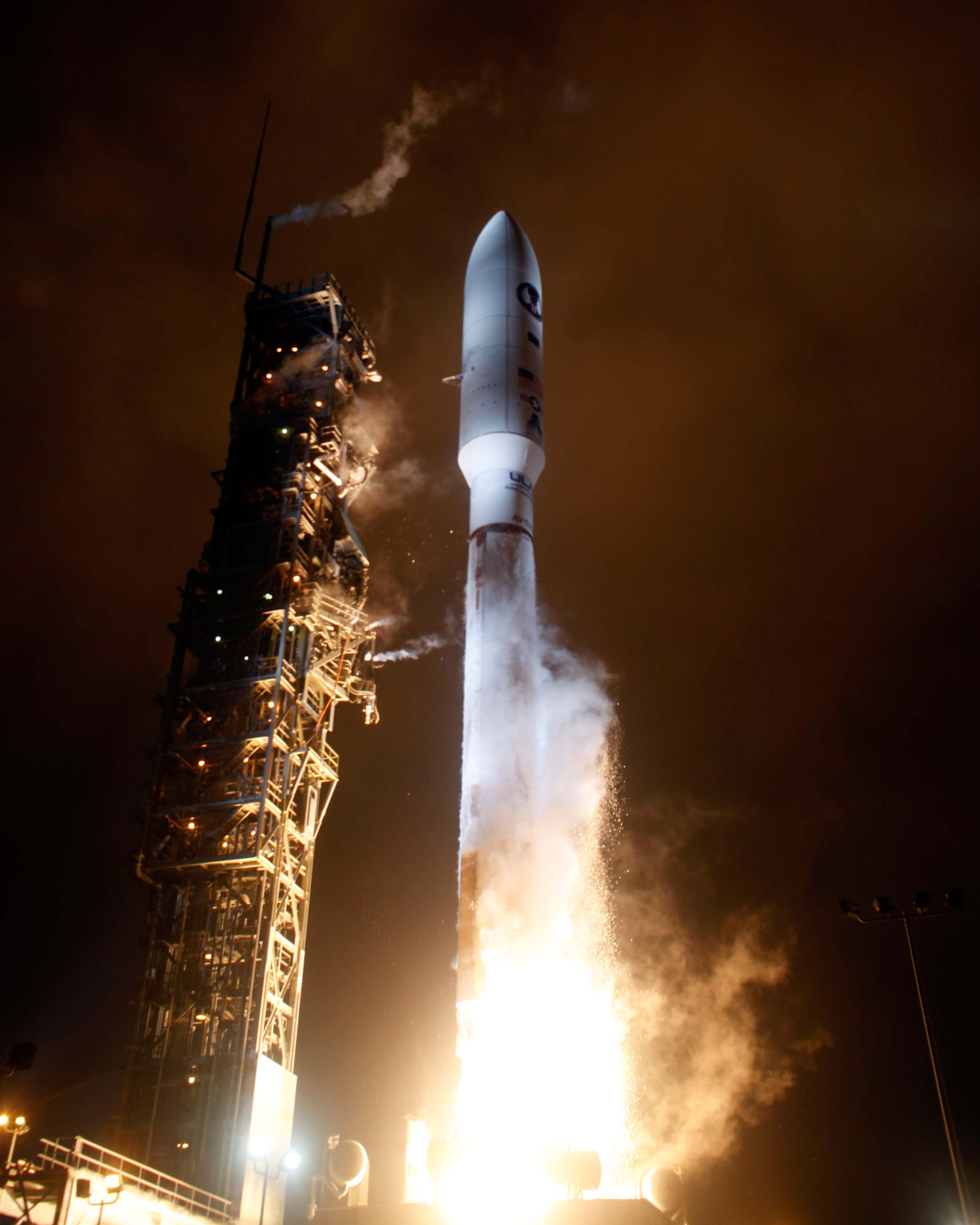
Launch of USA-215

In May 1999 Raytheon was awarded the contract for the deployment and integration of the ground infrastructure portion of FIA, the Mission Integration and Development (MIND) Program. In September 1999 the contract for the development, launch integration, and operations of FIA was awarded to the Boeing company, and its subcontractors Hughes Space and Communications Company, Raytheon, Kodak and Harris. The initial development budget was US$5 billion for the first 5 years, and the total lifetime budget was US$10 billion. A NRO evaluation team estimated that Lockheed Martin's competing proposal would require about US$1 billion (inflation adjusted US$ 1.93 billion in 2025) more to implement than Boeing's proposal. Boeing's promised cost-saving relied in a large part on the utilisation of commercial off-the-shelf hardware and software.

=== Research and development challenges ===
The exact scope and mission of FIA are classified, although the head of the NRO said in 2001 that the project would focus on creating smaller and lighter satellites. Some industry experts believe that a key objective is to make the satellites more difficult to attack, possibly by placing them in higher orbits. Because of the large size of the program, as well as number of workers involved, some experts have compared it to the 1940s Manhattan Project.

The project encountered a number of technical challenges. The required traveling-wave tube for the Radar Imaging proved to be highly challenging, resulting in significant schedule delays. Some of the problems with traveling-wave tubes were traced to charge built-up, while crossing radiation belts, resulting in electrical sparking, which in turn created carbon tracks, ultimately shorting the traveling-wave tubes.

The original optical specification could not be met, requiring a redesign. The system for the actuated Secondary Mirror positioning was difficult to stabilise, and required the introduction of additional struts and launch-locks. In 1Q FY03 Boeing shut down their Battery Division, and in 3Q FY03 their Power Electronics manufacturing facility in order to correct defective validation procedures and manufacturing processes. NRO subsequently directed Boeing to bring a 2nd, more experienced battery manufacturer into the project. Honeywell supplied radiation hardened HX-3000 ASICs, which due to their low power usage and high speed had been selected to serve multiple functions in the project (BRAM, ADD, EBWC, ERBC, ...), required several respins, and interventions to fix yield issues and manufacturing errors. In October 2003, issues with Control moment gyroscopes were delaying progress with the satellite bus. A NRO presentation on April 20, 2004 reported many issues with parts manufacturing and quality, and presented a new IMINT baseline.

=== Termination of IMINT FIA ===
By 2005, an estimated US$10 billion had been spent by the US government on FIA, including Boeing's accumulated cost overrun of US$4-5 billion, and it was estimated to have an accumulated cost of US$25 billion over the ensuing twenty years.

In reply to a request by the Permanent Select Committee on Intelligence, NRO on May 6, 2005 provided estimated termination costs for the i) full FIA program, ii) IMINT FIA, and iii) for a rescope of FIA into a new procurement program. This was followed by a report of an NRO appointed tiger team on August 12, 2005. In September 2005 DNI John Negroponte terminated the FIA IMINT contract with Boeing because of the cost overruns and delays of the delivery date. Instead Lockheed Martin received a contract to restart production of two legacy KH-11 Kennen satellite system with new upgrades.

In 2012 NRO donated two sophisticated but unneeded space telescopes, reportedly built for FIA, to NASA for use in astronomy.

=== IMINT radar ===
The contract for the imaging radar satellite remained with Boeing. In September 2010 NRO director Bruce Carlson stated that while most NRO "programs are operating on schedule and on cost", one program was "700 percent over in schedule and 300 percent over in budget".

== Technological innovations ==
=== Electro optical imaging ===
The optical system was specified to provide both high angular resolution via image stabilisation and wide angle (large field of view) capability. The optical telescope assets later transferred to NASA feature the following specifications and innovations:

- f/8 telescope with <20% obstructed aperture, 1.6 degree Cassegrain field of view
- 2.4m diameter f/1.2 lightweight ultra-low-expansion primary mirror with a surface quality better than 60 nm rms
- low coefficient of thermal expansion composite and invar structure
- combined mass of 1,700 kilograms (3,700 lb) for the telescope and outer barrel

Another key component of FIA was to launch and orbit at least 10 satellites, which would provide a 2.5 times higher cadence of viewing opportunities than the previous EOI constellation.

=== Radar imaging ===
The radar imaging system was specified to provide better image quality than previous system by employing a very strong radar signal. Images by an amateur astronomer hint at an antenna diameter of roughly 12 m.

== Launches ==
The first operational FIA Radar satellite, USA-215 or NROL-41, was launched on 21 September 2010. It is in a retrograde 1,100 km × 1,105 km (684 mi × 687 mi) orbit inclined by 123 degrees, an orbital configuration indicating it is an SAR satellite. On 3 April 2012, a second satellite, USA-234 or NROL-25, was launched into a similar orbit.

The earlier USA-193 satellite, launched in 2006, is believed to have been a technology demonstration satellite intended to test and develop systems for the FIA radar programme. However, it failed immediately after launch, and was subsequently destroyed by a missile.

=== Spacecraft ===
Name	COSPAR ID SATCAT No.	Launch date (UTC)	Launch vehicle	Launch site	Launch designation	Orbit	Decay date	Remarks
USA-215	2010-046A; 37162	21 September 2010; 04:03:30	Atlas V 501	VAFB SLC-3E	NROL-41	1,102 km × 1,105 km (685 mi × 687 mi) x 123°	in orbit	
USA-234	2012-014A; 38109	3 April 2012; 23:12:57	Delta IV M+(5,2)	VAFB SLC-6	NROL-25	Apx 1,100 km × 1,100 km (680 mi × 680 mi) x 123°	in orbit	
USA-247	2013-072A; 39462	6 December 2013; 07:14:30	Atlas V 501	VAFB SLC-3E	NROL-39	1,108 km × 1,113 km (688 mi × 692 mi) x 123°	in orbit	
USA-267	2016-010A; 41334	10 February 2016; 11:40:32	Delta IV M+(5,2)	VAFB SLC-6	NROL-45	1,077 km × 1,086 km (669 mi × 675 mi) x 123.0°	in orbit	
USA-281	2018-005A; 43145	12 January 2018; 22:10	Delta IV M+(5,2)	VAFB SLC-6	NROL-47	1,048 km × 1,057 km (651 mi × 657 mi) x 106°	in orbit	

== Successor program ==
USA-224, launched on 20 January 2011, is believed to be the first of the large post-FIA optical reconnaissance satellites built by Lockheed.

The failed FIA program is to be succeeded by the Next Generation Electro-Optical (NGEO) program. NGEO is intended as a lower-risk modular system, which is capable of being modified incrementally over its lifetime.

== See also ==
- Future Ground Architecture, also known as Sentient
