= Modular rocket =

Rocket with interchangeable components

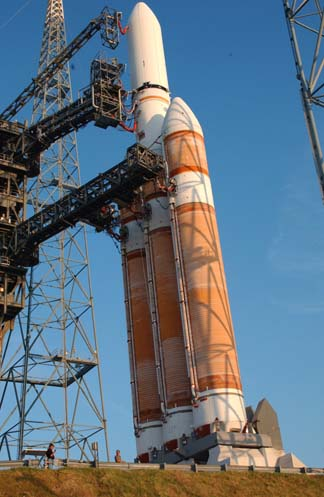
A Delta IV Heavy, featuring three Common Booster Cores; one used as the first stage and two as boosters

A modular rocket is a kind of multistage rocket which has components that can interchanged for different missions. Several such rockets use similar concepts such as unified modules to minimize expenses on manufacturing, transportation and for optimization of support infrastructure for flight preparations.

The National Launch System study (1991-1992) looked at future launchers in a modular (cluster) fashion. This concept has existed since the creation of NASA.

== Clustered common-core boost stage ==
Several designs have successfully used the modular rocket approach to cluster essentially identical liquid rockets to form the first (boost) stage of a heavy-lift launch vehicle. In 1997 Khrunichev State Research and Production Space Center proposed a revised plan for the Angara rocket family that follows the clustered approach. In 1999, for the United States National Security Space Launch EELV effort, Lockheed Martin was developing the Atlas V family, which was intended to include an Atlas V 'Heavy' configuration with a cluster of three Common Core Boosters. (Atlas V uses RD-180 engines and Angara uses related RD-191 engines.) Although the Atlas V Heavy was not selected for EELV, a similar clustered approach proposed by Boeing resulted in the Delta IV Heavy vehicle. Delta IV Heavy first flew in 2004 and the first clustered Angara, the Angara A5, first flew in 2014. In 2011 SpaceX shared its three-core Falcon Heavy design. Falcon Heavy first flew in 2018.

== Other modular approaches ==
Not all modular rocket approaches cluster similar rocket stages to form a boost stage. Zenit stages were used both as stand-alone first stages and as liquid boosters for the (dissimilar) Energia core sustainer stage. Atlas V uses a configurable number of solid rocket boosters around a liquid core to provide a modular and flexible design.

== Examples ==
=== Saturn C ===
A government commission, the "Saturn Vehicle Evaluation Committee" (better known as the Silverstein Committee), assembled in 1959 to recommend specific directions that NASA could take with the existing Army rocket program (Jupiter, Redstone, Sergeant). NASA's Space Exploration Program Council (1959-1963) was tasked with developing the launch architecture for the new Saturn rocket series, called Saturn C. The Saturn C architecture consisted of five different stages (S-I, S-II, S-III, S-IV, and S-V/Centaur) that could be stacked vertically for specific rockets to meet various NASA payload and mission requirements.

This work led to development of the Saturn I, Saturn IB, and Saturn V rockets.

=== Atlas V ===
The Atlas V expendable launch system uses the liquid fueled Common Core Booster as its first stage. In many configurations, a single CCB is used with strap-on solid rocket boosters. A proposed configuration for heavier loads strapped together three CCBs for the first stage. The Common Core Booster utilizes the Russian made RD-180 burning RP-1 fuel with liquid oxygen producing a thrust of 3.8 MN. The liquid propellant tanks use an isogrid design for strength, replacing previous Atlas tank designs which were pressure stabilized.

The length of the common core booster is 89 feet (27 m), and has a diameter of 12.5 feet (3.8 m).

=== Delta IV ===
The Delta IV launcher family used the liquid fuel Common Booster Core as the first stage of the various rocket configurations. One or three modules could be used as the first stage. In most configurations a single CBC is used with or without strap-on SRBs. Three CBCs together formed the first stage of the Heavy configuration. The CBC used the Rocketdyne RS-68 engine and burned liquid hydrogen with liquid oxygen producing a thrust of 2.9 meganewtons (650,000 lb_{f}).

=== Angara ===
The Universal Rocket Module (URM) is the modular liquid fueled first stage of the Angara expendable launch system. Depending on the configuration, the first stage can consist of 1, 3, 5 or 8 URMs. Each URM uses a Russian-made RD-191 engine burning RP-1 fuel with liquid oxygen producing a thrust of 1.92 MN.

=== Falcon Heavy ===
The Falcon Heavy launch vehicle consists of a strengthened Falcon 9 Block 5 center core with two regular Falcon 9 Block 5 core stages with aerodynamic nosecones mounted on top of both acting as liquid-fuel strap-on boosters. Each core is powered by nine Merlin 1D engines burning rocket-grade kerosene fuel with liquid oxygen producing almost 7.7 meganewtons (1,700,000 lb_{f}) of thrust, and all three cores together producing over 22 MN of thrust. A first design of the Falcon Heavy included a unique propellant crossfeed capability, where fuel and oxidizer to power most of the engines on the center core would be fed from the two side cores, up until the side cores would be near empty and ready for the first separation event. However, due to its extreme complexity this feature was cancelled in 2015 leaving each of the three cores to burn its own fuel. Later evaluations revealed that the propellant needed for each side booster to land (reuse) are already close to the margins so there is really no advantage to crossfeed.

Like the single stick Falcon 9, each Falcon Heavy booster core is reusable. The Falcon Heavy Test Flight demonstrated the two side boosters landing simultaneously near their launch site, while the central booster attempted a landing on SpaceX's Autonomous spaceport drone ship, which resulted in a hard landing near the ship. During the second mission all three boosters landed softly. A Falcon Heavy launch that succeeds in recovering all three core boosters has the same material expenditure as the Falcon 9, i.e. the upper stage and potentially the payload fairing. As such, the difference in cost between a Falcon 9 and a Falcon Heavy launch is limited, mainly to the extra fuel and refurbishing three as opposed to one booster core.

=== Kinetica 2 ===
The Kinetica 2 vehicle from CAS Space uses three identical boosters to form its first stage. LOX/kerosene propellants are used both for the YF-102 engines (three per core) on the boost stage and also for the upper stage engine. The Kinetica 2 maiden flight in March 2026 was reported as being fully successful.

== See also ==
- Long March 10
- Evolved Expendable Launch Vehicle
- Liquid Rocket Booster
- History: UR-700
