= RS-83 =

Proposed hydrolox rocket engine intended to surpass the RS-68

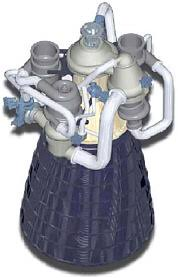
- Country of origin: United States
- Designer: Pratt & Whitney Rocketdyne
- Manufacturer: Pratt & Whitney Rocketdyne
- Application: first stage
- Status: prototype

Liquid-fuel engine
- Propellant: LOX / LH2
- Cycle: Gas-generator cycle

Performance
- Thrust, vacuum: 750,000 lbf (3,300 kN)
- Specific impulse, vacuum: 446 seconds (4.37 km/s)

Dimensions
- Dry mass: 12,700 pounds (5,800 kg)

The RS-83 was a rocket engine design for a reusable liquid hydrogen/liquid oxygen rocket larger and more powerful than any other. The RS-83 was designed to last 100 missions, and was intended for use on the first stage of a two-stage-to-orbit reusable launch vehicle.

== Development ==
It was developed by Rocketdyne Propulsion and Power, located in Canoga Park, California to power the launch vehicle as part of the Space Launch Initiative (SLI) program. This engine was designed to produce a thrust of 664,000 lbf (2,950 kN) at sea level and 750,000 lbf (3,300 kN) in a vacuum with an I_{sp} of 395 seconds (3.87 km/s) and 446 seconds (4.37 km/s) respectively.

The engine was designed to use many new technologies including ones developed for the Space Shuttle Main Engine (SSME). Technologies include channel wall regenerative nozzles, hydrostatic bearings, and turbine damping.

The RS-83 is loosely based on the RS-68 that powers the Delta IV expendable launch vehicle. The RS-83 design is more efficient, lighter, slightly stronger, and yet reusable. The engine design weight was 12,700 pounds (5,800 kg) with an engine thrust to weight ratio of 52 at launch.

One of the main goals of SLI was to develop components of a reusable launch vehicle with high reliability. The RS-83 was designed for a loss of vehicle rate of 1 in 1,000. Another goal of the program was to dramatically reduce the cost per unit weight of payload to low Earth orbit. The RS-83 was designed with the goal of $1,000/lb ($2,200/kg).

The engine passed numerous design reviews and was on schedule for prototype testing in 2005 before the SLI program was cancelled. NASA changed its focus to expendable launch systems used in the Constellation program for human spaceflights to the Moon and Mars.

== See also ==
- J-2 (rocket engine)
- RS-84
