= USA-245 =

American reconnaissance satellite

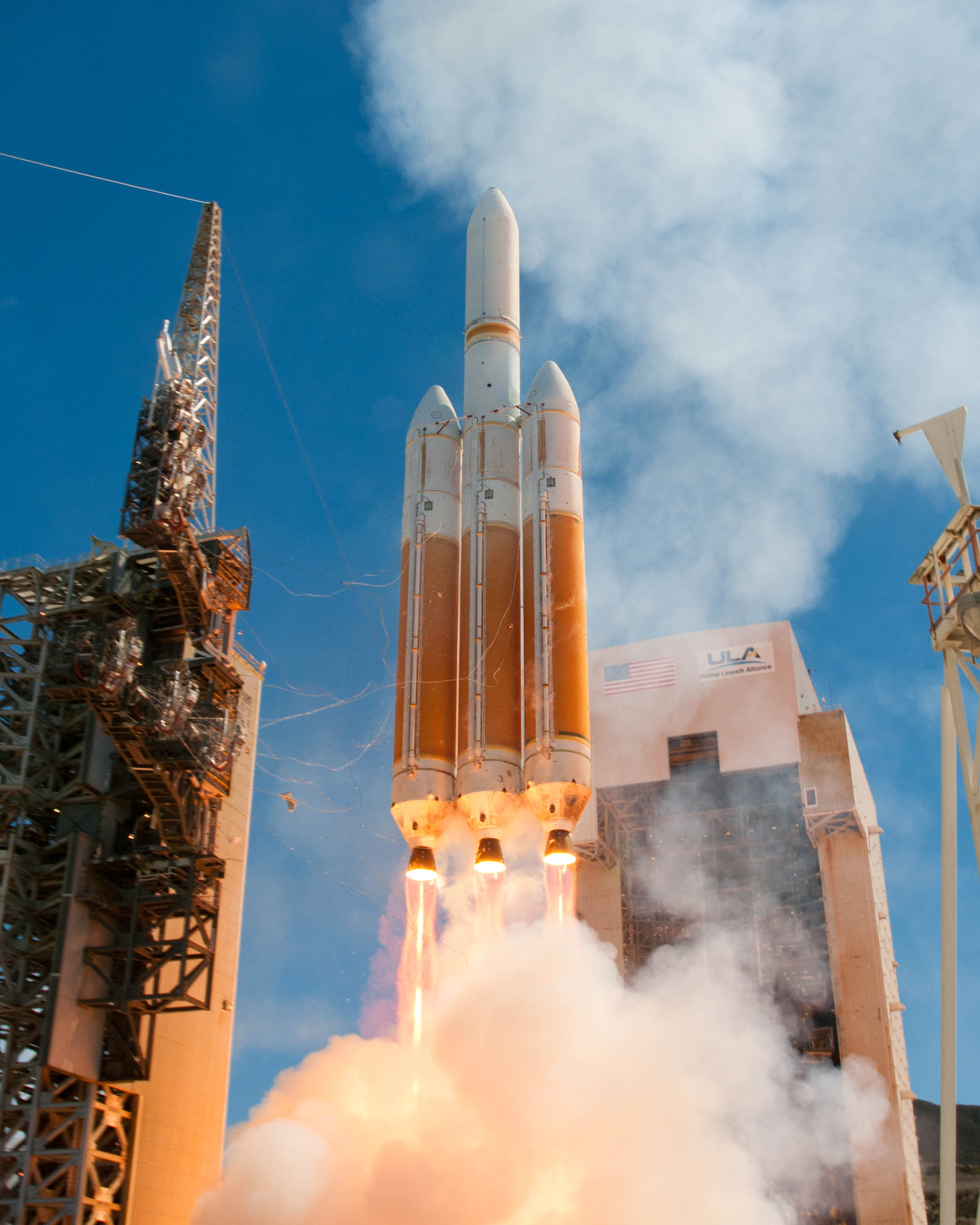
- Launch of USA-245
- Mission type: Optical imaging
- Operator: National Reconnaissance Office
- COSPAR ID: 2013-043A
- SATCAT no.: 39232

Spacecraft properties
- Spacecraft type: KH-11
- Manufacturer: Lockheed Martin

Start of mission
- Launch date: 28 August 2013 18:03:00 UTC
- Rocket: Delta IV Heavy (Delta 364)
- Launch site: Vandenberg, SLC-6
- Contractor: United Launch Alliance

Orbital parameters
- Reference system: Geocentric orbit
- Regime: Sun-synchronous orbit
- Slot: West plane
- Perigee altitude: 276 kilometres (171 mi)
- Apogee altitude: 1,010 kilometres (630 mi)
- Inclination: 97.86°
- Period: 97.44 minutes
- Epoch: 8 January 2015 19:32:46 UTC

USA-245 or NRO Launch 65 (NROL-65) is an American reconnaissance satellite which is operated by the National Reconnaissance Office. Launched in August 2013, it is the last Block 4 KH-11 reconnaissance satellite, and the last official spacecraft to be launched in the Keyhole program.

== Reconnaissance satellite ==
USA-245 imaged in orbit by amateur astrophotograph

Details of USA-245's mission are classified by the US military, however numerous independent analysts identified it as a KH-11 before launch, and amateur satellite watchers have since observed it in the orbit used by such satellites.

KH-11 satellites are used to provide high-resolution optical and infrared imagery for US intelligence agencies.

USA-245 was launched by United Launch Alliance, using a Delta IV Heavy rocket with the flight number Delta 364 and the name Victoria. The launch took place from Space Launch Complex 6 at the Vandenberg Air Force Base at 18:03 UTC (11:03 local time) on 28 August 2013. After deploying its payload, the rocket's upper stage was deorbited after completing one orbit. The launch was the first Delta IV mission to use a new ignition sequence aimed at reducing damage to the first stage insulation caused by igniting a cloud of hydrogen around the vehicle at liftoff. To mitigate this, the rocket's starboard engine was lit two seconds earlier than on previous flights.

In 2020, MIT Technology Review reported that USA-245 was likely being "stalked" by a Russian satellite, Kosmos 2542, in a possible attempt to spy on US-245 to deduce its camera aperture and resolution, or its computer functionality and operating times.
