= Pyrios =

Liquid rocket booster concept

Pyrios is an advanced Liquid rocket booster concept proposed in 2012 by Dynetics for use on NASA's Space Launch System heavy-lift launch vehicle. Pyrios was intended to use the RP-1/LOX F-1B, a modernized version of the F-1A engine built by Aerojet Rocketdyne. Developed during the later stages of the Apollo program, the F-1A was test-fired but never flew. Several were created and stored by Rocketdyne. The company has also maintained an F-1/F-1A knowledge retention program for its engineers for the entire period the engine has been mothballed. Dynetics is now performing tests on engine components pulled from storage. Pyrios was intended to use the same attachment points as the five-segment SRBs

The name is derived from Greek mythology. Pyrois was a horse that pulled sun god Helios’ chariot.
