= Delta Cryogenic Second Stage =

Japanese-American rocket stage

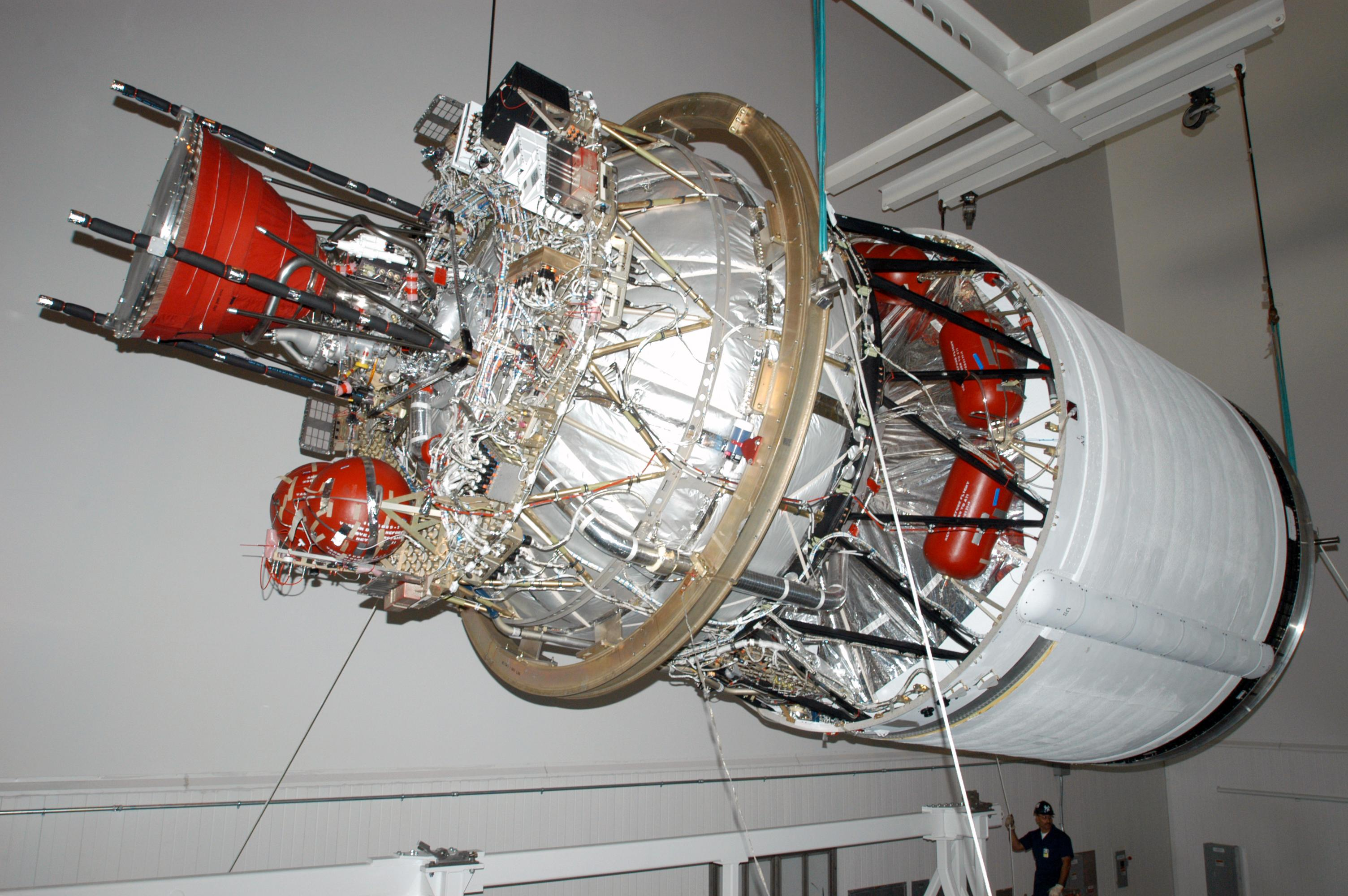
- A 4-meter DCSS from a Delta IV Medium
- Manufacturer: Boeing; United Launch Alliance; Mitsubishi (Delta III); NASDA (design)
- Country of origin: United States; Japan (Delta III)
- Used on: Delta III; Delta IV; Space Launch System

Launch history
- Status: Active
- Total launches: 45
- Successes (stage only): 42
- Failed: 2 (Delta III)
- Lower stage failed: 1 (Delta III)
- First flight: 27 August 1998

Delta III second stage
- Height: 8.8 m (29 ft)
- Diameter: 4 m (13 ft) (LH_{2} tank); 3.2 m (10 ft) (LOX tank)
- Empty mass: 2,480 kg (5,470 lb)
- Gross mass: 19,300 kg (42,500 lb)
- Powered by: 1 × RL10B-2
- Maximum thrust: 110.1 kN (24,800 lb_{f})
- Specific impulse: 462 s (4.53 km/s)
- Burn time: 700 seconds
- Propellant: LH_{2}/LOX

Delta IV 4-meter second stage
- Height: 12.2 m (40 ft)
- Diameter: 4 m (13 ft) (LH_{2} tank); 3.2 m (10 ft) (LOX tank)
- Empty mass: 2,850 kg (6,280 lb)
- Gross mass: 24,170 kg (53,290 lb)
- Powered by: 1 × RL10B-2
- Maximum thrust: 110.1 kN (24,800 lb_{f})
- Specific impulse: 462 s (4.53 km/s)
- Burn time: 850 seconds
- Propellant: LH_{2}/LOX

Delta IV 5-meter second stage
- Height: 13.7 m (45 ft)
- Diameter: 5 m (16 ft) (LH_{2} tank); 3.2 m (10 ft) (LOX tank)
- Empty mass: 3,490 kg (7,690 lb)
- Gross mass: 30,710 kg (67,700 lb)
- Powered by: 1 × RL10B-2
- Maximum thrust: 110.1 kN (24,800 lb_{f})
- Specific impulse: 462 s (4.53 km/s)
- Burn time: 1,125 seconds
- Propellant: LH_{2}/LOX

Interim Cryogenic Propulsion Stage
- Height: 13.7 m (45 ft)
- Diameter: 5 m (16 ft) (LH_{2} tank); 3.2 m (10 ft) (LOX tank)
- Empty mass: 3,800 kg (8,400 lb)
- Gross mass: 32,748 kg (72,197 lb)
- Powered by: 1 × RL10B-2 or RL10C-2
- Maximum thrust: 110.1 kN (24,800 lb_{f})
- Specific impulse: 462 s (4.53 km/s)
- Burn time: 1,125 seconds
- Propellant: LH_{2}/LOX

The Delta Cryogenic Second Stage (DCSS) is a family of cryogenic-fuelled rocket stages used on the Delta III, Delta IV, and on the Space Launch System Block 1 launch vehicles. The DCSS employs a unique two-tank architecture where the cylindrical liquid hydrogen (LH_{2}) tank carries payload launch loads and forms the upper section. An oblate spheroid tank filled with liquid oxygen (LOX) and the engine are suspended from the LH_{2} tank and covered by the interstage during initial launch.

The DCSS is powered by a single RL10B-2 engine built by Aerojet Rocketdyne, which features an extendable carbon–carbon nozzle to improve specific impulse.

The DCSS was designed by the National Space Development Agency of Japan, based on the second stage it developed for the H-IIA rocket. The initial versions for the Delta III were built by Mitsubishi Heavy Industries in Japan. For the Delta IV, production was transferred to Boeing Integrated Defense Systems and later to United Launch Alliance.

== Delta III ==
The DCSS first flew on three Delta III missions, however it was never successful. On its maiden flight, a booster failed and the rocket was destroyed by range safety, causing the loss of the DCSS before ignition. The second mission saw the DCSS itself malfunction tumbling uncontrollably, inserting the payload into a useless orbit. On the third flight, the DCSS performed its planned burn but fell short of the target orbit due to premature propellant exhaustion, resulting in mission failure. An un-flown example is on display outside the Discovery Cube Orange County.

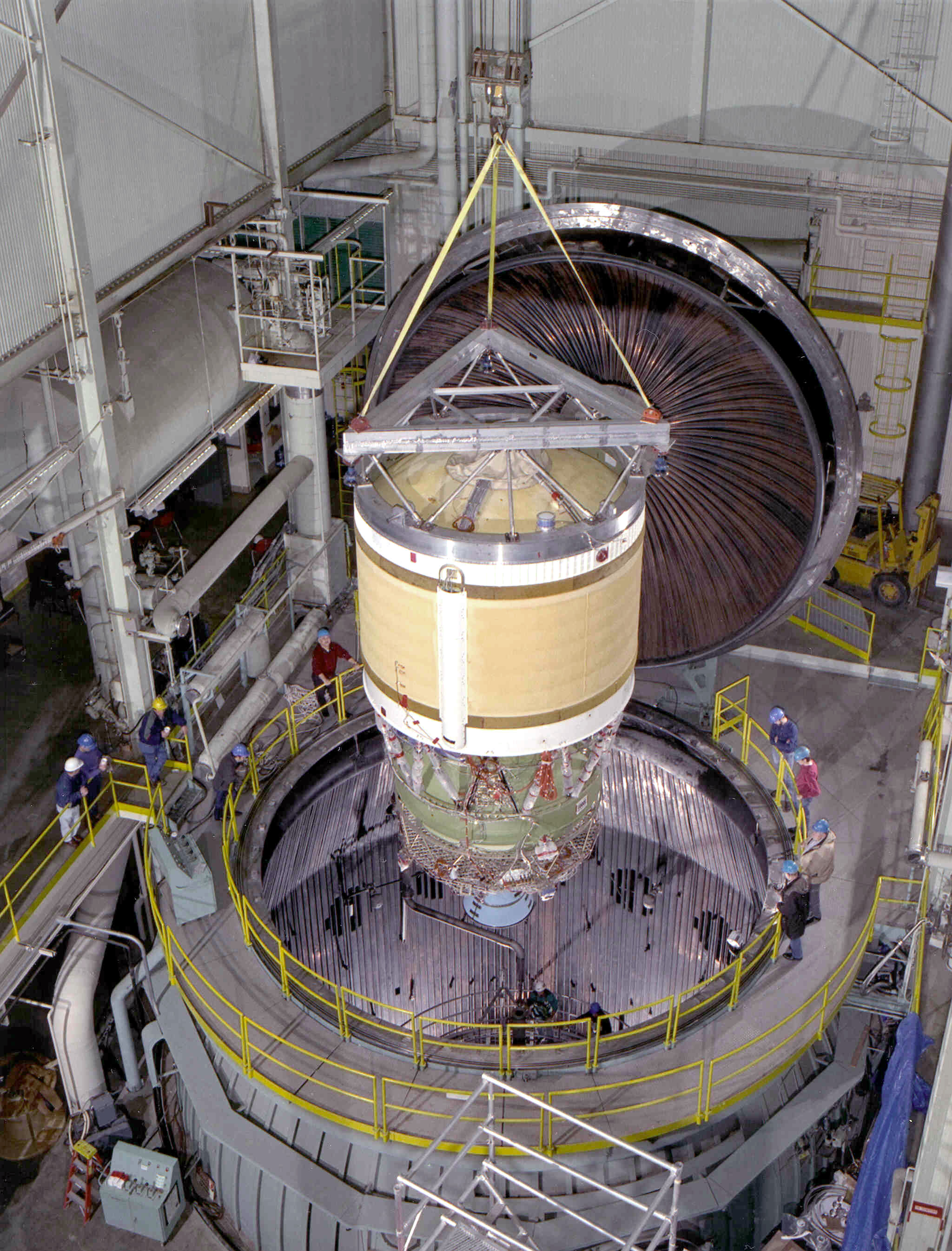
The Delta III upper stage being tested in January 1998

== Delta IV ==
Two variants of the DCSS were made for use on the Delta IV launch vehicle: a 4-meter variant similar to the version used on the Delta III, and a larger 5-meter variant for heavier payloads. The Delta IV Medium and Medium+ (4,2) used the 4-meter variant, while the 5-meter variant was used by the other Medium+ configurations as well as the Delta IV Heavy. A composite interstage was used to link the upper stage to the Common Booster Core of the Delta IV, with the smaller variant requiring a tapered design to transition to the CBC's 5-meter diameter.

The Delta IV family of rockets has been retired, with a final launch on 9 April 2024.

== Interim Cryogenic Propulsion Stage ==
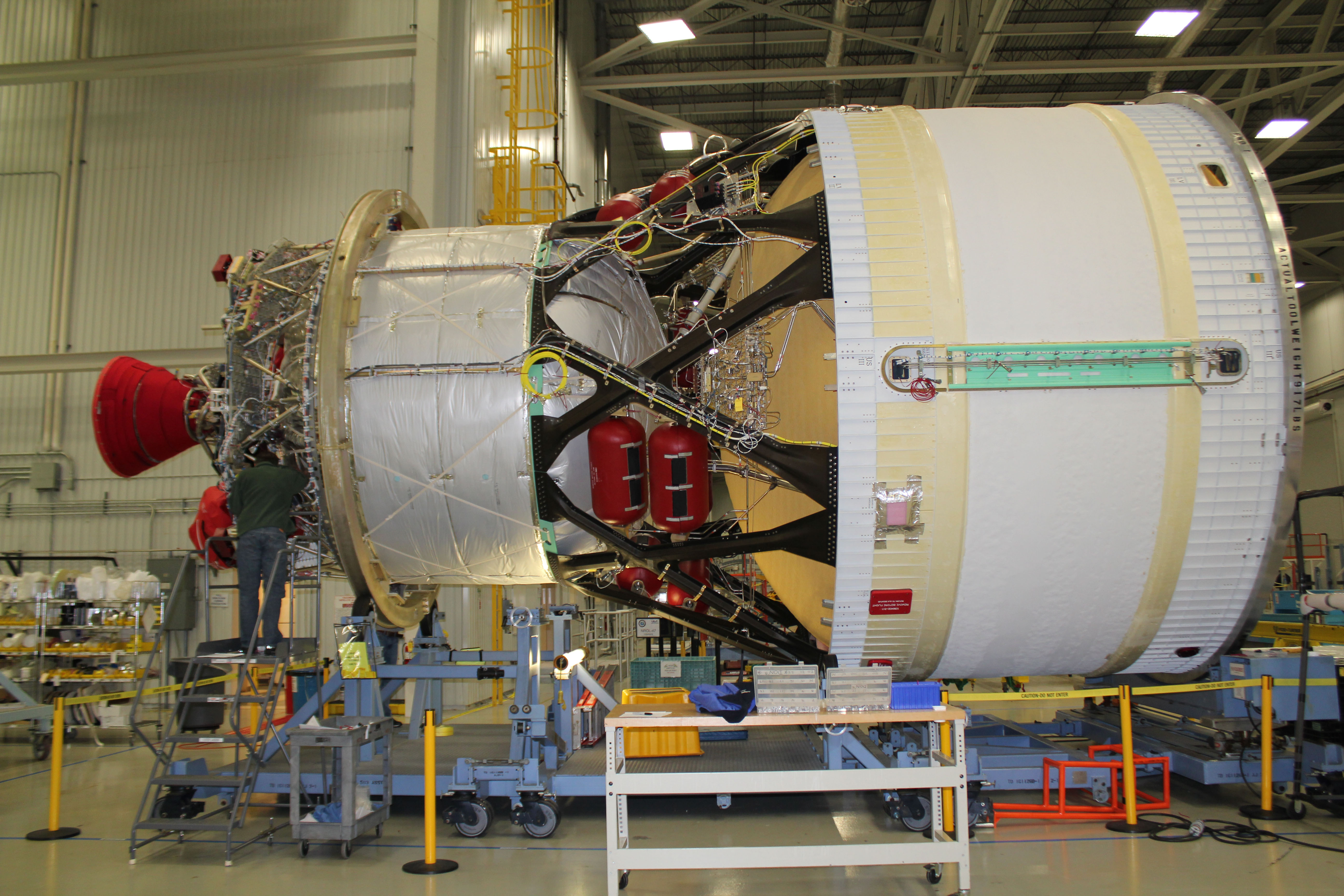
The Artemis I ICPS under construction

The Interim Cryogenic Propulsion Stage (ICPS) is the upper stage for the initial configuration of NASA's Space Launch System (SLS). It is a derivative of the 5-meter DCSS, with minimal modifications for SLS integration. Like the earlier DCSS, the ICPS is powered by one Aerojet Rocketdyne RL10 engine and generates 110.1 kilonewtons (24,800 pounds-force) of maximum thrust. Like all previous DCSS units, Artemis I used the RL10B-2 engine; however, Artemis II used, and IV will use, the RL10C-2. However, Artemis III will use a boilerplate ICPS, and as such, will have no actual ICPS engine on board.

The ICPS for the Artemis I mission was mated to the SLS launch stack on 6 July 2021. It performed as expected, providing the necessary thrust during the successful launch on 16 November 2022.

The ICPS is designed as a temporary solution. Prior to February 2026 it was slated to be replaced by the next-generation Exploration Upper Stage for the Artemis IV mission and beyond; however, it is now planned to be replaced by a commercial alternative, the Centaur V.
