= USA-293 =

GPS III satellite

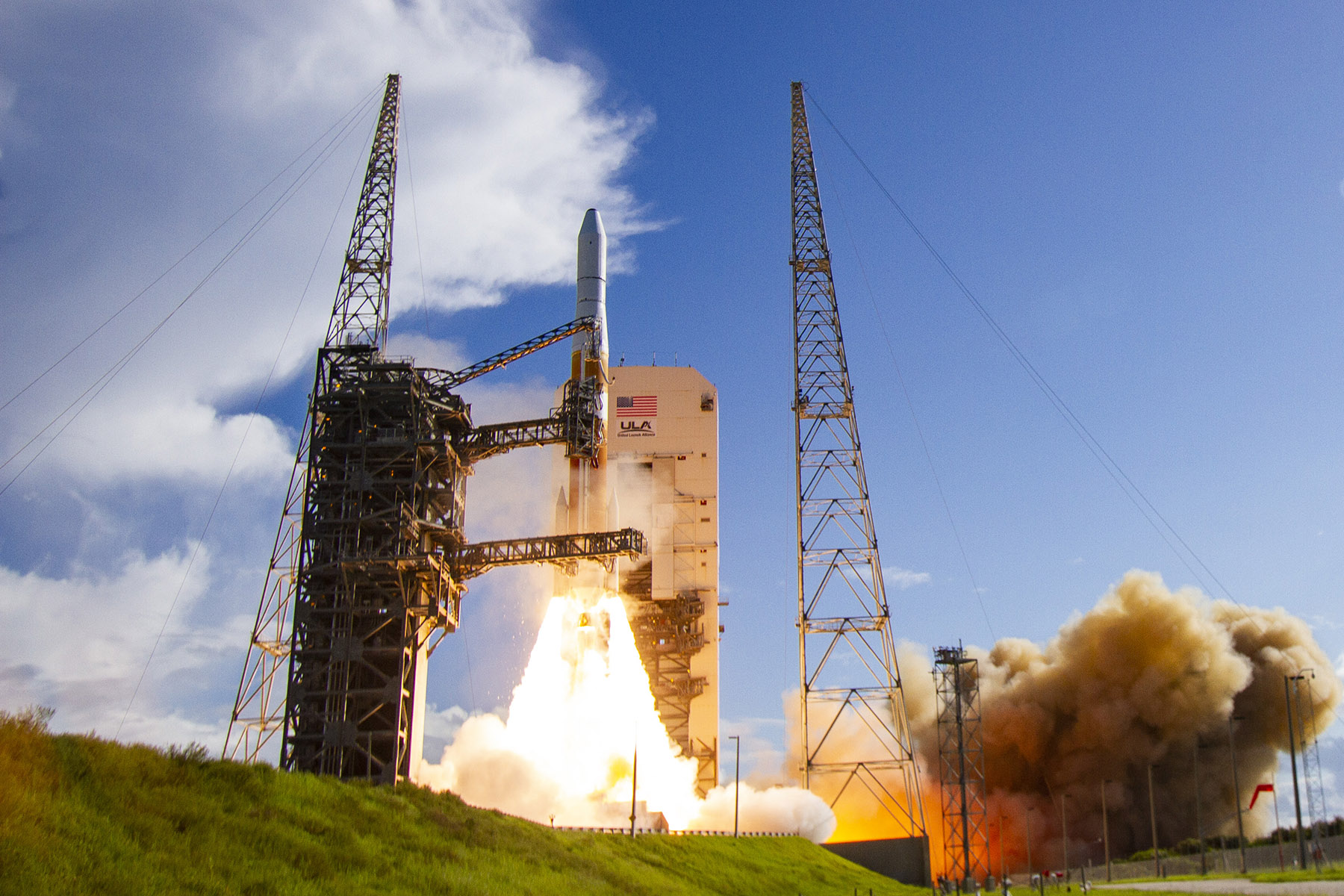
- Launch of GPS-III 02
- Names: Navstar 78; GPS-III SV02; Magellan
- Mission type: Navigation
- Operator: USAF
- COSPAR ID: 2019-056A
- SATCAT no.: 44506
- Mission duration: 15 years (planned)

Spacecraft properties
- Spacecraft: GPS-III SV02
- Spacecraft type: GPS Block III
- Bus: A2100M
- Manufacturer: Lockheed Martin
- Launch mass: 3680 kg
- Power: watts

Start of mission
- Launch date: 22 August 2019, 13:06 UTC
- Rocket: Delta IV Medium (4,2) (D-384)
- Launch site: Cape Canaveral, SLC-37
- Contractor: United Launch Alliance

Orbital parameters
- Reference system: Geocentric orbit
- Regime: Medium Earth orbit (Semi-synchronous orbit)
- Perigee altitude: 20,157 km (12,525 mi)
- Apogee altitude: 20,221 km (12,565 mi)
- Inclination: 55.40°
- Period: 718.0 minutes

USA-293, also known as GPS-III SV02 or Magellan, is a United States navigation satellite which forms part of the Global Positioning System. It was the second GPS Block III satellite to be launched.

== Satellite ==
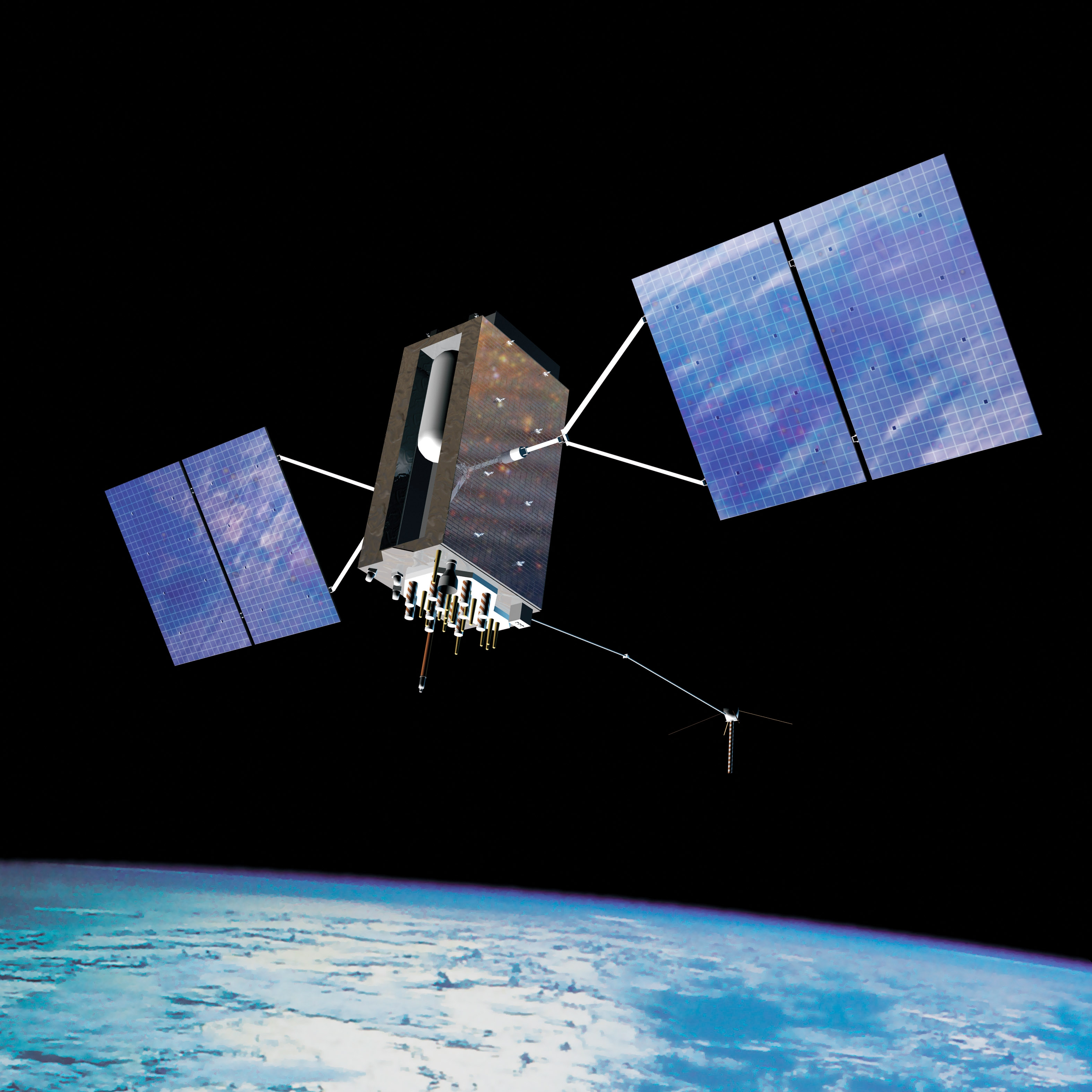
Artist's rendering of GPS-III satellite in orbit

SV02 is the second GPS Block III satellite to be launched. Ordered in 2008, technical delays to the first satellite in the program, SV01, pushed launch back to 2019.

The spacecraft is built on the Lockheed Martin A2100 satellite bus, and weighs 3,680 kg (8,110 lb).

USA-293 was given the nickname Magellan, after explorer Ferdinand Magellan.

== Launch ==
USA-293 was launched by United Launch Alliance on 22 August 2019 at 13:06 UTC atop a Delta IV Medium. The launch was the final flight of the single-core Delta IV. The launch took place from Cape Canaveral Space Launch Complex 37, and deployed USA-293 directly into a semi-synchronous orbit.

== Orbit ==
As of 2021, USA-293 was in a 55.4 degree inclination orbit with a perigee of 20,157 kilometres (12,525 mi) and an apogee of 20,221 kilometres (12,565 mi).

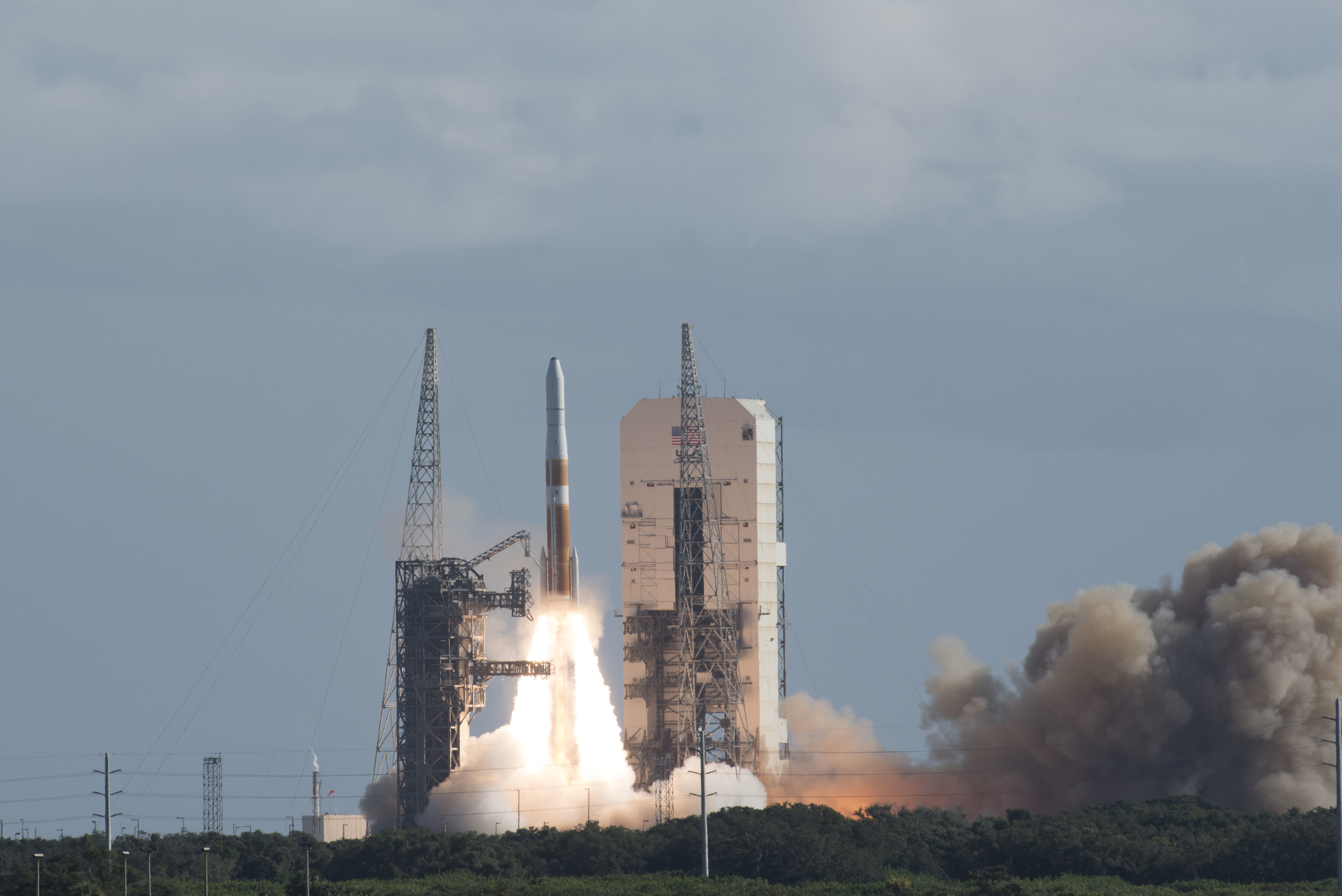
GPS-III SV02 is launched on a Delta IV
