= Delta IV =

Retired expendable launch system in the Delta rocket family

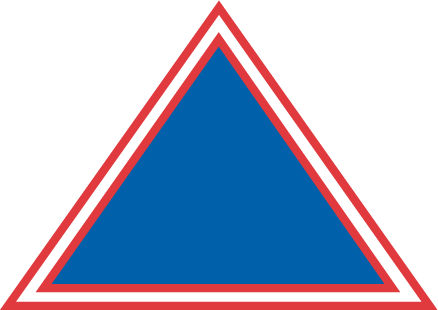

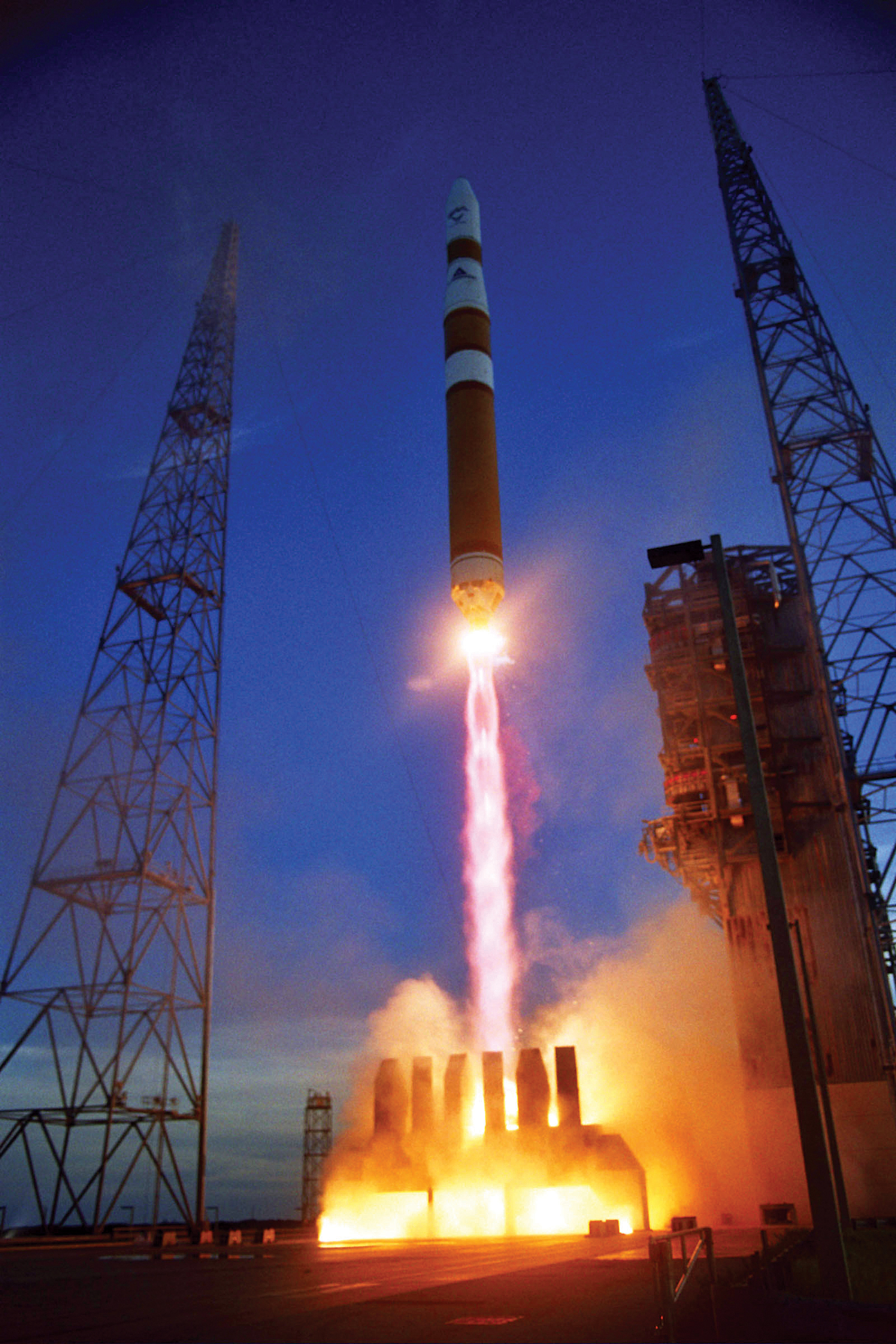
- Delta IV Medium launch carrying DSCS III-B6.
- Function: Orbital launch vehicle
- Manufacturer: United Launch Alliance
- Country of origin: United States
- Cost per launch: US$164+ million

Size
- Height: 63–70.7 m (207–232 ft)
- Diameter: 5.1 m (17 ft)
- Mass: 249,500–733,400 kg (550,100–1,616,900 lb)
- Stages: 2

Capacity

Payload to LEO
- Altitude: 407 km (253 mi)
- Orbital inclination: 51.6°
- Mass: 11,470–28,790 kg (25,290–63,470 lb)

Payload to GTO
- Mass: 4,440–14,220 kg (9,790–31,350 lb)

Associated rockets
- Family: Delta (rocket family)
- Comparable: Atlas V; Falcon 9; H-IIA; Long March 5; LVM3; Proton-M

Launch history
- Status: Retired
- Launch sites: Cape Canaveral, SLC-37; Vandenberg, SLC-6
- Total launches: 45: Medium: 3; M+ (4,2): 15; M+ (5,2): 3; M+ (5,4): 8; Heavy: 16
- Success(es): 44: Medium: 3; M+ (4,2): 15; M+ (5,2): 3; M+ (5,4): 8; Heavy: 15
- Partial failure: 1 (Heavy Demo)
- First flight: Medium: November 20, 2002 (Eutelsat W5); Heavy: December 21, 2004 (USA-181)
- Last flight: Medium: August 22, 2019 (USA-293/GPS III-2); Heavy: April 9, 2024 (NROL-70)
- Carries passengers or cargo: GOES; GPS Block IIF; NRO classified payloads; WGS; Exploration Flight Test 1; Parker Solar Probe

Boosters (Medium+) – GEM 60
- No. boosters: 2 (Note: Medium+ (4,2) and Medium+ (5,2)) or 4 (Note: Medium+ (5,4))
- Height: 13.2 m (518 in)
- Diameter: 1.5 m (60 in)
- Empty mass: 3,721 kg (8,203 lb)
- Gross mass: 33,650 kg (74,185 lb)
- Propellant mass: 29,698 kg (65,472 lb)
- Maximum thrust: 879 kN (197,500 lbf)
- Specific impulse: SL: 245 s (2.40 km/s)
- Burn time: 90.8 seconds
- Propellant: AP / HTPB / Al

First stage – CBC
- Height: 40.8 m (134 ft)
- Diameter: 5.1 m (17 ft)
- Empty mass: 26,760 kg (59,000 lb)
- Gross mass: 226,400 kg (499,100 lb)
- Powered by: 1 × RS-68
- Maximum thrust: SL: 3,140 kN (705,000 lbf)
- Specific impulse: SL: 360 s (3.5 km/s) vac: 412 s (4.04 km/s)
- Burn time: 246 seconds (Medium core/Heavy booster); 334 seconds (Heavy core)
- Propellant: LH_{2} / LOX

Second stage – DCSS
- Height: 12 m (39 ft)
- Diameter: 4 m: 4 m (13 ft); 5 m: 5.1 m (17 ft)
- Empty mass: 4 m: 2,850 kg (6,280 lb); 5 m: 3,490 kg (7,690 lb)
- Gross mass: 4 m: 24,170 kg (53,290 lb); 5 m: 30,710 kg (67,700 lb)
- Powered by: 1 × RL10-B-2
- Maximum thrust: 110 kN (25,000 lbf)
- Specific impulse: 462 s (4.53 km/s)
- Burn time: 4 m: 850 seconds; 5 m: 1,125 seconds
- Propellant: LH_{2} / LOX

Delta IV was a group of five expendable launch systems in the Delta rocket family. It flew 45 missions from 2002 to 2024. Originally designed by Boeing's Defense, Space and Security division for the Evolved Expendable Launch Vehicle (EELV) program, the Delta IV became a United Launch Alliance (ULA) product in 2006. The Delta IV was primarily a launch vehicle for military payloads for the United States Air Force (USAF), but was also used to launch a number of United States government non-military payloads and a single commercial satellite.

The Delta IV had two main versions, which allowed the family to cover a range of payload sizes and masses: Medium, which had four configurations, and Heavy. The final flight of a Medium configuration occurred in 2019. The final flight of Heavy was in April 2024.

Delta IV vehicles were built in the ULA facility in Decatur, Alabama. Final assembly was completed at the launch site by ULA: at the horizontal integration facility for launches from SLC-37B at Cape Canaveral in Florida and in a similar facility for launches from SLC-6 at Vandenberg in California.

== History ==
The latest evolutionary development of the Delta rocket family, the Delta IV was introduced to meet the requirements of the USAF's EELV program, now known as National Security Space Launch (NSSL) program. While the Delta IV retains the name of the Delta family of rockets, major changes were incorporated, the most significant being the switch from kerosene to liquid hydrogen fuel with new tankage and a new engine required.

During the Delta IV's development, a small variant was considered. This would have featured the Delta II second stage, an optional Thiokol Star 48B third stage, and the Delta II payload fairing, all atop a single Common Booster Core (CBC). The Small variant was dropped by 1999.

In 2002, the Delta IV was first launched, with the RS-68 becoming the first large liquid-propellant rocket engine designed in the United States since the Space Shuttle main engine (SSME) in the 1970s.

The L3 Technologies Redundant Inertial Flight Control Assembly (RIFCA) guidance system originally used on the Delta IV was common to that carried on the Delta II, although the software was different because of the differences between the Delta II and Delta IV. The RIFCA featured six ring laser gyroscopes and six accelerometers, to provide a higher degree of reliability.

Boeing initially intended to market Delta IV commercial launch services. However, the Delta IV entered the space launch market when global capacity was already much higher than demand. Furthermore, as an unproven design it had difficulty finding a market in commercial launches, and Delta IV launch costs were higher than comparable vehicles of the same era. In 2003, Boeing pulled the Delta IV from the commercial market, citing low demand and high costs. In 2005, Boeing stated that it sought to return the Delta IV to commercial service. Ultimately, with the exception of the first launch, which carried the Eutelsat W5 commercial communications satellite, all Delta IV launches were paid for by the US government.

As of 2009, the USAF funded Delta IV EELV engineering, integration, and infrastructure work through contracts with Boeing Launch Services (BLS). On August 8, 2008, the USAF Space and Missile Systems Center increased the "cost plus award fee" contract with BLS for US$1.656 billion to extend the period of performance through the September 30, 2008 (FY09). In addition, a US$557.1 million option was added to cover FY10.

In February 2010, naturalized citizen Dongfan Chung, an engineer working with Boeing, became the first person convicted under the Economic Espionage Act of 1996. Chung passed on classified information on designs including the Delta IV rocket to China and was sentenced to 15 years.

=== RS-68A booster engine upgrade ===
The possibility of a higher performance Delta IV was first proposed in a 2006 RAND Corporation study of national security launch requirements out to 2020. A single National Reconnaissance Office (NRO) payload required an increase in the lift capability of the Delta IV Heavy. Lift capacity was increased by developing the higher-performance RS-68A engine, which first flew on June 29, 2012. ULA phased out the baseline RS-68 engine with the launch of Delta flight 371 on March 25, 2015. All following launches used the RS-68A, and the engine's higher thrust allowed the use of a single standardized CBC design for all Delta IV Medium and M+ versions. This upgrade reduced cost and increased flexibility, since any standardized CBC could be configured for zero, two, or four solid-propellant rocket boosters. However, the new CBC led to a slight performance loss for most medium configurations. The Delta IV Heavy required non-standard CBCs for the core and boosters.

Version	Fairing	CBCs	SRBs	With original RS-68			After RS68A upgrade		
Version	Fairing	CBCs	SRBs	Payload to LEO	Payload to GTO	Launches	Payload to LEO	Payload to GTO	Launches
Medium	4 m	1	0	8,800 kg	4,540 kg	3	8,510 kg	4,440 kg	0
M+ (4,2)	4 m	1	2	11,920 kg	6,270 kg	13	12,000 kg	6,390 kg	2
M+ (5,2)	5 m	1	2	10,580 kg	5,430 kg	1	10,220 kg	5,490 kg	2
M+ (5,4)	5 m	1	4	13,450 kg	7,430 kg	4	12,820 kg	7,300 kg	4
Heavy	5 m	3	0	22,980 kg	13,400 kg	7	25,980 kg	14,220 kg	9

Masses include a Payload Attach Fitting (240 kg to 1,221 kg depending on payload).

=== Proposed upgrades that were not implemented ===
Possible future upgrades for the Delta IV included adding extra strap-on solid motors, higher-thrust main engines, lighter materials, higher-thrust second stages, more (up to eight) strap-on CBCs, and a cryogenic propellant cross feed from strap on boosters to the common core.

At one point, NASA planned to use Delta IV or Atlas V to launch the proposed Orbital Space Plane, which eventually became the Crew Exploration Vehicle and then the Orion. Orion was intended to fly on the Ares I launch vehicle, then the Space Launch System after Ares I was cancelled.

In 2009, The Aerospace Corporation reported on NASA results of a study to determine the feasibility of modifying Delta IV to be crew-rated for use in NASA human spaceflight missions. According to Aviation Week & Space Technology the study, "found that a Delta IV heavy [...] could meet NASA's requirements for getting humans to low Earth orbit".

A proposed upgrade to the Delta IV family was the addition of extra solid motors. The Medium+ (4,4) would have used existing mount points to pair the four GEM 60s of the M+ (5,4) with the upper stage and fairing of the (4,2). An M+ (4,4) would have had a GTO payload of 7,500 kg (16,500 lb), a LEO payload of 14,800 kg (32,600 lb), and could have been available within 36 months of the first order. It was also considered to add extra GEM 60s to the M+ (5,4), which would have required adding extra attachment points, structural changes to cope with the different flight loads, and launch pad and infrastructure changes. The Medium+ (5,6) and (5,8) would have flown with six and eight SRBs respectively, for a maximum of up to 9,200 kg (20,300 lb) to GTO with the M+ (5,8). The Medium+ (5,6) and (5,8) could have been available within 48 months of the first order.

=== Retirement and replacement ===
ULA was formed in December 2006 as a joint venture between Boeing and Lockheed Martin Space, inheriting the Atlas rocket family from Lockheed Martin and the Delta rocket family from Boeing. The Atlas V offered better performance than the Delta IV Medium at a lower cost, and in March 2015 ULA announced plans to retire the Delta IV Medium by 2018.

In 2014, ULA also began development of the Vulcan Centaur to replace both the Atlas and Delta families. The Vulcan's first stage shares design heritage with the Delta IV's Common Booster Core and is manufactured in the same Decatur, Alabama, facility using much of the same equipment, but with a diameter about 0.3 meters (1 ft) larger. It is powered by two BE-4 methane-fueled engines developed by Blue Origin. Compared with the liquid hydrogen used on the Delta IV, methane is denser and has a higher boiling point, allowing for smaller and lighter fuel tanks.

A single-core Vulcan Centaur with six SRBs delivers heavy-lift capabilities comparable to the larger and more expensive three-core Delta IV Heavy. With this configuration, the Vulcan Centaur can lift 27,200 kilograms (60,000 lb) to low Earth orbit (LEO), surpassing the Atlas V's maximum of 18,850 kg (41,560 lb) and approaching the Delta IV Heavy's 28,790 kg (63,470 lb) capacity.

The Vulcan Centaur was originally projected to enter service in 2023, but its first launch took place on January 8, 2024. The final Delta IV Medium launch (in a M+ 4,2 configuration) occurred on August 22, 2019, carrying a GPS III-2 satellite, USA-293, and the final Delta IV Heavy launch was on April 9, 2024, with the NROL-70 mission.

== Delta IV Medium ==
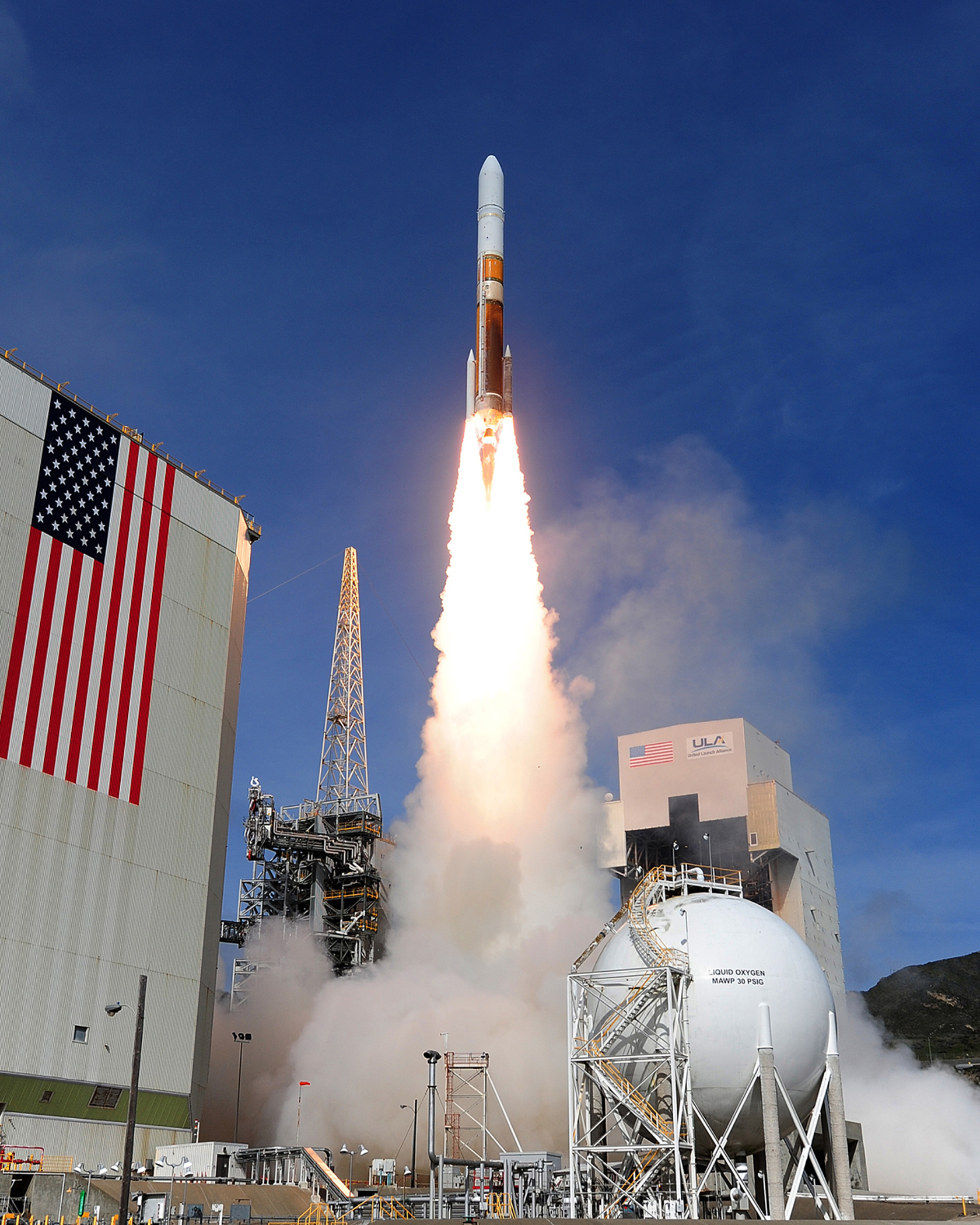
The first launch of the Medium+ (5,2) configuration in 2012.

The Delta IV Medium (also referred to as single stick) was offered in four configurations: Medium, Medium+ (4,2), Medium+ (5,2), and Medium+ (5,4).

The Delta IV Medium (Delta 9040) was the baseline configuration. It featured a single Common Booster Core (CBC) and a 4-meter (13 ft) Delta Cryogenic Second Stage (DCSS), derived from the Delta III design but with enlarged propellant tanks. Because the CBC was 5 meters (16 ft) in diameter, a tapered interstage was used to transition to the smaller second stage. The vehicle reused the Delta III payload fairing and was capable of placing 4,200 kilograms (9,300 lb) into geostationary transfer orbit (GTO). From Cape Canaveral, GTO is 1,804 meters per second (5,920 ft/s) short of geostationary orbit (GEO). Performance figures exclude the mass of the payload fairing and payload attach fittings.

The Delta IV Medium+ (4,2) (Delta 9240) used the same CBC and 4-meter (13 ft) DCSS as the Medium, but added two Orbital ATK-built GEM 60 solid rocket boosters (SRBs), increasing payload capacity to GTO to 6,150 kilograms (13,560 lb).

The Delta IV Medium+ (5,2) (Delta 9250) retained the two GEM 60 SRBs of the Medium+ (4,2), but used a larger 5-meter (16 ft) DCSS and a 5-meter (16 ft) payload fairing, allowing it to accommodate larger payloads. Due to the added mass of the larger fairing and second stage, payload to GTO was reduced to 5,072 kilograms (11,182 lb).

The Delta IV Medium+ (5,4) (Delta 9450) used the same 5-meter (16 ft) DCSS and payload fairing of the Medium+ (5,2), but used four GEM 60 SRBs instead of two, increasing payload capacity to GTO to 6,882 kilograms (15,172 lb).

== Delta IV Heavy ==
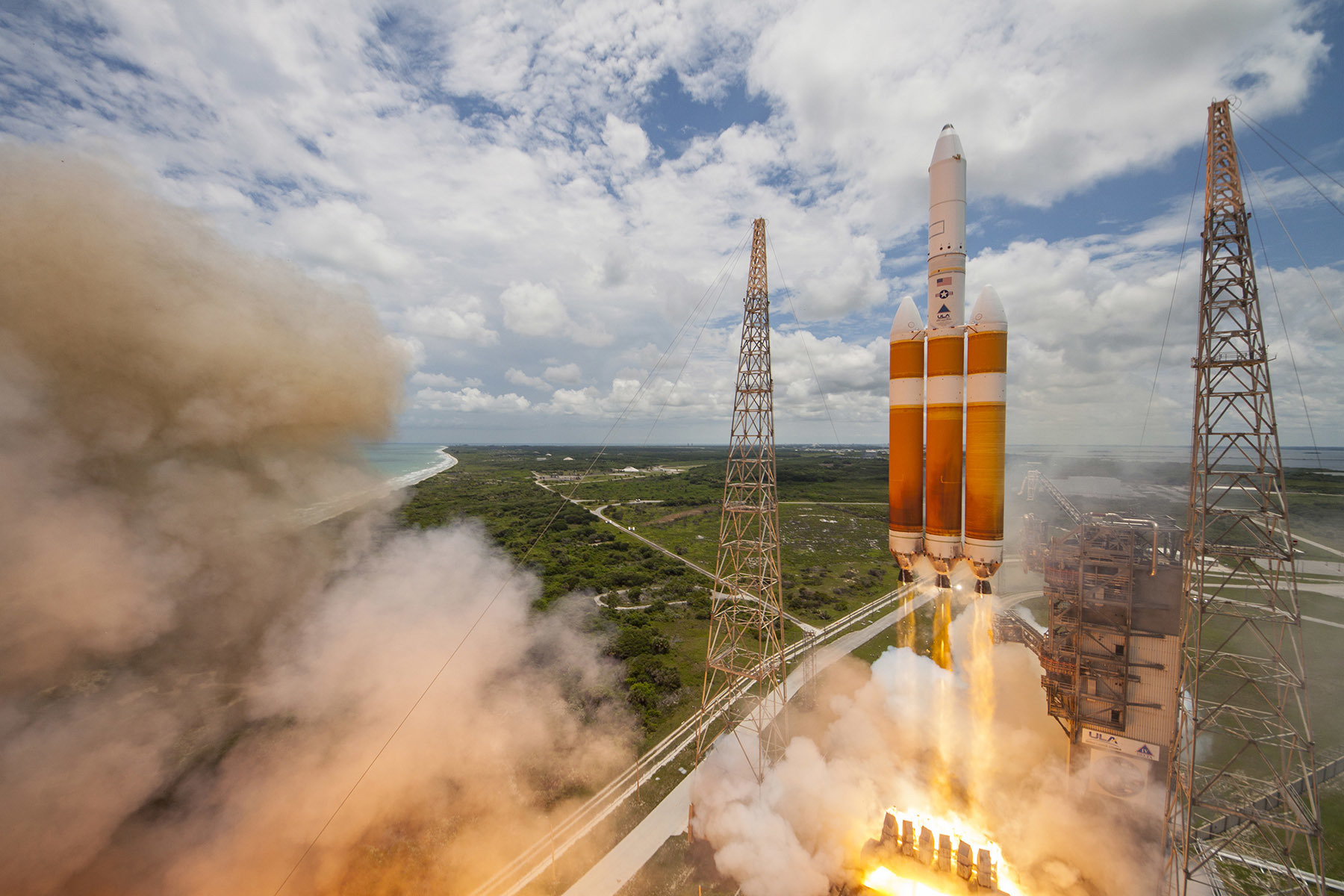
Delta IV Heavy launching

The Delta IV Heavy (Delta 9250H) combined a 5-meter (16 ft) Delta Cryogenic Second Stage with two additional Common Booster Cores (CBCs) strapped to the central core. The side CBCs separated earlier in flight than the center core. Starting in 2007, a longer composite fairing became standard, with optional aluminum isogrid or trisector fairings also available. With the extended fairing, the vehicle stood over 62 meters (203 ft) tall.

== Vehicle description ==
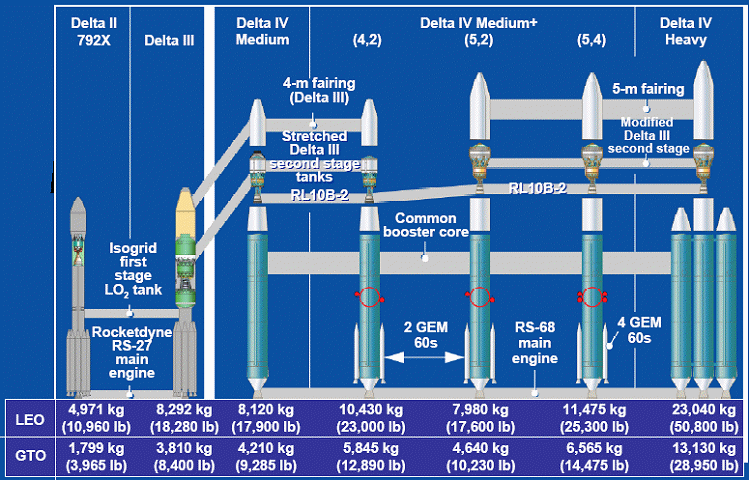
Delta IV evolution

=== Common Booster Core ===
Each Delta IV consists of at least one Common Booster Core (CBC). Each CBC was powered by one Aerojet Rocketdyne RS-68 engine, which burns liquid hydrogen and liquid oxygen.

On flights of the Medium, the RS-68 ran at 102% rated thrust for the first few minutes of flight, and then throttled down to 58% rated thrust before main engine cutoff. On the Heavy, the main CBC's engine throttles down to 58% rated thrust around 50 seconds after liftoff, while the strap-on CBCs remain at 102%. This conserves propellant and allows the main CBC to burn after booster separation. After the strap-on CBCs separate, the main CBC's engine again throttles up to 102% before throttling back down to 58% prior to main engine cutoff.

The RS-68 engine was mounted to the lower thrust structure of the CBC by a four-legged (quadrapod) thrust frame and enclosed in a protective composite conical thermal shield. Above the thrust structure was an aluminum isogrid (a grid pattern machined out of the inside of the tank to reduce weight) liquid hydrogen tank, followed by a composite cylinder called the centerbody, an aluminum isogrid liquid oxygen tank, and a forward skirt. Along the back of the CBC was a cable tunnel to hold electrical and signal lines, and a feedline to carry the liquid oxygen to the RS-68 from the tank. The CBC was a constant 5-meter (16 ft) diameter.

=== Delta Cryogenic Second Stage ===
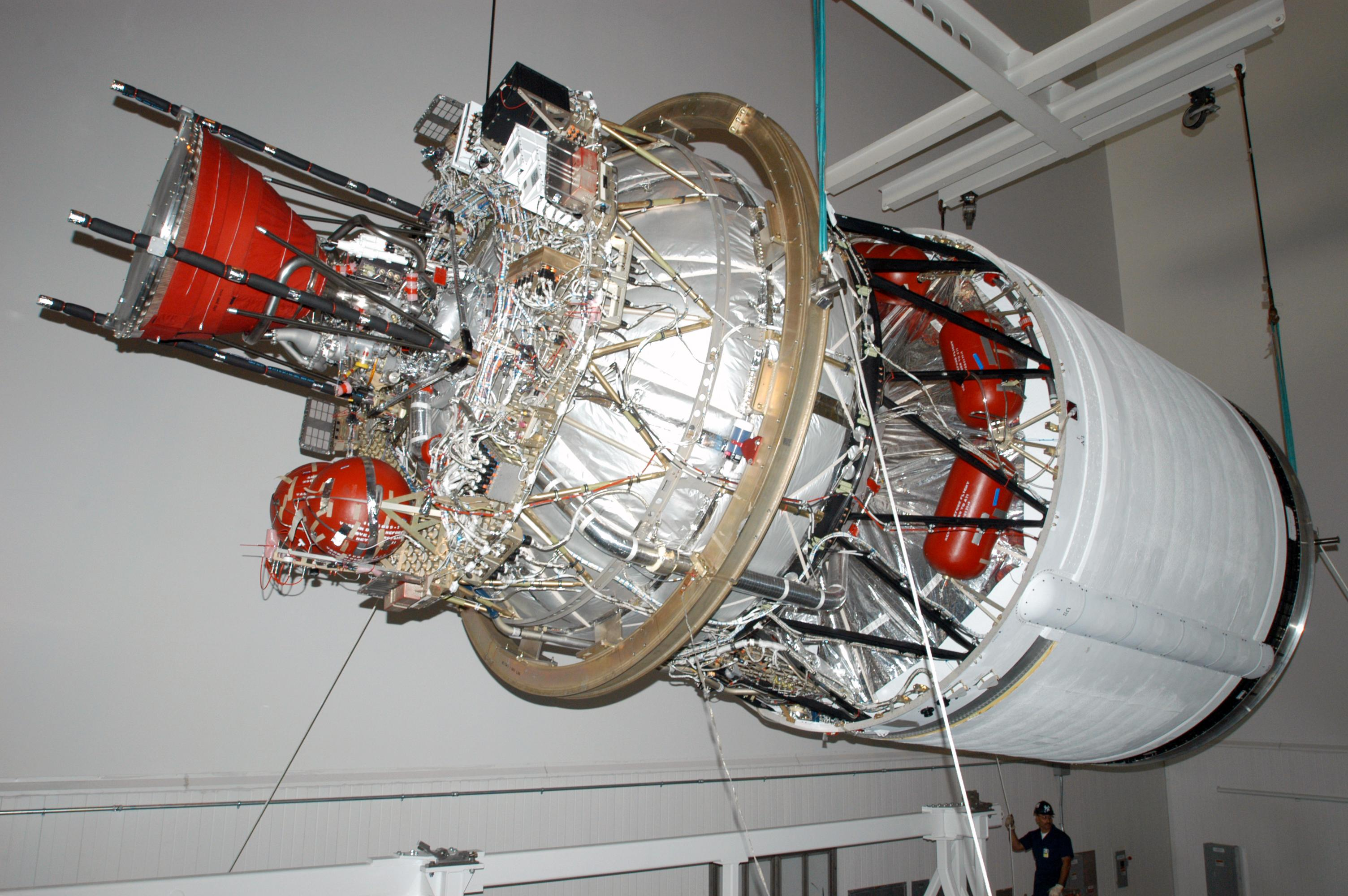
Delta IV 4-meter Cryogenic Second Stage

The upper stage of the Delta IV was the Delta Cryogenic Second Stage (DCSS). The DCSS was based on the Delta III upper stage but has increased propellant capacity. Two versions have been produced: a 4-meter (13 ft) diameter DCSS that was retired with the Delta IV Medium and a 5-meter (16 ft) diameter DCSS that remained in service with the Delta IV Heavy. The 4-meter diameter version lengthened both Delta III propellant tanks, while the 5-meter version had an extended diameter liquid hydrogen tank and a further lengthened liquid oxygen tank. Regardless of the diameter, each DCSS was powered by one RL10B-2 engine, with an extendable carbon-carbon nozzle to improve specific impulse. Two different interstages were used to mate the first stage and DCSS. A tapering interstage that narrowed down from 5 to 4-meter diameter was used to mate the 4-meter DCSS to the CBC, while a cylindrical interstage was used to mate the 5-meter DCSS. Both interstages were built from composites and enclosed the liquid oxygen tank, with the larger liquid hydrogen tank making up part of the vehicle's outer mold line.

=== Launch sites ===
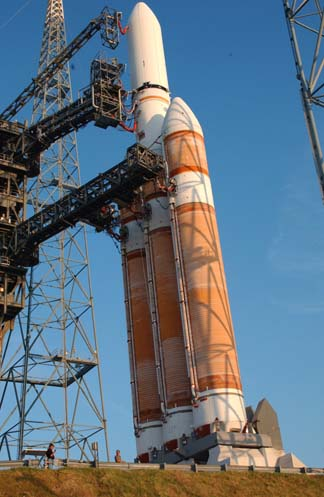
First Delta IV Heavy with three CBCs prior to launch

Delta IV launched from either of two rocket launch complexes. Launches on the East coast of the United States used Space Launch Complex 37 (SLC-37) at the Cape Canaveral Air Force Station. On the West coast, polar-orbit and high-inclination launches used Vandenberg Space Force Base's Space Launch Complex 6 (SLC-6).

Launch facilities at both sites were similar. A Horizontal Integration Facility (HIF) was situated some distance from the pad. Delta IV CBCs and second stages to be mated and tested in the HIF before they were moved to the pad. The partial horizontal rocket assembly of the Delta IV was somewhat similar to the Soyuz launch vehicle, which is completely assembled horizontally. The Space Shuttles, the past Saturn launch vehicles, and the Space Launch System were assembled and rolled out to the launch pad entirely vertically.

Movement of the Delta IVs among the various facilities at the pad was facilitated by rubber-tired Elevating Platform Transporters (EPTs) and various transport jigs. Diesel engine EPTs were used for moving the vehicles from the HIF to the pad, while electric EPTs were used in the HIF, where precision of movement was important.

The basic launchpad structure includes a flame trench to direct the engine plume away from the rocket, lightning protection, and propellant storage. In the case of Delta IV, the vehicle was completed on the launch pad inside a building. This Mobile Service Tower (MST) provides service access to the rocket and protection from the weather and was rolled away from the rocket on launch day. A crane at the top of the MST lifts the encapsulated payload to the vehicle and also attached the GEM 60 solid motors for Delta IV Medium launches. The MST was rolled away from the rocket several hours before launch. At Vandenberg, the launch pad also had a Mobile Assembly Shelter (MAS), which completely enclosed the vehicle; at CCAFS, the vehicle was partly exposed near its bottom.

Beside the vehicle was a Fixed Umbilical Tower (FUT), which has two (VSFB) or three (CCAFS) swing arms. These arms carry telemetry signals, electrical power, hydraulic fluid, environmental control air flow, and other support functions to the vehicle through umbilical lines. The swing arms retract at T-0 seconds once the vehicle was committed to launch.

Under the vehicle was a Launch Table, with six Tail Service Masts (TSMs), two for each CBC. The Launch Table supports the vehicle on the pad, and the TSMs provide further support and fueling functions for the CBCs. The vehicle was mounted to the Launch Table by a Launch Mate Unit (LMU), which was attached to the vehicle by bolts that sever at launch. Behind the Launch Table was a Fixed Pad Erector (FPE), which used two long-stroke hydraulic pistons to raise the vehicle to the vertical position after being rolled to the pad from the HIF. Beneath the Launch Table was a flame duct, which deflects the rocket's exhaust away from the rocket or facilities.

=== Vehicle processing ===
Delta IV CBCs and DCSSs were assembled at ULA's factory in Decatur, Alabama. They were then loaded onto the R/S RocketShip, a roll-on/roll-off cargo vessel, and shipped to either launch pad. There, they were offloaded and rolled into a HIF. For Delta IV Medium launches, the CBC and DCSS were mated in the HIF. For Delta IV Heavy launches, the port and starboard strap-on CBCs were also mated in the HIF.

Various tests were performed, and then the vehicle was rolled horizontally to the pad, where the Fixed Pad Erector (FPE) was used to raise the vehicle to the vertical position. At this time, the GEM 60 solid motors, if any were required, were rolled to the pad and attached to the vehicle. After further testing, the payload (which has already been enclosed in its fairing) was transported to the pad, hoisted into the MST by a crane, and attached to the vehicle. Finally, on launch day, the MST was rolled away from the vehicle, and the vehicle was then ready for launch.

== Launch history ==
The 45 Delta IV launches consist of 3 Delta IV Medium, 36 Medium+, and 16 Heavy.

No.	Date/Time (UTC)	Type	Serial no.	Start place	Payload	Payload type	Orbit	Outcome	Remarks
1	November 20, 2002; 22:39	Medium+ (4,2)	293	Cape Canaveral, SLC-37B	Eutelsat W5	Commercial communications satellite	GTO	Success	First Delta IV launch.
2	2003-03-11; 00:59	Medium	296	Cape Canaveral, SLC-37B	USA-167 (DSCS-3 A3)	Military communications satellite	GTO	Success	First Delta IV Medium launch. First USAF EELV mission
3	2003-08-29; 23:13	Medium	301	Cape Canaveral, SLC-37B	USA-170 (DSCS-3 B6)	Military communications satellite	GTO	Success	
4	2004-12-21; 21:50	Heavy	310	Cape Canaveral, SLC-37B	DemoSat / 3CS-1 / 3CS-2	Demonstration payload	GSO (planned)	Partial failure	First Delta IV Heavy launch.; Premature cutoff of CBCs.; DemoSat reached incorrect orbit, 3 Corner Satellite (3CS) failed to reach orbit.
5	2006-05-24; 22:11	Medium+ (4,2)	315	Cape Canaveral, SLC-37B	GOES 13 (GOES-N)	Weather satellite	GTO	Success	
6	2006-06-28; 03:33	Medium+ (4,2)	317	Vandenberg, SLC-6	USA-184 (NROL-22)	Reconnaissance satellite	Molniya	Success	First Delta IV launch from Vandenberg.
7	2006-11-04; 13:53	Medium	320	Vandenberg, SLC-6	USA-192 (DMSP F17)	Military weather satellite	SSO	Success	First Delta IV launch into a LEO/SSO, last flight of Delta IV Medium.
8	2007-11-11; 01:50	Heavy	329	Cape Canaveral, SLC-37B	USA-197 (DSP-23)	Missile warning satellite	GSO	Success	First Delta IV launch contracted by United Launch Alliance. Launch delayed due to damage to launch pad caused by a liquid oxygen leak.
9	2009-01-18; 02:47	Heavy	337	Cape Canaveral, SLC-37B	USA-202 (NROL-26)	Reconnaissance satellite	GSO	Success	
10	2009-06-27; 22:51	Medium+ (4,2)	342	Cape Canaveral, SLC-37B	GOES 14 (GOES-O)	Weather satellite	GTO	Success	
11	2009-12-06; 01:47	Medium+ (5,4)	346	Cape Canaveral, SLC-37B	USA-211 (WGS-3)	Military communications satellite	GTO	Success	First Delta IV Medium+ (5,4) launch.
12	2010-03-04; 23:57	Medium+ (4,2)	348	Cape Canaveral, SLC-37B	GOES 15 (GOES-P)	Weather satellite	GTO	Success	
13	2010-05-28; 03:00	Medium+ (4,2)	349	Cape Canaveral, SLC-37B	USA-213 (GPS IIF-1)	Navigation Satellite	MEO	Success	
14	2010-11-21; 22:58	Heavy	351	Cape Canaveral, SLC-37B	USA-223 (NROL-32)	Reconnaissance satellite	GSO	Success	
15	2011-01-20; 21:10	Heavy	352	Vandenberg, SLC-6	USA-224 (NROL-49)	Reconnaissance satellite	LEO	Success	First Delta IV Heavy launch from Vandenberg.
16	2011-03-11; 23:38	Medium+ (4,2)	353	Cape Canaveral, SLC-37B	USA-227 (NROL-27)	Reconnaissance satellite	GTO	Success	
17	2011-07-16; 06:41	Medium+ (4,2)	355	Cape Canaveral, SLC-37B	USA-232 (GPS IIF-2)	Navigation Satellite	MEO	Success	
18	2012-01-20; 00:38	Medium+ (5,4)	358	Cape Canaveral, SLC-37B	USA-233 (WGS-4)	Military communications satellite	GTO	Success	
19	2012-04-03; 23:12	Medium+ (5,2)	359	Vandenberg, SLC-6	USA-234 (NROL-25)	Reconnaissance satellite	LEO	Success	First flight in the Medium+ (5,2) version.
20	2012-06-29; 13:15	Heavy	360	Cape Canaveral, SLC-37B	USA-237 (NROL-15)	Reconnaissance satellite	GSO	Success	First flight of the RS-68A engine.
21	2012-10-04; 12:10	Medium+ (4,2)	361	Cape Canaveral, SLC-37B	USA-239 (GPS IIF-3)	Navigation Satellite	MEO	Success	Upper stage (DCSS) anomaly caused by fuel leak, payload still reached planned orbit.
22	2013-05-25; 00:27	Medium+ (5,4)	362	Cape Canaveral, SLC-37B	USA-243 (WGS-5)	Military communications satellite	GTO	Success	
23	2013-08-08; 00:29	Medium+ (5,4)	363	Cape Canaveral, SLC-37B	USA-244 (WGS-6)	Military communications satellite	GTO	Success	
24	2013-08-28; 18:03	Heavy	364	Vandenberg, SLC-6	USA-245 (NROL-65)	Reconnaissance satellite	LEO	Success	
25	2014-02-21; 01:59	Medium+ (4,2)	365	Cape Canaveral, SLC-37B	USA-248 (GPS IIF-5)	Navigation Satellite	MEO	Success	
26	2014-05-17; 00:03	Medium+ (4,2)	366	Cape Canaveral, SLC-37B	USA-251 (GPS IIF-6)	Navigation Satellite	MEO	Success	
27	2014-07-28; 23:28	Medium+ (4,2)	368	Cape Canaveral, SLC-37B	AFSPC-4 (GSSAP #1/2 and ANGELS) (USA-253/254/255)	Space surveillance and technology demonstrator	GEO	Success	First use of secondary payload adapter on a Delta rocket.
28	2014-12-05; 12:05	Heavy	369	Cape Canaveral, SLC-37B	Orion MPCV EFT-1	Uncrewed Capsule Test Flight	MEO	Success	
29	2015-03-25; 18:36	Medium+ (4,2)	371	Cape Canaveral, SLC-37B	USA-260 (GPS IIF-9)	Navigation Satellite	MEO	Success	Final launch with baseline RS-68 engine.
30	2015-07-24; 00:07	Medium+ (5,4)	372	Cape Canaveral, SLC-37B	USA-263 (WGS-7)	Military communications satellite	GTO	Success	
31	2016-02-10; 11:40	Medium+ (5,2)	373	Vandenberg, SLC-6	USA-267 (NROL-45)	Reconnaissance satellite	LEO	Success	
32	2016-06-11; 17:51	Heavy	374	Cape Canaveral, SLC-37B	USA-268 (NROL-37)	Reconnaissance satellite	GSO	Success	
33	2016-08-19; 04:52	Medium+ (4,2)	375	Cape Canaveral, SLC-37B	AFSPC-6 (GSSAP #3/4) (USA-270/271)	Space surveillance	GEO	Success	
34	2016-12-07; 23:53	Medium+ (5,4)	376	Cape Canaveral, SLC-37B	USA-272 (WGS-8)	Military communications satellite	GTO	Success	
35	2017-03-19; 00:18	Medium+ (5,4)	377	Cape Canaveral, SLC-37B	USA-275 (WGS-9)	Military communications satellite	GTO	Success	
36	2018-01-12; 22:11	Medium+ (5,2)	379	Vandenberg, SLC-6	USA-281 (NROL-47)	Reconnaissance satellite	LEO	Success	Final flight of Delta IV M+ (5,2) variant.
37	2018-08-12; 07:31	Heavy	380	Cape Canaveral, SLC-37B	Parker Solar Probe	Solar Probe	Heliocentric	Success	First (and only) use of Delta IV Heavy with Star 48BV third stage (9255H).
38	2019-01-19; 19:10	Heavy	382	Vandenberg, SLC-6	USA-290 (NROL-71)	Reconnaissance satellite	LEO	Success	
39	2019-03-16; 00:26	Medium+ (5,4)	383	Cape Canaveral, SLC-37B	USA-291 (WGS-10)	Military communications satellite	GTO	Success	Final flight of Delta IV M+ (5,4) variant.
40	2019-08-22; 13:06	Medium+ (4,2)	384	Cape Canaveral, SLC-37B	USA-293 (GPS III-2)	Navigation Satellite	MEO	Success	Final flight of the Delta IV Medium and the Delta IV M+ (4,2) variant.
41	2020-12-11; 01:09	Heavy	385	Cape Canaveral, SLC-37B	USA-311 (NROL-44)	Reconnaissance satellite	GSO	Success	
42	2021-04-26; 20:47	Heavy	386	Vandenberg, SLC-6	USA 314 (NROL-82)	Reconnaissance satellite	LEO	Success	
43	2022-09-24; 22:25	Heavy	387	Vandenberg, SLC-6	USA-338 (NROL-91)	Reconnaissance satellite	LEO	Success	Final flight of Delta IV from VSFB
44	2023-06-22; 09:18	Heavy	388	Cape Canaveral, SLC-37B	USA-345 (NROL-68)	Reconnaissance satellite	GSO	Success	
45	2024-04-09; 16:53	Heavy	389	Cape Canaveral, SLC-37B	USA-353 (NROL-70)	Reconnaissance satellite	GSO	Success	Final flight of the Delta IV rocket and of the whole Delta rocket family.

=== Delta family launches by decade ===
- List of Thor and Delta launches (2000–2009)
- List of Thor and Delta launches (2010–2019)
- List of Thor and Delta launches (2020–2024)

=== Delta IV launches by configuration ===
- List of Delta IV launches (all variants, Medium and Heavy)
  - List of Delta IV Medium launches
  - List of Delta IV Heavy launches

=== Notable launches ===
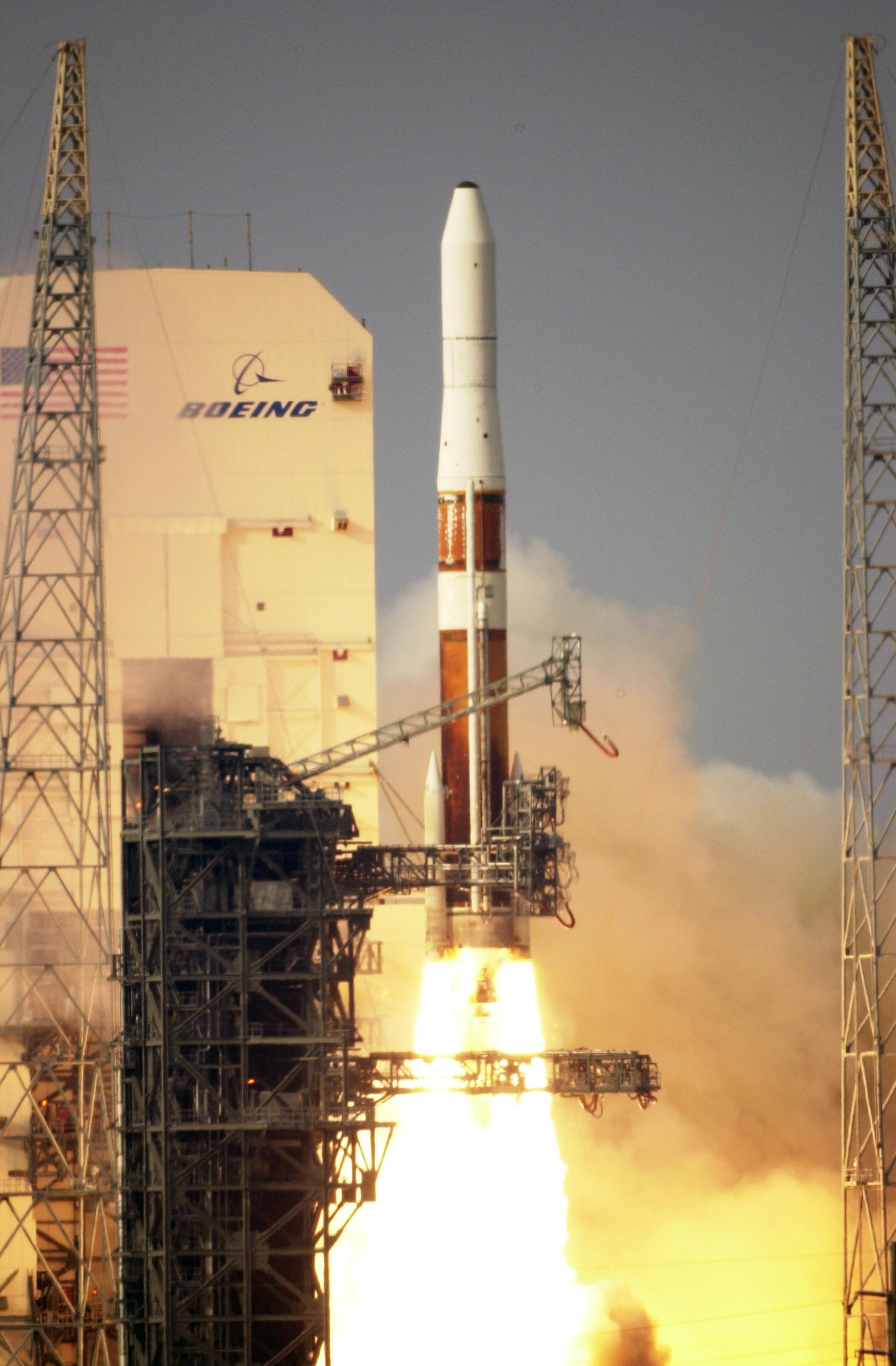
GOES-N launch on a Medium+ (4,2)

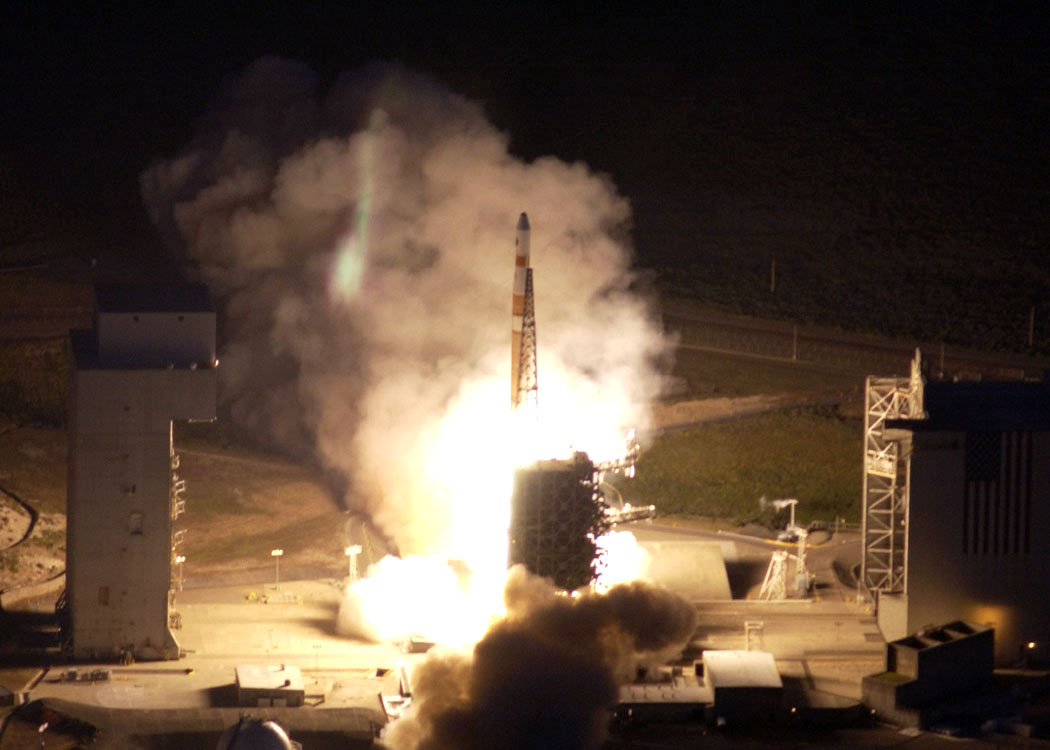
A unique aerial view of NROL-22 launch from SLC-6

The first payload launched with a Delta IV was the Eutelsat W5 communications satellite. A Medium+ (4,2) from Cape Canaveral carried the communications satellite into geostationary transfer orbit (GTO) on November 20, 2002.

Heavy Demo was the first launch of the Delta IV Heavy in December 2004 after significant delays due to bad weather. Due to cavitation in the propellant lines, sensors on all three CBCs registered depletion of propellant. The strap-on CBCs and then core CBC engines shut down prematurely, even though sufficient propellant remained to continue the burn as scheduled. The second stage attempted to compensate for the shutdown and burned until it ran out of propellant. This flight was a test launch carrying a payload of:

- DemoSat – 6020 kg; an aluminum cylinder filled with 60 brass rods – planned to be carried to GEO; however due to the sensor faults, the satellite did not reach this orbit.
- NanoSat-2, carried to low Earth orbit (LEO) – a set of two very small satellites of 24 and 21 kg, nicknamed Sparky and Ralphie – planned to orbit for one day. Given the under-burn, the two most likely did not reach a stable orbit.

NROL-22 was the first Delta IV launched from SLC-6 at Vandenberg Space Force Base (VSFB). It was launched aboard a Medium+ (4,2) in June 2006 carrying a classified satellite for the U.S. National Reconnaissance Office (NRO).

DSP-23 was the first launch of a valuable payload aboard a Delta IV Heavy. This was also the first Delta IV launch contracted by the United Launch Alliance, a joint venture between Boeing and Lockheed Martin. The main payload was the 23rd and final Defense Support Program missile-warning satellite, DSP-23. Launch from Cape Canaveral occurred on November 10, 2007.

NROL-26 was the first Delta IV Heavy EELV launch for the NRO. USA 202, a classified reconnaissance satellite, lifted off January 18, 2009.

NROL-32 was a Delta IV Heavy launch, carrying a satellite for NRO. The payload is speculated to be the largest satellite sent into space. After a delay from October 19, 2010, the rocket lifted off on November 21, 2010.

NROL-49 lifted off from Vandenberg AFB on January 20, 2011. It was the first Delta IV Heavy mission to be launched out of Vandenberg. This mission was for the NRO and its details are classified.

On October 4, 2012, a Delta IV M+ (4,2) experienced an anomaly in the upper stage's RL10B-2 engine which resulted in lower than expected thrust. While the vehicle had sufficient fuel margins to successfully place the payload, a GPS Block IIF satellite USA-239, into its targeted orbit, investigation into the glitch delayed subsequent Delta IV launches and the next Atlas V launch (AV-034) due to commonality between the engines used on both vehicles' upper stages. By December 2012, ULA had determined the cause of the anomaly to be a fuel leak (into the combustion chamber), and Delta IV launches resumed in May 2013. After two more successful launches, further investigation led to the delay of Delta flight 365 with the GPS IIF-5 satellite. Originally scheduled to launch in October 2013, the vehicle lifted off on February 21, 2014.

A Delta IV Heavy launched the Orion spacecraft on an uncrewed test flight, EFT-1, on December 5, 2014. The launch was originally planned for December 4, 2014, but high winds and valve issues caused the launch to be rescheduled for December 5, 2014.

On August 12, 2018, another Delta IV Heavy launched the Parker Solar Probe on a mission to explore or "touch" the outer corona of the Sun.

The second GPS Block III satellite was launched with the final Delta IV Medium+ (4,2) configuration rocket on August 22, 2019.

The final flight from Vandenberg of the Delta IV Heavy launched the NROL-91 mission in September 2022.

The final flight from Cape Canaveral of the Delta IV Heavy and of the Delta rocket family took place in April 2024 carrying the NROL-70 mission.

== See also ==
- Comparison of orbital launchers families
- Comparison of orbital launch systems
- Advanced Cryogenic Evolved Stage
- Expendable launch system
- List of launch vehicles
