= Air Force Space Command Space Operations Squadron =

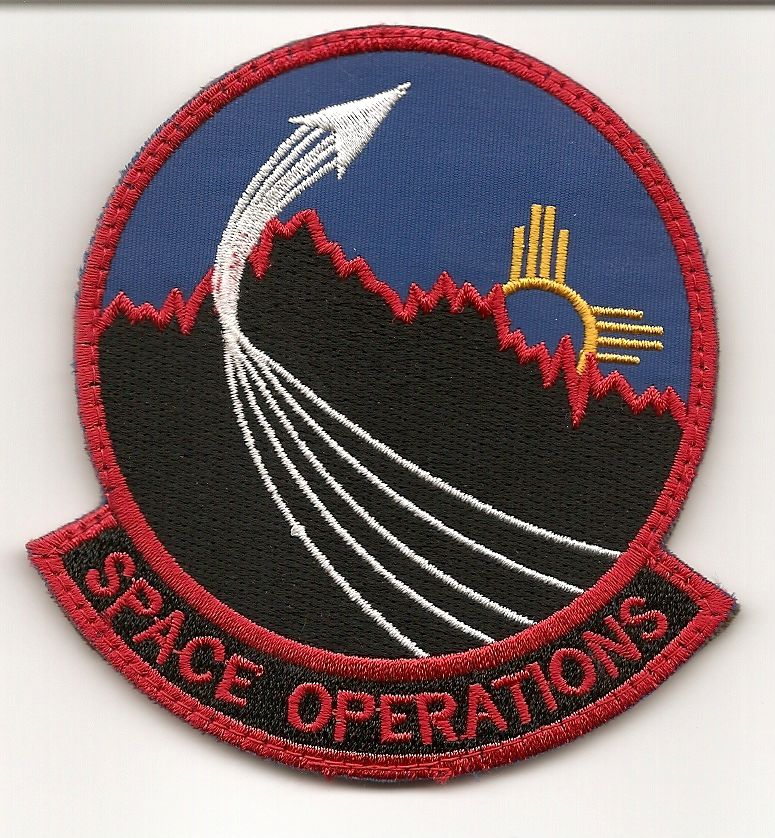
- AFSPC SOPS emblem
- Active: 1994 – present
- Country: United States
- Branch: United States Air Force
- Type: Space Operations
- Role: Combat Support
- Part of: AFSPC
- Garrison/HQ: Peterson AFB, Colorado

The Air Force Space Command Space Operations Squadron is a United States Air Force Air Force Space Command satellite operations unit located at Peterson AFB, Colorado.

== History ==
The unit was formed as the Air Force Space Command Space Operations Flight on 31 May 1994, and activated on 1 July 1994. The unit was later redesignated the Air Force Space Command Space Operations Squadron on 15 August 1998.

== Previous designations ==
- AFSPC Space Operations Squadron (15 August 1998 – present)
- AFSPC Space Operations Flight (31 May 1994 – 15 August 1998)

== Locations ==
- Peterson AFB, Colorado (1 July 1994 – present)

== Decorations ==
- Air Force Organizational Excellence Award
  - 1 March 2004 – 1 March 2006
  - 1 November 2000-31 October 2002
