= RS-68 =

Hydrogen-oxygen rocket engine for the Delta IV

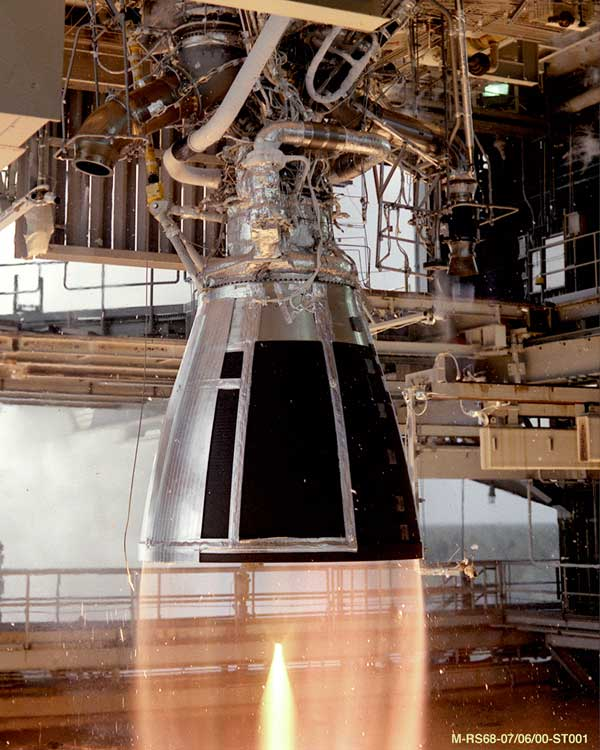
- An RS-68 engine undergoing hot-fire testing at NASA's Stennis Space Center during its developmental phase.
- Country of origin: United States
- First flight: 20 November 2002
- Last flight: 9 April 2024
- Designer: Rocketdyne
- Manufacturer: Rocketdyne (2002–2005); Pratt & Whitney Rocketdyne (2005–2013); Aerojet Rocketdyne (2013–2024)
- Application: First stage engine
- Associated LV: Delta IV · Delta IV Heavy
- Status: Retired

Liquid-fuel engine
- Propellant: LOX / LH_{2}
- Cycle: Gas-generator

Configuration
- Nozzle ratio: 21.5:1

Performance
- Thrust, sea-level: RS-68: 2,950 kN (660,000 lb_{f}); RS-68A: 3,137 kN (705,000 lb_{f})
- Thrust-to-weight ratio: RS-68: 45.3:1; RS-68A: 47.4:1
- Chamber pressure: 1,488 psi (10.26 MPa)
- Specific impulse, vacuum: RS-68: 410 s (4.0 km/s); RS-68A: 411.9 s (4.039 km/s)

Dimensions
- Length: 5.20 m (17.1 ft)
- Diameter: 2.43 m (8 ft 0 in)
- Dry mass: RS-68: 6,600 kg (14,560 lb); RS-68A: 6,740 kg (14,870 lb)

The RS-68 (Rocket System-68) was a liquid-fuel rocket engine that used liquid hydrogen (LH_{2}) and liquid oxygen (LOX) as propellants in a gas-generator cycle. It was the largest hydrogen-fueled rocket engine ever flown.

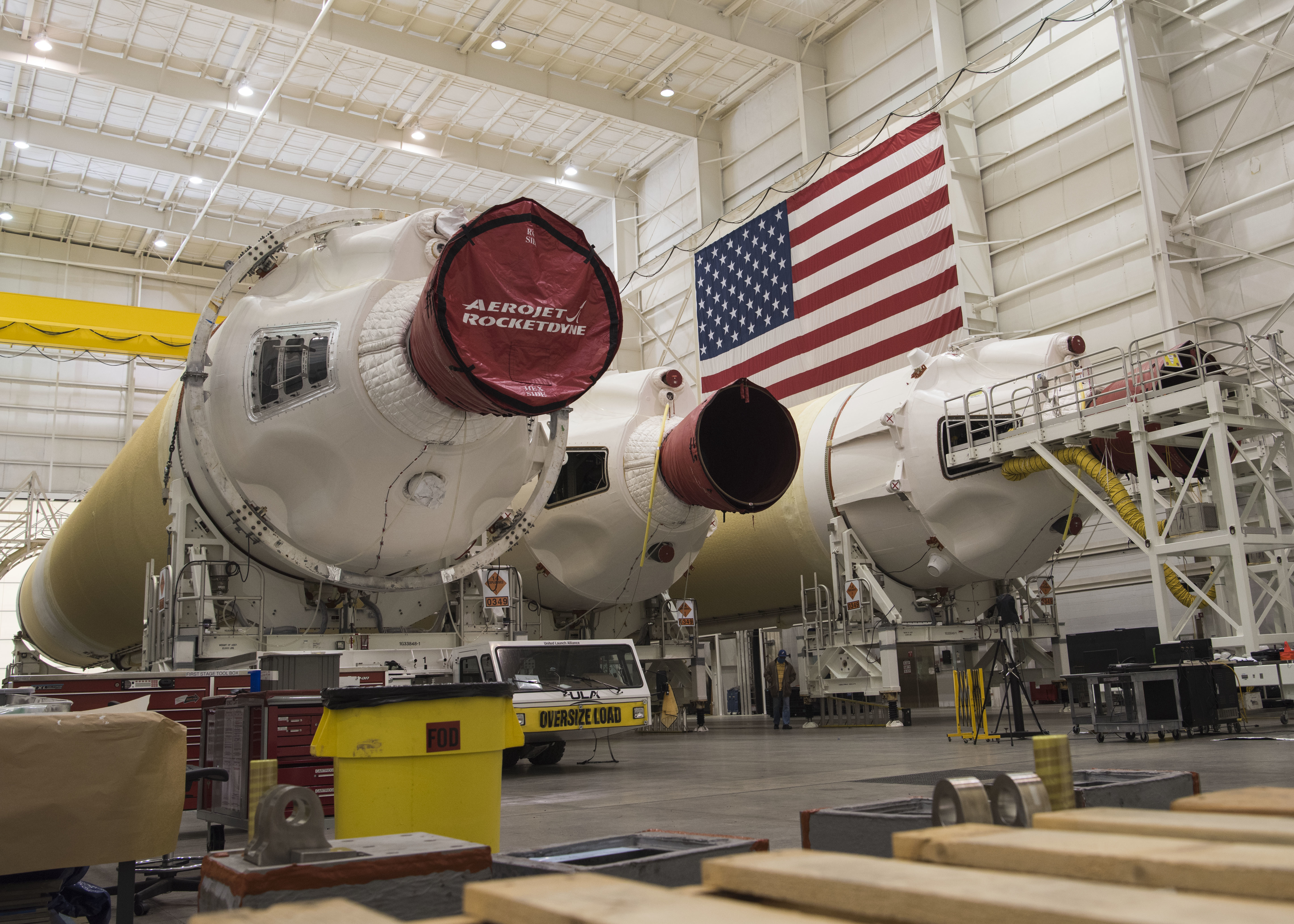
RS-68A engines of Delta IV Heavy's Common Booster Cores.

Designed and manufactured in the United States by Rocketdyne (later Pratt & Whitney Rocketdyne and Aerojet Rocketdyne). Development started in the 1990s with the goal of producing a simpler, less costly, heavy-lift engine for the Delta IV launch system. Two versions of the engine have been produced: the original RS-68 and the improved RS-68A. A third version, the RS-68B, was planned for the National Aeronautics and Space Administration's (NASA) Ares V rocket before the cancellation of the rocket and the Constellation Program in 2010.

== Design and development ==
One of the main goals of the RS-68 program was to produce a simple engine that would be cost-effective when used for a single launch. To achieve this, the RS-68 has 80% fewer parts than the multi-launch RS-25 Space Shuttle Main Engine (SSME). The adverse consequences of this simplicity were a significantly lower thrust-to-weight ratio and a 10% lower specific impulse compared to the SSME. The benefit of this simplicity is the RS-68's reduced construction cost.

The RS-68 was developed at Rocketdyne Propulsion and Power, located in Canoga Park, Los Angeles, California, where the SSME was manufactured. It was designed to power the Delta IV Evolved Expendable Launch Vehicle (EELV). The initial development engines were assembled at the nearby Santa Susana Field Laboratory where the Saturn V's Rocketdyne F-1 engines were developed and tested for the Apollo missions to the Moon. The initial testing of the RS-68 occurred at the Air Force Research Laboratory (AFRL), Edwards Air Force Base, California, and later at NASA's Stennis Space Center. The RS-68 was certified in December 2001 for use on Delta IV rockets.

An RS-68 was part of each Delta IV Common Booster Core. The largest of the launch vehicles, the Delta IV Heavy, used three CBCs mounted together.

The engine produced 758,000 pounds-force (3,370 kN) in a vacuum and 663,000 pounds-force (2,950 kN) at sea level. The engine's mass was 14,560 pounds (6,600 kg). With this thrust, the engine had a thrust-to-weight ratio of 51.2 and a specific impulse of 410 seconds (4.0 km/s) in a vacuum and 365 seconds (3.58 km/s) at sea level. The RS-68 was gimbaled hydraulically and was capable of throttling between 58% and 102% thrust.

The RS-68A is an updated version of the RS-68, with increased specific impulse and thrust (to over 700,000 pounds-force (3,100 kN) at sea level). The first launch on 29 June 2012, from the Cape Canaveral Air Force Station used three RS-68A engines mounted in a Delta IV Heavy rocket.

The RS-68 was retired as of the last Delta IV Heavy flight in April 2024.

=== Proposed uses ===
In 2006, NASA announced an intention to use five RS-68 engines instead of SSMEs on the planned Ares V. NASA chose the RS-68 because of its lower cost, about $20 million per engine including the cost of NASA's upgrades. The upgrades included a different ablative nozzle to accommodate a longer burn, a shorter start sequence, hardware changes to limit free hydrogen at ignition, and a reduction in the amount of helium used during countdown and flight. Thrust and specific impulse increases would occur under a separate upgrade program for the Delta IV rocket. Later, the Ares V was changed to use six RS-68 engines, designated the RS-68B. Ares V was dropped as part of the cancellation of the Constellation program in 2010. NASA's current successor heavy-lift vehicle, the Space Launch System, uses four RS-25 engines instead.

=== Human-rating ===
In 2008, it was reported that the RS-68 needed over 200 changes to receive a human-rating certification. NASA has stated that those changes include health monitoring, removal of the fuel-rich environment at liftoff, and improving the robustness of its subsystems.

== Variants ==
- RS-68 is the original version. It produces 663,000 pounds-force (2,950 kN) thrust at sea level.
- RS-68A is an improved version. It produces 705,000 lbf (3,140 kN) thrust at sea level and 800,000 lbf (3,560 kN) thrust in a vacuum. Its specific impulse in a vacuum is 411.9 seconds (4.039 km/s). Certification was completed in April 2011.
- RS-68B was a proposed upgrade to be used in the Ares V launch vehicle for NASA's Constellation program. The Ares V was to use six RS-68B engines on a 10 metres (33 ft) diameter core stage, along with two 5.5-segment solid rocket boosters. It was later determined that the ablative nozzle of the RS-68 was poorly suited to this multi-engine environment, causing reduced engine efficiency and extreme heating at the base of the vehicle.

== See also ==
- Comparison of orbital rocket engines
- Aerojet M-1
- National Launch System
- Rocketdyne J-2
- RS-83
- Space Launch Initiative
- TR-106
