= Common Booster Core =

American rocket stage

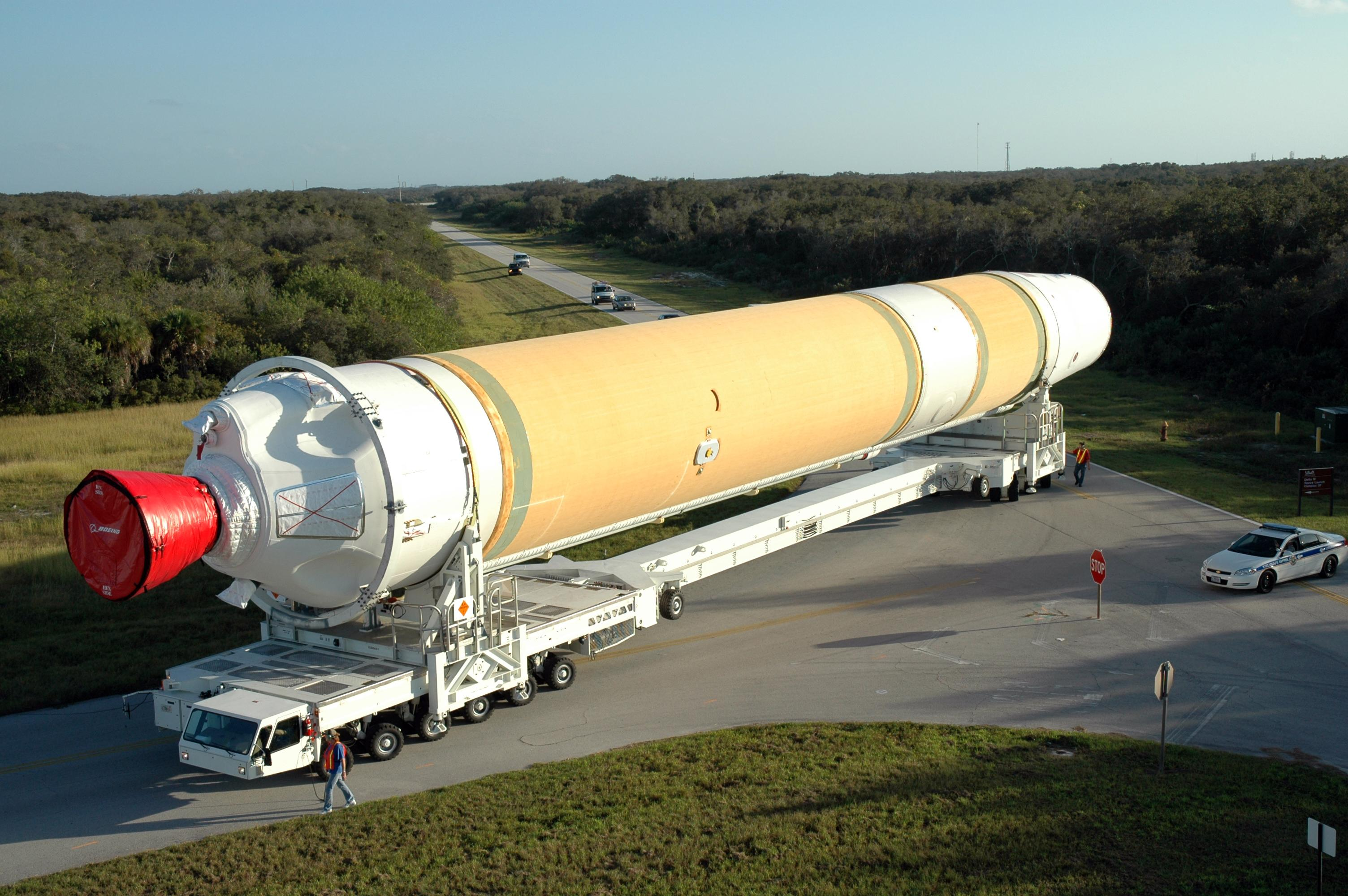
- Delivery of the CBC used as the first stage of Delta 342, which launched GOES 14
- Manufacturer: Boeing (1998–2006); United Launch Alliance (2006—2023)
- Country of origin: United States
- Used on: Delta IV (stage 1); Delta IV Heavy (boosters)

General characteristics
- Height: 40.8 m (134 ft)
- Diameter: 5.1 m (17 ft)
- Gross mass: 226,400 kg (499,100 lb)

Launch history
- Status: Retired
- Total launches: 45

Delta IV CBC
- Powered by: 1x RS-68
- Maximum thrust: 3,312.76 kN (744,740 lb_{f})
- Burn time: 367 s
- Propellant: LOX/LH_{2}

The Common Booster Core (CBC) was an American rocket stage, which was used on the Delta IV rocket as part of a modular rocket system. Delta IV rockets flying in the Medium and Medium+ configurations each used a single Common Booster Core as their first stage, while the Heavy configuration used three; one as the first stage and two as boosters. The Common Booster Core was 40.8 metres (134 ft) long, had a diameter of 5.1 metres (17 ft) and was powered by a single RS-68 engine burning liquid hydrogen and liquid oxygen.

The first static test-firing of a Common Booster Core was conducted on 17 March 2001, and the final test of the initial program was conducted on 6 May. Testing was conducted using Test Stand B-2 of the Stennis Space Center, a facility originally constructed for testing of the first stages of Saturn V rockets during the 1960s. The first launch of a Common Booster Core was the maiden flight of the Delta IV, which was launched from Space Launch Complex 37B at the Cape Canaveral Space Force Station on 20 November 2002.

The first flight of the Delta IV Heavy, featuring three Common Booster Cores, was conducted on 21 December 2004. On this flight all three CBCs malfunctioned, cutting off prematurely due to cavitation in their oxidizer lines, and resulting in the rocket reaching a lower orbit than that which had been planned. In response to the failure, additional pressure valves were installed on future launches.

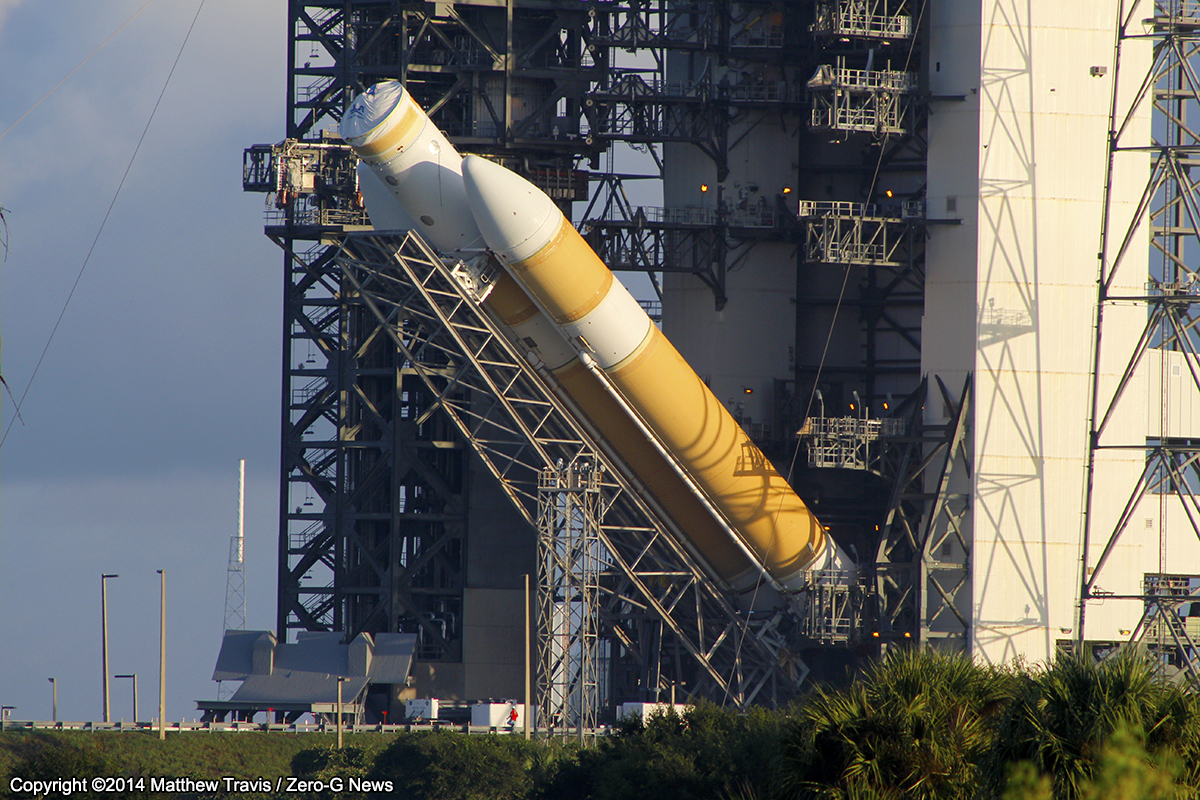
The three CBCs powering Delta IV Heavy.

The Delta IV made 45 flights; 29 in Medium and Medium+ configurations, and 16 in the Heavy configuration, resulting in a total of 77 Common Booster Cores being launched. Delta IV retired on April 24 2024.

The CBCs were manufactured in United Launch Alliance's 1,500,000-square-foot (140,000 m^{2}) manufacturing facility in Decatur, Alabama and then transported by the RS RocketShip to either Vandenberg Air Force Base or Cape Canaveral Air Force Station where they were integrated with the spacecraft and other components such as strap-on boosters and a Delta Cryogenic Second Stage.

== See also ==
- Universal Rocket Module, the Russian Angara common core.
- Falcon Heavy, the SpaceX Falcon 9 multi-core variant.
