= Delta IV Heavy =

Variant of the Delta IV space launch vehicle

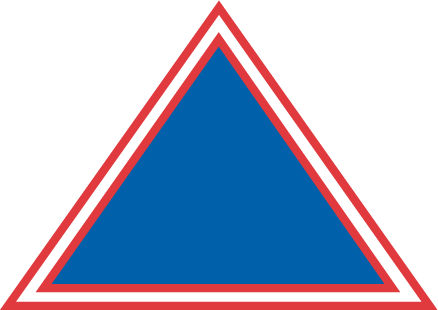

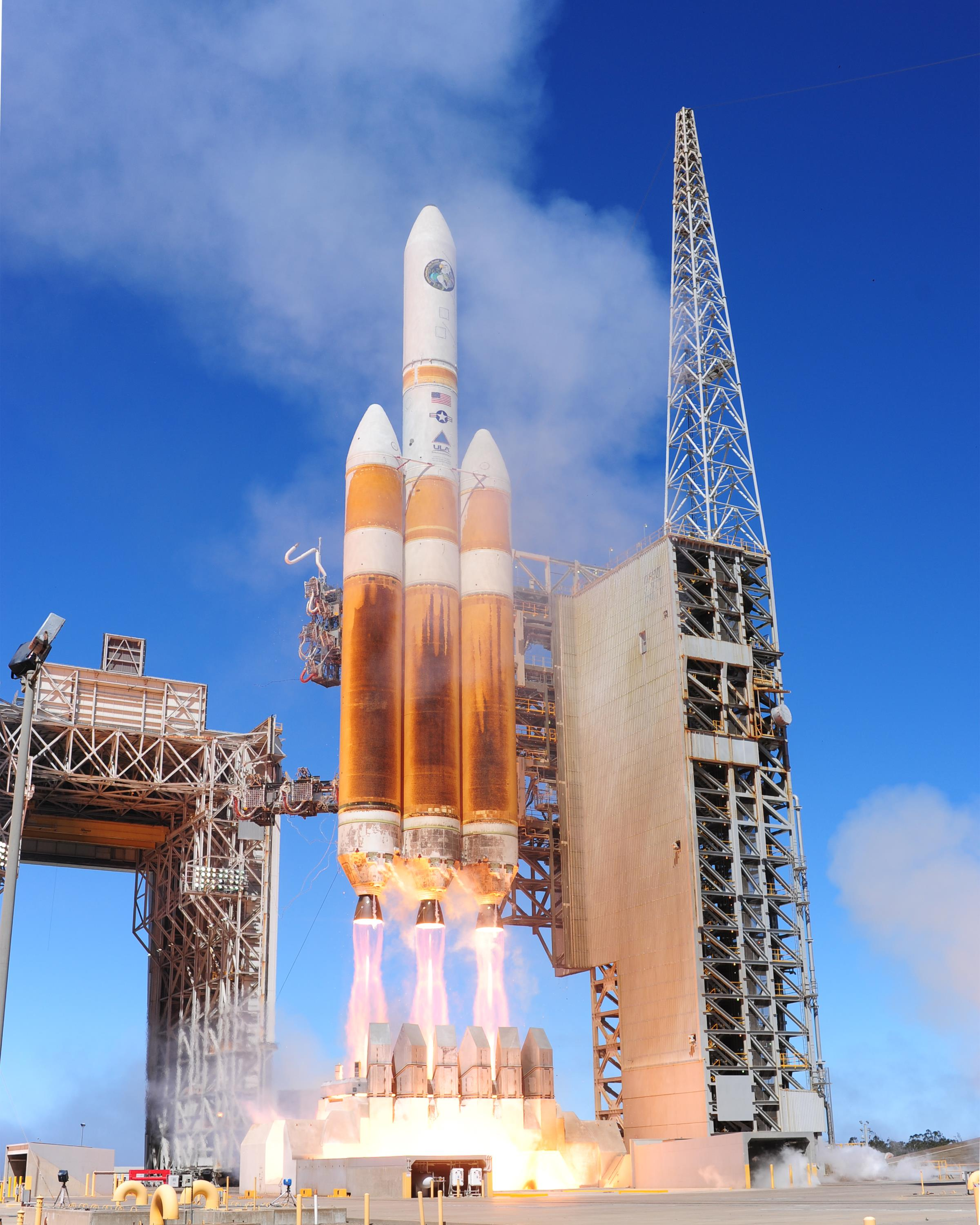
- Delta IV Heavy launches from Vandenberg Space Force Base
- Function: Heavy-lift launch vehicle
- Manufacturer: United Launch Alliance
- Country of origin: United States
- Cost per launch: US$350 million NRO: US$440 million

Size
- Height: 70.7 m (232 ft)
- Diameter: 5.1 m (17 ft)
- Width: 15.3 m (50 ft)
- Mass: 733,000 kg (1,616,000 lb)

Associated rockets
- Family: Delta
- Comparable: Long March 5; Falcon Heavy; Proton-M

Launch history
- Status: Retired
- Launch sites: Cape Canaveral, SLC-37; Vandenberg, SLC-6
- Total launches: 16
- Success(es): 15
- Partial failure: 1
- First flight: December 21, 2004 (USA-181)
- Last flight: April 9, 2024 (NROL-70)
- Carries passengers or cargo: EFT-1; NRO classified payloads; Kennen; Orion; Parker Solar Probe

Boosters – CBC
- No. boosters: 2
- Height: 40.8 m (134 ft)
- Empty mass: 26,760 kg (59,000 lb)
- Gross mass: 226,400 kg (499,100 lb)
- Propellant mass: 200,400 kg (441,800 lb)
- Powered by: 1 × RS-68
- Maximum thrust: 3,140 kN (710,000 lb_{f})
- Total thrust: 6,280 kN (1,410,000 lb_{f})
- Specific impulse: SL: 360 s (3.5 km/s) vac: 412 s (4.04 km/s)
- Burn time: 246 seconds
- Propellant: LH_{2} / LOX

First stage – CBC
- Height: 40.8 m (134 ft)
- Empty mass: 26,760 kg (59,000 lb)
- Gross mass: 226,400 kg (499,100 lb)
- Propellant mass: 200,400 kg (441,800 lb)
- Powered by: 1 × RS-68
- Maximum thrust: 3,140 kN (710,000 lb_{f})
- Specific impulse: SL: 360 s (3.5 km/s) vac: 412 s (4.04 km/s)
- Burn time: 334 seconds
- Propellant: LH_{2} / LOX

Second stage – DCSS
- Height: 13.7 m (45 ft)
- Empty mass: 3,490 kg (7,690 lb)
- Gross mass: 30,710 kg (67,700 lb)
- Propellant mass: 27,220 kg (60,010 lb)
- Powered by: 1 × RL10-B-2
- Maximum thrust: 110 kN (25,000 lbf)
- Specific impulse: 465.5 s (4.565 km/s)
- Burn time: 1,125 seconds
- Propellant: LH_{2} / LOX

The Delta IV Heavy (Delta 9250H) was an expendable heavy-lift launch vehicle, the largest member of the Delta IV family. Following the retirement of the Space Shuttle in 2011, it was the most capable operational launch vehicle until the Falcon Heavy's debut in 2018. At the time of its retirement in 2024, it ranked third among active rockets in payload capacity. Developed by Boeing and later manufactured by United Launch Alliance (ULA), it first flew in 2004. The Delta IV Heavy was retired after its 16th and final launch on 9 April 2024 and was succeeded by ULA's Vulcan Centaur rocket, which can offer similar heavy-lift capabilities at a lower cost with a single-core and six solid rocket boosters.

The vehicle consisted of three Common Booster Cores (CBCs), each powered by an RS-68 engine. Two served as strap-on boosters attached to a central core. During ascent, all three engines ignited at liftoff, with the central engine throttling down partway through flight to conserve propellant before throttling up again after booster separation.

A distinctive feature of Delta IV Heavy launches was the hydrogen-rich ignition sequence, which often produced a large fireball that scorched the insulating foam on the boosters.

== History ==
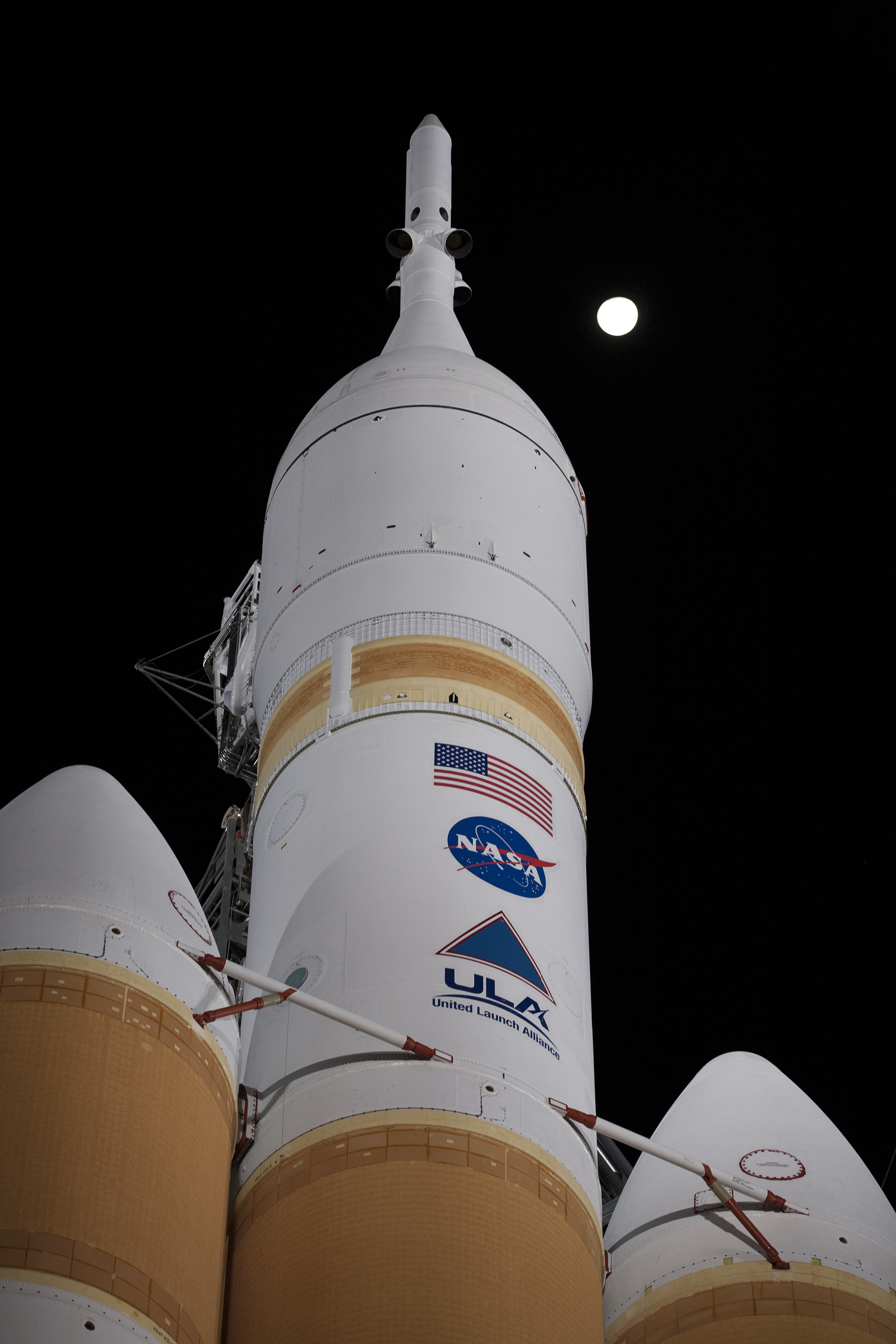
Delta IV Heavy for Exploration Flight Test-1

The Delta IV program was initiated by Boeing under the U.S. Air Force's Evolved Expendable Launch Vehicle program and was transferred to ULA in 2006. The Delta IV Heavy was developed as the most powerful configuration of the family, complementing the smaller Delta IV Medium.

Its maiden flight on December 21, 2004 carried a boilerplate payload and ended in partial failure when cavitation in liquid-oxygen lines caused premature shutdown of the engines, leaving the test article in a lower-than-intended orbit. The rocket achieved its first fully successful operational flight in 2007 with the launch of the DSP-23 satellite, and subsequently deployed several reconnaissance satellites for the National Reconnaissance Office (NRO).

The rocket was also used for two notable missions for NASA, Exploration Flight Test-1, the first uncrewed test of the Orion spacecraft in 2014, and the Parker Solar Probe launch in 2018, which required an additional Star 48BV third stage to achieve its elliptical heliocentric orbit.

Production of Delta IV Heavy hardware ended in May 2023, with its last mission flying for the NRO on April 9, 2024.

== Capabilities ==
At liftoff, the rocket had a mass of approximately 733,000 kilograms (1,616,000 lb) and generated about 9,420 kilonewtons (2,120,000 lb_{f}) of thrust.

The Delta IV Heavy had the following payload capacities:

Orbit	Payload capacity
LEO (Note: 200 km (120 mi) circular orbit at 28.7° inclination)	28,370 kg (62,550 lb)
LEO-ISS (Note: 407 km (253 mi) circular orbit at 51.6° inclination)	25,980 kg (57,280 lb)
Polar (Note: 200 km (120 mi) circular orbit at 90° inclination)	23,560 kg (51,940 lb)
MEO (Note: 20,368 km (12,656 mi) circular orbit at 55° inclination)	8,450 kg (18,630 lb)
GTO (Note: 185 km (115 mi) perigee and 35,786 km (22,236 mi) apogee orbit at 27° inclination)	14,210 kg (31,330 lb)
GEO (Note: 35,786 km (22,236 mi) circular orbit at 0° inclination)	6,580 kg (14,510 lb)
TLI (Note: Characteristic energy (C_{3}) = −2 km^{2}/sec^{2})	11,290 kg (24,890 lb)
TMI (Note: C_{3} = +20 km^{2}/sec^{2})	8,000 kg (18,000 lb)

Notes

A 20.5-meter-long (67.2 ft) carbon composite bisector payload faring was standard. The Delta IV with the extended fairing was over 62 meters (203 ft) tall.

An aluminum isogrid trisector fairing, derived from a Titan IV fairing, was also available as an option. The trisector fairing was first used on the DSP-23 flight.

== Launch history ==
Flight	Date	Payload	Mass	Launch site	Outcome
1	December 21, 2004	DemoSat, Sparkie / 3CS-1 and Ralphie / 3CS-2	≈6,000 kg (13,000 lb)	Cape Canaveral, SLC-37B	Partial failure (Note: Common Booster Cores underperformed, lower orbit than planned)
2	November 11, 2007	DSP-23	5,250 kg (11,570 lb)	Cape Canaveral, SLC-37B	Success
3	January 18, 2009	Orion 6 / Mentor 4 (USA-202 / NROL-26)	Classified	Cape Canaveral, SLC-37B	Success
4	November 21, 2010	Orion 7 / Mentor 5 (USA-223 / NROL-32)	Classified	Cape Canaveral, SLC-37B	Success
5	January 20, 2011	KH-11 Kennen 15 (USA-224 / NROL-49)	<17,000 kg (37,000 lb)	Vandenberg, SLC-6	Success
6	June 29, 2012	Orion 8 / Mentor 6 (USA-237 / NROL-15)	Classified	Cape Canaveral, SLC-37B	Success
7	August 26, 2013	KH-11 Kennen 16 (USA-245 / NROL-65)	<17,000 kg (37,000 lb)	Vandenberg, SLC-6	Success
8	December 5, 2014	Orion Exploration Flight Test-1 (EFT-1)	21,000 kg (46,000 lb) (Note: The officially reported mass of 21,000 kg includes the Launch Abort System (LAS) which did not reach orbit, but excludes the residual mass of the upper stage, which did reach orbit.)	Cape Canaveral, SLC-37B	Success
9	June 11, 2016	Orion 9 / Mentor 7 (USA-268 / NROL-37)	Classified	Cape Canaveral, SLC-37B	Success
10	August 12, 2018	Parker Solar Probe	685 kg (1,510 lb) (Note: plus Star 48BV upper stage (approx 2,100 kg))	Cape Canaveral, SLC-37B	Success
11	January 19, 2019	NROL-71	Classified	Vandenberg, SLC-6	Success
12	December 11, 2020	Orion 10 / Mentor 8 (USA-268/ NROL-44)	Classified	Cape Canaveral, SLC-37B	Success
13	April 26, 2021	KH-11 Kennen 17 (NROL-82)	Classified	Vandenberg, SLC-6	Success
14	September 24, 2022	KH-11 Kennen 18 (NROL-91)	Classified	Vandenberg, SLC-6	Success
15	June 22, 2023	Orion 11 / Mentor 9 (NROL-68)	Classified	Cape Canaveral, SLC-37B	Success
16	April 9, 2024	Orion 12 / Mentor 10 (NROL-70)	Classified	Cape Canaveral, SLC-37B	Success

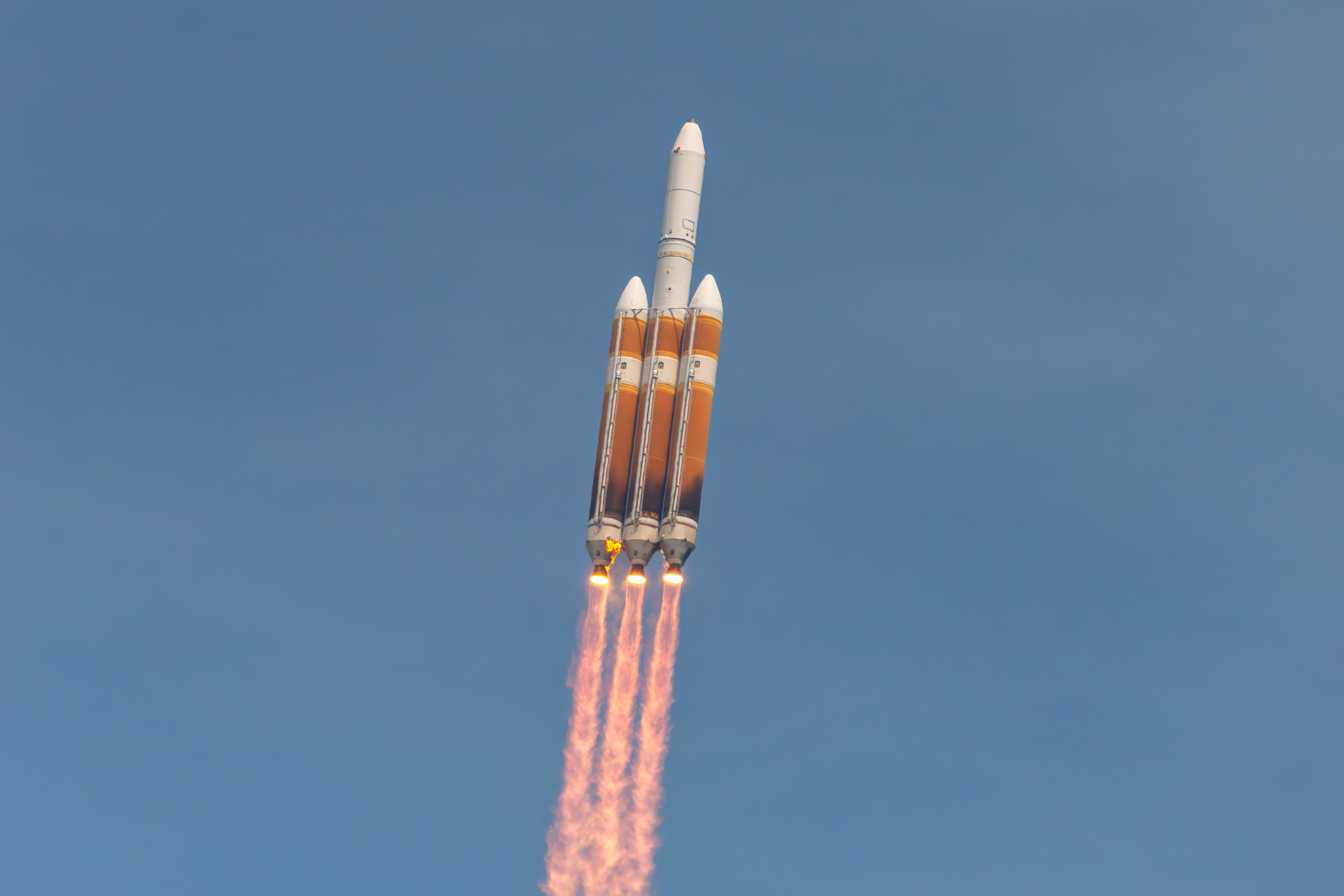
Delta IV Heavy in its final mission, NROL-70.

== Comparable vehicles ==
Current:

- Long March 5 (geostationary transfer orbit)
- Long March 5B (low Earth orbit)
- Long March 7A (geostationary transfer orbit)
- Falcon Heavy
- Proton-M
- Vulcan Centaur
- Angara A5
- Ariane 6
- New Glenn

Retired or cancelled:

- Ariane 5 (retired)
- Atlas V Heavy (proposed, never developed)
- Saturn IB (retired)
- Titan III (retired)
- Titan IV (retired)

== See also ==
- Comparison of orbital launch systems
- Comparison of orbital rocket engines
- National Launch System, (1991–1993) study
