= Hercules Inc. =

American weapons and munitions company (1912–2008)

Hercules Incorporated

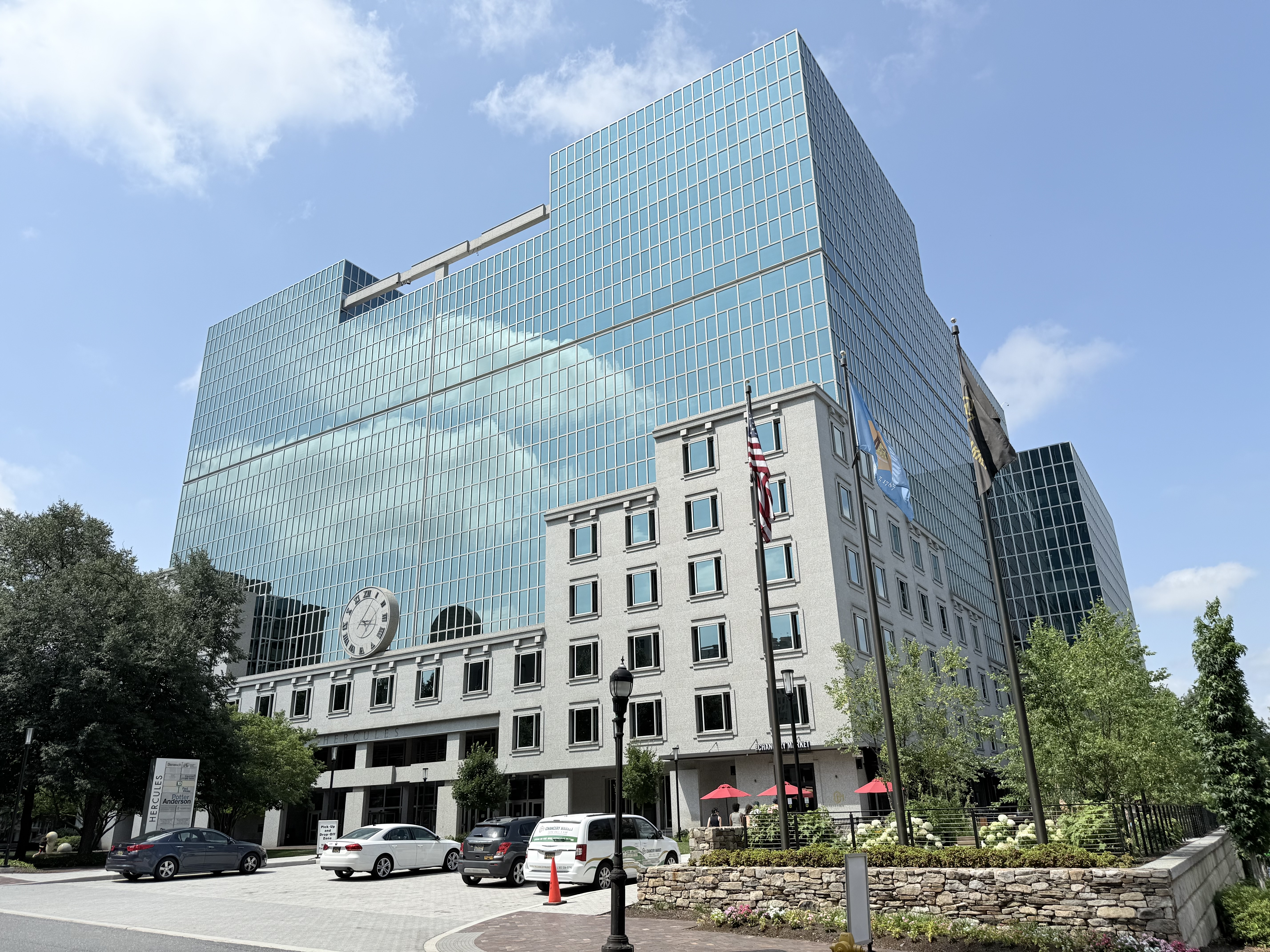
- Former headquarters in Wilmington, Delaware
- Industry: Chemical
- Founded: 1912
- Founder: T.W Bacchus
- Fate: Sold to Ashland Inc. in 2008 and dissolved
- Key people: Craig A. Rogerson, President and CEO; Allen A. Spizzo, VP and CFO; Paul C. Raymond III, VP and President, PTV; John E. Panichella, VP and President, Aqualon; Edward V. Carrington, VP of HR
- Products: Chemical, munitions
- Website: www.ashland.com

Hercules, Inc. was a chemical and munitions manufacturing company based in Wilmington, Delaware, United States, incorporated in 1912 as the Hercules Powder Company following the breakup of the DuPont explosives monopoly by the U.S. Circuit Court in 1911. Hercules Powder Company became Hercules, Inc. in 1966, operating under this name until 2008, when it was merged into Ashland Inc.

An earlier Hercules Powder Company was formed in 1882 by DuPont and Laflin & Rand Powder Company. This company was dissolved on June 30, 1904.

Hercules was one of the major producers of smokeless powder for warfare in the United States during the 20th century. At the time of its spin-off, the DuPont Corp. retained the processes and patents for the production of "single-base" nitrocellulose gunpowders, whereas Hercules was given the patents and processes for the production of "double-base" gunpowders that combined nitrocellulose and nitroglycerine.

== History ==
A special formulation of dynamite was patented in 1874 by J.W. Willard, superintendent of the California Powder Works in Santa Cruz, California. He called his invention "Hercules powder", a competitive jab at rival Giant Powder Company which had acquired the exclusive U.S. rights to Alfred Nobel's original dynamite formula. The mythological Hercules was known as a giant slayer.

The California Powder Works became the only manufacturer of Hercules powder. In 1877, J.W. Willard moved to Cleveland, Ohio to oversee the opening of a new California Powder Works plant there, dedicated to the manufacture of Hercules powder. In 1881, the California Powder Works moved its Hercules powder manufacturing in California to a new site along the northeast shore of San Francisco Bay. The company town that grew up around the facility became known as "Hercules", later (1900) incorporated as Hercules, California.

In 1882, thanks to their interlocking ownership interests with the California Powder Works by that time, the DuPont corporation and Laflin & Rand Powder Company acquired the rights to manufacture Hercules powder and incorporated the Hercules Powder Company for that purpose. In 1904, Du Pont dissolved the company as part of its ongoing effort to consolidate the many explosives manufacturers that it controlled under the Du Pont name.

In 1911, the United States won a lawsuit that it had brought against the Du Pont corporation under the Sherman Antitrust Act. The U.S. Circuit Court in Delaware found that Du Pont had been operating an unlawful monopoly, and ordered a breakup of its explosives and gunpowder manufacturing business. The breakup resulted in the creation of two new companies in 1912, Atlas Powder Company and Hercules Powder Company. Atlas received the explosives manufacturing portion of Du Pont's business (including the facilities acquired from the Giant Powder Company), while Hercules received the gunpowder portion.

The first management team of this new Hercules Powder Company included President H. Dunham, T.W. Bacchus, G.G. Rheuby, J.T Skelly, Norman Rood, Fred Stark, C.D. Prickett, and George Markell.

Some of their products were used by the military in World War I.

In the 1920s and 30s, Hercules diversified into the pine resin products business (see below).

A school and a plant were named after T. W. Bacchus in Bacchus, Utah. By the 1960s, the community was experiencing the first signs of a suburban transition. The Hercules Powder Co., once a small dynamite manufacturing firm, had begun producing rocket motors at its Bacchus Works south of the Magna community. The growing availability of jobs was one factor encouraging subdivision development in the Magna, Kearns and West Valley areas.

Hercules Powder Company ranked 65th among United States corporations in the value of World War II military production contracts.

On September 12, 1940, the Kenvil, New Jersey plant suffered a major explosion. News reports at the time estimated at least fifteen buildings were destroyed along with twenty-five tons of explosives. Fifty-one people were killed outright with perhaps two hundred injured and many missing. This facility also exploded twice in 1934 and again in 1989.

Richard F. Heck, recipient of the 2010 Nobel Prize in Chemistry, gained experience with transition metal chemistry while working at Hercules in 1957.

In 1966, the Hercules Powder Company changed its name to Hercules, Inc.

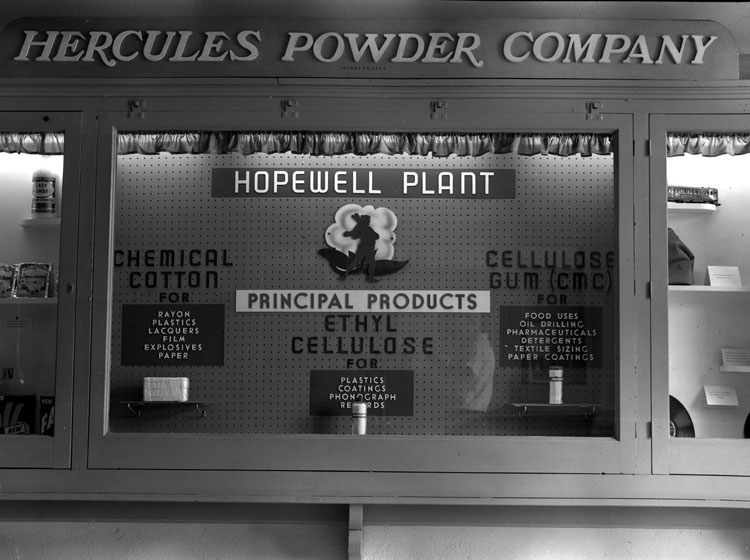
Display showing Hercules products in the 1950s

In 1995, Hercules, Inc. sold its subsidiary Hercules Aerospace Co. to Alliant Techsystems Inc. The sale included all of what remained of Hercules' gunpowder lines.

By the end of the 1990s, Hercules Inc., had sold off a significant number of its divisions that had not been profitable for the company. This caused the price of shares of common stock in Hercules to rise above US$70. Several successful cost-savings programs were implemented in addition to buying back its own shares. Also at that time, Hercules had a significant amount of assets available for possible purchases of other corporations. Hercules, Inc., had a Paper Technology Division (PTD) whose products were slowly becoming commodities. To survive, this division needed to obtain new products.

First, Hercules Inc., tried to purchase the Allied Colloids Company, but this was not successful. Next, Hercules bought the Betz-Dearborn Corporation. Betz-Dearborn produced mostly chemicals for paper processing, and the Hercules PTD produced mainly functional chemicals for paper. According to some business analysts, Hercules Inc. paid about three times as much for Betz-Dearborn as compared with its actual value.

Soon after the purchase of Betz-Dearborn, the price per share of stock in Hercules Inc., had dropped from above US$70 to below US$10. It has been speculated that Hercules Inc., was close to going bankrupt after this failed purchase operation. Afterwards, several senior managers were forced out of the company because of this failure; however, a significant amount of former PTD senior managers were able to keep their positions within Hercules. The price of stock shares in Hercules Inc. never recovered from this debacle. Finally, Hercules Inc. was sold off to the Ashland Corporation in 2008, and dissolved.

In 2009, rapper George Watsky released a song about the history of the company called "Hercules".

== Product lines ==
=== Commercial gunpowders ===
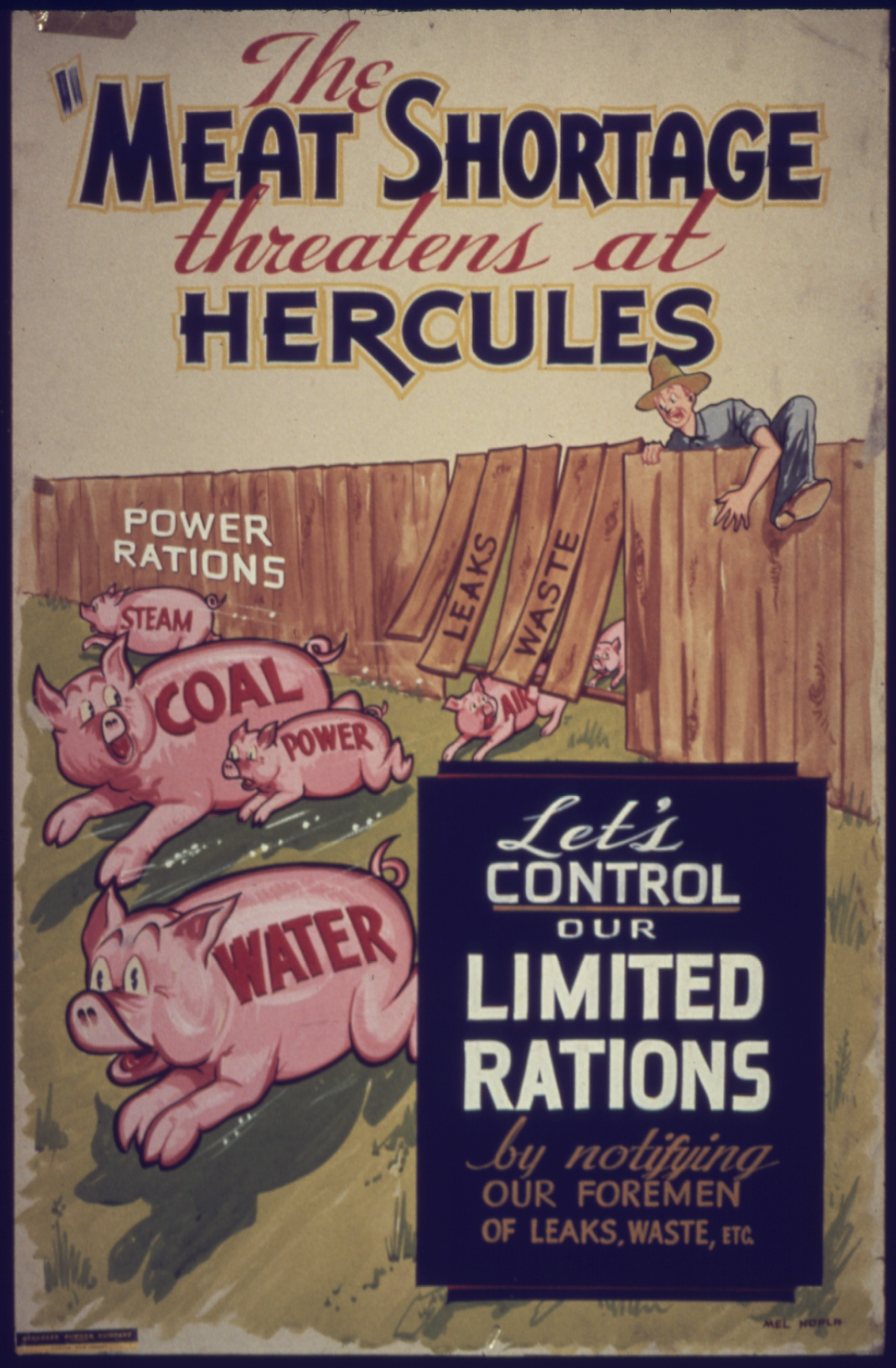
World War II poster from Hercules

Some of the more recent gunpowders marketed to reloaders include the brand names "Bullseye", "2400", "Reloder", "Unique", and "Red Dot". These gunpowders are still being manufactured by Alliant Techsystems Inc. in Radford, Virginia.

==== Powders inherited from DuPont in 1912 ====
- EC (Explosives Company) shotgun powder was the first smokeless powder manufactured in the United States. Production began in 1890, and was discontinued in 1931.
- WA .30 caliber powder was named W for United States Army Lieutenant Whistler and A for American Smokeless Powder Company factory superintendent Aspinwall. This tubular powder was used for military loading of the .30 U.S. Army (the M1892 Springfield and the M1893 Gatling) from 1894 until the military specification was changed to single-base nitrocellulose powder in 1908. Grains of 2 mm (0.08 inch) diameter were 1 mm long. Hercules continued producing the powder for other users until 1930.
- Sharpshooter was a flake powder introduced by Laflin & Rand in 1897 to replace black powder for loading the .45-70. Black flakes containing 15 to 18 percent nitroglycerin were approximately 2 mm in diameter. Production was discontinued after World War II.
- Bullseye was introduced by Laflin & Rand in 1898. Large surface area per unit weight enables rapid combustion in short-barreled handguns. Laflin & Rand began production using small, irregular particles removed by screening runs of larger grained powders. Improved manufacturing processes offered other reclamation options for reduced quantities of rejected material. Hercules manufactured Bullseye as thin, round flakes. It is believed to be the oldest smokeless powder formulation still being manufactured in the United States. It is designed for handguns and can also be used in 12-gauge shotgun target loads
- Lightning was introduced by Laflin & Rand in 1899 for lever action sporting rifles like the .30-30 Winchester and .303 Savage. Production of 2 mm diameter flakes was discontinued after World War II. Tubular Lightning # 2 was manufactured from 1903 to 1929.
- Infallible was a flake shotgun powder introduced by Laflin & Rand in 1900. Initial production had an orange color, but graphite coating gave later production a black color. Production was discontinued after World War II.
- Unique is a gray flake powder introduced by Laflin & Rand in 1900. Individual flakes are approximately 1.5 mm (0.06 inch) in diameter. It is designed for shotguns and can be used in handguns.
- Bear was a tubular powder introduced by Laflin & Rand in 1908 for small capacity rifle cartridges like the .351 and .401 Winchester Self-Loading and the .32-20 and .25-20 Winchester. Production was discontinued after World War II.
- Military Rifle (MR) # 19 was a tubular powder containing 20 percent nitroglycerin introduced by DuPont in 1908 and was renamed HiVel (# 1) when manufactured by Hercules. It was modified as HiVel # 2 in 1915. Production was discontinued in 1964. A smaller grained version was produced as HiVel # 3 from 1926 to 1941.

==== Powders developed by Hercules Powder Company ====
- Hercules # 308 was Hercules production of single-base tubular Pyro DG (Diphenylamine Graphited) powder for loading military .30-06 Springfield ammunition through World War I. Production began in 1915 and continued through the 1920s.
- Hercules # 300 was a black, tubular single-base rifle powder produced from 1916 to 1932.
- Pyro was produced from 1922 to 1928 as lightly graphited yellow flakes for loading the .45 ACP.
- Hercules # 2400 is a coated flake powder containing 20 percent nitroglycerin introduced in 1932. Individual dark gray flakes are approximately 1 mm (0.04 inch) in diameter and 0.3 mm thick. It is designed for small capacity center-fire rifle cartridges and can be used in magnum handgun and .410 bore shotgun loads.
- Red Dot is a flake powder introduced in 1932. Individual flakes are approximately 1.5 mm (0.06 inch) in diameter and some are dyed red to aid identification. It is designed for light and standard loads for 12, 16, and 20 gauge shotguns and can be used in handguns.
- HiVel # 6 was produced from 1933 to 1941 for loading the .30-06 Springfield.
- Herco is a flake powder introduced in the 1930s. Individual flakes are approximately 1.5 mm (0.06 inch) in diameter. It is designed for heavy loads for 10, 12, 16, 20 and 28 gauge shotguns and can be used for heavy handgun loads.
- Green Dot is a flake powder introduced in 1965. Individual flakes are approximately 1.5 mm (0.06 inch) in diameter and some are dyed green to aid identification. It is designed for medium and standard loads for 12, 16, and 20 gauge shotguns and can be used in handguns.
- Reloder 7 was the most popular of three cylindrical rifle powders introduced in 1965 to replace HiVel # 2. Each powder was blended from four different formulations dyed different colors. Production of the other two longer-grained powders, Reloder 11 and Reloder 21, was discontinued in 1972.
- Blue Dot is a flake powder introduced in 1972. Individual flakes are approximately 1.5 mm (0.06 inch) in diameter and some are dyed blue to aid identification. It is designed for magnum loads for 10, 12, 16, 20 and 28 gauge shotguns and can be used for magnum handgun loads.

=== Pine resin products ===
In the 1911, Hercules entered the pine resin products business, a development which followed upon the faster clearing of forests for lumber and farmland, especially in the southeast U.S., around the time of the First World War. The clearings had left many stumps which had to be removed, often with dynamite supplied by Hercules and others. Hercules itself was a consumer of wood pulp, a key ingredient in their dynamite. The increasing surplus of wood pulp led the company to the idea of producing other things from it, namely, the various chemicals that were present in pine resin. They set up production sites such as the one in Hattiesburg, Mississippi, and Brunswick, Georgia for this express purpose, and added to their raw supply by offering to take or buy tree stumps from farmers.

=== Solid-fuel rocket motor production ===
Beginning in 1959, Hercules, Inc., began to diversify into the production of large solid-propellant rocket motors, and it soon became a primary producer of these, especially for the U.S. Department of Defense, U.S. Air Force, U.S. Navy, and U.S. Army – and to a lesser degree for the civilian National Aeronautics and Space Administration (NASA). In 1961, the company hired contractors C.H. Leavell & Company, Morrison-Knudsen, and Alaskan Plumbing and Heating Company to expand the existing Bacchus Works site. The government-owned, contractor-operated "Air Force Plant 81" added 97 buildings, including a 97,000 square foot administration building. One of its major solid-fuel rocket products was the third-stage engine for the three-stage solid-fueled Minuteman intercontinental ballistic missile (ICBM) for the U.S. Air Force, of which 1,000 were made and deployed at Air Force Bases in several northern states during the 1960s. In addition, all of the missiles of the Minuteman I series were removed from service and replaced with the Minuteman II and Minuteman III series of more-advanced ICBMs. Hence, the Minuteman ICBM program was a huge project and a major source of revenue for Hercules, Inc. The site of Air Force Plant 81 is the subject of a Utah Division of Environmental Response and Remediation assessment.

Hercules, Inc., also produced the solid-fueled rocket motors for the two-stage Polaris missile system of intermediate-range ballistic missiles (IRBMs) for the U.S. Navy in its 41 for Freedom series of 41 George Washington class ballistic missile submarines. These nuclear submarines carried 16 Polaris missiles apiece for a grand total of 656 missiles. In addition, the Polaris series consisted of the successively-improved Polaris A-1, Polaris A-2, and Polaris A-3 missiles. The early Polaris submarines that had been armed with the Polaris A-1 were upgraded to the Polaris A-2; and then all that had been armed with the Polaris A-2 were upgraded to the Polaris A-3.

For some of the early Polaris submarines, the Polaris A-3 was the end of their upgrades, but a large number of them (about 31) were further rearmed with the more-advanced and longer-ranged two-stage Poseidon C-3 missile. Hence, the Polaris missile submarine program was also a huge project and a major source of revenue for Hercules, Inc.

During the 1960s, Hercules, Inc., also made solid-fuel rocket motors for hundreds of the U.S. Army's Honest John missile, a mobile tactical missile for carrying tactical nuclear weapons for U.S. Army divisions. The Honest John missile was mostly deployed with the U.S. Seventh Army in West Germany as part of the American commitment to NATO to defend Western Europe against aggression from the Warsaw Pact, using nuclear weapons on Eastern Europe, if necessary. None of the Honest John, Minuteman, Polaris, or Poseidon has ever been used in combat, and the threat of nuclear war has been sufficient to deter aggression and make it unnecessary to use nuclear weapons for defense.

During the 1970s and 80s, the Honest John missile was removed from deployment, scrapped, and replaced by the more-advanced Lance missile by the U.S. Army in Europe. Of all of the missiles mentioned above, only a reduced number of the Minuteman missiles remain in service at Air Force Bases in the United States, with all of the others having been removed from deployment and scrapped, along with all of the Polaris and Poseidon submarines.

For space exploration and satellite launches by the U.S. Air Force and NASA, Hercules, Inc., developed and manufactured the two large, strap-on solid-fueled Solid Rocket Motor Upgrade (SRMU) booster rockets for the otherwise liquid-fueled Titan IVB rockets. These strap-on rockets replaced the UA120 series of boosters used on the Titan IVB's predecessors, the Titan IIIC, Titan IIIE and Titan IVA.

After the end of production and firing of NASA's huge Saturn IB and Saturn V rockets, the Titan IV was the largest and heaviest unmanned rocket available anywhere in the world, and especially in the Titan IV–Centaur version. The Titan IV-Centaur was used for special launches of heavy space probes into the Solar System, such as the Cassini-Huygens mission to Saturn which was launched in 1997. The Titan IV is no longer manufactured, and the last one of these was fired during a launch in October 2005. In 1995 the aerospace division of Hercules, including its solid motor line, was acquired by the American defense contractor ATK.

== Business segments ==
In its later years, Hercules, Inc., manufactured and marketed worldwide specialist chemicals that were used in a wide variety of industrial, home, and office markets, and it and had over 4,500 employees. Hercules was composed of two major divisions: the Paper Technologies and Ventures (PTV) division and the Aqualon division. In 2005, the former accounted for 49% of its sales and 35% of its operating profits, with the latter producing 37% and 68% respectively.

=== Aqualon Group ===
Aqualon produces products for physical property modification of aqueous systems which are sold into a wide variety of industries including personal care, food additives, and construction.

=== Paper Technologies and Ventures Group ===
==== Paper Technologies ====
Paper Technologies produces specialty chemicals to the pulp and paper industry. These products include functional, process, and water treatment chemicals for a wide variety of pulp and paper applications.

Functional chemicals can be divided in three main groups. Wet strength resins, Rosin sizes and AKD -sizes. Significant persons developing functional chemicals in Hercules could be mentioned: Dr. Keim on his efforts developing PAE wet strength resin, Mr Kai Kiviö on his efforts on developing cationic rosin size. Basis of AKD -technology Hercules acquired more or less voluntary from German BASF after the Second World War.

==== Ventures ====
Ventures produces specialty chemicals for a variety of markets, including adhesives and sealants, paints, inks, coatings, lubricants, rubber, plastics, and building and construction.

Hercules Incorporated, in collaboration with Professor Kaichang Li of Oregon State University and Columbia Forest Products, received a 2007 Presidential Green Chemistry Challenge Award for the Greener Synthetic Pathways category in developing and commercializing a formaldehyde-free adhesive made from soy flour and Hercules' unique polymer chemistries.

== See also ==
- Tekoi, a former solid fuel rocket motor test and calibration site operated by Hercules Aerospace
