= Mercury (satellite) =

Series of United States spy satellites

- Country of origin: United States
- Operator: National Reconnaissance Office; United States Air Force
- Applications: Espionage

Specifications
- Launch mass: 4,000–5,000 kilograms (8,800–11,000 lb)
- Regime: Geostationary

Production
- Built: 3
- Launched: 3
- Failed: 1
- Maiden launch: 27 August 1994, 8:56:58 UTC
- Last launch: 12 August 1998, 11:30:01 UTC

Mercury, also known as Advanced Vortex, was a series of three United States spy satellites launched in the 1990s. These satellites were launched and operated by the National Reconnaissance Office with the participation of the United States Air Force. The satellites collect SIGINT from near-geosynchronous orbits. Their precise mission and capabilities are highly classified, but they are widely believed to be successors to the Vortex/Chalet satellites.

== Launches ==
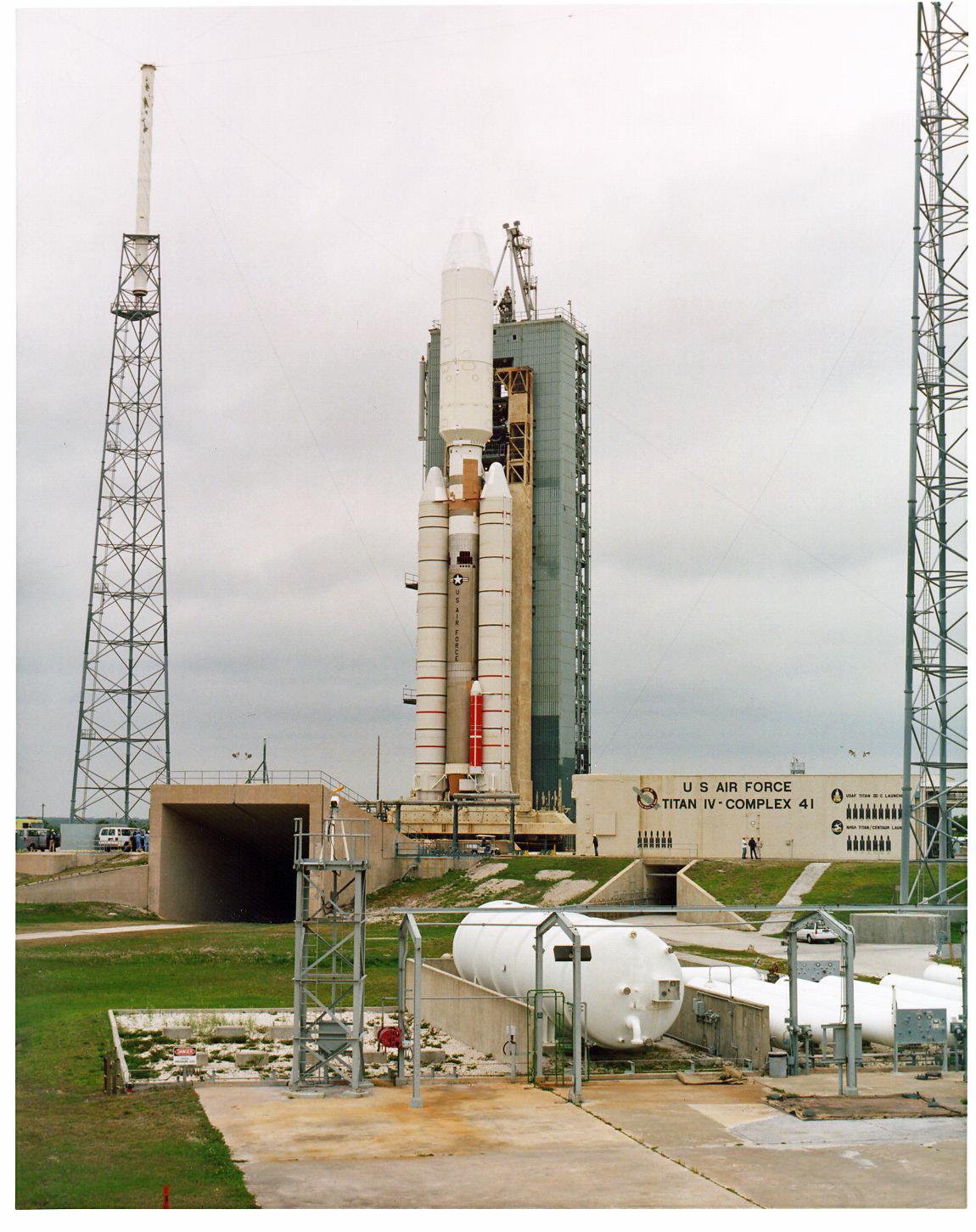
Titan IVA Centaur with Mercury ELINT spy satellite, April 24, 1996

Two of the three launches from CCAFS LC-41 were successful, with the third failing to achieve orbit. All launches used a Titan IV(401)A rocket.

The last launch attempt, on 12 August 1998 failed, with the US$700–800 million satellite and the $344 million Titan IV(401)A launch vehicle exploding over the Atlantic Ocean. The failure was caused by a short circuit in the guidance system, which lost power and reset, causing the vehicle to pitch over. This in turn led to premature separation of one of the SRBs, which automatically self-destructed. The resulting explosion also destroyed the core vehicle, and the second SRB then initiated its own self-destruction. Roughly 4 seconds later the Range Safety Officer also issued a self-destruct signal to the rocket. Observers estimate each spacecraft has a mass of 4,000–5,000 kg.

Name	COSPAR ID SATCAT No.	Launch date (UTC)	Launch designation	Remarks
USA-105	1994-054A; 23223	27 August 1994; 08:56:58	N/A	
USA-118	1996-026A; 23855	24 April 1996; 23:37:01	N/A	
Unnamed	N/A	12 August 1998; 11:30:01	NROL-7	Failed to orbit
