= Solid Rocket Motor Upgrade =

American solid propellant rocket motor

Solid Rocket Motor Upgrade (SRMU)
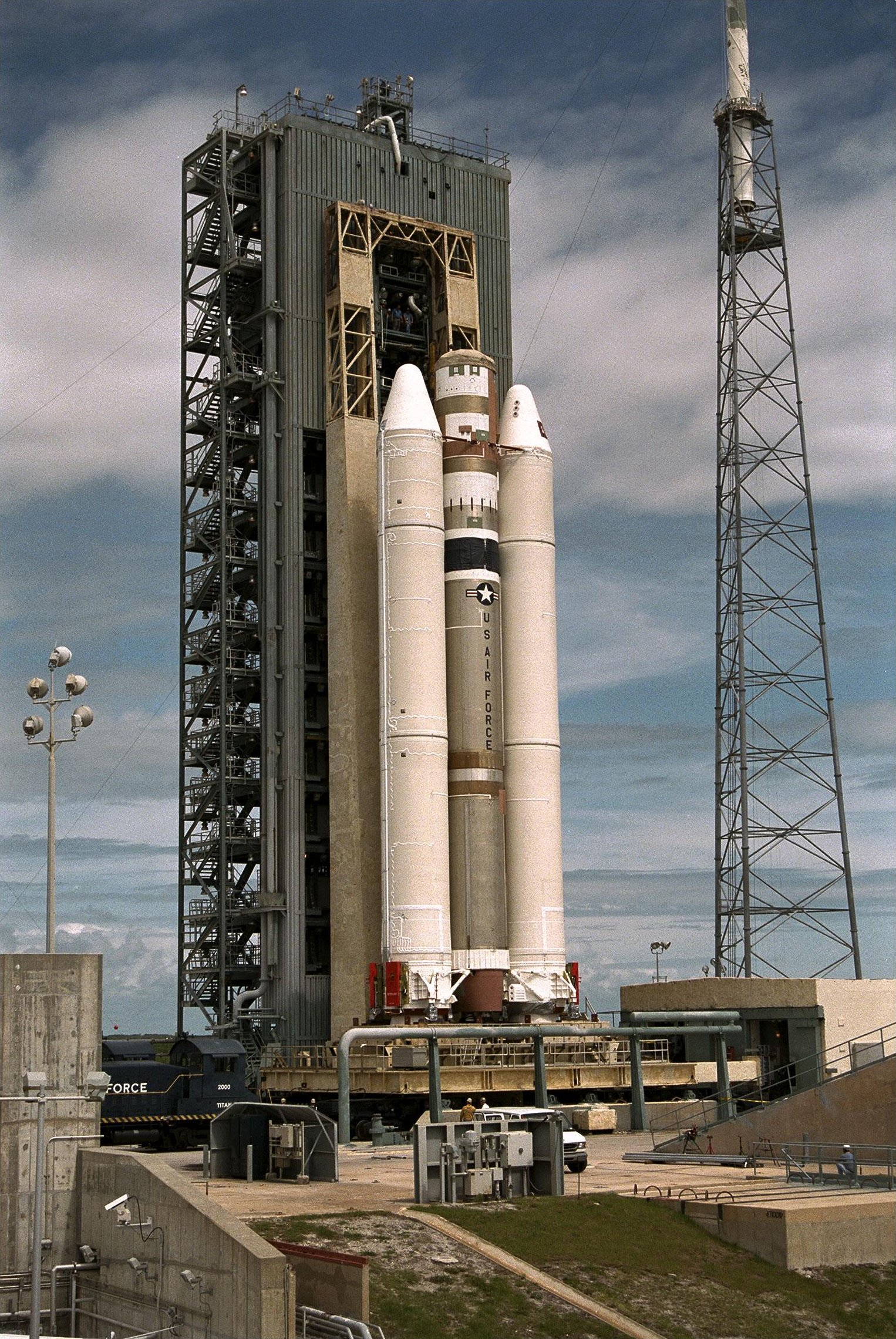
- Titan IV-B with 2 SRMU boosters
- Country of origin: United States
- Designer: Hercules
- Manufacturer: Alliant Techsystems
- Application: Solid rocket booster
- Predecessor: UA1207
- Status: Retired

Solid-fuel motor
- Propellant: HTPB
- Casing: Composite

Configuration
- Nozzle ratio: 15.7

Performance
- Thrust: 6.41 MN (1,440,502 lbf) average
- Chamber pressure: 859.5 psi (5,926 kPa)
- Specific impulse, vacuum: 285.6 s (2.801 km/s)
- Specific impulse, sea-level: 251.4 s (2.465 km/s)
- Burn time: 135.7s
- Thrust vectoring: 6 degrees

Dimensions
- Length: 34.26 m (1349 in)
- Diameter: 3.2m (126 in)
- Empty mass: 80,611 lb (36,565 kg)

The Solid Rocket Motor Upgrade (SRMU) was a solid rocket motor that was used as a booster on the Titan IVB launch vehicle. Developed by Hercules (later ATK), it was intended to be a high-performance, low-cost upgrade to the UA1207 boosters previously used on Titan IV. Wound from carbon-fibre-reinforced polymer and burning a hydroxyl-terminated polybutadiene-bound ammonium perchlorate composite propellant, it was an ambitious upgrade building on Hercules' experience developing a filament-wound case for the Space Shuttle SRB. Originally intended to fly in 1990, it instead first flew in 1997 due to a protracted development and lack of demand. The SRMU performed successfully on all of its flights.

== Design ==
The SRMU is a three-segment solid rocket motor. Each segment has a casing wound from graphite fibre composite and an insulation system of EPDM rubber and kevlar. The casing is filled with a fuel grain composed primarily of ammonium perchlorate and aluminium, joined by a HTPB binder. Upon launch, the booster weighs approximately 776,000 lbs (352,000 kg). The SRMU participates in vehicle control using a hydraulically driven thrust-vectoring nozzle, which can move up to 6 degrees. The hydraulic system features redundant pumps that keep the fluid loop at 3,150 psi (21.7 MPa). These characteristics were chosen for greater performance and higher reliability compared to its predecessor, the UA1207, which was manufactured from 7 segments and used liquid fuel injection for steering. There are six stage separation motors, three fore and three aft, which push the empty casing away from the launcher's core after booster burnout.

The SRMU's electrical equipment and instrumentation is located within the nosecone at the front of the booster. Like the Space Shuttle's RSRM, operating voltage for the electrical system was 28V DC. An electrical detonator is used to activate pyrotechnics for booster ignition and staging, and for the flight termination system, which consists of a shaped charge explosive designed to destroy the booster in flight. The booster is attached to the vehicle core by a reinforced aft skirt near the base of the motor, which also transmits the thrust loads between the two structures. This skirt also contains the assembly for the thrust vectoring control (TVC) system. The nozzle itself is made of steel, wrapped in an epoxy composite similar to that on the motor segments. Additional structural elements include steel bands at segment joins. Each segment is manufactured separately, then integrated at the launch site.

As is typical for solid rocket motors, thrust varies throughout the course of the burn. The SRMU's fuel geometry is designed to generate highest thrust before 40 seconds, and to rapidly decrease thrust after 120 seconds. Two SRMUs provide all of the Titan IV-B's thrust at liftoff and function as a "stage 0"; the LR87-AJ-11 on the core ignites at T+131 seconds, 15 seconds before booster separation.

== Development ==
In the wake of the 1986 Space Shuttle Challenger Disaster, in which a seal joining two solid rocket motor segments failed, destroying the vehicle and killing all 7 crew, the US Air Force was concerned about the United Technologies-built UA120 boosters used on Titan carrier rockets. First flown in 1965, the UA120s were built from many segments and had a heavy thrust vectoring system that sprayed dinitrogen tetroxide into the nozzle flow to deflect thrust. Therefore, in 1987, the Air Force and the Titan's manufacturer, Martin Marietta, issued a request for proposals for a new booster to be used on Titan. A fixed-price contract was awarded to Hercules Inc. for the new motor.

Numerous delays took place during development. Martin Marietta changed the majority of its design requirements for the SRMU between 1988 and 1990, rendering progress slow. The SRMU was the largest motor Hercules had ever built, and it was also its first use of HTPB binder. Early in development, a test segment was lost due to improper fuel casting. In 1990, prior to the first stacking of the motor, the crane assembling the booster dropped a segment, causing it to roll away from the test area and explode. One worker was killed and nine injured. The mishap also caused the first launch of a Titan IV with SRMU boosters to be delayed; originally, the new booster was expected to launch in 1991. One year later, in the SRMU's first test firing, the motor exploded upon ignition. The motor had to be thoroughly redesigned. In the meantime, Martin Marietta placed an order for more UA120 motors, as the SRMU would not be ready in time. At the same time, Hercules' costs severely exceeded the value of the contract it had been awarded. The United States Congress in 1993 directed the Air Force to provide an additional $350 million to allow Hercules to finish work on the SRMU. Before the end of 1994, the booster had finally been qualified for flight.

By 1994, it had become apparent that Martin Marietta's additional order for UA1207 boosters, combined with a decline in demand for launches, was resulting in a surplus of completed Titan IV carrier rockets. As a result, the SRMU would not be needed until 1997. A total of 17 flight sets of boosters were ordered; the last were used on the last Titan flight in 2005.

In 2000, the carbon-phenolic coated nozzle of the SRMU was redesigned. The new nozzle used new materials that were cleaner than those previously used, which were incompliant with new environmental regulations.

== Gallery ==
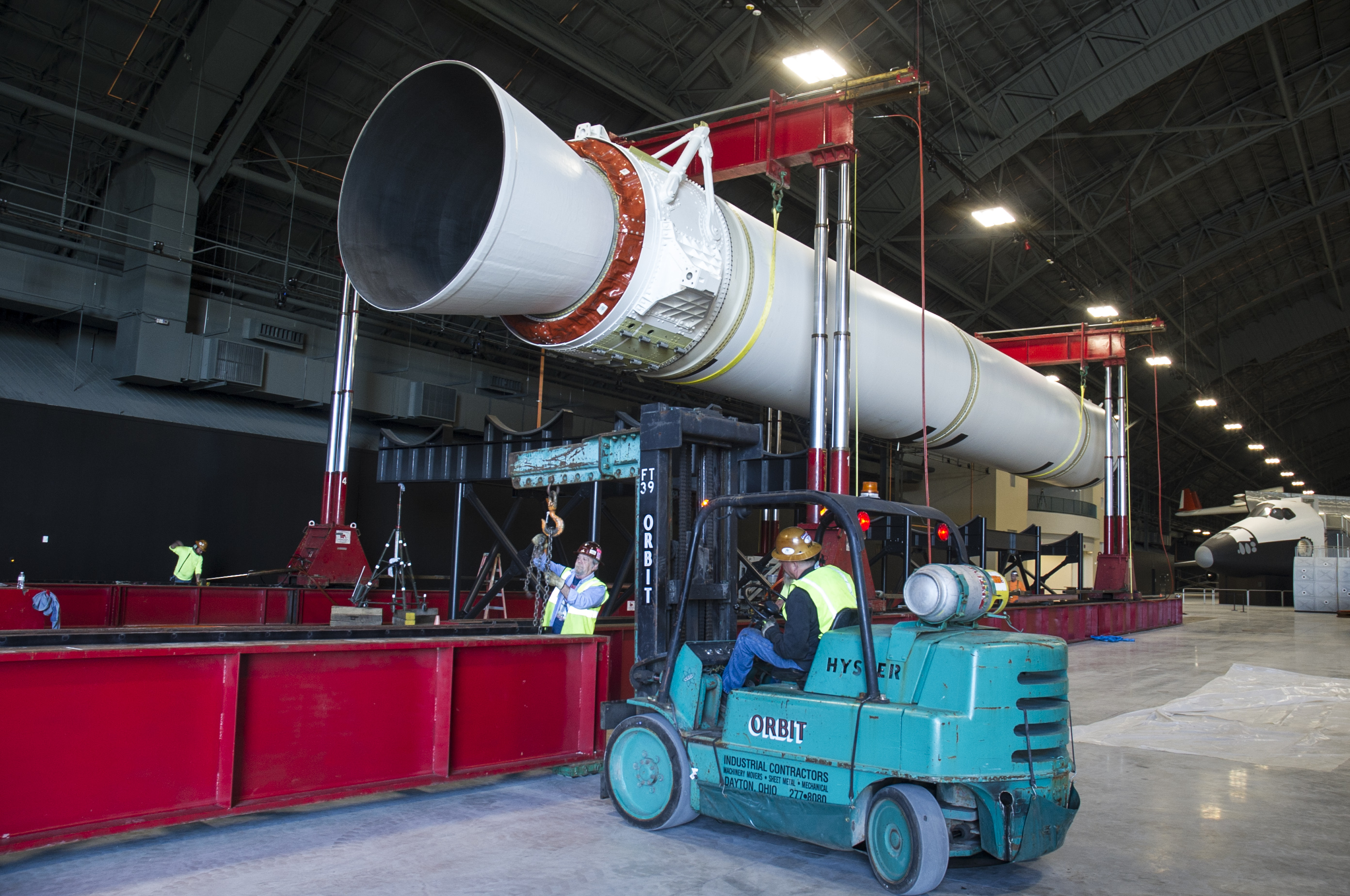
SRMU lifted at the Museum of the US Air Force

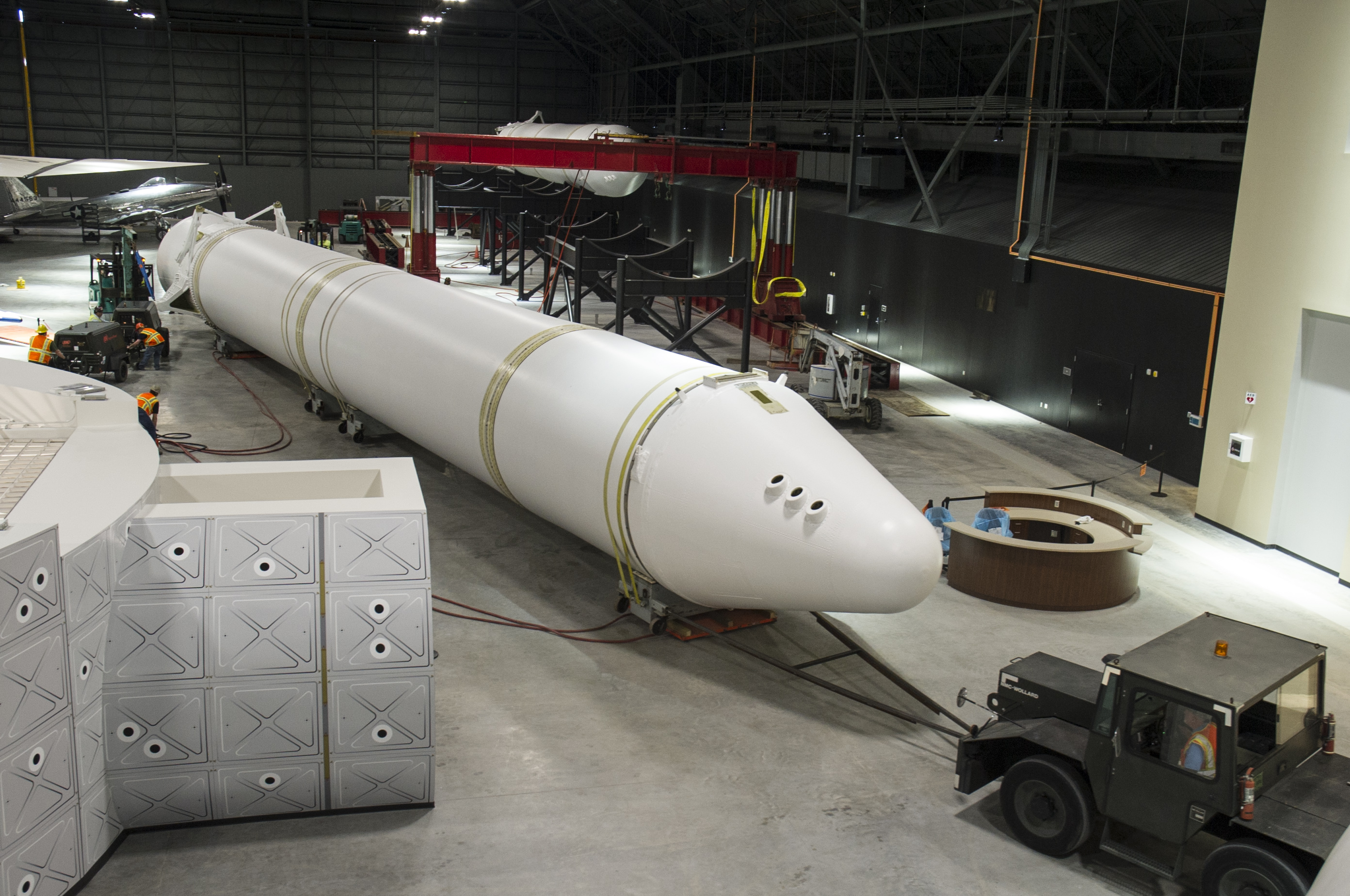
Integrated SRMU at the Museum of the US Air Force

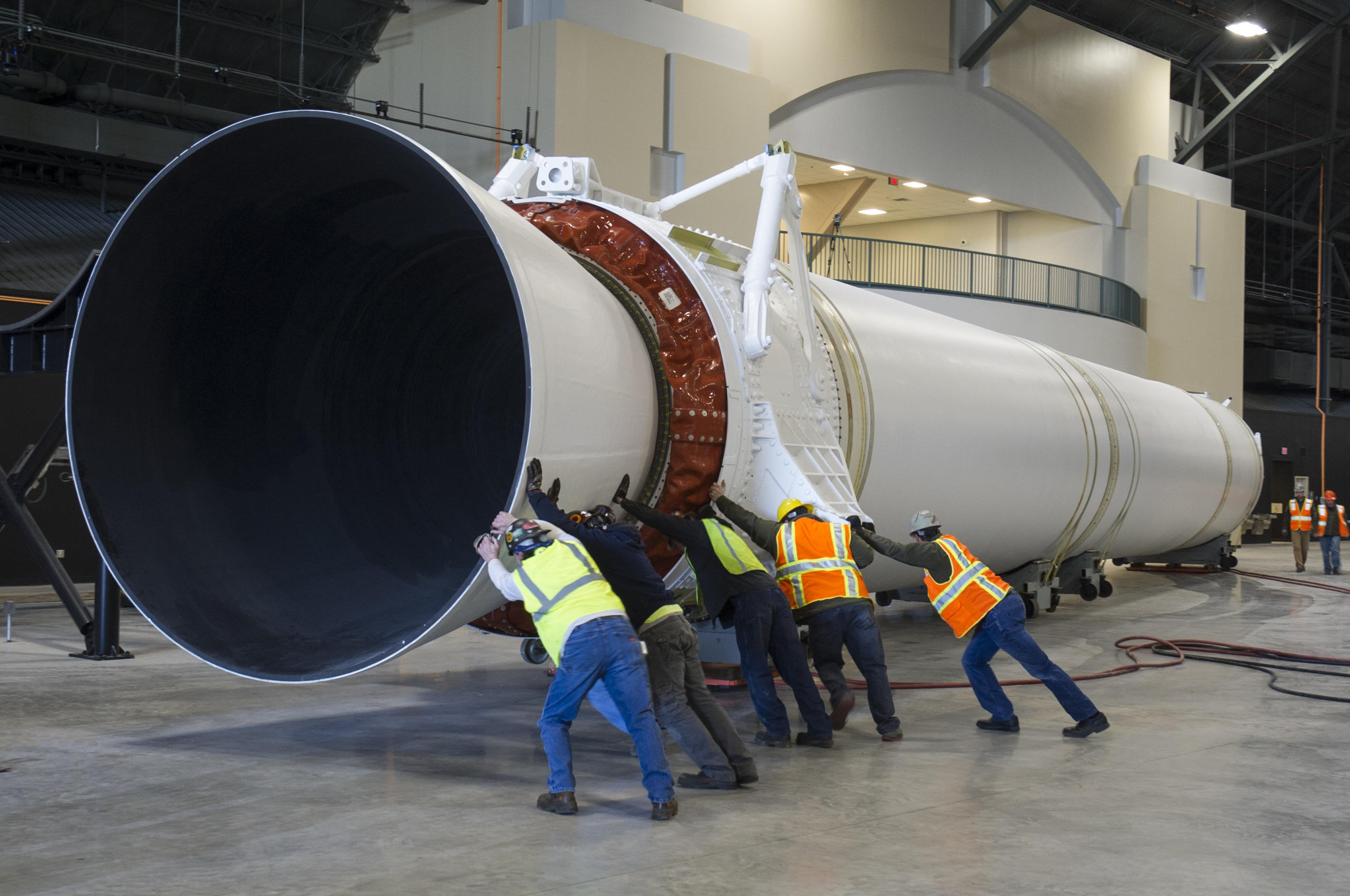
Workers push an SRMU into position

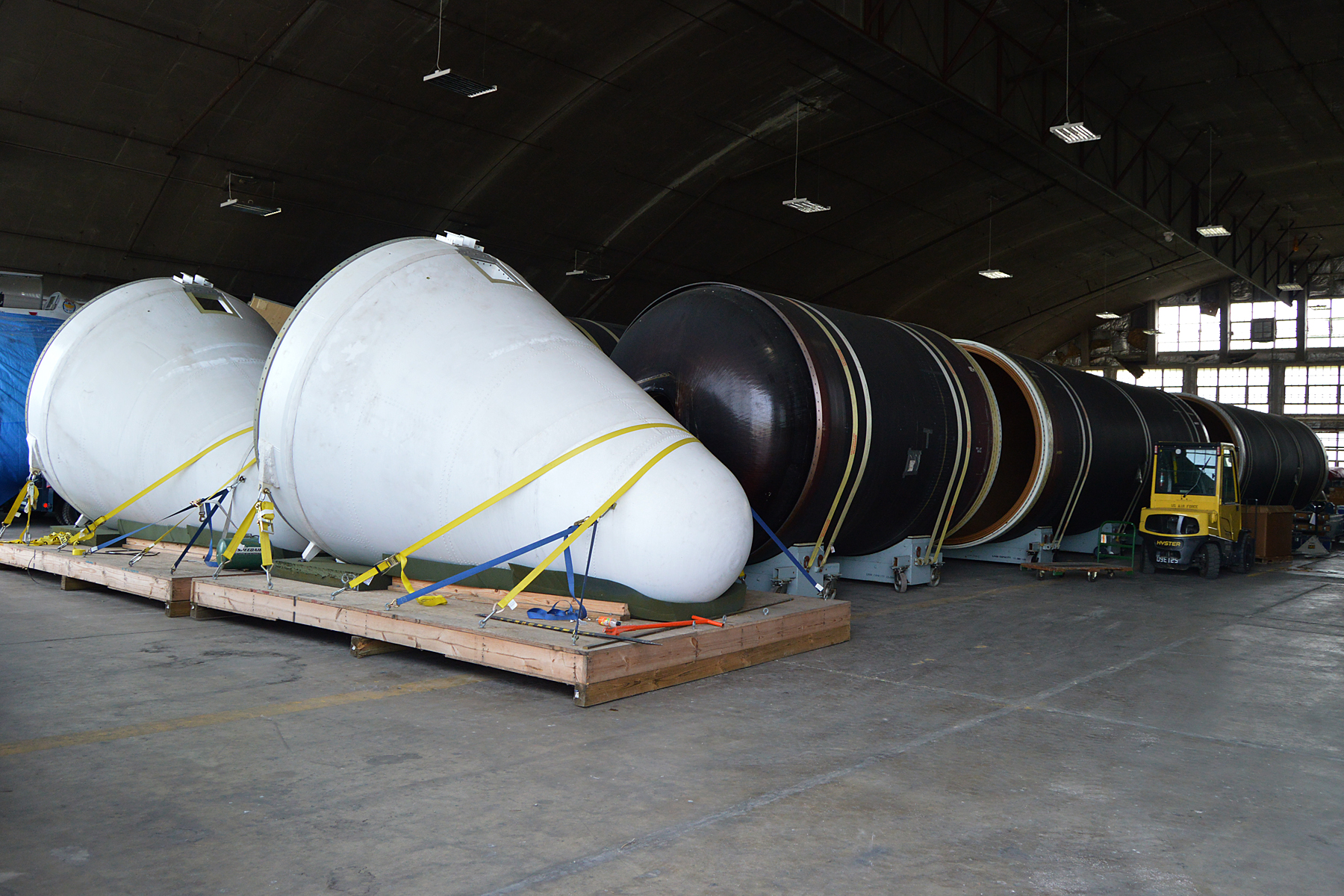
SRMU nosecones and segments

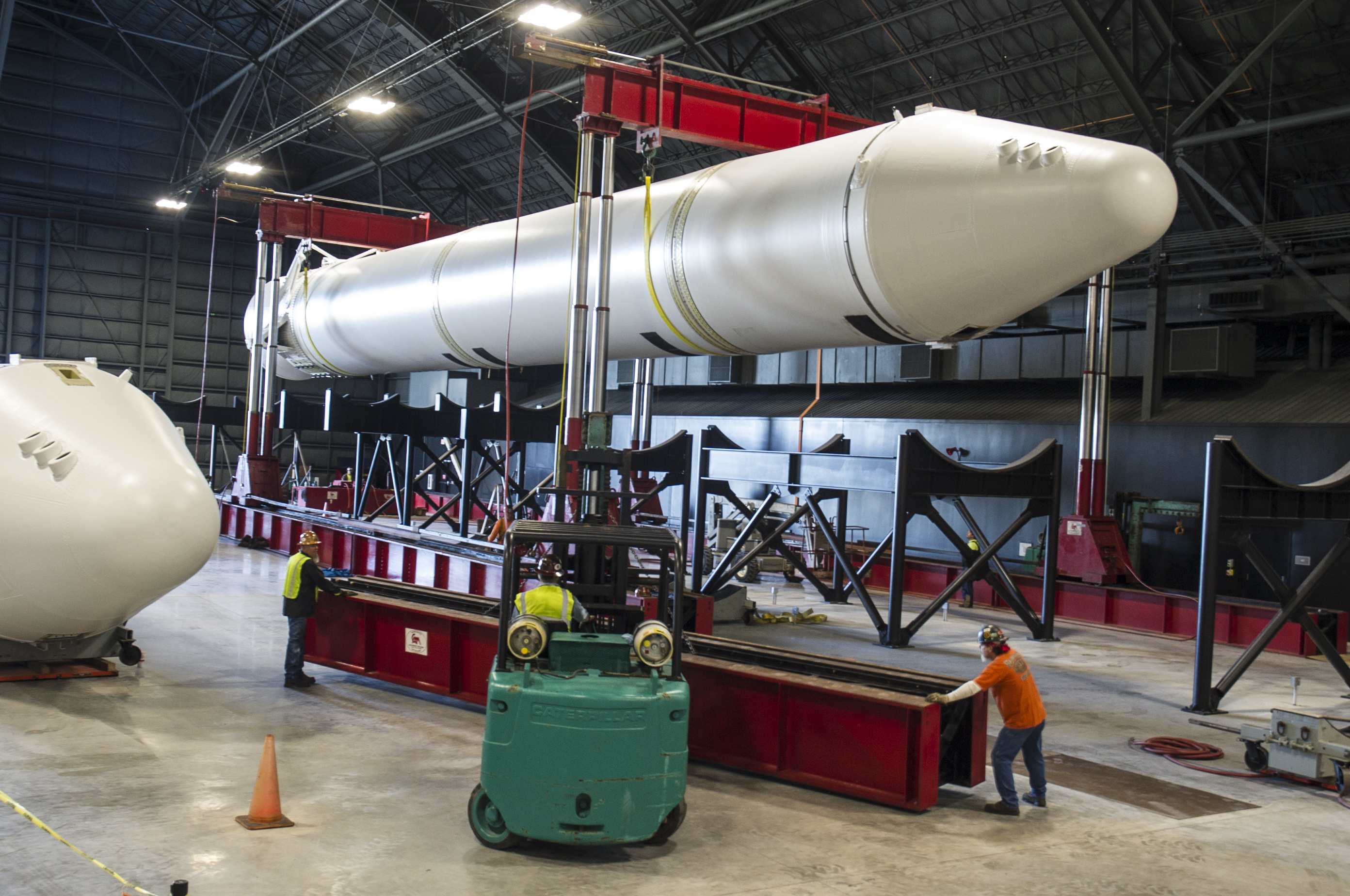
An SRMU on the stand at the Museum of the US Air Force

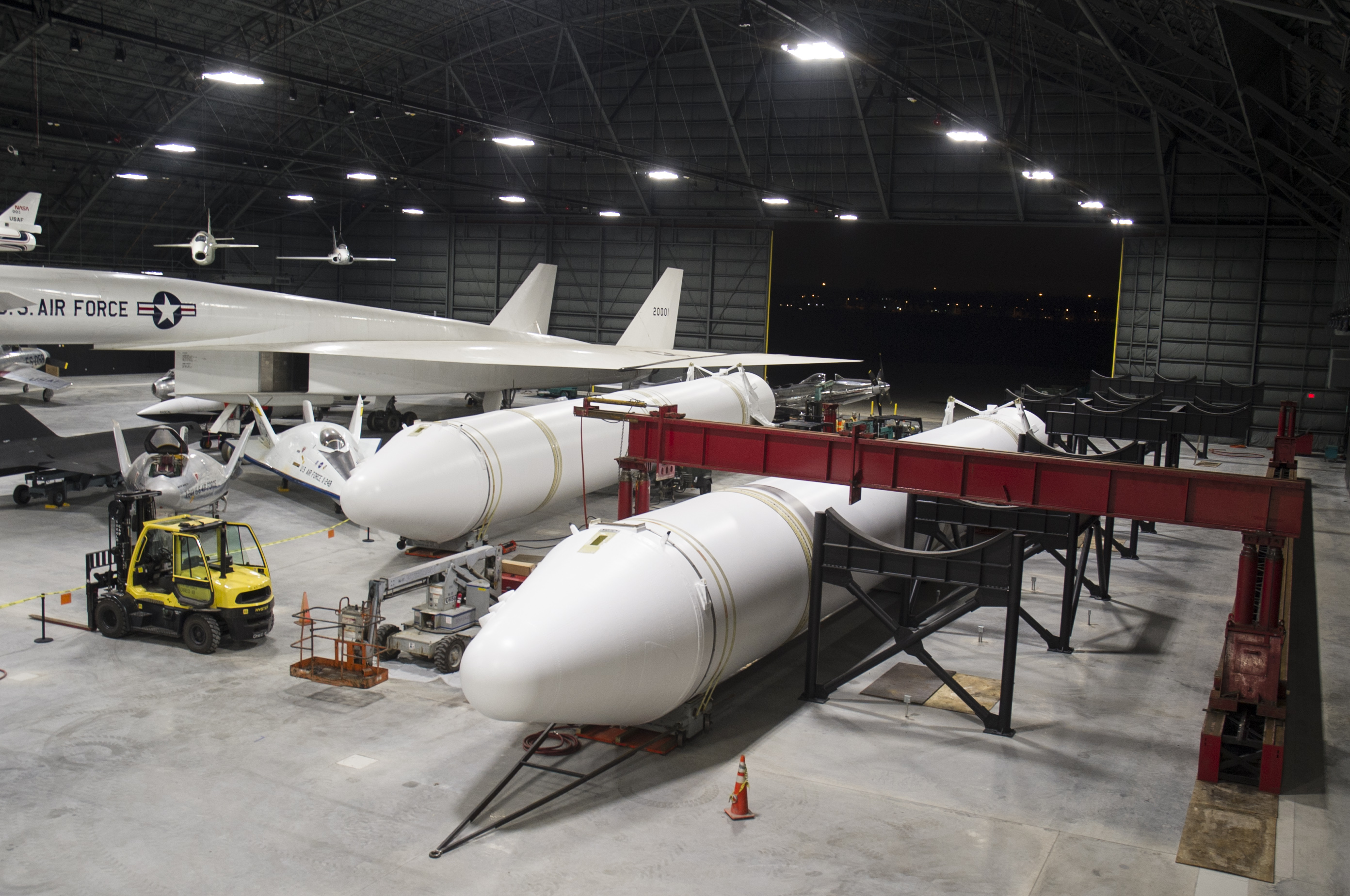
SRMU on display

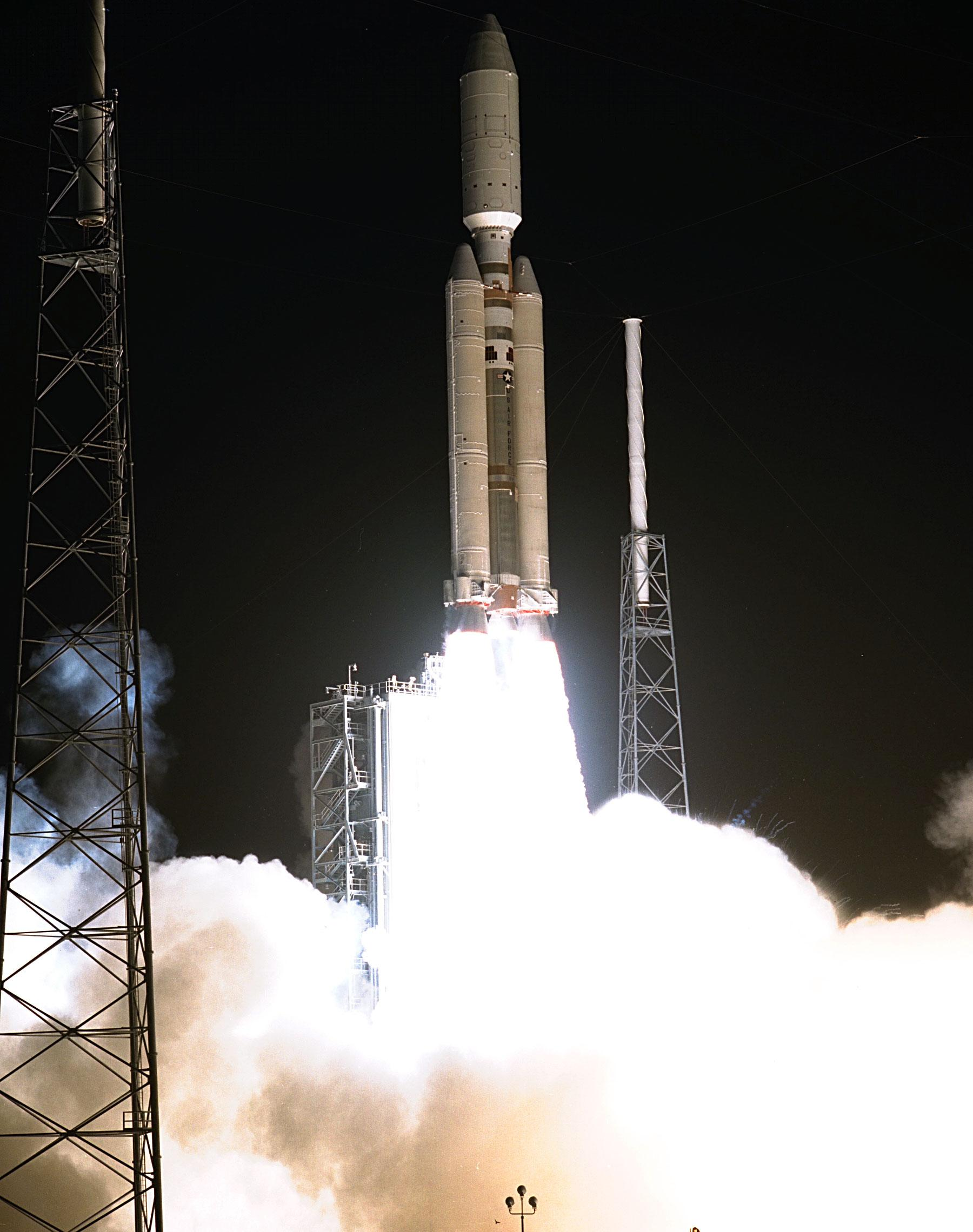
2 SRMU loft Titan IV-B carrying the Cassini-Huygens probe

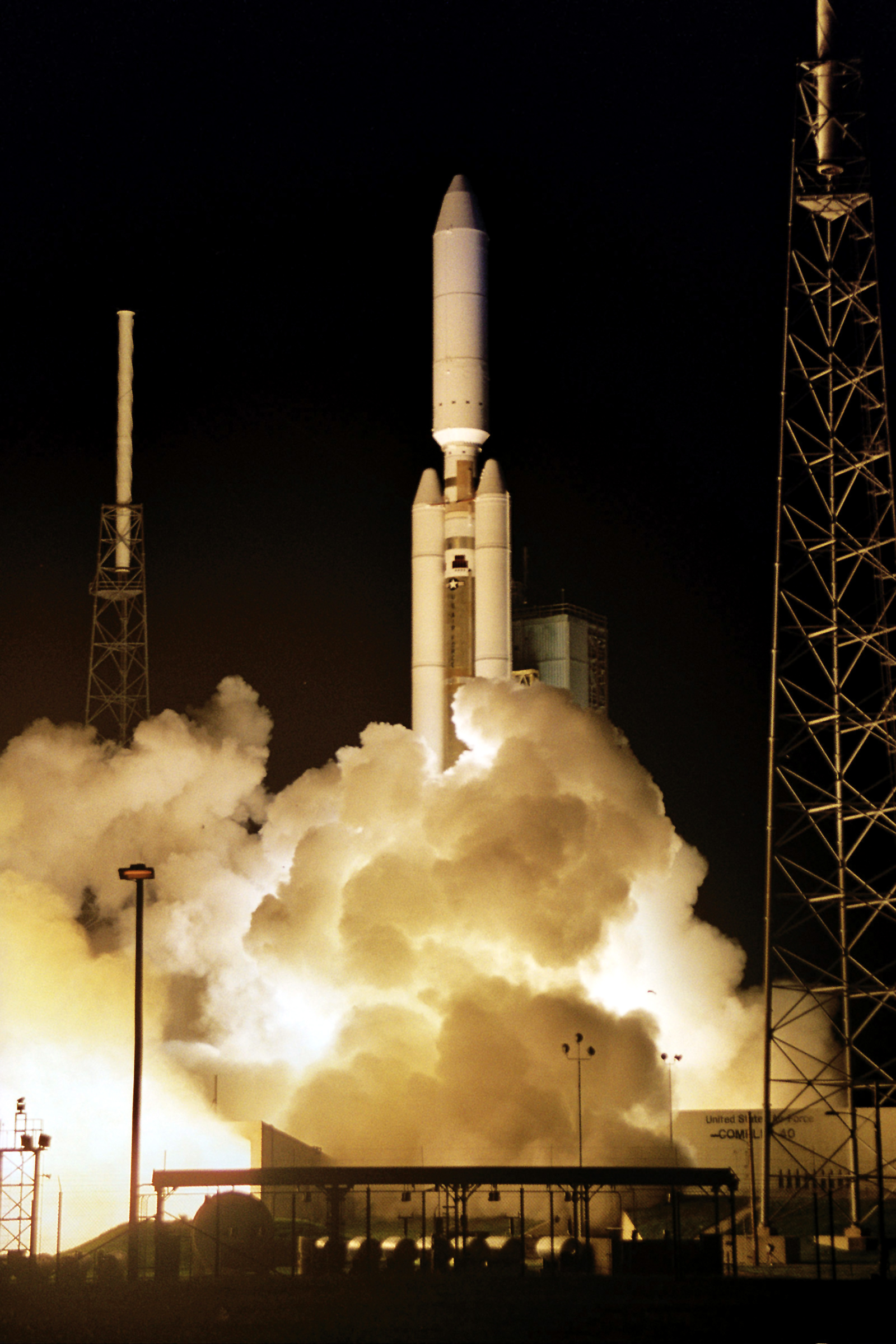
Ignition of SRMU on a military mission (NROL-19)

== See also ==
- Comparison of orbital rocket engines
- Castor (rocket stage) - Castor 600 comparable
- Graphite-Epoxy Motor - contemporary Hercules development using similar technology
