= USA-176 =

American Early warning satellite

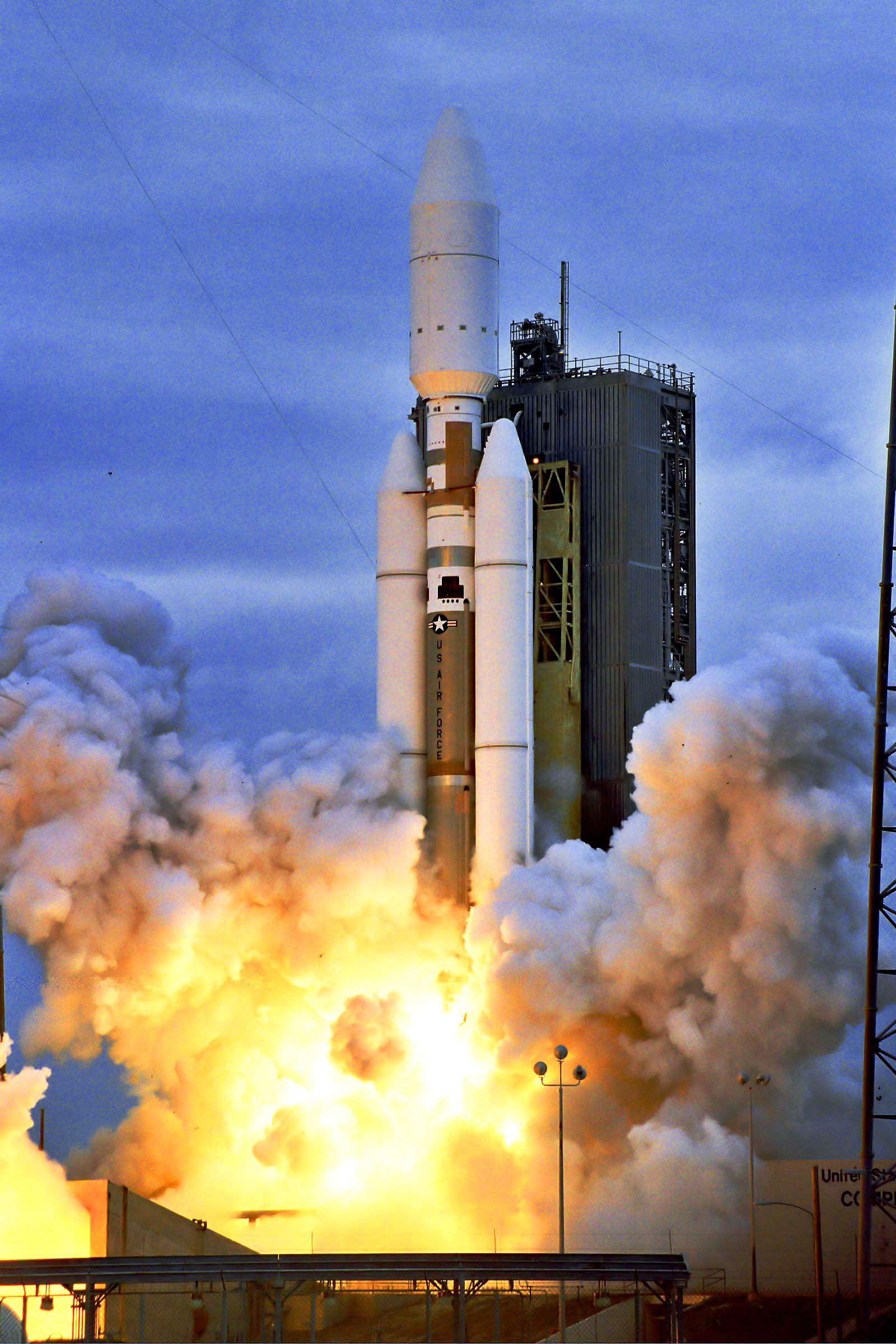
- Launch of USA-176
- Mission type: Early warning
- Operator: United States Air Force
- COSPAR ID: 2004-004A

Spacecraft properties
- Spacecraft type: DSP
- Manufacturer: Northrop Grumman
- Launch mass: 2386 Kg

Start of mission
- Launch date: 14 February 2004 18:50 UTC
- Rocket: Titan IV (402)B/IUS (B-39/IUS-10)
- Launch site: Cape Canaveral, SLC-40
- Contractor: Lockheed Martin

Orbital parameters
- Reference system: Geocentric orbit
- Regime: Geosynchronous orbit

USA-186 (also known as DSP-22) is an American Early warning satellite which was operated by the United States Air Force. Launched in February 2004, it is one of the last DSP Block 3 Early warning satellite.

== Overview ==
The satellite launched on the Last Titan IV (402)B/IUS Version of the Titan IV rocket.

Defense Support Program (DSP) is the Early warning satellite system of USAF which started launches since 1970 and was subsequently replaced by the Space-Based Infrared System (SBIRS) satellite.

== See also ==
- List of USA satellites
