= Titan IV =

Expendable launch system used by the US Air Force

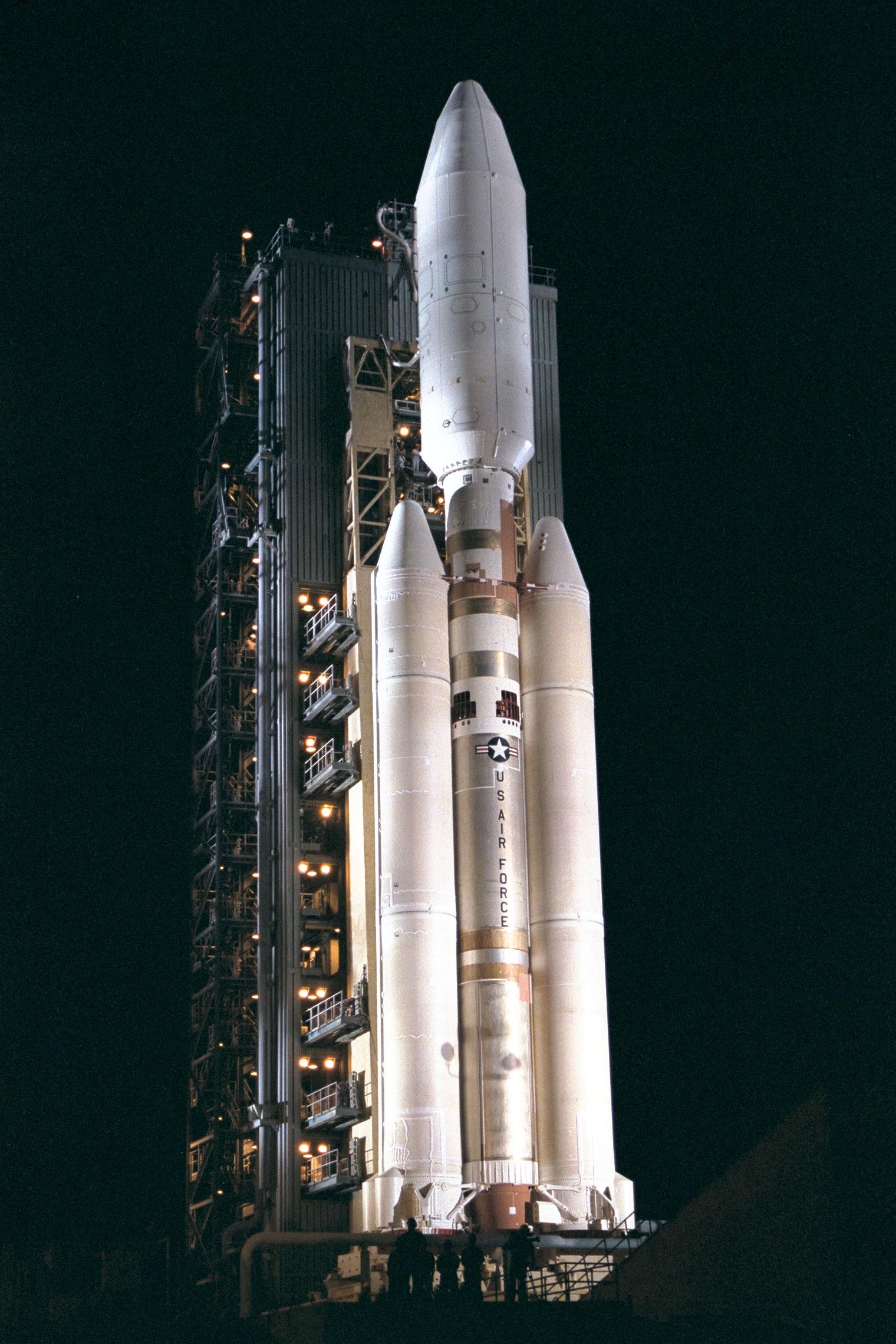
- A Titan IV-B rocket carrying the Cassini-Huygens space research mission before takeoff from Launch Complex 40 on Cape Canaveral, 12 October 1997 (NASA)
- Function: Heavy-lift launch vehicle
- Manufacturer: Lockheed Martin
- Country of origin: United States
- Cost per launch: $432 million (USD)

Size
- Height: 50–63 m (164–207 ft)
- Diameter: 3.05 m (10 ft)
- Mass: 943,050 kg (2,079,060 lb)
- Stages: 3–5

Capacity

Payload to LEO
- Mass: 21,680 kg(47,790 lb)

Payload to Polar LEO
- Mass: 17,600 kg(38,800 lb)

Payload to GSO
- Mass: 5,760 kg(12,690 lb)

Payload to HCO
- Mass: 5,660 kg(12,470 lb)

Associated rockets
- Family: Titan
- Comparable: Atlas V, Delta IV Heavy, Falcon 9

Launch history
- Status: Retired
- Launch sites: Cape Canaveral, SLC‑40 and SLC‑41; Vandenberg, SLC‑4E
- Total launches: 39 (IV-A: 22, IV-B: 17)
- Success(es): 35 (IV-A: 20, IV-B: 15)
- Failure: 4 (IV-A: 2, IV-B: 2)
- First flight: IV-A: 14 June 1989; IV-B: 23 February 1997
- Last flight: IV-A: 12 August 1998; IV-B: 19 October 2005
- Carries passengers or cargo: Lacrosse; DSP; Milstar; Cassini-Huygens

Boosters (IV-A) – UA1207
- No. boosters: 2
- Maximum thrust: 14.234 MN (3,200,000 lbf)
- Specific impulse: 272 seconds (2667 N·s/kg)
- Burn time: 120 seconds
- Propellant: PBAN

Boosters (IV-B) – SRMU
- No. boosters: 2
- Maximum thrust: 15.12 MN (3,400,000 lbf)
- Specific impulse: 286 seconds (2805 N·s/kg)
- Burn time: 140 seconds
- Propellant: HTPB

First stage
- Powered by: 2 × LR87-AJ-11
- Maximum thrust: 2,438 kN (548,000 lb_{f})
- Specific impulse: 302 s (2.96 km/s)
- Burn time: 164 seconds
- Propellant: N_{2}O_{4} / Aerozine 50

Second stage
- Powered by: 1 × LR91-AJ-11
- Maximum thrust: 467 kN (105,000 lb_{f})
- Specific impulse: 316 s (3.10 km/s)
- Burn time: 223 seconds
- Propellant: N_{2}O_{4} / Aerozine 50

Third stage (Optional) – Centaur D-1T
- Powered by: 2 × RL10A-3-3A
- Maximum thrust: 147 kN (33,100 lb_{f})
- Specific impulse: 444 s (4.35 km/s)
- Burn time: 625 seconds
- Propellant: LH_{2} / LOX

Titan IV was a family of heavy-lift space launch vehicles developed by Martin Marietta and operated by the United States Air Force from 1989 to 2005. Launches were conducted from Space Launch Complex 40 and 41 at Cape Canaveral Air Force Station in Florida and Space Launch Complex 4E at Vandenberg Air Force Base in California.

The Titan IV was the last of the Titan family of rockets, originally developed by the Glenn L. Martin Company in 1958. It was retired in 2005 due to their high cost of operation and concerns over its toxic hypergolic propellants, and replaced with the Atlas V and Delta IV launch vehicles under the EELV program. The final launch (B-30) from Cape Canaveral occurred on 29 April 2005, and the final launch from Vandenberg AFB occurred on 19 October 2005. Lockheed Martin Space Systems built the Titan IVs near Denver, Colorado, under contract to the US government.

Two Titan IV vehicles are on display, at the National Museum of the United States Air Force in Dayton, Ohio and the Evergreen Aviation and Space Museum in McMinnville, Oregon.

== Vehicle description ==
The Titan IV was developed to provide assured capability to launch Space Shuttle–class payloads for the Air Force. The Titan IV could be launched with no third stage, the Inertial Upper Stage (IUS), or the Centaur upper stage.

The Titan IV was made up of two large solid-fuel rocket boosters and a two-stage liquid-fueled core. The two storable liquid fuel core stages used Aerozine 50 fuel and nitrogen tetroxide oxidizer. These propellants are hypergolic, igniting on contact, and are liquids at room temperature, so no tank insulation is needed. This allowed the launcher to be stored in a ready state for extended periods, but both propellants are extremely toxic.

The Titan IV could be launched from either coast: SLC-40 or 41 at Cape Canaveral Air Force Station near Cocoa Beach, Florida and at SLC-4E, at Vandenberg Air Force Base launch sites 55 miles northwest of Santa Barbara California. Launches to polar orbits occurred from Vandenberg, with most other launches taking place at Cape Canaveral.

=== Titan IV-A ===
Titan IV-A flew with steel-cased solid UA1207 rocket motors (SRMs) produced by Chemical Systems Division.

=== Titan IV-B ===
The Titan IV-B evolved from the Titan III family and was similar to the Titan 34D.

While the launcher family had an extremely good reliability record in its first two decades, this changed in the 1980s with the loss of a Titan 34D in 1985 followed by the disastrous explosion of another in 1986 due to a SRM failure. Due to this, the Titan IV-B vehicle was intended to use the new composite-casing Upgraded Solid Rocket Motors. Due to development problems the first few Titan IV-B launches flew with the old-style UA1207 SRMs.

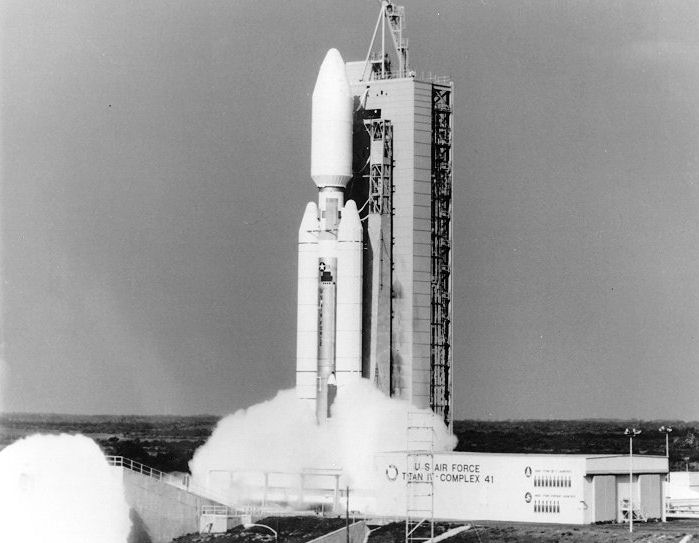
Titan IV-A

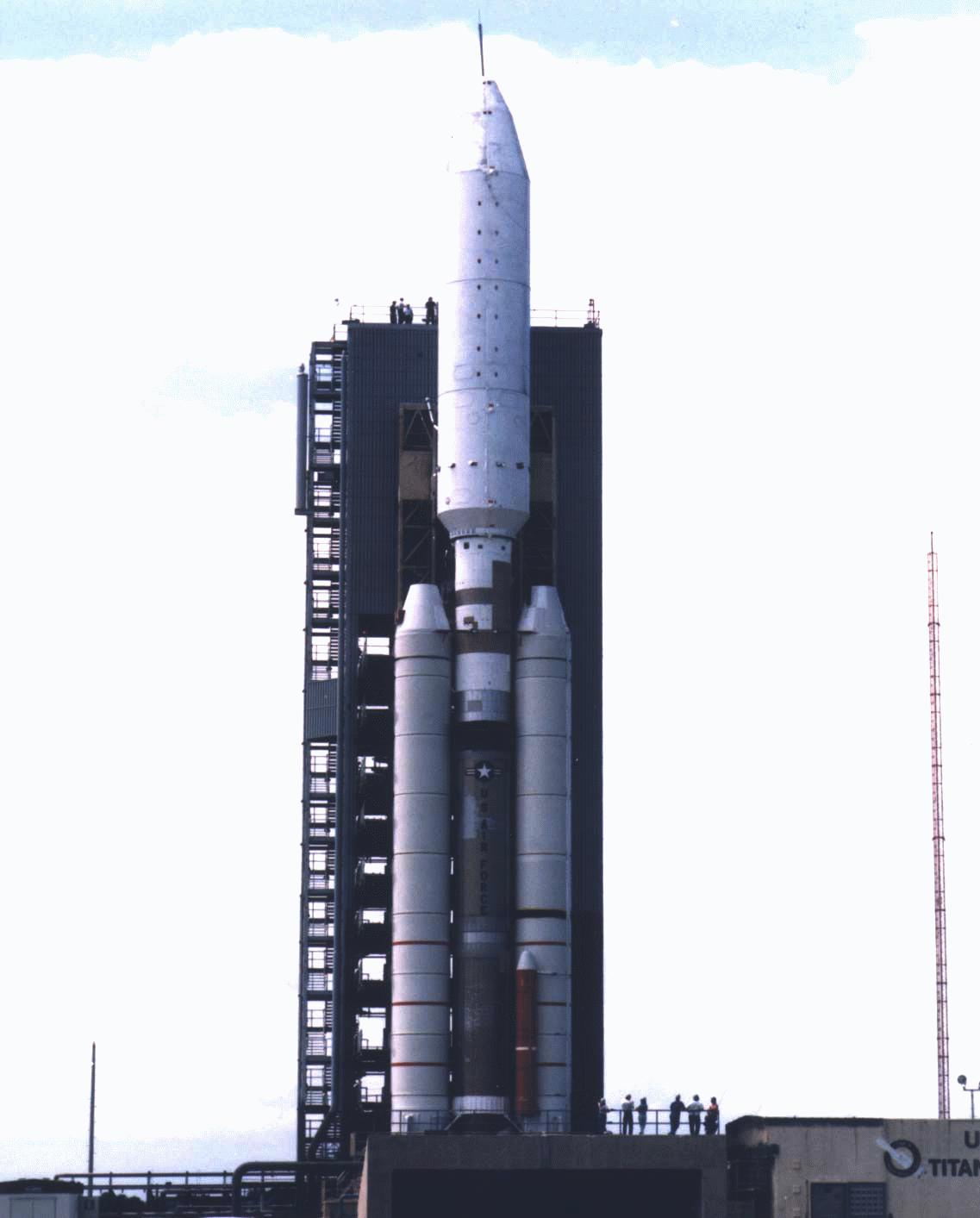
Titan-4(01)A Centaur

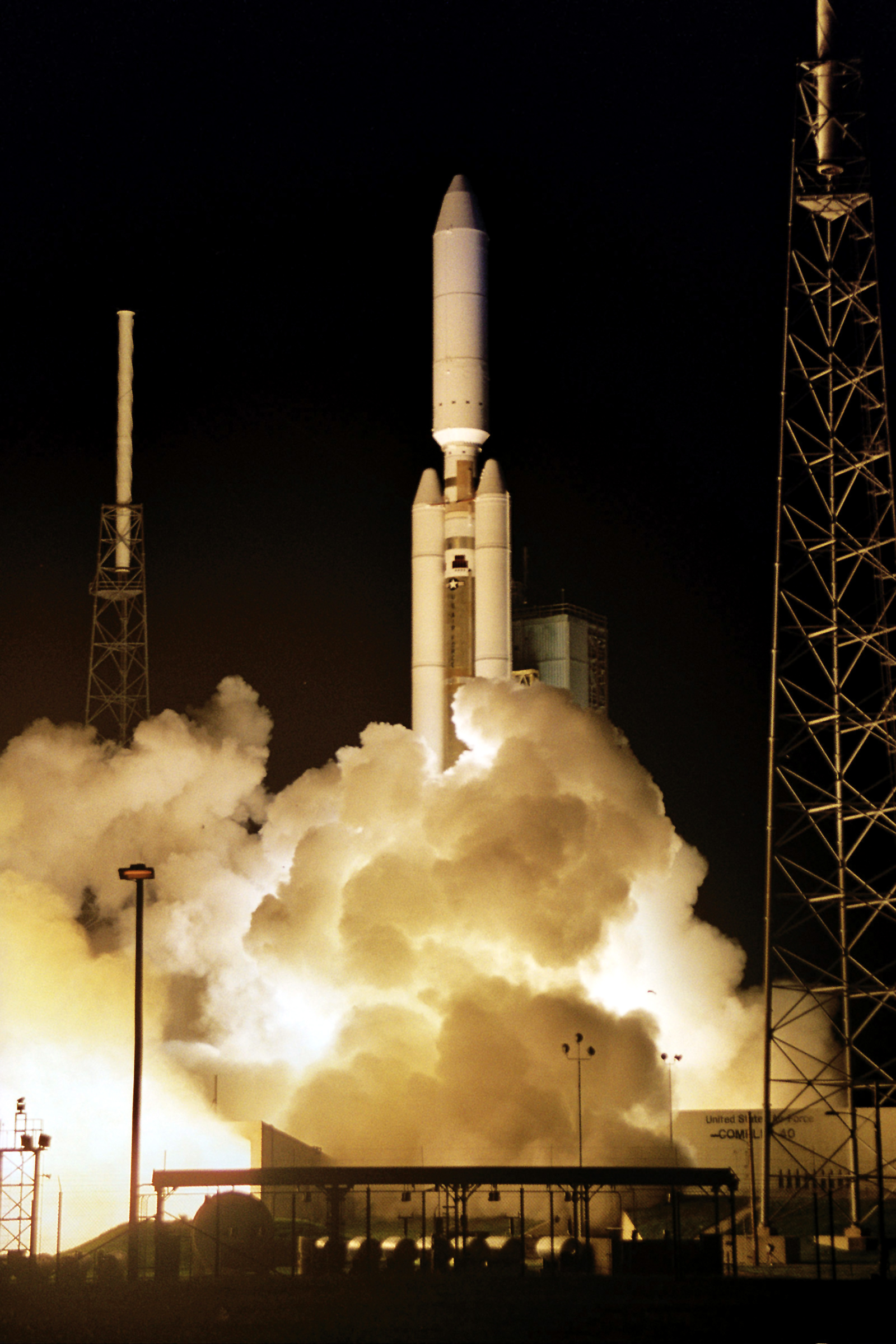
Titan IV-B Centaur

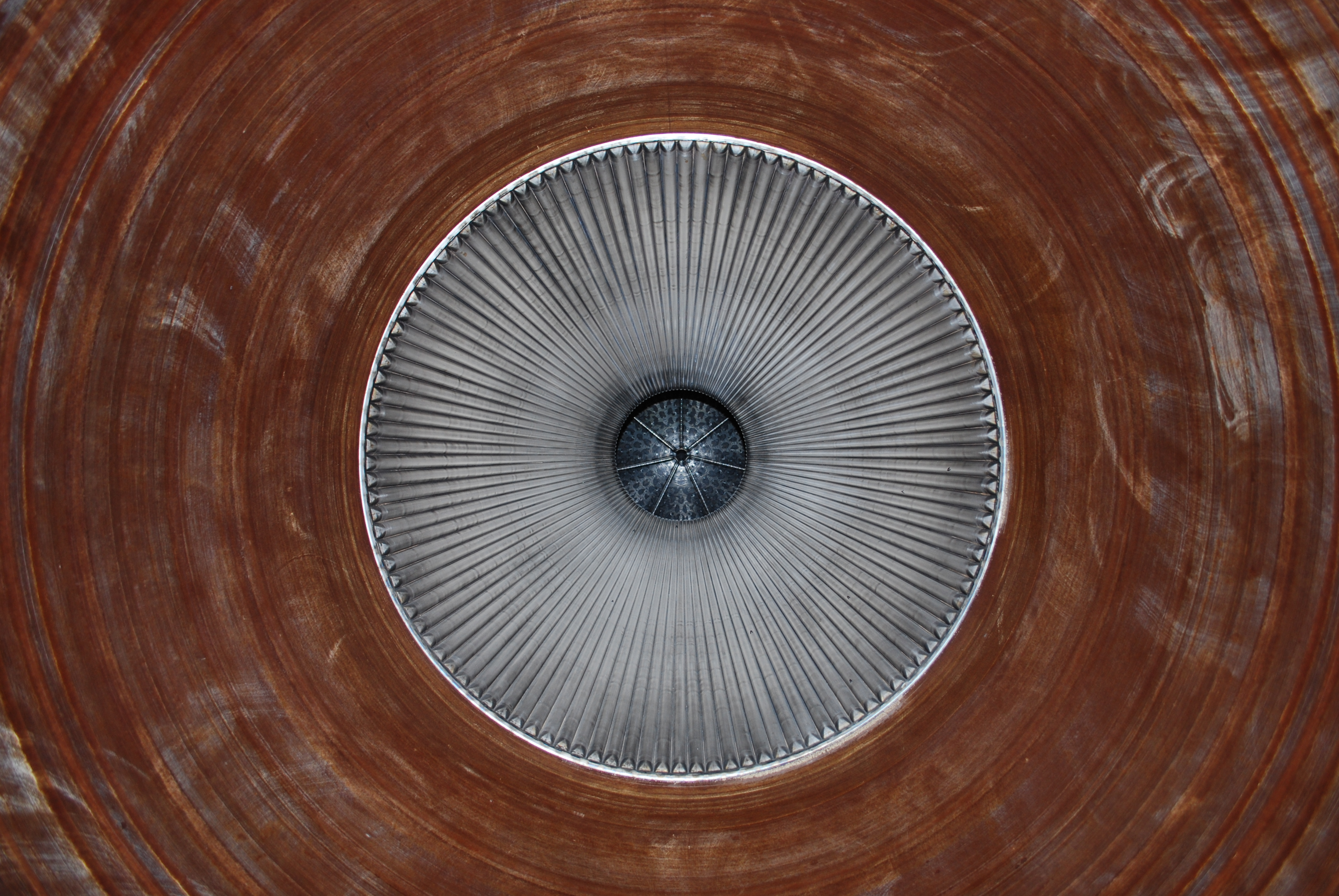
LR91-AJ-11 rocket engine thrust chamber and injector

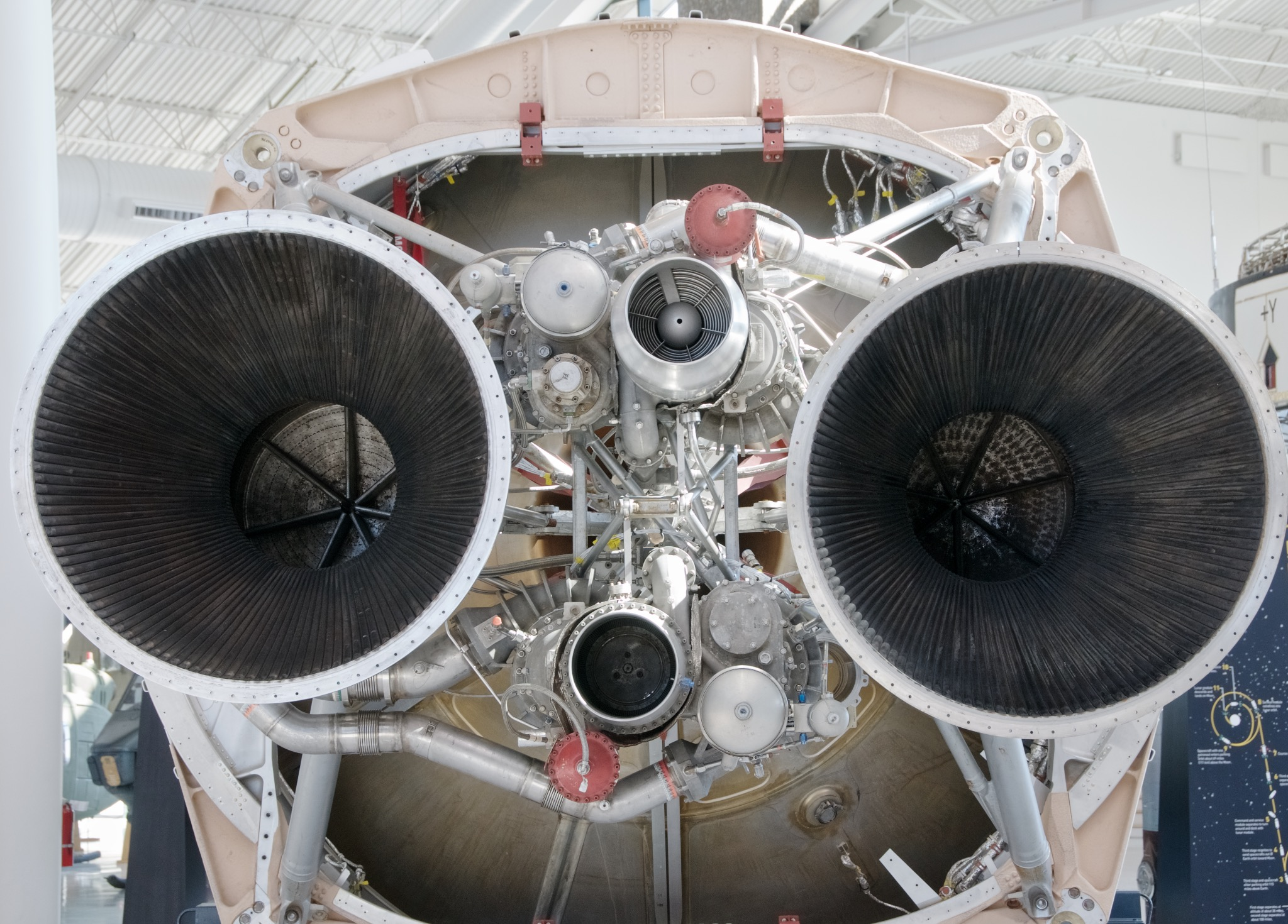
Bottom of first stage of Titan IV-B rocket

=== General characteristics ===
- Builder: Lockheed-Martin Astronautics
- Power Plant:
  - Stage 0 consisted of two solid-rocket motors.
  - Stage 1 used an LR87-AJ-11 liquid-propellant rocket engine.
  - Stage 2 used the LR91-AJ-11 liquid-propellant engine.
  - Optional upper stages included the Centaur and Inertial Upper Stage.
- Guidance System: A ring laser gyro guidance system manufactured by Honeywell.
- Thrust:
  - Stage 0: Solid rocket motors provided 1.7 million pounds force (7.56 MN) per motor at liftoff.
  - Stage 1: LR87-AJ-11 provided an average of 548,000 pounds force (2.44 MN)
  - Stage 2: LR91-AJ-11 provided an average of 105,000 pounds force (467 kN).
  - Optional Centaur (RL10A-3-3A) upper stage provided 33,100 pounds force (147 kN) and the Inertial Upper Stage provided up to 41,500 pounds force (185 kN).
- Length: Up to 204 feet (62 m)
- Lift Capability:
  - Could carry up to 47,800 pounds (21,700 kg) into low Earth orbit
  - up to 12,700 pounds (5,800 kg) into a geosynchronous orbit when launched from Cape Canaveral AFS, Fla.;
  - and up to 38,800 pounds (17,600 kg) into a low Earth polar orbit when launched from Vandenberg AFB.
  - into geosynchronous orbit:
    - with Centaur upper stage 12,700 pounds (5,800 kg)
    - with Inertial Upper Stage 5,250 pounds (2,380 kg)
- Payload fairing:
  - Manufacturer: McDonnell Douglas Space Systems Co
  - Diameter: 16.7 feet (5.1 m)
  - Length: 56, 66, 76, or 86 ft
  - Mass: 11,000, 12,000, 13,000, or 14,000 lb
  - Design: 3 sections, isogrid structure, Aluminum
- Maximum Takeoff Weight: Approximately 2.2 million pounds (1,000,000 kg)
- Cost: Approximately $250–350 million, depending on launch configuration.
- Date deployed: June 1989
- Launch sites: Cape Canaveral AFS, Fla., and Vandenberg AFB, Calif.

=== Upgrades ===
==== Solid Rocket Motor Upgrade test stand ====
In 1988–89, The Ralph M. Parsons Company designed and built a full-scale steel tower and deflector facility, which was used to test the Titan IV Solid Rocket Motor Upgrade (SRMU). The launch and the effect of the SRMU thrust force on the Titan IV vehicle were modeled. To evaluate the magnitude of the thrust force, the SRMU was connected to the steel tower through load measurement systems and launched in-place. It was the first full-scale test conducted to simulate the effects of the SRMU on the Titan IV vehicle.

==== Proposed aluminum-lithium tanks ====
In the early 1980s, General Dynamics developed a plan to assemble a lunar landing spacecraft in-orbit under the name Early Lunar Access. A Space Shuttle would lift a lunar lander into orbit and then a Titan IV rocket would launch with a modified Centaur G-Prime stage to rendezvous and dock. The plan required upgrading the Space Shuttle and Titan IV to use lighter aluminium-lithium alloy propellant tanks. The plan never came to fruition, but in the 1990s the Shuttle's External Tank was converted to aluminum-lithium tanks to rendezvous with the highly inclined orbit of the Russian Mir Space Station.

== Type identification ==
The IV-A (40nA) used boosters with steel casings, the IV-B (40nB) used boosters with composite casings (the SRMU).

Type 401 used a Centaur 3rd stage, type 402 used an IUS 3rd stage. The other 3 types (without 3rd stages) were 403, 404, and 405:

- Type 403 featured no upper stage, for lower-mass payloads to higher orbits from Vandenberg.
- Type 404 featured no upper stage, for heavier payloads to low orbits, from Vandenberg.
- Type 405 featured no upper stage, for lower-mass payloads to higher-orbit from Cape Canaveral.

== History ==
Interactive 3D model of the Titan IV, fully assembled (left) and in exploded view (right)

The Titan rocket family was established in October 1955 when the Air Force awarded the Glenn L. Martin Company (later Martin-Marietta, now part of Lockheed Martin) a contract to build an intercontinental ballistic missile (SM-68). The resulting Titan I was the nation's first two-stage ICBM and complemented the Atlas ICBM as the second underground, vertically stored, silo-based ICBM. Both stages of the Titan I used liquid oxygen and RP-1 as propellants.

A subsequent version of the Titan family, the Titan II, was a two-stage evolution of the Titan I, but was much more powerful and used different propellants. Designated as LGM-25C, the Titan II was the largest missile developed for the USAF at that time. The Titan II had newly developed engines which used Aerozine 50 and nitrogen tetroxide as fuel and oxidizer in a self-igniting, hypergolic propellant combination, allowing the Titan II to be stored underground ready to launch. Titan II was the first Titan vehicle to be used as a space launcher.

Development of the space launch only Titan III began in 1964, resulting in the Titan IIIA, eventually followed by the Titan IV-A and IV-B.

=== CELV ===
By the mid-1980s the United States government worried that the Space Shuttle, designed to launch all American payloads and replace all unmanned rockets, would not be reliable enough for military and classified missions. In 1984 Under Secretary of the Air Force and Director of the National Reconnaissance Office (NRO) Pete Aldridge decided to purchase Complementary Expendable Launch Vehicles (CELV) for ten NRO payloads; the name came from the government's expectation that the rockets would "complement" the shuttle. Later renamed Titan IV, the rocket would only carry three military payloads paired with Centaur stages and fly exclusively from LC-41 at Cape Canaveral. However, the Challenger accident in 1986 caused a renewed dependence on expendable launch systems, with the Titan IV program significantly expanded. At the time of its introduction, the Titan IV was the largest and most capable expendable launch vehicle used by the USAF.

The post-Challenger program added Titan IV versions with the Inertial Upper Stage (IUS) or no upper stages, increased the number of flights, and converted LC-40 at the Cape for Titan IV launches. As of 1991, almost forty total Titan IV launches were scheduled and a new, improved SRM (solid rocket motor) casing using lightweight composite materials was introduced.

=== Program cost ===
In 1990, the Titan IV Selected Acquisition Report estimated the total cost for the acquisition of 65 Titan IV vehicles over a period of 16 years to US$18.3 billion (inflation-adjusted US$ 45.1 billion in 2025).

=== Cassini–Huygens launch ===
In October 1997, a Titan IV-B rocket launched Cassini–Huygens, a pair of probes sent to Saturn. It was the only use of a Titan IV for a non-Department of Defense launch. Huygens landed on Titan on January 14, 2005. Cassini remained in orbit around Saturn. The Cassini Mission ended on September 15, 2017, when the spacecraft was sent into Saturn's atmosphere to burn up.

=== Retirement ===
While an improvement over the shuttle, the Titan IV was expensive and unreliable. By the 1990s, there were also growing safety concerns over its toxic propellants. The Evolved Expendable Launch Vehicle (EELV) program resulted in the development of the Atlas V, Delta IV, and Delta IV Heavy launch vehicles, which replaced Titan IV and a number of other legacy launch systems. The new EELVs eliminated the use of hypergolic propellants, reduced costs, and were much more versatile than the legacy vehicles.

=== Surviving examples ===
In 2014, the National Museum of the United States Air Force in Dayton, Ohio, began a project to restore a Titan IV-B rocket. This effort was successful, with the display opening June 8, 2016. The only other surviving Titan IV components are at the Wings Over the Rockies Air and Space Museum in Denver, Colorado which has two Titan Stage 1 engines, one Titan Stage 2 engine, and the interstage ‘skirt’ on outdoor display; and at the Evergreen Aviation and Space Museum in McMinnville, Oregon, including the core stages and parts of the solid rocket motor assembly.

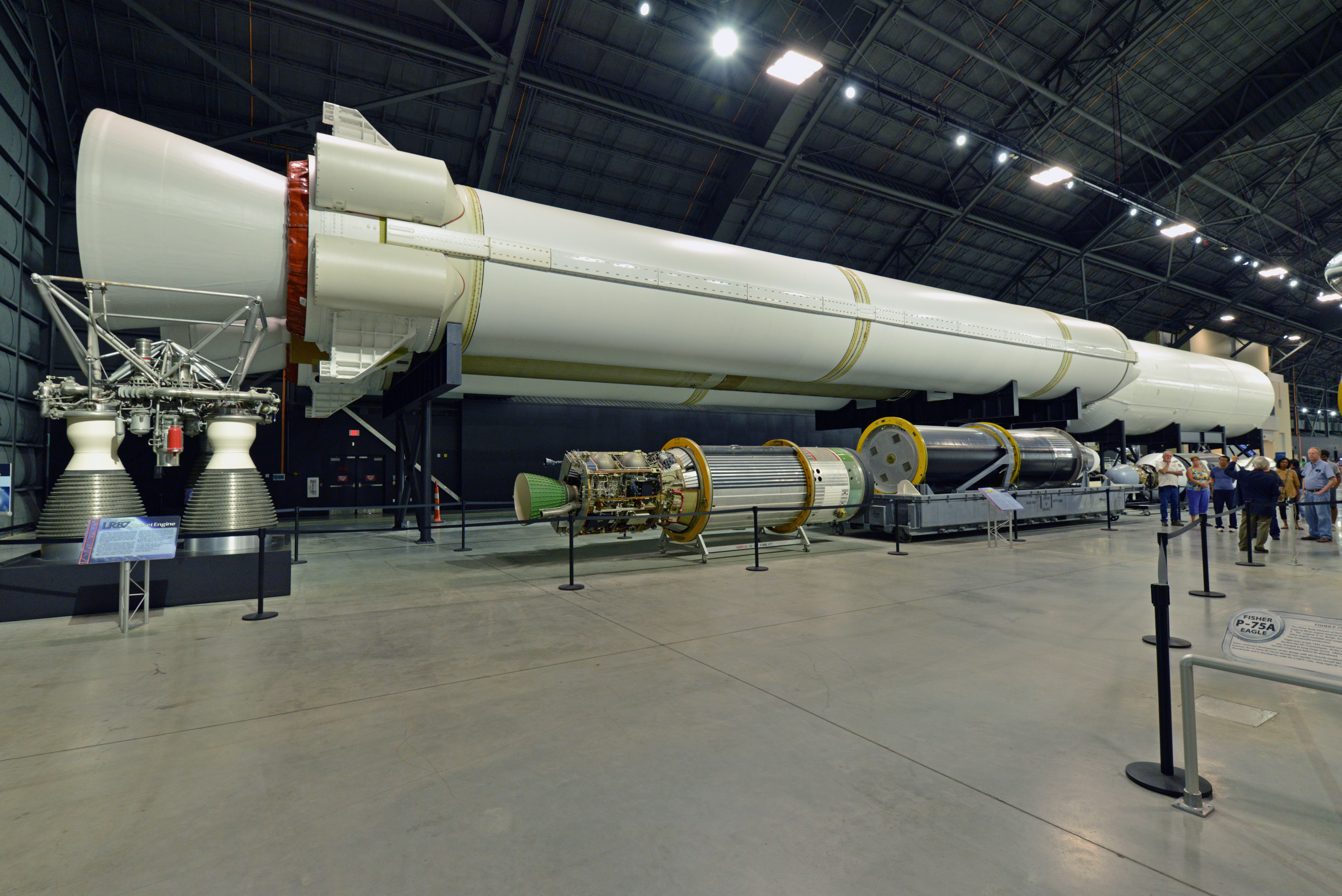
Titan IV-B in the National Museum of the United States Air Force

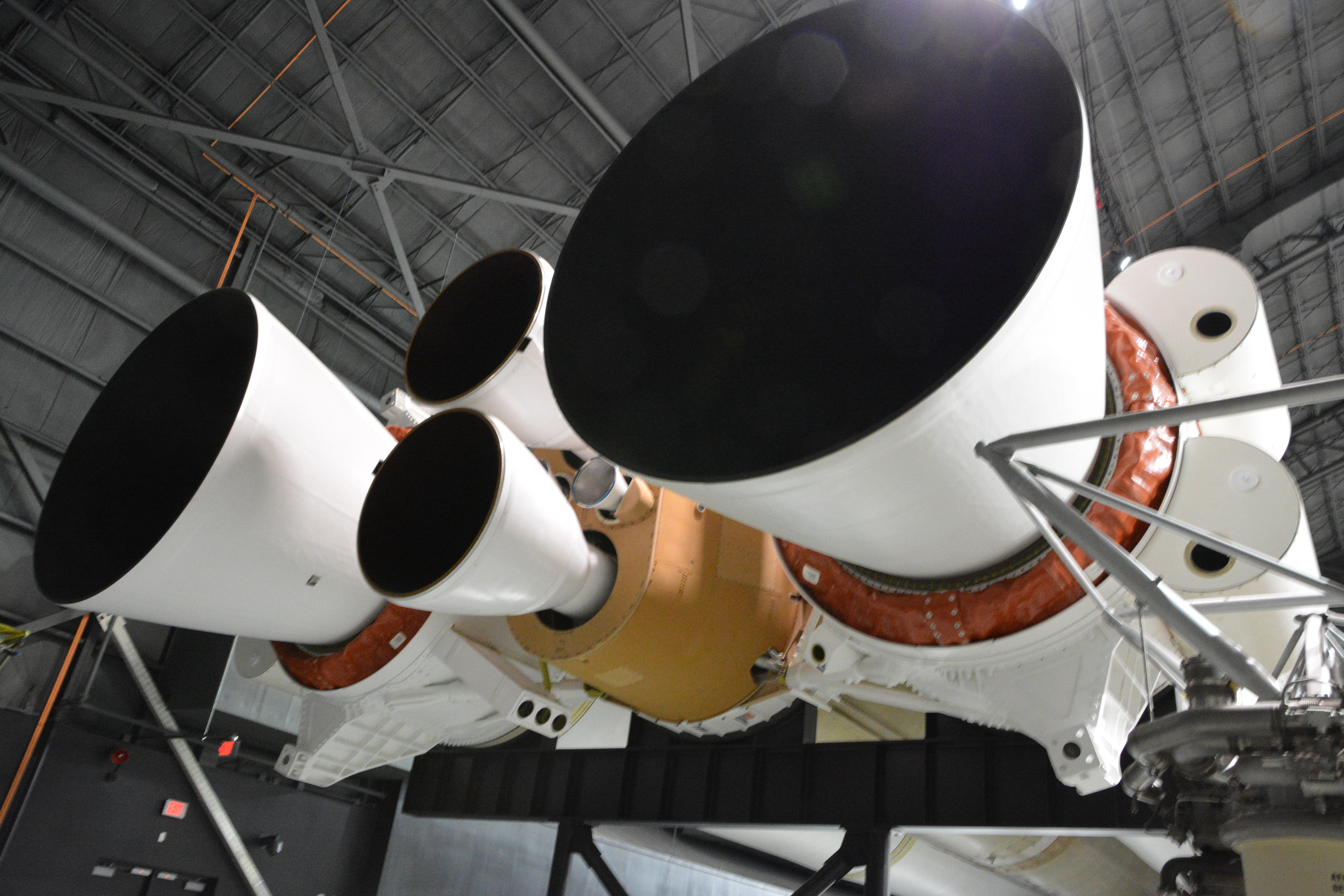
Titan IV-B in the National Museum of the United States Air Force

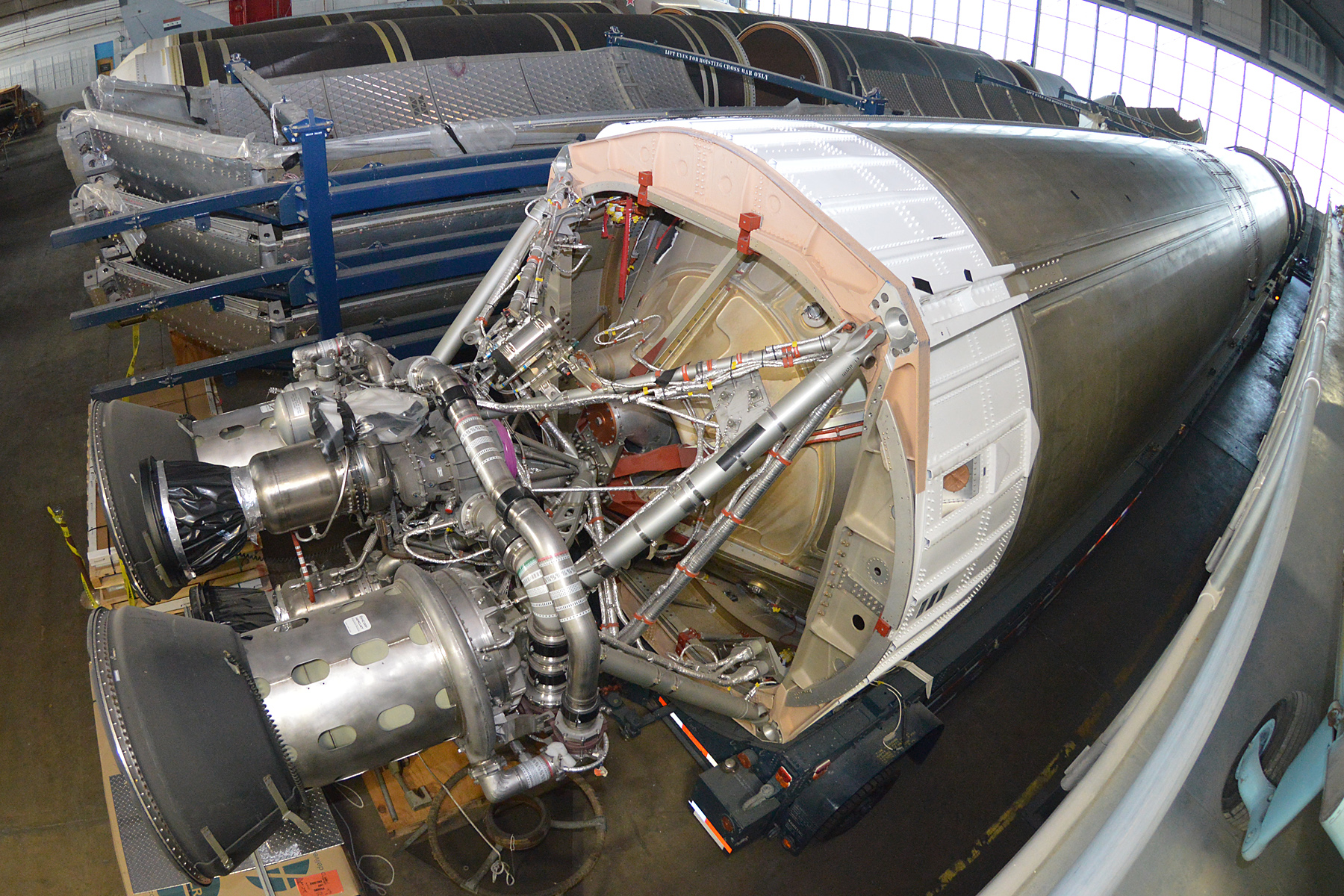
Titan IV-B in the restoration hangar at the National Museum of the United States Air Force. This is Stage One aft with two Aerojet LR87-AJ-11 engines.

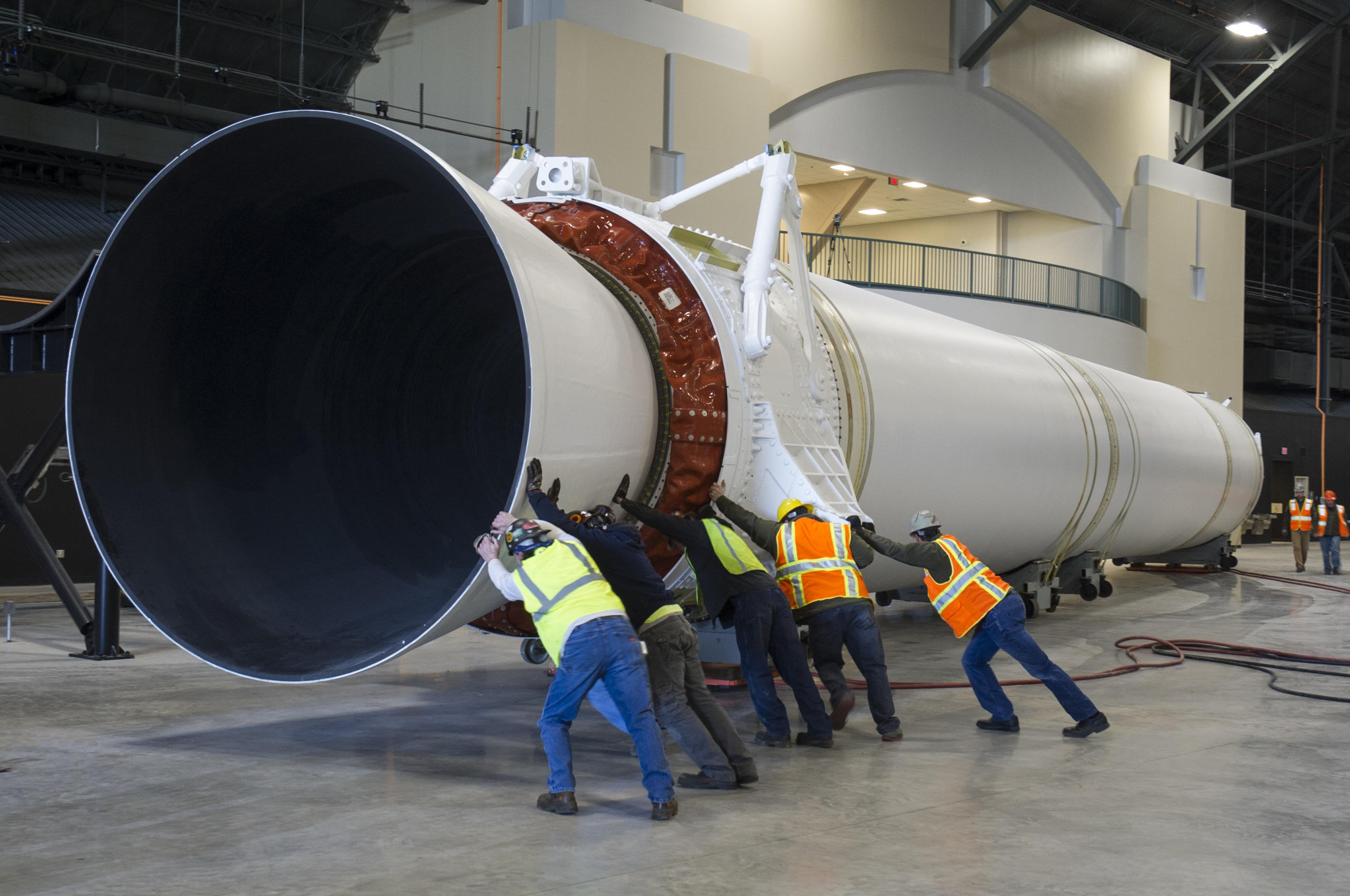
Titan IV-B stage one and SRMU's at the National Museum of the United States Air Force

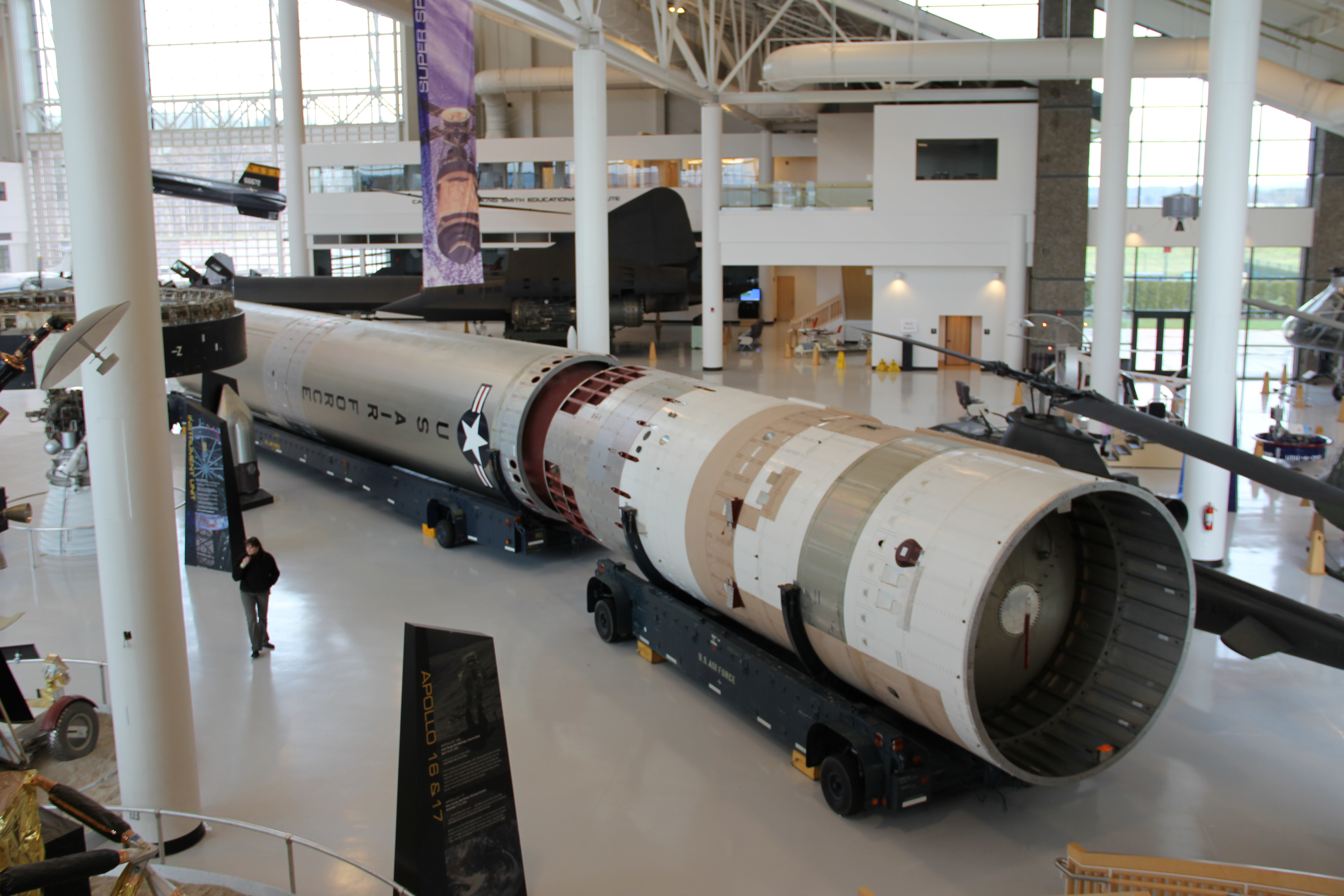
Titan IV-B at the Evergreen Aviation and Space Museum

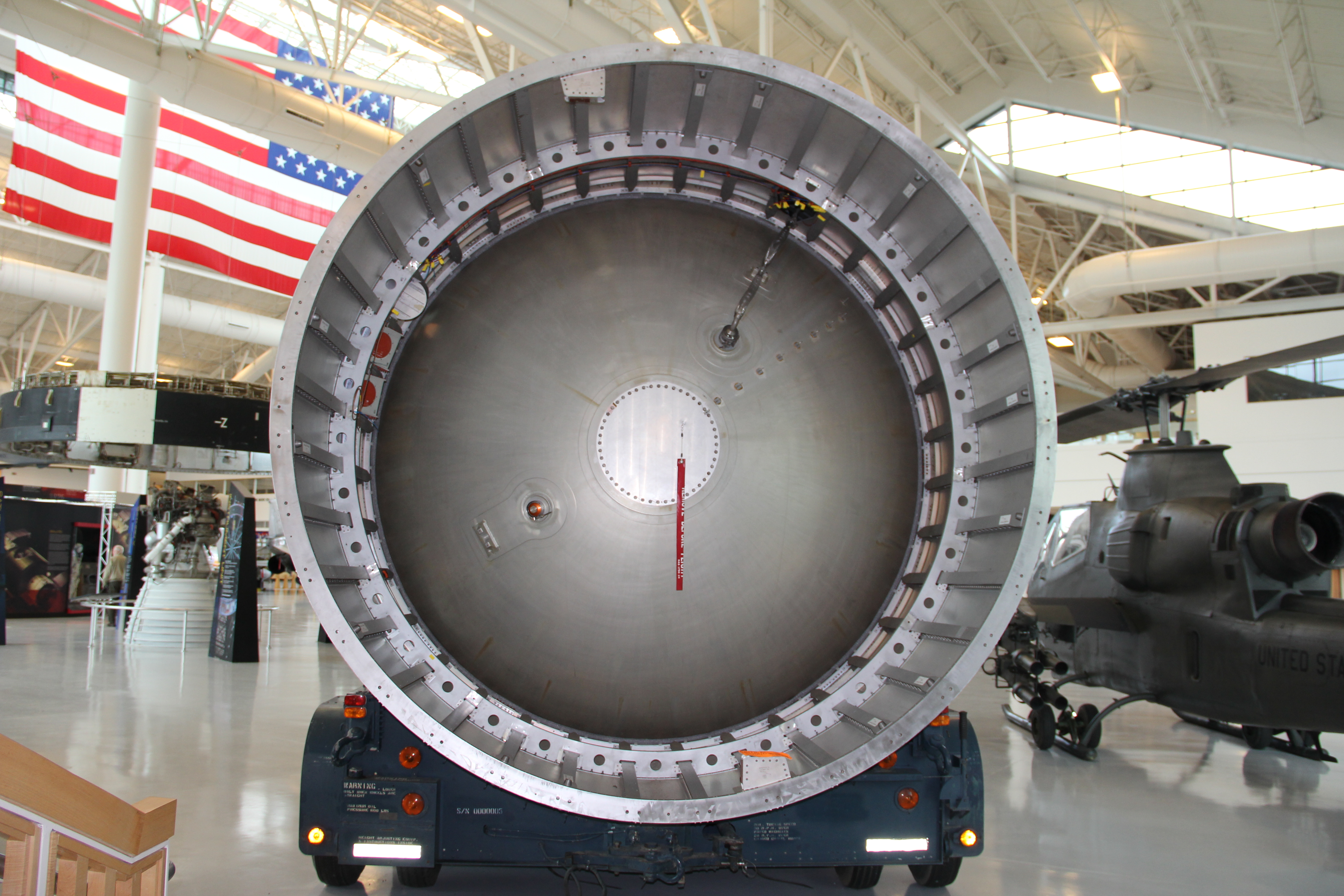
Titan IV-B at the Evergreen Aviation and Space Museum

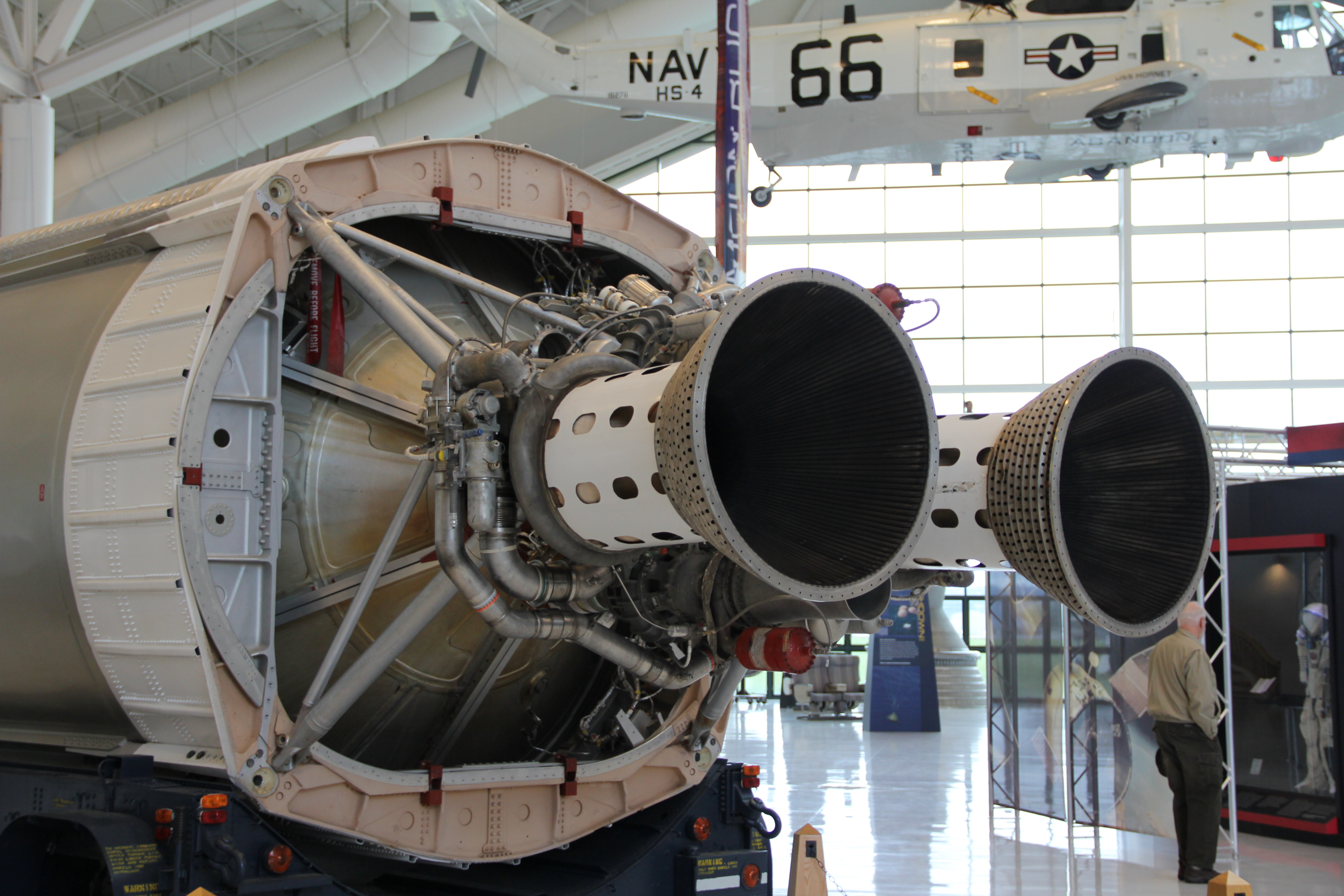
Titan IV-B at the Evergreen Aviation and Space Museum

== Launch history ==
Date / Time (UTC)	Launch site	S/N	Type	Payload	Outcome	Remarks
14 June 1989; 13:18	CCAFS LC-41	K-1	402A / IUS	USA-39 (DSP-14)	Success	An engine bell burn-through left only a narrow margin for success.
8 June 1990; 05:21	CCAFS LC-41	K-4	405A	USA-60 (NOSS); USA-61 (NOSS); USA-62 (NOSS); USA-59 Satellite Launch Dispenser Communications (SLDCOM)	Success	
13 November 1990; 00:37	CCAFS LC-41	K-6	402A / IUS	USA-65 (DSP-15)	Success	
8 March 1991; 12:03	VAFB LC-4E	K-5	403A	USA-69 (Lacrosse)	Success	
8 November 1991; 07:07	VAFB LC-4E	K-8	403A	USA-74 (NOSS); USA-76 (NOSS); USA-77 (NOSS); USA-72 SLDCOM	Success	
28 November 1992; 21:34	VAFB LC-4E	K-3	404A	USA-86 (KH-11)	Success	
2 August 1993; 19:59	VAFB LC-4E	K-11	403A	NOSS x3 SLDCOM	Failure	SRM exploded at T+101s due to damage caused during maintenance on ground.
7 February 1994; 21:47	CCAFS LC-40	K-10	401A / Centaur	USA-99 (Milstar-1)	Success	
3 May 1994; 15:55	CCAFS LC-41	K-7	401A / Centaur	USA-103 (Trumpet)	Success	
27 August 1994; 08:58	CCAFS LC-41	K-9	401A / Centaur	USA-105 (Mercury)	Success	
22 December 1994; 22:19	CCAFS LC-40	K-14	402A / IUS	USA-107 (DSP-17)	Success	
14 May 1995; 13:45	CCAFS LC-40	K-23	401A / Centaur	USA-110 (Orion)	Success	
10 July 1995; 12:38	CCAFS LC-41	K-19	401A / Centaur	USA-112 (Trumpet)	Success	
6 November 1995; 05:15	CCAFS LC-40	K-21	401A / Centaur	USA-115 (Milstar-2)	Success	
5 December 1995; 21:18	VAFB LC-4E	K-15	404A	USA-116 (KH-11)	Success	
24 April 1996; 23:37	CCAFS LC-41	K-16	401A / Centaur	USA-118 (Mercury)	Success	
12 May 1996; 21:32	VAFB LC-4E	K-22	403A	USA-120 (NOSS); USA-121 (NOSS); USA-122 (NOSS); USA-119 (SLDCOM); USA-123 Tethers in Space Physics Satellite (TiPS); USA-124 (TiPS)	Success	
3 July 1996; 00:30	CCAFS LC-40	K-2	405A	USA-125 (SDS)	Success	
20 December 1996; 18:04	VAFB LC-4E	K-13	404A	USA-129 (KH-11)	Success	NROL-2
23 February 1997; 20:20	CCAFS LC-40	B-24	402B / IUS	USA-130 (DSP-18)	Success	
15 October 1997; 08:43	CCAFS LC-40	B-33	401B / Centaur	Cassini; Huygens	Success	
24 October 1997; 02:32	VAFB LC-4E	A-18	403A	USA-133 (Lacrosse)	Success	NROL-3
8 November 1997; 02:05	CCAFS LC-41	A-17	401A / Centaur	USA-136 (Trumpet)	Success	NROL-4
9 May 1998; 01:38	CCAFS LC-40	B-25	401B / Centaur	USA-139 (Orion)	Success	NROL-6
12 August 1998; 11:30	CCAFS LC-41	A-20	401A / Centaur	NROL-7 (Mercury)	Failure	Guidance system short-circuited at T+40s due to frayed wire, vehicle lost control and destroyed by range safety.
9 April 1999; 17:01	CCAFS LC-41	B-27	402B / IUS	USA-142 (DSP-19)	Failure	Spacecraft failed to separate from IUS stage.
30 April 1999; 16:30	CCAFS LC-40	B-32	401B / Centaur	USA-143 (Milstar-3)	Failure	Centaur software database error caused loss of attitude control, insertion burns done incorrectly. Satellite deployed into useless orbit.
22 May 1999; 09:36	VAFB LC-4E	B-12	404B	USA-144 (Misty)	Success	NROL-8
8 May 2000; 16:01	CCAFS LC-40	B-29	402B / IUS	USA-149 (DSP-20)	Success	
17 August 2000; 23:45	VAFB LC-4E	B-28	403B	USA-152 (Lacrosse)	Success	NROL-11
27 February 2001; 21:20	CCAFS LC-40	B-41	401B / Centaur	USA-157 (Milstar-4)	Success	
6 August 2001; 07:28	CCAFS LC-40	B-31	402B / IUS	USA-159 (DSP-21)	Success	
5 October 2001; 21:21	VAFB LC-4E	B-34	404B	USA-161 (KH-11)	Success	NROL-14
16 January 2002; 00:30	CCAFS LC-40	B-38	401B / Centaur	USA-164 (Milstar-5)	Success	
8 April 2003; 13:43	CCAFS LC-40	B-35	401B / Centaur	USA-169 (Milstar-6)	Success	
9 September 2003; 04:29	CCAFS LC-40	B-36	401B / Centaur	USA-171 (Orion-5)	Success	NROL-19
14 February 2004; 18:50	CCAFS LC-40	B-39	402B / IUS	USA-176 (DSP-22)	Success	
30 April 2005; 00:50	CCAFS LC-40	B-30	405B	USA-182 (Lacrosse)	Success	NROL-16
19 October 2005; 18:05	VAFB LC-4E	B-26	404B	USA-186 (KH-11)	Success	NROL-20

== Launch failures ==
The Titan IV experienced four catastrophic launch failures.

=== 1993 booster explosion ===
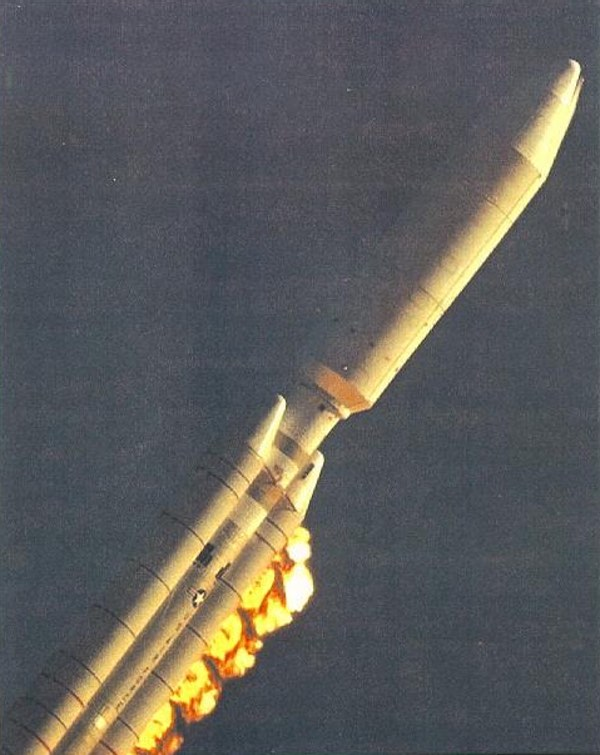
Titan IVA K-11 moments before the August 1993 failure

On August 2, 1993, Titan IV K-11 lifted from SLC-4E carrying a NOSS SIGNIT satellite. Unusually for DoD launches, the Air Force invited civilian press to cover the launch, which became more of a story than intended when the booster exploded 101 seconds after liftoff. Investigation found that one of the two SRMs had burned through, resulting in the destruction of the vehicle in a similar manner as the earlier 34D-9 failure. An investigation found that an improper repair job was the cause of the accident.

After Titan 34D-9, extensive measures had been put in place to ensure proper SRM operating condition, including X-raying the motor segments during prelaunch checks. The SRMs that went onto K-11 had originally been shipped to Cape Canaveral, where X-rays revealed anomalies in the solid propellant mixture in one segment. The defective area was removed by a pie-shaped cut in the propellant block. However, most of CSD's qualified personnel had left the program by this point and so the repair crew in question did not know the proper procedure. After replacement, they neglected to seal the area where the cut in the propellant block had been made. Post repair X-rays were enough for CC personnel to disqualify the SRMs from flight, but the SRMs were then shipped to Vandenberg and approved anyway. The result was a near-repeat of 34D-9; a gap was left between the propellant and SRM casing and another burn-through occurred during launch.

=== 1998 IV-A electrical failure ===
1998 saw the failure of Titan K-17 with a Navy ELINT Mercury (satellite) from Cape Canaveral around 40 seconds into the flight. K-17 was several years old and the last Titan IV-A to be launched. The post-accident investigation showed that the booster had dozens of damaged or chafed wires and should never have been launched in that operating condition, but the Air Force had put extreme pressure on launch crews to meet program deadlines. The Titan's fuselage was filled with numerous sharp metal protrusions that made it nearly impossible to install, adjust, or remove wiring without it getting damaged. Quality control at Lockheed's Denver plant, where Titan vehicles were assembled, was described as "awful".

The proximal cause of the failure was an electrical short that caused a momentary power dropout to the guidance computer at T+39 seconds. After power was restored, the computer sent a spurious pitch down and yaw to the right command. At T+40 seconds, the Titan was traveling at near supersonic speed and could not handle this action without suffering a structural failure. The sudden pitch downward and resulting aerodynamic stress caused one of the SRMs to separate. The ISDS (Inadvertent Separation Destruct System) automatically triggered, rupturing the SRM and taking the rest of the launch vehicle with it. At T+45 seconds, the Range Safety Officer sent the destruct command to ensure any remaining large pieces of the booster were broken up.

An extensive recovery effort was launched, both to diagnose the cause of the accident and recover debris from the classified satellite. All of the debris from the Titan had impacted offshore, between three and five miles downrange, and at least 30% of the booster was recovered from the sea floor. Debris continued to wash ashore for days afterward, and the salvage operation continued until October 15.

The Air Force had pushed for a "launch on demand" program for DOD payloads, something that was almost impossible to pull off especially given the lengthy preparation and processing time needed for a Titan IV launch (at least 60 days). Shortly before retiring in 1994, General Chuck Horner referred to the Titan program as "a nightmare". The 1998-99 schedule had called for four launches in less than 12 months. The first of these was Titan K-25 which successfully orbited an Orion SIGNIT satellite on May 9, 1998. The second was the K-17 failure, and the third was the K-32 failure.

=== Stage failure to separate ===
After a delay caused by the investigation of the previous failure, the 9 April 1999 launch of K-32 carried a DSP early warning satellite. The IUS second stage failed to separate, leaving the payload in a useless orbit. Investigation into this failure found that wiring harnesses in the IUS had been wrapped too tightly with electrical tape so that a plug failed to disconnect properly and prevented the two IUS stages from separating.

=== Centaur database error ===
The fourth failure was K-26 on April 30, 1999, carrying a Milstar communications satellite. During the Centaur coast phase flight, the roll control thrusters fired open-loop until the RCS fuel was depleted, causing the upper stage and payload to rotate rapidly. On restart, the Centaur cartwheeled out of control and left its payload in a useless orbit. This failure was found to be the result of an incorrectly entered database parameter in the guidance computer. The error caused the roll rate gyro data to be ignored by the flight computer.

== See also ==
- Comparison of heavy lift launch systems
- List of Titan launches, Titan I, II, III & IV
