= List of Delta IV Heavy launches =

Variant of the Delta IV space launch vehicle

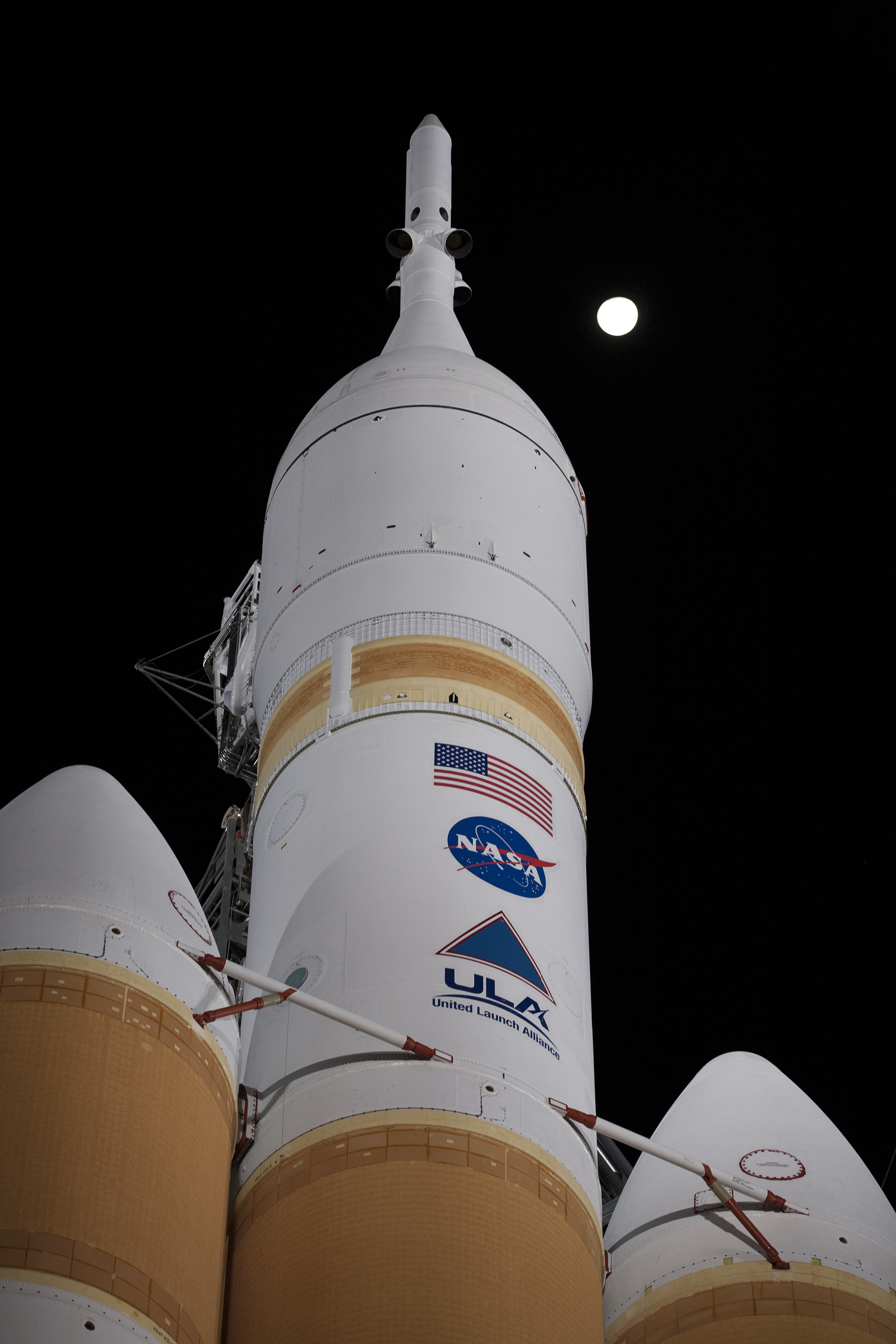
Delta IV Heavy for Exploration Flight Test-1

The Delta IV Heavy (Delta 9250H) was an expendable heavy-lift launch vehicle. When it was in service from 2004 to 2024, it was the largest type in the Delta IV family and was the world's second highest-capacity rocket in operation, behind SpaceX's Falcon Heavy rocket and closely followed by CNSA's Long March 5 rocket. It was manufactured by United Launch Alliance and was first launched in December 2004 and was retired after its last flight on April 9, 2024.

== Launch statistics ==
It had 11 launches from Florida, and 5 from Vandenberg, California.

- Partial Failure
- Success

== Launch history ==
Flight	Date	Payload	Mass	Launch site	Outcome
1	December 21, 2004	DemoSat, Sparkie / 3CS-1 and Ralphie / 3CS-2	≈6,000 kg (13,000 lb)	Cape Canaveral, SLC-37B	Partial failure (Note: Common Booster Cores underperformed, lower orbit than planned)
2	November 11, 2007	DSP-23	5,250 kg (11,570 lb)	Cape Canaveral, SLC-37B	Success
3	January 18, 2009	Orion 6 / Mentor 4 (USA-202 / NROL-26)	Classified	Cape Canaveral, SLC-37B	Success
4	November 21, 2010	Orion 7 / Mentor 5 (USA-223 / NROL-32)	Classified	Cape Canaveral, SLC-37B	Success
5	January 20, 2011	KH-11 Kennen 15 (USA-224 / NROL-49)	<17,000 kg (37,000 lb)	Vandenberg, SLC-6	Success
6	June 29, 2012	Orion 8 / Mentor 6 (USA-237 / NROL-15)	Classified	Cape Canaveral, SLC-37B	Success
7	August 26, 2013	KH-11 Kennen 16 (USA-245 / NROL-65)	<17,000 kg (37,000 lb)	Vandenberg, SLC-6	Success
8	December 5, 2014	Orion Exploration Flight Test-1 (EFT-1)	21,000 kg (46,000 lb) (Note: The officially reported mass of 21,000 kg includes the Launch Abort System (LAS) which did not reach orbit, but excludes the residual mass of the upper stage, which did reach orbit.)	Cape Canaveral, SLC-37B	Success
9	June 11, 2016	Orion 9 / Mentor 7 (USA-268 / NROL-37)	Classified	Cape Canaveral, SLC-37B	Success
10	August 12, 2018	Parker Solar Probe	685 kg (1,510 lb) (Note: plus Star 48BV upper stage (approx 2,100 kg))	Cape Canaveral, SLC-37B	Success
11	January 19, 2019	NROL-71	Classified	Vandenberg, SLC-6	Success
12	December 11, 2020	Orion 10 / Mentor 8 (USA-268/ NROL-44)	Classified	Cape Canaveral, SLC-37B	Success
13	April 26, 2021	KH-11 Kennen 17 (NROL-82)	Classified	Vandenberg, SLC-6	Success
14	September 24, 2022	KH-11 Kennen 18 (NROL-91)	Classified	Vandenberg, SLC-6	Success
15	June 22, 2023	Orion 11 / Mentor 9 (NROL-68)	Classified	Cape Canaveral, SLC-37B	Success
16	April 9, 2024	Orion 12 / Mentor 10 (NROL-70)	Classified	Cape Canaveral, SLC-37B	Success
