= Drag and Atmospheric Neutral Density Explorer =

DANDE
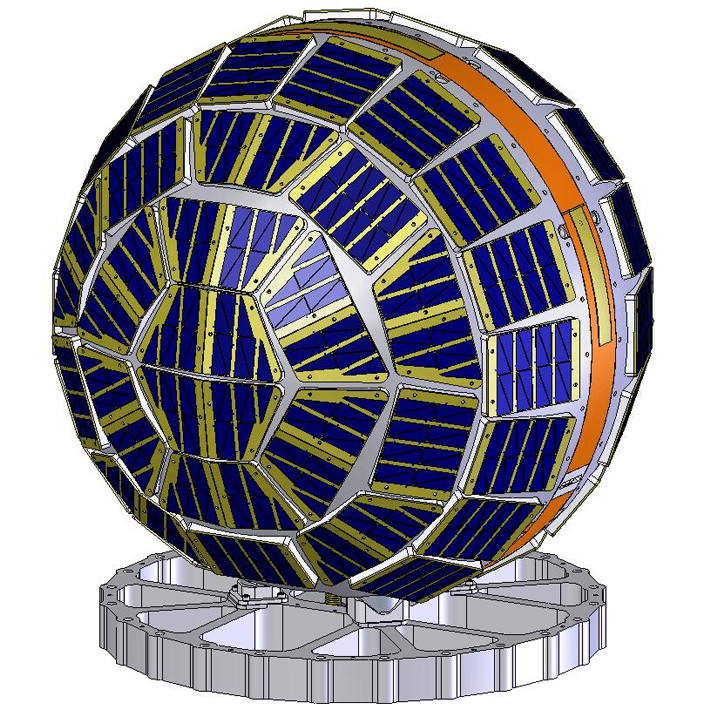
- The DANDE satellite in its launch configuration.
- Mission type: Technology
- Operator: University of Colorado Boulder; Colorado Space Grant Consortium; CU Dept of Aerospace Engineering Sciences; AFRL; STP
- COSPAR ID: 2013-055C
- SATCAT no.: 39267
- Website: spacegrant.colorado.edu/boulderstudents/boulderprojects/dande
- Mission duration: 1.5 years

Spacecraft properties
- Launch mass: 50 kilograms (110 lb)
- Dry mass: 38 kilograms (84 lb)

Start of mission
- Launch date: 29 September 2013, 16:00:13 UTC
- Rocket: Falcon 9 v1.1
- Launch site: Vandenberg SLC-4E
- Contractor: SpaceX

End of mission
- Last contact: c. 8 February 2014

Orbital parameters
- Reference system: Geocentric
- Regime: Low Earth
- Perigee altitude: 331 kilometres (206 mi)
- Apogee altitude: 1,426 kilometres (886 mi)
- Inclination: 80.99 degrees
- Period: 102.310 minutes
- Epoch: 24 January 2015, 03:43:37 UTC

Instruments
- Neutral Mass Spectrometer and Accelerometer
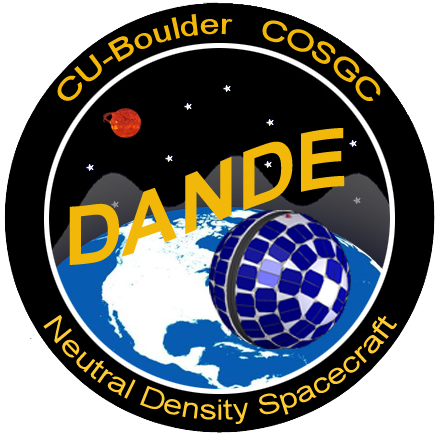

DANDE (or Drag and Atmospheric Neutral Density Explorer) is a 50 kg class spacecraft developed by the University of Colorado Boulder was the winner of the 5th iteration of the Air Force Research Laboratory's University Nanosat Program.

Due to a failure in a spacecraft system, the ground team was unable to actively command the satellite and spacecraft became just a passive object in Earth orbit by which some passive drag characteristics might be deduced.

== Status ==
DANDE launched on 29 September 2013 and correctly separated from the launch vehicle. After a month of assessing spacecraft health, successful separation of the Lightband Adaptor Bracket (LAB) was conducted on 30 October over the Starfire Optical Range in Maui. The next step was planned to be spin-up and alignment.

However, a failure in a spacecraft system prevented that. The DANDE team reported on 9 January 2014 that they had "been unable to actively command DANDE [but that they were] collecting passive drag data through analysis of the TLE's."

== Origin ==
DANDE was elected as an entry to the University Nanosat Program competition, a two-year program that is now in its seventh iteration. In 2009, DANDE won additional money and a future flight to orbit, propelling the project into an independent and master's research project. DANDE is the first CU student-built satellite launch opportunity in five years. To date, about 100 students have been involved in DANDE through construction, testing, and operations.

The density of the atmosphere varies greatly due to space weather and other unknown processes. The International Space Station once dropped in height by tens of kilometers in a span of a few days and by understanding drag forces and composition of the atmosphere we can provide better data about this phenomenon.

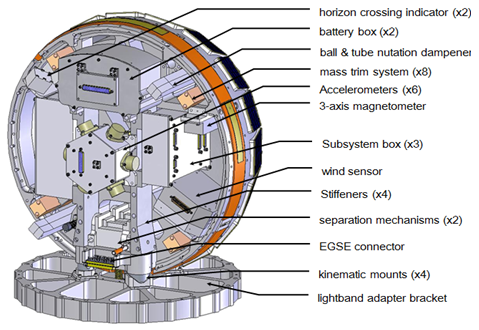
A basic internal view of the DANDE satellite.

== Science ==
Drag induced by the neutral-atmosphere density is the major perturbation on satellites in low Earth orbit. True density deviates as much as 21% from model predictions, introducing error into crucial government and private space operations with applications to situational awareness, space surveillance, laser communications, re-entry prediction, rendezvous and proximity ops. A need exists to measure physical or 'true' density, quantify density variations, and to provide in-situ model calibration data.

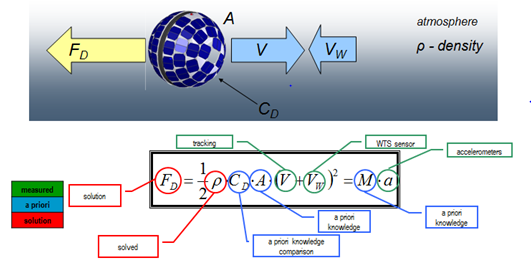
DANDE Drag Equation

The operating principle is to solve the full drag equation:

Each variable is isolated either by an a priori knowledge or via in-situ measurement. The mass (m) and area (A) are based on the physical parameters that can be measured prior to launch. The Coefficient of Drag is simulated using the external geometry of the spacecraft in its science collection state. Density (ρ), Acceleration (a), and a Wind Vector are sensed by two onboard instruments, the first is a high precision Accelerometer suite (ACC) that amplifies the μg drag signal in the along track axis of the spacecraft. Secondary to that is a Neutral Mass Spectrometer (NMS) that can provide data products relating the wind vector with respect to the spacecraft ram-vector as well as the numerical density of the constituents in the atmosphere. The idea is that at orbital velocities the spacecraft traveling through even a stagnant atmosphere will have collisions with the species present at energies of several Electron-Volts (eV) of which there are still billions per cubic meter.

DANDE is spherical in nature so the projected cross-sectional area is held nearly constant. This leverages a simplified attitude subsystem design as opposed to a full three-axis stabilized system. Further spinning about orbit normal allows the accelerometer instrument, located so the spin-axis is perpendicular to the acceleration sense axis, to accept in a modulated acceleration profile.

There were issues that make having GPS on board the spacecraft prohibitive. As a student program the cost of an unlock GPS receiver that could provide data products in orbital scenarios was a chief concern, but the spacecraft attitude state would not be conducive to consistently providing a lock at all times when geolocating data. High Task Tracking is a possibility through Air Force Space Command Research and Analysis group, but that agreement does not solve all the needs at the beginning of the mission when the desire is to make contact and begin commissioning.
