= Cornell University Satellite =

American technology demonstration satellite

- Names: CUSat
- Mission type: Technology demonstration
- Operator: Cornell University/AFRL
- COSPAR ID: 2013-055B
- SATCAT no.: 39266
- Website: At Cornell.edu

Spacecraft properties
- Manufacturer: Cornell Space Systems
- Launch mass: 40.82 kg (90.0 lb)

Start of mission
- Launch date: 16:00, September 29, 2013 (UTC)
- Rocket: Falcon 9 v1.1
- Launch site: Vandenberg Air Force Base

Orbital parameters
- Reference system: Geocentric
- Regime: Low Earth Orbit

The Cornell University Satellite (CUSat) is a nanosatellite developed by Cornell University that launched on 29 September 2013. It used a new algorithm called Carrier-phase Differential GPS (CDGPS) to calibrate global positioning systems to an accuracy of 3 millimeters. This technology can allow multiple spacecraft to travel in close proximity.

The CUSat project began in 2005 and was the winner of the University Nanosat-4 Program which aims to educate the future aerospace workforce and develop new space technologies. As part of this program, CUSat completed environmental testing and other aspects of final I&T in the AFRL Aerospace Engineering Facility at Kirtland Air Force Base. CUSat worked with AFRL to complete the Department of Defense SERB process in preparation for a launch with the Space Test Program. The satellite launched as a secondary payload to CASSIOPE on a SpaceX Falcon 9 rocket on 29 September 2013.

== Operation details ==
The space segment was originally designed to consist of two functionally identical satellites that would launch together and separate on orbit in a target-inspector configuration. Once in orbit, CUSat would use microthrust Pulsed Plasma Thrusters (PPTs) and sub-centimeter level accurate carrier-phase differential GPS (CDGPS) to navigate the satellites to within ten meters of each other. The inspector satellite would use cameras to gather imagery of the target satellite while performing relative navigation. Target satellite imagery would be transferred to the ground segment, where they would be used to reconstruct a three-dimensional model for the end user.

The mission was modified after one of the segments was damaged during testing. It later consisted of a single satellite with multiple antennas that transmit data to each other.

=== Original plan ===
==== Phase One: Launch ====
CUSat launched as a secondary payload on a launch vehicle. Once in orbit and in the correct attitude, CUSat separated from the launch vehicle where it began Phase Two - the initialization.

==== Phase Two: Initialization ====
Once CUSat separates from the launch vehicle and enters the Initialization Phase, it will enter solar illumination where the spacecraft will power on. The spacecraft will make contact with the Mission Control Center at Cornell through one of several ground stations, beaconing its status. Next, the spacecraft will begin to assess its tumble rates, and will detumble if required. Once stabilized, CUSat will begin commissioning operations. Operators in the MCC will assess the health of most satellite subsystems. During this time, the top spacecraft will begin to search for surrounding GPS satellites. A Carrier-phase Differential GPS Lock is then acquired to obtain an accurate attitude solution. The spacecraft will enter Phase Three: Spacecraft Separation.

==== Phase Three: Spacecraft Separation ====
Once an attitude control was obtained, CUSat's actuators adjusted the attitude for a proper separation.

While still in illumination, CUsat then performed a low-shock separation through the use of a lightband into Top and Bottom satellites. After separation, CUSat entered Phase Four: Inspection

==== Phase Four: Inspection ====
Once both Top and Bottom satellites obtained a GPS lock, the relative distance between the two was calculated via CDGPS. When the partner satellite entered an operational camera's field of view, the inspecting satellite acquired images of the partner satellite. The ground request specific images, which were subsequently downlinked from the space segment in the next communication opportunities.

On the ground, the downlinked data was used to construct a 3D image of CUSat to verify the CDGPS data.

== The team ==
At the time of its launch in 2013, it was estimated that 200 Cornell University students had participated in the project since it began in 2005.

=== Administration ===
The Principal Investigator for the CUSat project is Mason Peck. The two advisors for the CUSat project are Mark Campbell and Mark Psiaki.

=== Technical backgrounds ===
Because CUSat is an engineering project team at Cornell University, it is composed of a multitude of different students with a variety of abilities and talents. Team members come from such majors as Electrical and Computer Engineering, Mechanical and Aerospace Engineering, Applied and Engineering Physics, Computer Science, Economics and Management, and even Architecture.

== Subsystems ==
There has been a major redistribution of work, into different subsystems since FCR. The current subsystems are listed below.

- ADCNS: The Attitude Determination, Control, and Navigation Subsystem (ADCNS) executes the relative navigation that were to be used for CUSat's in-orbit inspection procedures. CUSat primarily used three GPS boards for attitude determination. For attitude control, CUSat used pulsed-plasma thrusters (PPTs) and reaction wheels. The software portion of ADCNS consisted of the relative navigation algorithms, which ran the various modes of operation defined by the CONOPs.
- Camera: The camera team was responsible for acquiring images while in orbit, compressing them in a modified JPEG format, and relaying them to the onboard computer, C&DH.
- Command and Data Handling: C&DH was the central hub for communication and computation on the satellite. Using a commercial off the shelf (COTS) single board computer running Windows CE and C++, C&DH executed the ADCNS algorithms and flight code.
- GPS: The GPS team was responsible for the GPS receivers, antennas and algorithms used to calculate sub-centimeter relative positioning.
- Ground Segment: The ground segment was responsible for the ground operations of the satellite, including ground to satellite communication, tracking and commanding.
- Harness: The Harness subsystem was responsible for satellite wiring, the electronics backplane, the electrical interface boards, and any System level electrical concerns.
- Industry Relations: The Industry Relations team was responsible for marketing CUSat and seeking commercial and academic sponsorship.
- Integration and Testing: The I&T team was responsible for enabling rapid integration and testing of CUSat. I&T was also responsible for testing CUSat in Cornell University's thermal vacuum chamber.
- Mechanical Hardware: The Mechanical Hardware team manufactured the satellite structure and managed the design. The structure included eight isogrid panels as well as numerous electronics board enclosures.
- Mission Ops: The Mission Ops team defined the detailed, on orbit operations plan for both CUSat satellites. Operating procedures were defined to match with hardware and mission specifications and help ensure successful execution of the mission.
- Power: The power team was responsible for harnessing solar energy, storing it, and distributing it throughout the satellite.
- Propulsion: The propulsion team was responsible for CUSat's pulsed plasma thrusters (PPTs) which gave each satellite six degrees of freedom: three degrees of translational freedom and three degrees of rotational freedom.
- Structures: The structures team was responsible for designing, analyzing, and manufacturing the body of the satellite as well as the logistics of the internal components.
- Survivability: The Survivability team was responsible for analyzing and controlling the satellite's thermal, electrical and vibrational environment on the ground, during launch, and in orbit. Analyzed effects include ESD, atomic oxygen effects, venting and outgassing.
- Systems: The CUSat Satellite project employed systems engineering extensively. The Systems group was largely responsible for providing the project with direction by creating top level system requirements, creating best practices, maintaining communications, making design choices, and creating processes for creating a successful product. Each of the subsystem leads also participated as a member of the Systems group, which allowed the project to maintain consistency and focus.
- Telemetry and Command: T&C was responsible for intersatellite communications as well as satellite to ground communications. T&C used modified commercial radios operating in amateur frequency bands to transmit images acquired by the satellites to the ground station. The satellite was assigned the FCC call sign WG2XTI for amateur radio satellite service.
