= CASSIOPE =

Canadian Space Agency multi-mission satellite

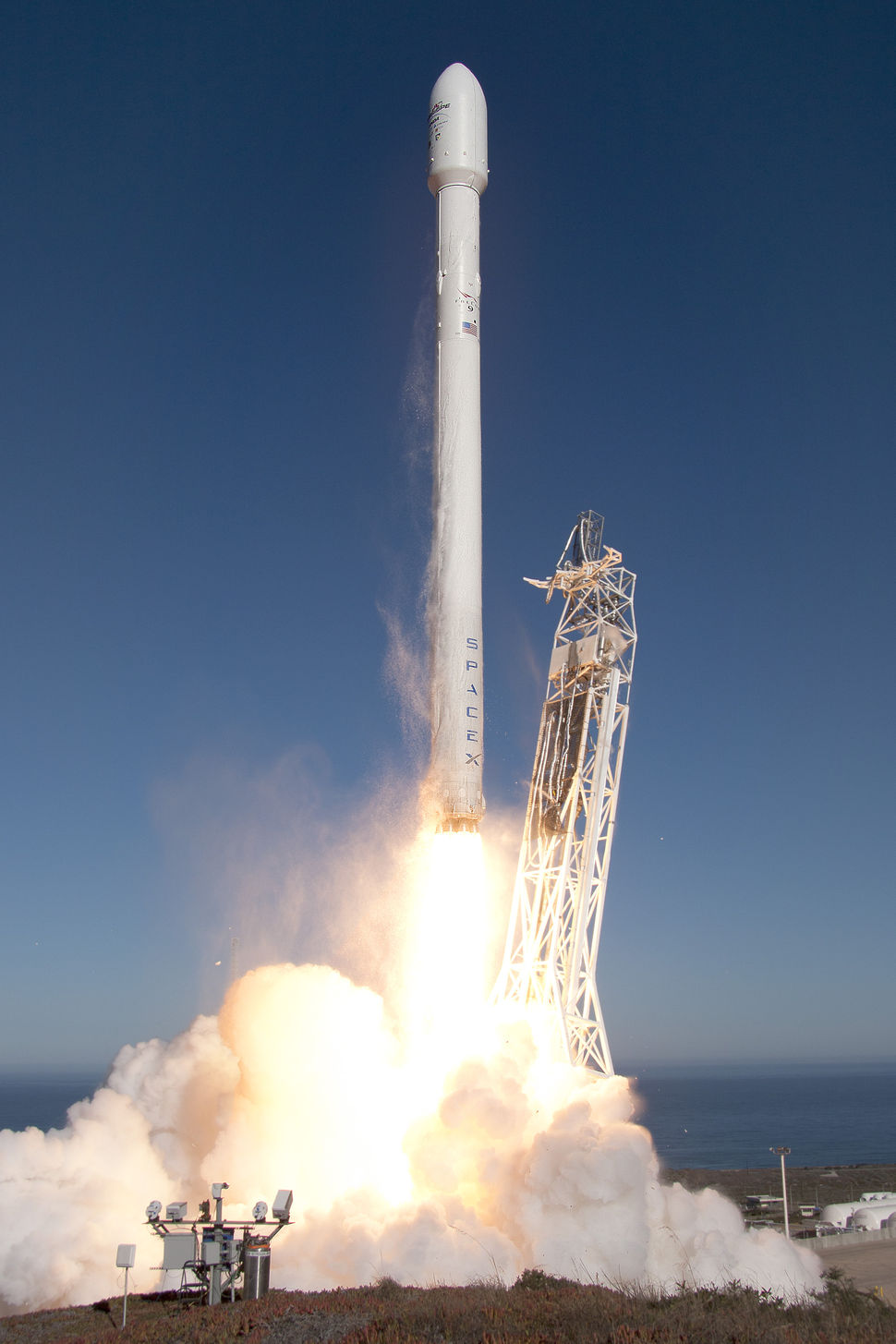
- CASSIOPE launches on a Falcon 9 v1.1
- Mission type: Technology; Communications; Research
- Operator: University of Calgary
- COSPAR ID: 2013-055A
- SATCAT no.: 39265
- Website: http://www.asc-csa.gc.ca/eng/satellites/cassiope.asp
- Mission duration: Primary mission: 18 months Design life: 2 years Elapsed: 12 years, 6 months, 30 days
- Orbits completed: 53807

Spacecraft properties
- Bus: MAC-200
- Manufacturer: MDA (prime); Magellan Aerospace (subcontractor); Com Dev (subcontractor)
- Launch mass: 481 kg (1,060 lb)
- Dimensions: 180×125 cm (71×49 in)
- Power: 5 solar panels generating up to 600 W

Start of mission
- Launch date: September 29, 2013, 16:00 UTC
- Rocket: Falcon 9 v1.1
- Launch site: Vandenberg SLC-4E
- Contractor: SpaceX

Orbital parameters
- Reference system: Geocentric
- Regime: Low Earth
- Semi-major axis: 7,063 km (4,389 mi)
- Eccentricity: 0.0526838
- Perigee altitude: 320 km (200 mi)
- Apogee altitude: 1,064.2 km (661.3 mi)
- Inclination: 80.9604 degrees
- Period: 98.46 minutes
- RAAN: 349.3323 degrees
- Argument of perigee: 335.9358 degrees
- Mean anomaly: 21.8 degrees
- Mean motion: 14.6254
- Epoch: January 30, 2024, 12:46:11 UTC

Cascade, Smallsat and Ionospheric Polar Explorer (CASSIOPE), is a Canadian Space Agency (CSA) multi-mission satellite operated by the University of Calgary. The mission development and operations from launch to February 2018 was funded through CSA and the Technology Partnerships Canada program. In February 2018 CASSIOPE became part of the European Space Agency's Swarm constellation through the Third-Party Mission Program, known as Swarm Echo, or Swarm-E. It was launched September 29, 2013, on the first flight of the SpaceX Falcon 9 v1.1 launch vehicle. CASSIOPE is the first Canadian hybrid satellite to carry a dual mission in the fields of telecommunications and scientific research. The main objectives are to gather information to better understand the science of space weather, while verifying high-speed communications concepts through the use of advanced space technologies.

The satellite was deployed in an elliptical polar orbit and carries a commercial communications system called Cascade as well as a scientific experiment package called e-POP (enhanced Polar Outflow Probe) Following staging, the Falcon 9's first stage was used by SpaceX for a controlled descent and landing test. While the first stage was destroyed on impact with the ocean, significant data was acquired and the test was considered a success.

== History ==
The satellite that became CASSIOPE began with a 1996 concept for a small (70 kg/150 lb), inexpensive microsatellite called Polar Outflow Probe, or POP. The Canadian Space Agency funded a 1997 feasibility study that led to a modified mission concept that was designed during 2000-2005. The revised concept was to combine an enhanced version of POP, called e-POP, with a MacDonald, Dettwiler and Associates (MDA) commercial satellite called Cascade, into a single satellite, and to design and build a generic, low-cost small satellite bus that would be useful for other Canadian satellite missions in the future. The eight e-POP scientific instruments were built, calibrated, and tested in 2005-2007, with integration onto the satellite bus for spacecraft-level testing in 2008-2009.

== Spacecraft ==
CASSIOPE is a 481 kg (1,060 lb) small satellite that is 180 cm (71 in) long and 125 cm (49 in) high. It combines the function of two distinct missions in order to be more cost-effective and reduce risk. The spacecraft carries a primary payload of two instrument suites: the Cascade commercial communications system and a scientific payload named e-POP.

=== Cascade ===
The commercial payload, named Cascade, is a technology demonstrator courier in the sky, aimed at providing a proof of concept for a digital broadband courier service for commercial use. Built by MDA, the operational concept is to receive very large data files as the satellite orbits the globe, store them onboard temporarily, then deliver them at a later time to nearly any destination worldwide.

=== e-POP ===
The e-POP portion of CASSIOPE is a suite of eight scientific instruments. The University of Calgary's Institute for Space Research leads the science project, while MDA is the prime contractor for the mission including launch and operation of the spacecraft. The orbital science mission is scheduled for a 21-month duration. e-POP will gather data on Solar storms in the upper atmosphere. These storms give rise to the polar aurora or northern lights seen in the skies in northern latitudes. While these atmospheric glows may offer a thrilling nighttime spectacle, the inducing radiation can interfere with radio communications, GPS navigation, and other space-based systems. The eight scientific instruments aboard CASSIOPE will help scientists understand solar weather and eventually plan for measures to mitigate its deleterious effects.

The e-POP payload contains eight scientific instruments:

- Coherent EM Radio Tomography (CER), measuring radio propagation and ionospheric scintillation
- Fast Auroral Imager (FAI), measuring large-scale auroral emissions
- GPS Altitude and Profiling Experiment (GAP), high-precision position and attitude determination
- Imaging and Rapid Scanning Ion Mass Spectrometer (IRM), measuring the three-dimensional distribution of ions
- Fluxgate Magnetometer (MGF), high-precision magnetic field perturbation measurement
- Neutral Mass Spectrometer (NMS), measuring the mass, composition and velocity of neutral particles
- Radio Receiver Instrument (RRI), measuring radio wave propagation
- Suprathermal Electron Imager (SEI), measuring low-energy electron distribution

== Launch ==
SpaceX Falcon 9 launch from Vandenberg with CASSIOPE

In 2006, when SpaceX Falcon 9 launch services were contracted, the vehicle had not yet been developed. Despite this, MDA agreed to place CASSIOPE on one of its inaugural flights. Originally scheduled for the second quarter of 2008, the launch date was repeatedly postponed. In June 2010, the launch vehicle shifted from the Falcon 9 v1.0 to the Falcon 9 v1.1.

MDA consented to place CASSIOPE on the inaugural flight of an essentially unproven launch vehicle. The Falcon 9 v1.1, an upgraded version of the original Falcon 9, was significantly larger and heavier, with a 60 percent increase in thrust. However, the payload mass, approximately 500 kg (1,100 lb), was relatively light compared to the rocket’s capabilities. As a technology demonstration mission for SpaceX, MDA received a discounted rate, approximately 20 percent below the normal published price for a SpaceX Falcon 9 low Earth orbit (LEO) mission.

Given that this was the inaugural flight of a new launch vehicle, the US Air Force estimated the overall probability of failure on the mission to be nearly 50 percent. Fortunately, the mission was successful, as was each of the subsequent 13 Falcon 9 v1.1 missions. However, a launch vehicle failure and loss of mission occurred on the SpaceX CRS-7 International Space Station resupply mission in June 2015.

CASSIOPE was launched on September 29, 2013, marking SpaceX’s inaugural launch of a Falcon 9 from Vandenberg Air Force Base in California. It also represented SpaceX’s first Falcon 9 launch into a polar orbit and the first time a Falcon 9 launched with a payload fairing instead of a Dragon spacecraft atop. The Falcon 9 upper stage, used to launch CASSIOPE, was left in a decaying elliptical low Earth orbit. It entered the atmosphere on February 8, 2025, with its final perigee of 135 km (84 mi) and an apogee of 161 km (100 mi).

=== Post-mission launch vehicle testing ===
After the second stage separated from the booster stage, SpaceX tested the booster in an attempt to re-enter the lower atmosphere in a controlled manner and decelerate to a simulated over-water landing. Three minutes into the launch, the booster stage attitude was reversed, and three of the nine engines refired at high altitude, as planned, to initiate the deceleration and controlled descent trajectory to the surface of the ocean. The first phase of the test worked well and the first stage re-entered safely. However, the first stage began to roll due to aerodynamic forces during the descent through the atmosphere, and the roll rate exceeded the capabilities of the booster attitude control system (ACS) to null it out. The fuel in the tanks centrifuged to the outside of the tank and the single engine involved in the low-altitude deceleration maneuver shut down. Debris from the first stage was subsequently retrieved from the ocean.

SpaceX also ran a post-mission test on the second stage. While a number of the new capabilities were successfully tested on the CASSIOPE flight, there was an issue with the second stage restart test. The test to reignite the second stage Merlin 1D vacuum engine once the rocket had deployed its primary payload (CASSIOPE) and all of its nanosat secondary payloads was unsuccessful. The engine failed to restart while the second stage was coasting in low-Earth orbit.

=== Secondary payloads ===
Five nanosatellite spacecraft that were also carried to orbit on the same launch vehicle that carried the CASSIOPE primary payload:

- CUSat, Cornell University
- Drag and Atmospheric Neutral Density Explorer (DANDE), University of Colorado Boulder
- three Polar Orbiting Passive Atmospheric Calibration Spheres (POPACS), each a 10 cm (4 in) white aluminum sphere, joint project of Morehead State University, University of Arkansas, Montana State University, Drexel University, and Planetary Systems Corporation.

== Operations ==
After a successful launch on September 29, 2013, CASSIOPE entered into a commissioning phase that lasted to January 1, 2014, with no faults detected on the spacecraft bus or payloads. Three ground stations were utilized, including Kiruna (Sweden), Inuvik (Canada), and the German Antarctic Receiving Station at the General Bernardo O'Higgins Base in Antarctica. Routine operations were scheduled to run to March, 2015. The mission was extended via funding from the Technology Partnerships Canada program through the Industrial Technologies Office that was part of the Canadian government at the time. In February 2018, the European Space Agency, through the Third Party Mission Program, integrated the mission into the Swarm constellation of satellites. They renamed CASSIOPE as "Swarm-Echo", recognizing the synergy between the two missions in collecting space weather data in low-Earth orbit. The partnership allowed for four ground station contacts per day, rather than one, greatly increasing the amount of data that could be downloaded from the e-POP suite of instruments.

On August 11, 2016, one of the four reaction wheels used for spacecraft attitude control failed. This did not affect spacecraft operations in a significant way since only three wheels are required for 3-axis stabilized pointing. A second reaction wheel failed on February 27, 2021, forcing the spacecraft into a slowly spinning, safe-hold attitude configuration. Three-axis stabilized control was restored in September 2021 by implementing a bias momentum configuration on the two remaining wheels (spinning the wheels in opposite directions), and using the magnetic torque rods for attitude control. Three months later, on December 17, 2021, a third reaction wheel failed, leaving the spacecraft with no viable methods for fixed attitude pointing. Although most of the e-POP instruments were fully operational, without stabilized pointing much of the science objectives could not be met, resulting in a conclusion of the operational portion of the mission on December 31, 2021.

== See also ==
- List of Falcon 9 and Falcon Heavy launches
