= University Nanosatellite Program =

Design and fabrication competition

The University Nanosat Program is a satellite design and fabrication competition for universities. It is jointly administered by the Air Force Office of Scientific Research (AFOSR), the Air Force Research Laboratory (AFRL), the American Institute of Aeronautics and Astronautics (AIAA), the Space Development and Test Wing and the AFRL Space Vehicles Directorate's Spacecraft Technology division. NASA's Goddard Space Flight Center was involved from the program inception through Nanosat-3.

The UNP is a recurring competition that involves two phases. The first phase (Phase A) occurs as university teams initially respond to a solicitation posted by the UNP program or one of its partner organizations. The solicitation results in a competition for selection for that program cycle. Typically 10-11 awards are made during this initial phase. Grants are offered to the awardees to participate in a rigorous two-year process to design and develop their satellite concept. At the end of the two years, a Flight Competition Review is held where judges evaluate each program's progress and readiness to move to the next phase. Winners from each cycle are offered launch by AFRL when the systems are ready for flight. Other U.S. Government agencies, such as NASA through the Educational Launch of Nanosatellites (ELaNa) initiative, also step in to offer launch opportunities when available. Since 1999, there have been 11 cycles of the program.

The program's objective is to train tomorrow's space professionals by providing a rigorous two year concept to flight-ready spacecraft competition for U. S. higher education institutions and to enable small satellite research and development (R&D), integration and flight test. Approximately 5,000 college students and 40 institutions of higher learning have been involved in this experience since its inception in 1999.

== Program Cycles ==
=== Nanosat-1/Nanosat-2 ===
- 1st-group. Arizona State University: Sparkie (3CornerSat)
- 1st-group. New Mexico State University: Petey (3CornerSat)
- 1st-group. University of Colorado at Boulder: Ralphie (3CornerSat)
- Boston University: Constellation Pathfinder
- Carnegie Mellon University: Solar Blade Nanosat
- Santa Clara University: Emerald and Orion
- Stanford University: Emerald and Orion
- Utah State University: USUSat
- Virginia Polytechnic Institute and State University: HokieSat
- University of Washington: DAWGSTAR

Events and Milestones:

- December 2004. Sparkie and Ralphie launch on the inaugural Delta-IV Heavy

=== Nanosat-3 ===
The Nanosat-3 cycle started in 2003 when 13 universities were chosen to compete. The panel selected the University of Texas at Austin’s Formation Autonomous Spacecraft with Thruster, Relative-Navigation, Attitude and Crosslink or FASTRAC satellite(s) as the winner.

- 1st. The University of Texas at Austin: FASTRAC
- 2nd. Taylor University: TEST
- 3rd. Michigan Technological University: HuskySat
- Arizona State University
- University of Colorado at Boulder: DINO
- University of Hawaii at Manoa: Twin Stars
- University of Michigan: FENIX
- Montana State University: MAIA
- New Mexico State University: NMSUSat
- Penn State University: LionSat
- Utah State University: USUSat II
- Washington University in St. Louis: Akoya and Bandit
- Worcester Polytechnic Institute: PANSAT

Events and Milestones:

- November 19, 2010. University of Texas FASTRAC spacecraft launches on a Minotaur IV

=== Nanosat-4 ===
In March 2005, eleven universities were chosen from the submitted proposals to compete in the Nanosat-4 Phase B effort. CUSat was selected the winner of the cycle in March 2007.

- 1st. Cornell University: CUSat
- 2nd. Washington University in St. Louis: Akoya and Bandit
- 3rd. University of Missouri-Rolla: UMR SAT
- University of Central Florida: KNIGHTSAT
- University of Cincinnati: BEARSat
- University of Minnesota: MinneSAT
- New Mexico State University: NMSUSat 2
- Santa Clara University: ONYX
- Texas A&M University: AggieSat1
- University of Texas at Austin: ARTEMIS
- Utah State University: TOROID

Events and Milestones:

- March 2007. Nanosat-4 Flight Competition Review where CUSat named winner
- September 29, 2013. Cornell University's CUSat launched successfully.

=== Nanosat-5 ===
The Nanosat-5 competition began in January 2007 with 11 universities being selected from 26 proposal submissions. The University of Colorado at Boulder’s Drag and Atmospheric Neutral Density Experiment or DANDE was selected to continue on toward launch.

- 1st. University of Colorado at Boulder: DANDE
- 2nd. Washington University in St. Louis: Akoya-B & Bandit-C
- 3rd. Michigan Technological University: Oculus
- Boston University: BUSat
- University of Minnesota: Goldeneye
- Montana State University: SpaceBuoy
- Penn State University: NittanySat
- Santa Clara University: Obsidian
- Texas A&M University: AggieSat3
- The University of Texas at Austin: 2-STEP
- Utah State University: TOROID II

Events and Milestones:

- January 2009. Nanosat-5 Flight Competition Review where DANDE named winner
- September 29, 2013. DANDE launches on Falcon-9

=== Nanosat-6 ===
The Nanosat-6 Program Flight Competition Review was sponsored by the American Institute of Aeronautics and Astronautics was held in Albuquerque, New Mexico. A panel of judges from the Air Force Research Laboratory, Space Test Program, Air Force Institute of Technology and industry selected the winners identified in the table below.

- 1st. Michigan Technological University: Oculus-ASR
- 2nd. Cornell University: Violet
- 3rd. University of Hawaii at Manoa: Ho'oponopono
- University of Central Florida: KnightSat 2
- Georgia Institute of Technology: R^{3}
- Massachusetts Institute of Technology: CASTOR
- University of Minnesota: TwinSat
- Missouri S&T: MR & MRS SAT
- Montana State University: SpaceBuoy
- Saint Louis University: COPPER
- Santa Clara University: IRIS

Events and Milestones:

- January 2009. Kickoff
- January 2011. Flight Competition Review
- June 25, 2019. Michigan Tech's Oculus-ASR satellite launches on Falcon-9 Heavy

=== Nanosat-7 ===
Eleven schools were selected to pursue the Nanosat-7 opportunity:

- 1st- Microsats. Georgia Institute of Technology: Prox-1
- 2nd- Microsats. Missouri S&T
- 1st- Cubesats. University of Texas at Austin
- 2nd- Cubesats. University of Michigan
- Boston University: BUSat
- SUNY Buffalo
- University of Hawaii at Manoa
- University of Maryland
- Massachusetts Institute of Technology
- Montana State University
- St. Louis University: Argus

=== Nanosat-8 ===
The Nanosat-8 cycle started in late 2012 with the selection of 10 competing schools. AFRL announced the winners of the Nanosat-8 cycle in February 2015. The first four winners included Missouri University of Science and Technology, the University of Colorado at Boulder, Georgia Institute of Technology, and Taylor University respectively. With a tie for fifth spot, Boston University and State University of New York at Buffalo teams will support deep-dive visits from judges to each program for a tie-breaker decision.

- 1st. Missouri S&T: MR & MRS SAT
- 2nd. University of Colorado Boulder: PolarCube
- 3rd. Georgia Institute of Technology: RECONSO
- 4th. Taylor University: ELEO-Sat
- 5th (t). Boston University: ANDESITE
- 5th (t). SUNY Buffalo: GLADOS
- University of California, Los Angeles: ELFIN
- Embry-Riddle Aeronautical University: ARAPAIMA
- University of Florida: CHOMPTT
- New Mexico State University: INCA

=== Nanosat-9 ===
The Nanosat-9 Flight Selection Review process resulted in selection of the University of Georgia MOCI payload as winner with the University of Colorado at Boulder's MAXWELL coming in second.

- 1st. University of Georgia: MOCI
- 2nd. University of Colorado Boulder: MAXWELL
- University of Arizona
- SUNY Buffalo
- Massachusetts Institute of Technology
- Michigan Technological University
- University of Minnesota
- Missouri S&T: APEX
- United States Naval Academy
- Western Michigan University

=== Nanosat-10 ===
In November 2021, three universities were notified of selection for flight when each program's satellite is ready for launch.

- 1st. University of Minnesota: EXACT
- 2nd. Texas A&M University: Aggiesat6
- 3rd. Michigan Technological University: Auris
- St. Louis University: DORRE

=== Nanosat-11 ===
The Nanosat-11 competition was announced in August 2021. Participants were notified by AFRL of onward inclusion in the Nanosat-11 effort on November 23, 2021

- University of Alaska Fairbanks: CCP
- Auburn University: QUEST
- SUNY Buffalo: POLAR
- University of Colorado Boulder: RALPHIE
- University of Maryland: THEIA
- Purdue University: FLaC-Sat
- Rutgers University: SPICEsat
- Saint Louis University: DORRE
- University of Texas at Austin: SERPENT
- Western Michigan University: PEP-GS

== See also ==
- United States Air Force Research Laboratory#Space Vehicles Directorate - AFRL - SV
- NASA Educational Launch of Nanosatellites (ELaNa)
