= Petey (satellite) =

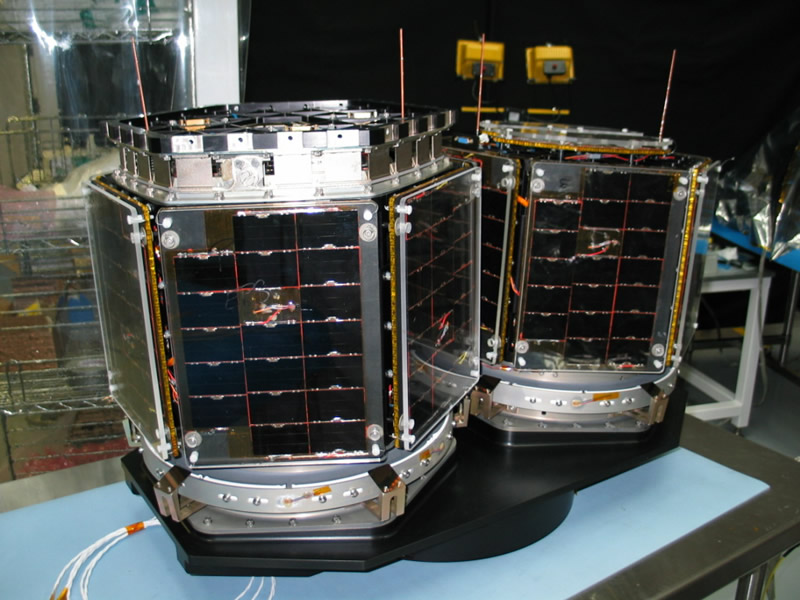
- A picture of 2 of 3CS satellites
- Mission type: Technology
- Operator: NMSU, AFRL, STP

Spacecraft properties
- Launch mass: 16 kilograms (35 lb)
- Dimensions: 46 x 30cm (six-sided)

Start of mission
- Launch date: Not launched
- Rocket: Delta IV Heavy
- Launch site: Cape Canaveral SLC-37B

Orbital parameters
- Reference system: Geocentric
- Regime: Low Earth
- Epoch: Planned

Petey (or 3CS-3) was a satellite, part of Three Corner Satellite (3CS) project, a three satellite (Sparkie, Ralphie and Petey) student research project. It was designed and built by mostly undergraduate students at the New Mexico State University as part of the Air Force Research Laboratory's University Nanosat Program. It was responsible for communication system in 3CS project.

Satellite was not completed in time for launch of 3CS on December 21, 2004, and later was donated to the National Air and Space Museum’s Steven F. Udvar-Hazy Center. The two other 3CS satellites Sparkie and Ralphie were launched 21 December 2004 on the first launch of Delta IV Heavy. The launch was a partial failure, and in particular the two 3CS satellites did not achieve orbit.

Satellite carries the name of New Mexico State University's mascot, Pistol Pete.

== See also ==
- Ralphie (satellite)
- Sparkie (satellite)
