= Sparkie (satellite) =

American satellite, 2004 launch failed

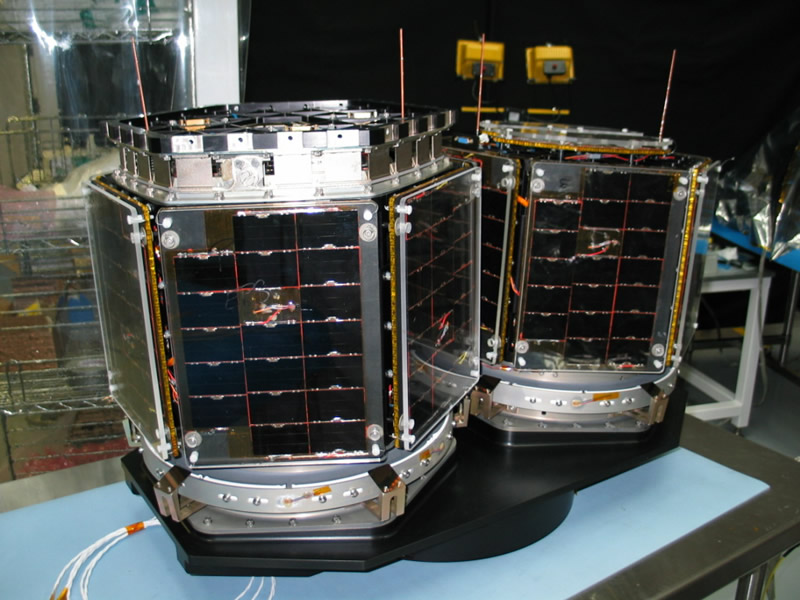
- Mission type: Technology
- Operator: ASU; AFRL; STP
- Mission duration: Failed to orbit

Spacecraft properties
- Launch mass: 16 kilograms (35 lb)
- Dimensions: 46 x 30cm (six-sided)

Start of mission
- Launch date: December 21, 2004
- Rocket: Delta IV Heavy
- Launch site: Cape Canaveral SLC-37B

Orbital parameters
- Reference system: Geocentric
- Regime: Low Earth
- Epoch: Planned

Sparkie (or 3CS-1) was a satellite, part of the Three Corner Satellite (3CS) project, a three satellite (Sparkie, Ralphie and Petey) student research project. It was designed and built by mostly undergraduate students at the Arizona State University as part of the Air Force Research Laboratory's University Nanosat Program.

Sparky was responsible for structure, power and the attitude system in the 3CS project.

Satellite carries the name of Arizona State University's mascot, Sparky.

Sparky was launched on the first launch of the Delta IV Heavy rocket configuration, along with the Ralphie satellite, but both satellites failed to achieve orbit due to a problem with the rocket during launch.

== See also ==
- Petey (satellite)
- Ralphie (satellite)
