= Ralphie (satellite) =

Satellite

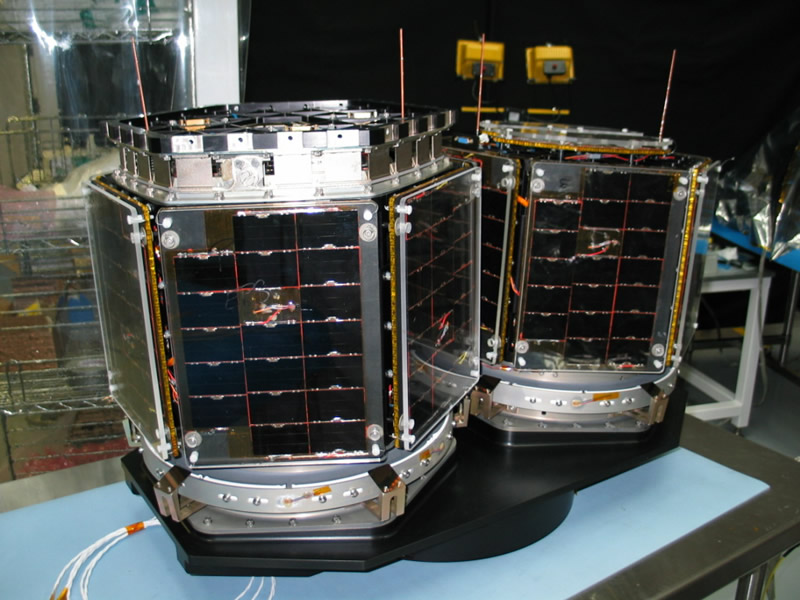
- Mission type: Technology
- Operator: CU-Boulder; AFRL; STP
- Mission duration: Failed to orbit

Spacecraft properties
- Launch mass: 16 kilograms (35 lb)
- Dimensions: 46 x 30cm (six-sided)

Start of mission
- Launch date: December 21, 2004
- Rocket: Delta IV Heavy
- Launch site: Cape Canaveral SLC-37B

Orbital parameters
- Reference system: Geocentric
- Regime: Low Earth
- Epoch: Planned

Ralphie (or 3CS-2) was a satellite, part of the Three Corner Satellite (3CS) project, a three satellite (Sparkie, Ralphie, Petey) student research project. It was designed and built by mostly undergraduate students at the University of Colorado Boulder as part of the Air Force Research Laboratory's University Nanosat Program.

Ralphie was responsible for imaging and End-to-End Data Systems in the 3CS project.

The satellite carries the name of CU Boulder's mascot, Ralphie.

Ralphie was launched on the first launch of the Delta IV Heavy rocket configuration, along with 3CS-1, "Sparkie", but failed to achieve orbit due to a problem with the rocket during launch.

== See also ==
- Petey (satellite)
- Sparkie (satellite)
