= 3 Corner Satellite =

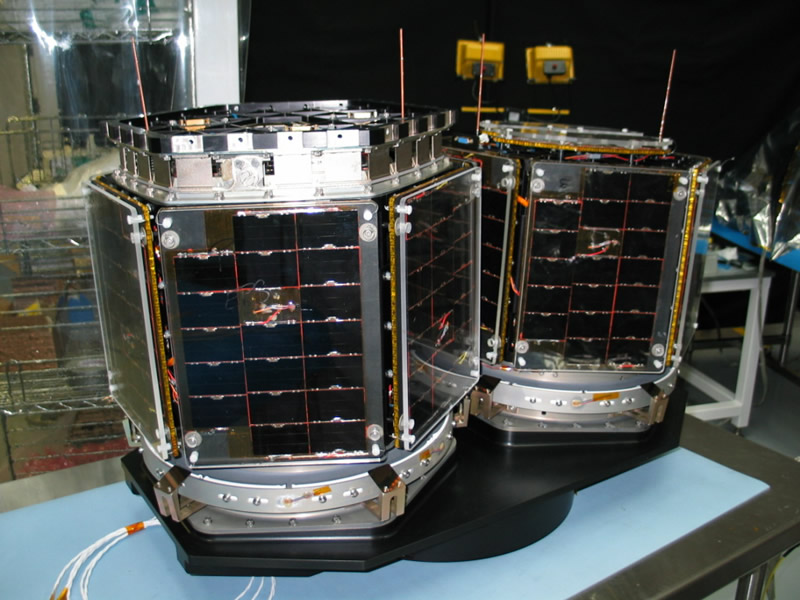
- Two 3CS satellites undergoing testing
- Country of origin: United States
- Operator: CU-Boulder, ASU, NMSU, AFRL, STP
- Applications: Technology demonstration

Specifications
- Regime: Low Earth (planned)
- Design life: 2-4 months

Production
- Status: Failed
- Built: 3
- Launched: 2
- Lost: 2
- Maiden launch: Ralphie/Sparkie; December 21, 2004; Failed to orbit

Three Corner Satellite (or 3CS, or 3CornerSat) consisted of three student-built microsatellites flying in formation. Primary mission objectives were to demonstrate formation flying, provide stereoscopic imaging of cloud formations, and demonstrate distributed and autonomous operations.

A pair of spacecraft, Ralphie and Sparkie, was developed by the University of Colorado at Boulder and Arizona State University as part of the Air Force Research Laboratory's University Nanosat Program. A third satellite, Petey, developed by New Mexico State University was originally also part of the 3CS.

The 3CS stack was originally slated for launch aboard the Space Shuttle in 2003, but after the Shuttle Columbia tragedy, mission organizers switched to the first launch of the Boeing Delta IV Heavy rocket. Due to a problem with the rocket during launch, the 3CS satellites on board, Sparkie and Ralphie, failed to achieve orbit. The satellites were to have been dropped off at a low 180 km × 240 km, but they entered orbit at a height of only 105 km, which led to a rapid decay.

The third 3CS satellite Petey was not aboard the 3CS launch on Delta IV Heavy (due to the fitting only being able to hold two spacecraft; Petey was used for ground software and communications testing ) and was later donated to the National Air and Space Museum’s Steven F. Udvar-Hazy Center.

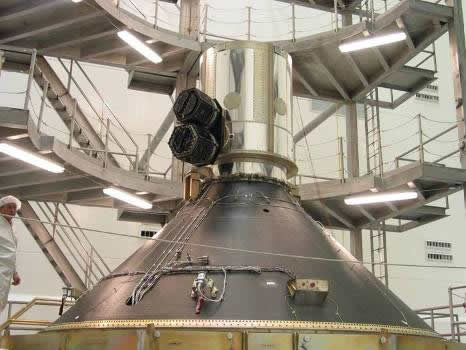
3CS placed atop the launch vehicle

== Project Mission ==
Primary mission objectives:

- Stereoscopic imaging of clouds and other atmospheric structures.
- Formation flying - the satellites will operate as a network to synchronize targeting and data acquisition and to relay health and status information among the satellites in the constellation.
- End-to-End Data Systems (EEDS) will support automated operations, react to unplanned faults and opportunities, and to optimize operations and data handling.

Secondary mission objectives:

- Demonstrate micro propulsion, by increasing the satellites' altitude to extend mission lifetime and improve data gathering capacity.
- Demonstrate a modular spacecraft bus design.
- Emphasize student education by allowing students to actively participate in the program.

The spacecraft were equipped with robust execution management software (Spacecraft Command Language (SCL), Continuous Activity Scheduling Planning Execution and Replanning (CASPER) software, and Context-sensitive anomaly detection software (SELMON monitoring system)).
