= USA-223 =

American reconnaissance satellite

- Mission type: ELINT
- Operator: US NRO
- COSPAR ID: 2010-063A
- SATCAT no.: 37232

Spacecraft properties
- Spacecraft type: Orion

Start of mission
- Launch date: 21 November 2010, 22:58 UTC
- Rocket: Delta IV Heavy D351
- Launch site: Cape Canaveral SLC-37B
- Contractor: ULA

Orbital parameters
- Reference system: Geocentric
- Regime: Geosynchronous
- Longitude: 100.9° east
- Perigee altitude: 35,601 kilometers (22,121 mi)
- Apogee altitude: 35,985 kilometers (22,360 mi)
- Inclination: 5.09 degrees
- Period: 23.93 hours
- Epoch: 14 May 2013, 18:44:29 UTC

USA-223, known before launch as NRO Launch 32 (NRO L-32), is an American reconnaissance satellite which was launched in 2010. It is operated by the United States National Reconnaissance Office. It presently holds the record for being the largest spy satellite ever launched.

Whilst details of its mission are officially classified, amateur observers have identified USA-223 as an Orion satellite; the seventh in the Magnum/Orion series. Orion spacecraft are used for electronic signals intelligence, and carry large antennas to enable them to intercept radio transmissions. These antennas are believed to have a diameter of around 100 metres (330 ft). Bruce A. Carlson, the director of the NRO, described the spacecraft as being the largest satellite ever launched.

USA-223 was launched by United Launch Alliance, aboard a Delta IV Heavy carrier rocket flying from Space Launch Complex 37B at the Cape Canaveral Air Force Station. The launch occurred at 22:58 UTC on 21 November 2010. Following liftoff the rocket flew East towards a geosynchronous orbit. By 23:05 UTC, official updates on the status of the launch had been discontinued.

== See also ==
- USA-202
