= Sentient (intelligence analysis system) =

U.S. government AI system

- Future Ground Architecture

Agency overview
- Type: Classified AI‑powered satellite intelligence‑analysis system
- Jurisdiction: United States federal government
- Headquarters: Chantilly, Virginia, U.S.; 38°52′55″N 77°27′03″W
- Employees: Classified
- Annual budget: Classified
- Agency executive: Christopher Scolese, Director; Troy Meink, Principal Deputy Director; Major General Christopher S. Povak, Deputy Director
- Parent agency: National Reconnaissance Office
- Child agency: Advanced Systems and Technology Directorate
- Website: nro.gov

Footnotes
- Most program details remain classified.

Sentient is a classified artificial intelligence (AI)–powered satellite-based intelligence analysis system developed and operated by the National Reconnaissance Office (NRO) of the United States. Described as an artificial brain, Sentient autonomously processes orbital and terrestrial sensor data to detect, track, and forecast activity on and above Earth. The system integrates machine learning with real-time tip-and-cue functionality, enabling coordinated retasking of reconnaissance satellites without human input.

Using multimodal intelligence data—from imagery and signals to communications and environmental feeds—Sentient is said to anticipate future events, prioritize targets, and serve as the predictive core of the NRO's Future Ground Architecture. Development and core buildout occurred from 2010 to 2016 under the NRO's Advanced Systems and Technology Directorate. Sentient is said to reduce analyst workload by automating routine surveillance tasks, enabling faster detection of threats and more responsive satellite coordination.

== History ==
Sentient is a jointly developed program led by the NRO's Advanced Systems and Technology Directorate (AS&T). Sentient is sometimes reported on and referred to as the Future Ground Architecture (FGA) program. In 2015, then-NRO Director (DNRO) Betty J. Sapp reported to SIGNAL Magazine that Sentient was named the Sentient Enterprise Program. As a classified program, public details on Sentient's architecture and operations remain limited.

As reported by Sarah Scoles in The Verge and the Federation of American Scientists (FAS), Sentient began as early as October 2010. Following the declassification of its FY 2010 Congressional Budget Justification (Volume IV), the NRO issued a request for information (RFI) soliciting white papers on user interaction, self‑awareness, cognitive processing and process automation. NRO reporting indicates Sentient's core development phase ran through 2016.

At the 2013 GEOINT Symposium, then-DNRO Betty J. Sapp stated that Sentient was intended to make the NRO not only reactive but predictive in how it directs space-based assets. Sentient was further discussed in a 2014 edition of NRL Review, published by the Naval Research Laboratory (NRL). By 2015, Sentient had become the lynchpin of the FGA approach; it transitioned to horizontally networked ground stations that enable rapid software‑defined updates to "dumb" satellites. In 2016, the NRO's Principal Deputy Director (PDDNRO) Frank Calvelli briefed the House Armed Services Committee (HASC) on Sentient, discussing how the program makes collection of geospatial and signals intelligence more efficient by reducing stovepiping of data. The American Nuclear Society reported the annual budget of the Sentient program as $238 million USD in the 2015–2017 period. In March 2017, the NRO completed a briefing for the Senate Armed Services Committee (SASC) related to Sentient.

At the 39th Space Symposium in April 2024, PDDNRO Troy Meink announced plans to launch a more diverse fleet of large and small satellites to reduce satellite revisit times, improving global coverage and making the system more reliable. The FAS noted that satellite reconnaissance underpins U.S. situational awareness by enabling rapid, risk‑free collection anywhere in the world. DNRO Sapp stated that Sentient had been the subject of more demonstration requests than any other capability developed by the agency since its founding in 1959.

== Purpose and scope ==
Sentient is a system that combines human-assisted and automated machine-to-machine learning processes. As an autonomous analytical system likened to an artificial brain, Sentient is capable of processing vast and diverse data streams, identifying patterns across time, and directing satellite resources toward areas it evaluates as most significant. According to the Rand Corporation, Sentient frees analysts to concentrate on the "so what?" of intelligence, rather than the "what".

A key advantage of Sentient is its automating of routine data collection tasks through fully automated, real‑time fusion of diverse sensor data streams for intelligence support. By automating routine exploitation workflows, Sentient allows personnel to focus on higher‑level analysis. It is designed to incorporate a range of intelligence sources, including international communications, historical intelligence archives, and reports from human operatives. Automated tools such as Sentient can boost "intelligence equities" in areas like oceanic shipping and sanctions busting by authoritarian states.

Sentient improves situational awareness by using patterns in behavior and past intelligence to predict likely adversary actions. The system via anomaly‑detection and modeling can predict adversary behavior as part of real‑time automated analytics of the battlespace. Comparable systems—such as automatic target recognition (ATR)—can remove human bottlenecks in time‑sensitive analysis by forecasting future actions from past patterns. Sentient interprets incoming data in context and autonomously identifies future intelligence and collection requirements. In 2025, DNRO Christopher Scolese stated at an Intelligence and National Security Alliance and AFCEA International event that the agency aims to move from manually tasking individual satellites to AI-enabled constellations that can interpret plain-language user queries and autonomously coordinate sensors to deliver integrated intelligence reports.

== Features ==
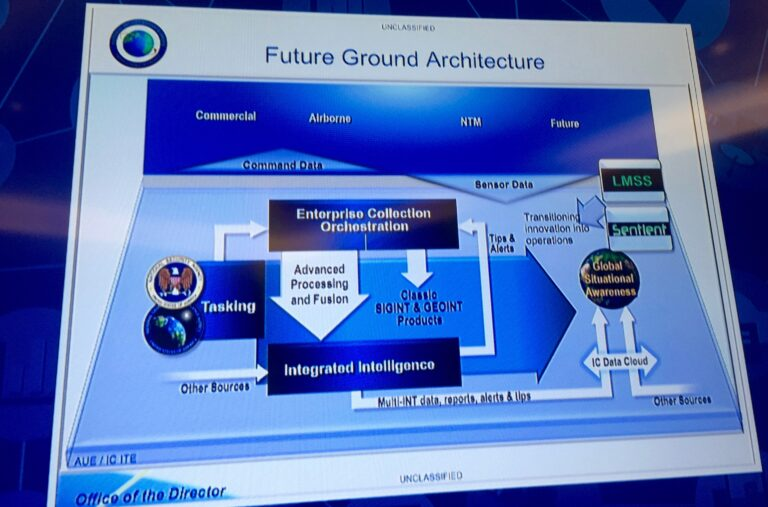
A portion of a presentation by DNRO Sapp was shown at the GEOINT Symposium 2016.

Sentient employs tipping and queueing—part of an AI‑driven orchestration layer—to dynamically retask reconnaissance satellites to observe specific targets. Tipping and queueing refers to the automated process of using information from one satellite, sensor, or data source to direct others to observe a specific area, enabling real-time tracking through coordinated handoffs between systems. Sentient hands off tracking duties across satellite constellations (collections of satellites) and associated Earth-based stations (surface listening and communications systems that receive data from the satellites). By 2024, the NRO had announced plans to field a mix of small and large reconnaissance satellites across orbital regimes—from low, medium and geosynchronous orbits—to increase how often any part of Earth can be observed and improve space‑based coverage of high‑value targets.

Fusing the diverse information and data sourced from its constellation—spanning orbital imagery, signal intercepts, and other feeds, Sentient builds a unified, actionable common operational picture. In that fused big picture, Sentient applies algorithms to spot unexpected or non-traditional observables that human analysts may miss. Using forecasting models to predict adversary courses of action—from force movements to emerging threats—Sentient then adjusts satellite retasking in near real‑time. The cycle requires minimal human intervention and intelligence analysts are freed to focus on interpretation and decision‑making rather than data wrangling and sifting.

A declassified 2019 NRO document shows Sentient collects complex information buried in noisy data and extracts the relevant pieces, freeing analysts to refocus on situational understanding via predictive analytics and automated tasking. The NRO fielded CubeSats—small, cube‑form satellites—to validate resilient, distributed remote sensing. It also prioritized on-demand wide-area monitoring via new phenomenological models to detect and geolocate targets, enhanced collection against weak signals and low-reflectance objects in dense clutter and co-channel interference environments, and advanced phased array technologies to improve overall performance. The NRO's Aerospace Data Facilities (ADF)—Colorado, East, and Southwest—provide ground support for intelligence collection.

== Data sources ==
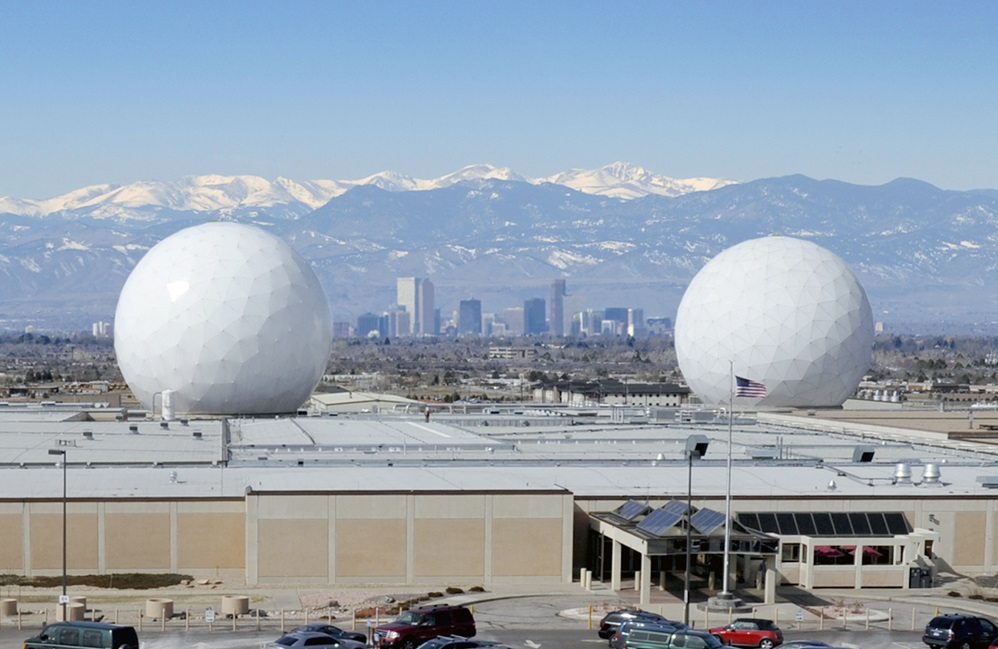
Aerospace Data Facility-Colorado on Buckley Space Force Base

Andrew Krepinevich details the commercial providers contracted to fuel Sentient's analytics—namely Maxar Technologies, Planet, and BlackSky. Maxar has claimed it "provides 90 percent of the foundational geospatial intelligence used by the U.S. government" and was initially its sole imagery supplier. In The Fragile Dictator: Counterintelligence Pathologies in Authoritarian States, Wege and Mobley compare Sentient to Spaceflight Industries' commercial Blacksky Global service. According to Krepinevich, BlackSky "hoovers up" volumes of raw collateral—dozens of satellites, over a hundred million mobile devices, plus ships, planes, social networks, and environmental sensors—to feed Sentient's big‑data pipelines. Retired Central Intelligence Agency (CIA) analyst Allen Thomson observes that the system aspires to ingest "everything", from imagery to financial records to weather data and more.

== Risks ==
Army Captain Anjanay Kumar warned in 2021 that although the system itself is secure, its distributed ground infrastructure could be vulnerable to adversary attack. Krepinevich cautions of the "avalanche" of data available from intelligence, military, and commercial sources that would overwhelm human analysts.

== See also ==
- Amrom Harry Katz
- Applications of artificial intelligence
- Structured Geospatial Analytic Method
- Synthetic Environment for Analysis and Simulations
