= Integrated Overhead SIGINT Architecture =

Spy satellite system of the United States

Integrated Overhead SIGINT Architecture, or IOSA, incorrectly reported to be codenamed Intruder, was a spy satellite system to be operated by the United States National Reconnaissance Office, which would have replaced the Mentor and Mercury systems. The satellites were reported to have been under development in 1995. The Intruder system was designed to combine the electronic signals intelligence (ELINT) and communications intelligence (COMINT) roles of signals Intelligence (SIGINT) spacecraft, which had previously been performed by different satellites, the Rhyolite and Vortex series respectively.

It was reported that NROL-26 may be the launch designation for the first Intruder satellite. NROL-26 was scheduled to launch in 2005 on a Delta IVH from launch complex Space Launch Complex 37B at the Cape Canaveral Air Force Station, but was delayed due to a number of issues. It launched on 17 January 2009, and subsequently designated USA-202. Documents leaked in 2013 however showed that recent launches had been of Orion satellites - an alternative name for the Mentor series. The same document also confirmed that the reported codename for IOSA, Intruder, was associated with a different programme; the Naval Ocean Surveillance System.
