= USA-171 =

American SIGINT satellite

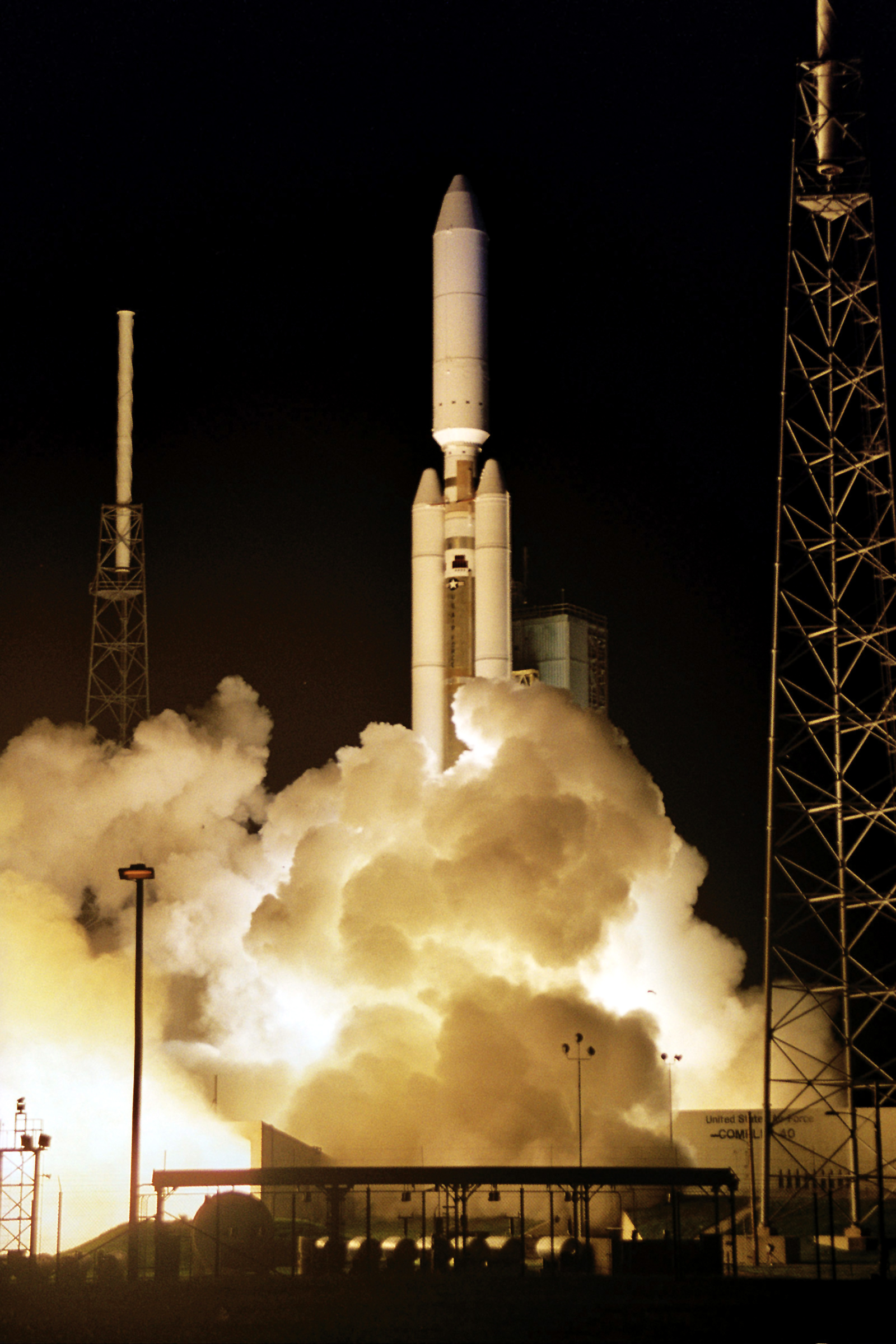
- Launch of USA-171
- Mission type: SIGINT
- Operator: NRO/CIA
- COSPAR ID: 2003-041A

Spacecraft properties
- Spacecraft type: Orion
- Manufacturer: Northrop Grumman

Start of mission
- Launch date: 9 September 2003 04:29 UTC
- Rocket: Titan IV (401)B/Centaur-T (B-36/TC-20)
- Launch site: Cape Canaveral, SLC-40
- Contractor: Lockheed Martin

Orbital parameters
- Reference system: Geocentric orbit
- Regime: Geosynchronous orbit
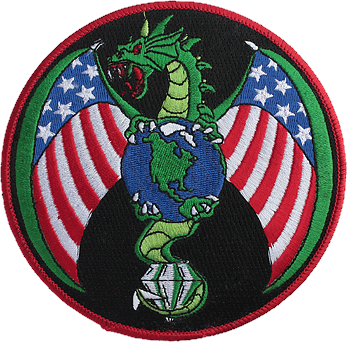
- Orion Series

USA-171 (also known Orion-5, Homer and NROL-19) is an American SIGINT reconnaissance satellite which is operated by the National Reconnaissance Office. Launched in September 2003, it is the secret Orion satellite.

== Overview ==
This is the last Orion satellite launch on Titan IV rocket and last launch of Titan IV (401)B/Centaur-T Version and last Titan IV launch with extremely long metallic fairing and future Orion mission will launch on the Delta IV Heavy rocket.

Orion also known as Mentor is a SIGINT/ELINT satellite build to replace Magnum satellite and the COMINT capability also made Orion a replacement for the Mercury satellite. It is called that the satellite has a reflector of a diameter as big as ~100m

== See also ==
- List of USA satellites
- List of NRO Launches
