= USA-353 =

American SIGINT satellite

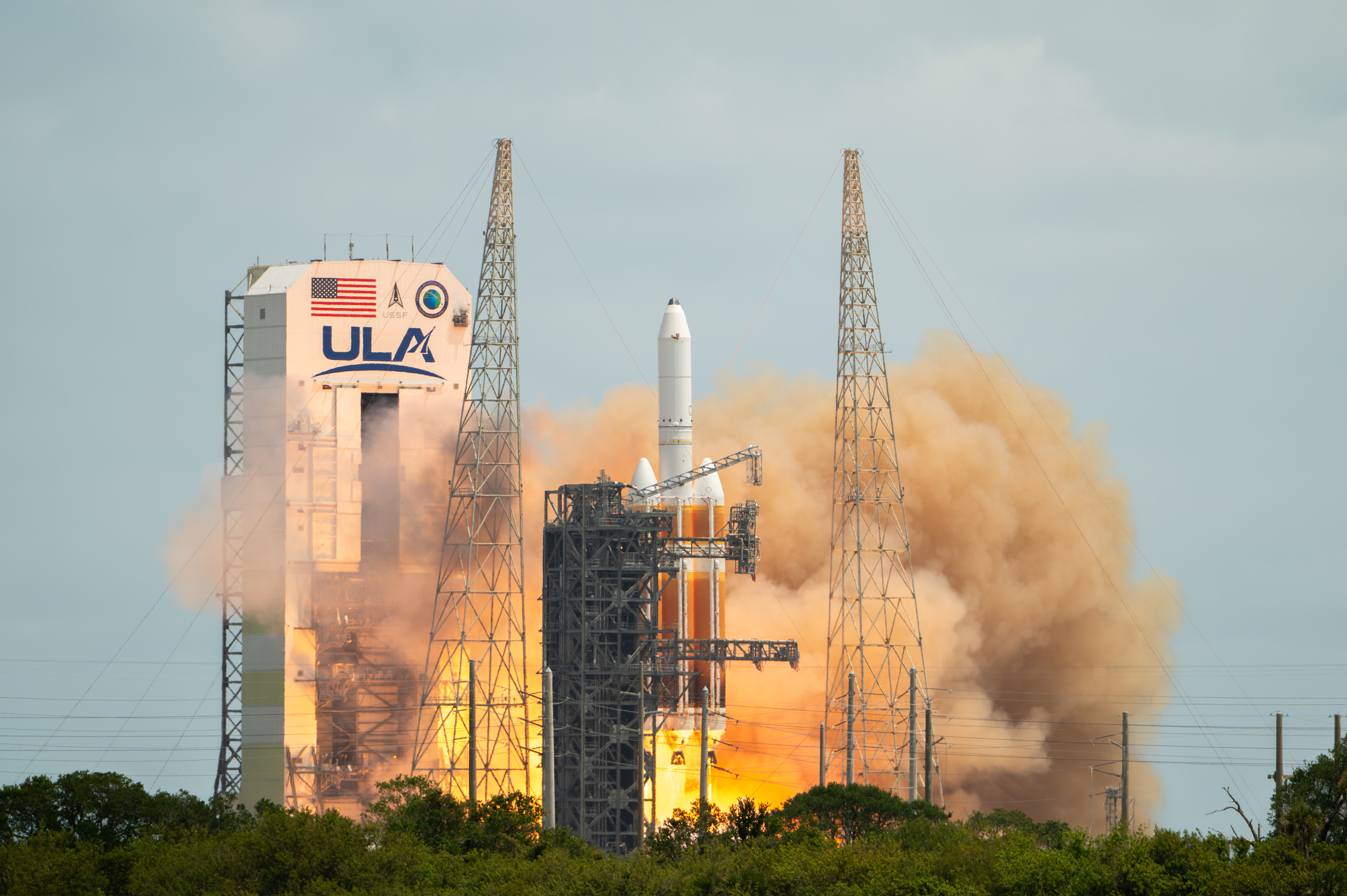
- Launch of USA-353
- Mission type: SIGINT
- Operator: NRO/CIA
- COSPAR ID: 2024-067A
- SATCAT no.: 59453

Spacecraft properties
- Spacecraft type: Orion
- Manufacturer: Northrop Grumman

Start of mission
- Launch date: 09 April 2024 16:53 UTC
- Rocket: Delta IV Heavy (D-389)
- Launch site: Cape Canaveral, SLC-37B
- Contractor: United Launch Alliance

Orbital parameters
- Reference system: Geocentric orbit
- Regime: Geosynchronous orbit
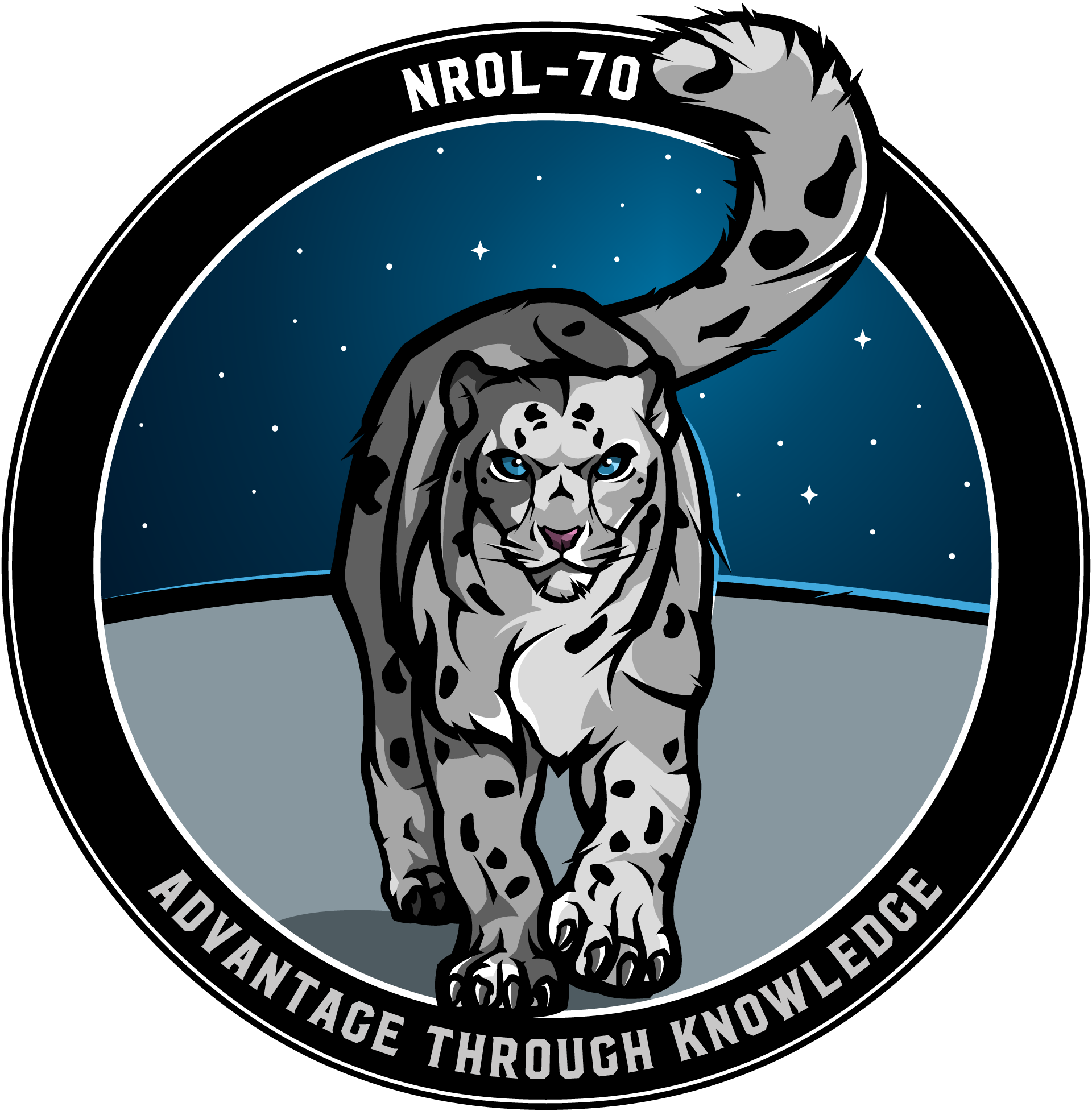
- Orion Series

USA-353 (also known Orion-12 and NROL-70) is an American SIGINT reconnaissance satellite which is operated by the National Reconnaissance Office. Launched in April 2024, it is a secret Orion satellite.

== Overview ==
The satellite launched on the final Delta IV Heavy and Delta (rocket family) mission, ending the family's decades of service to US national security missions.

Orion also known as Mentor is a SIGINT/ELINT satellite build to replace Magnum satellite and the COMINT capability also made Orion a replacement for the Mercury satellite. It is called that the satellite has a reflector of a diameter as big as ~100 m.

== Gallery ==
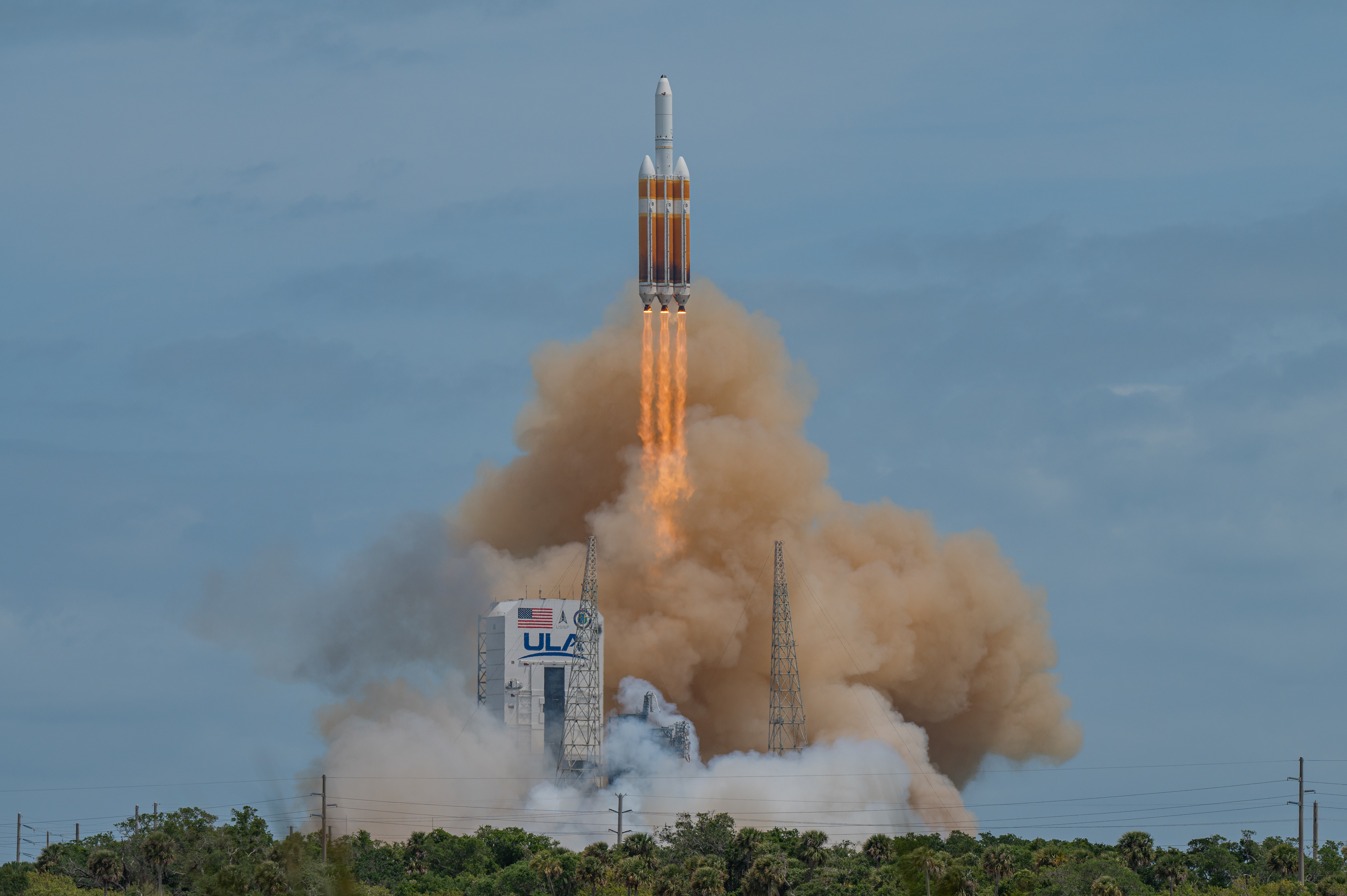

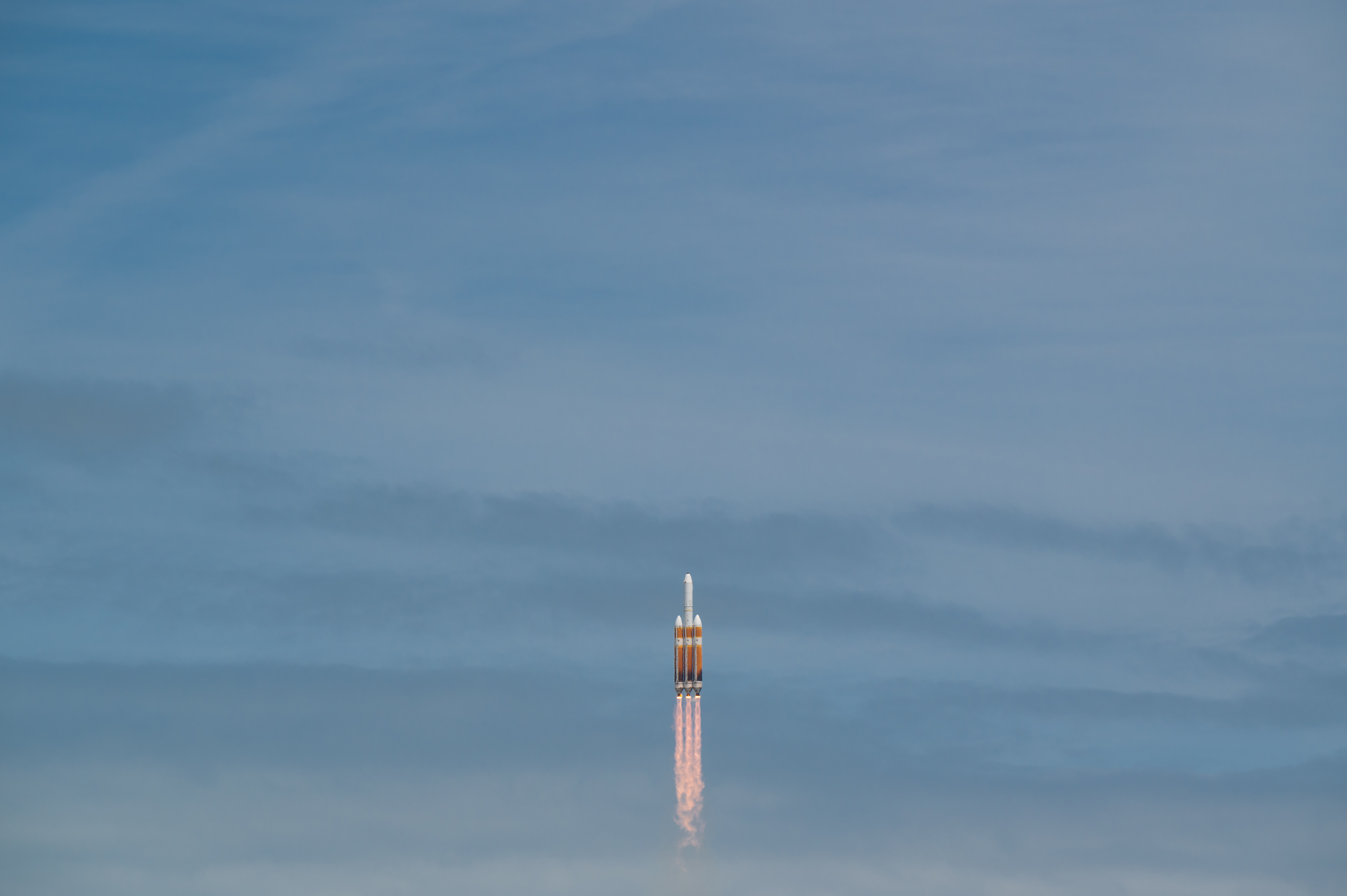

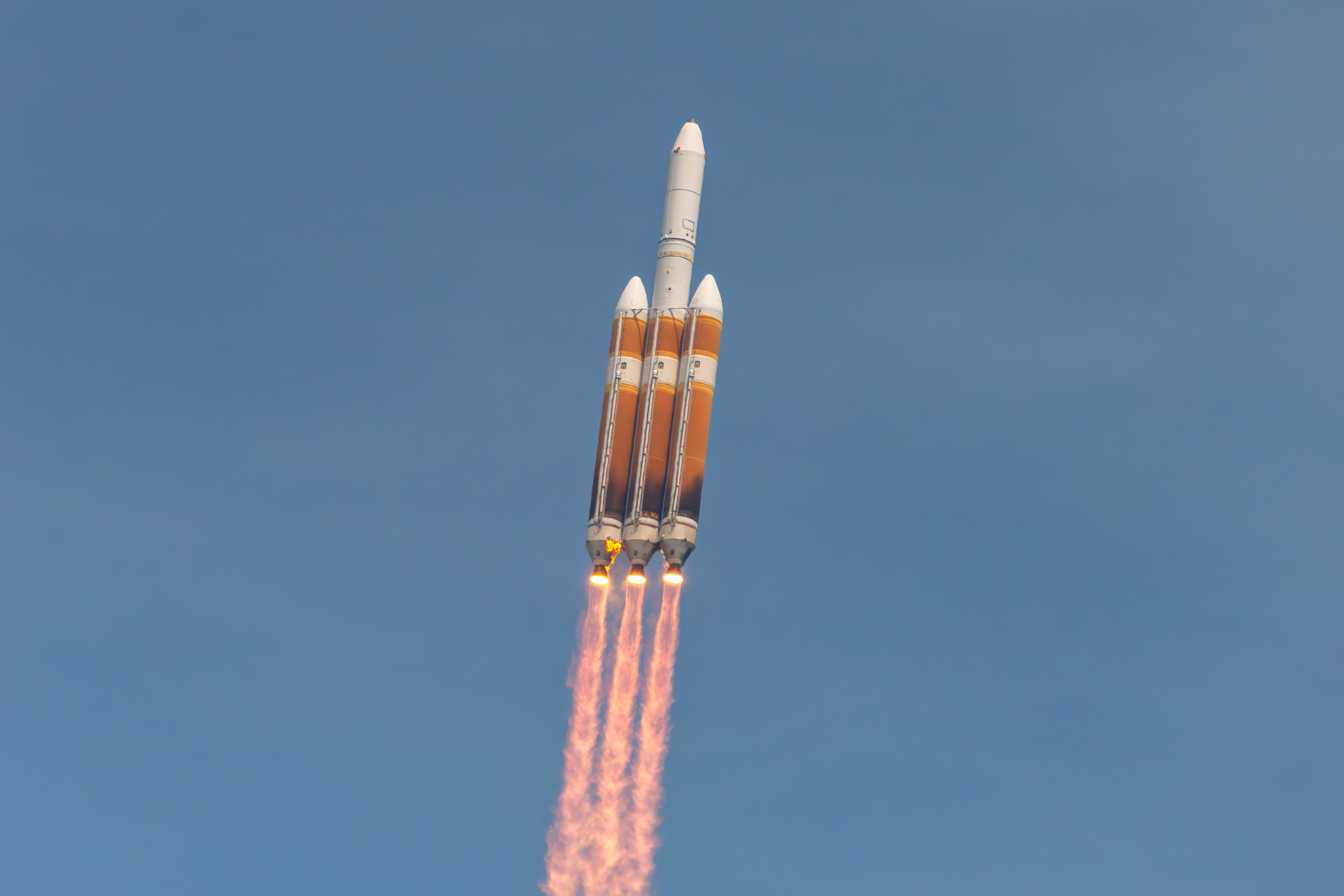

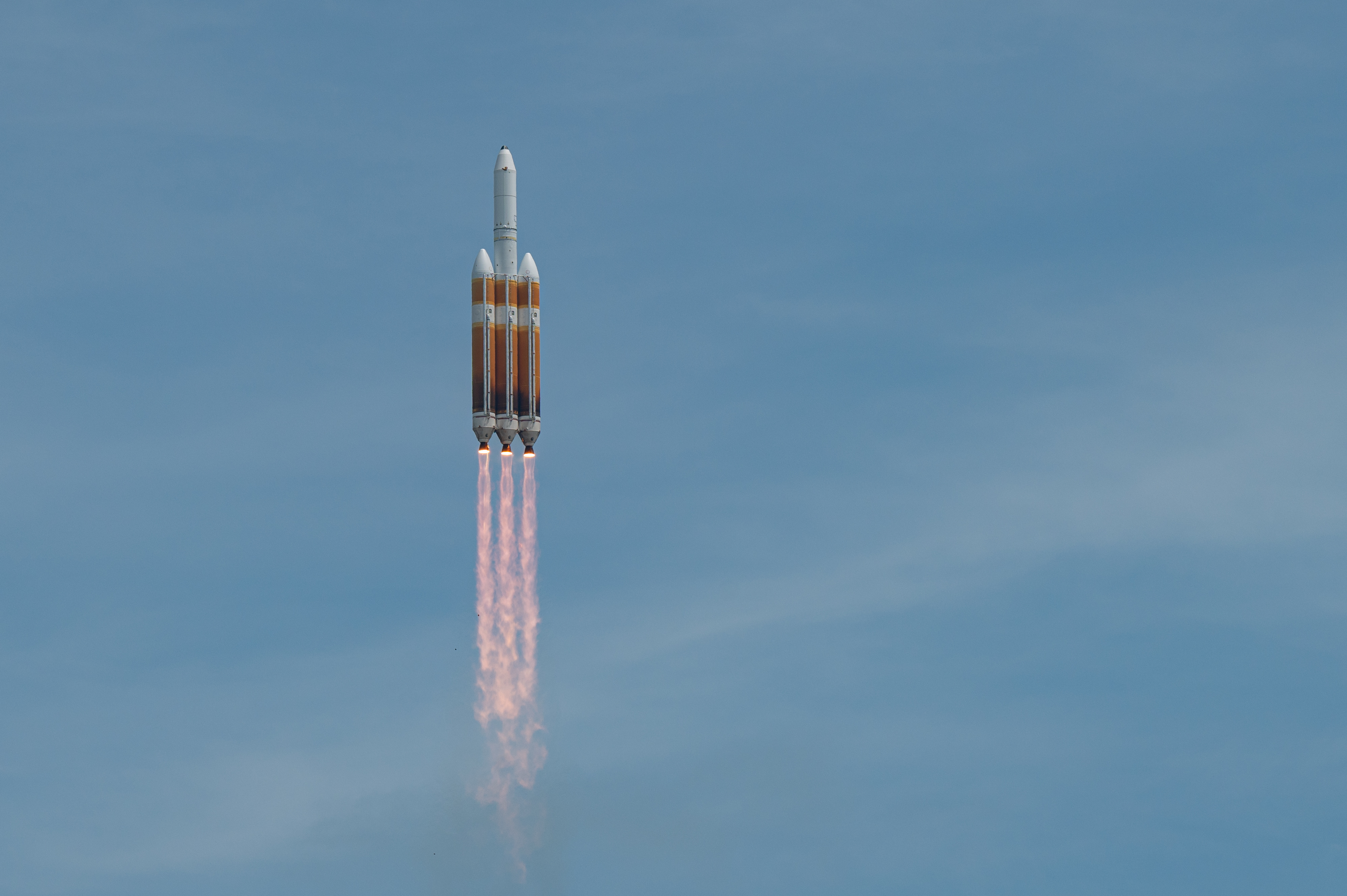

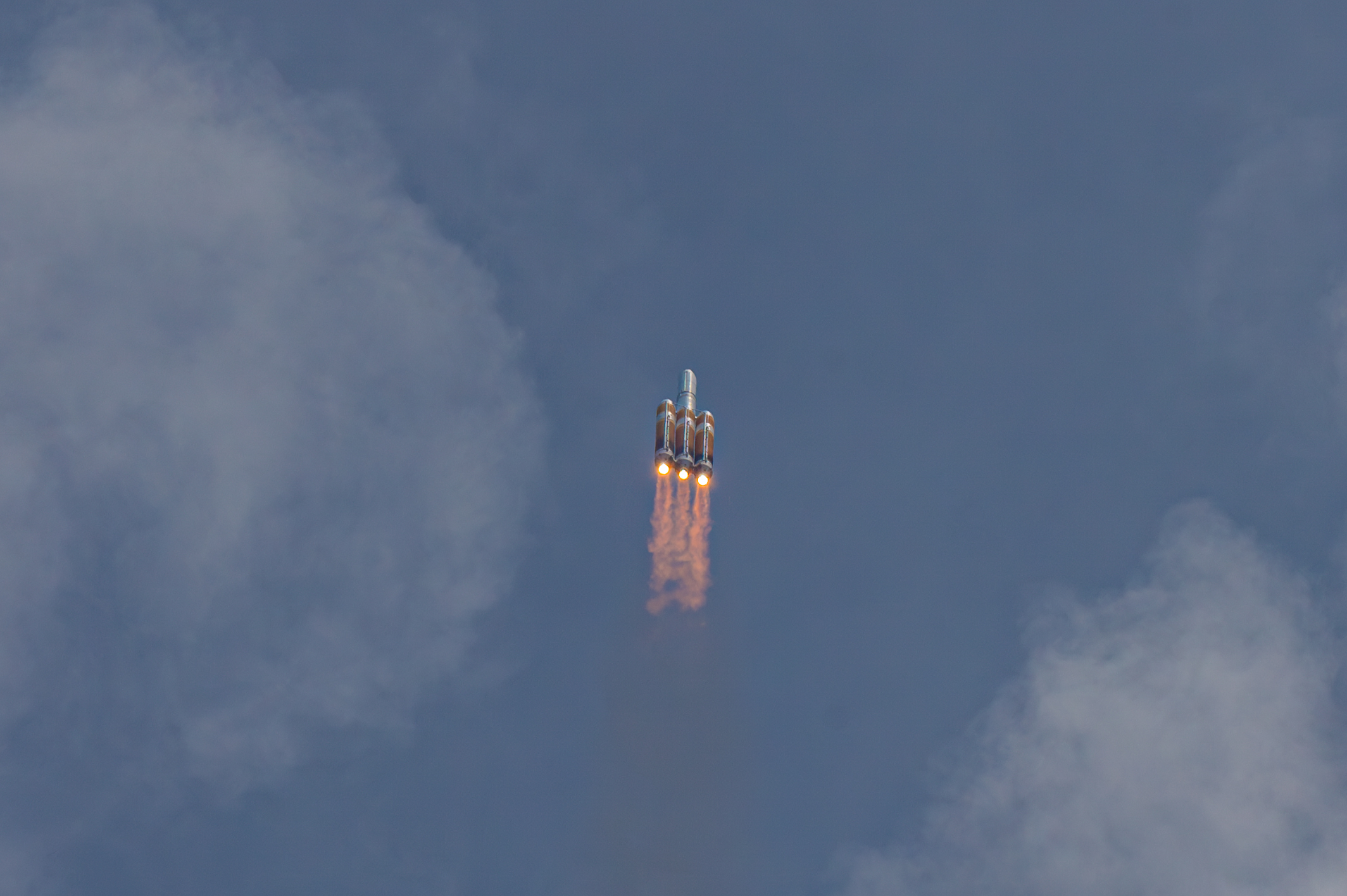

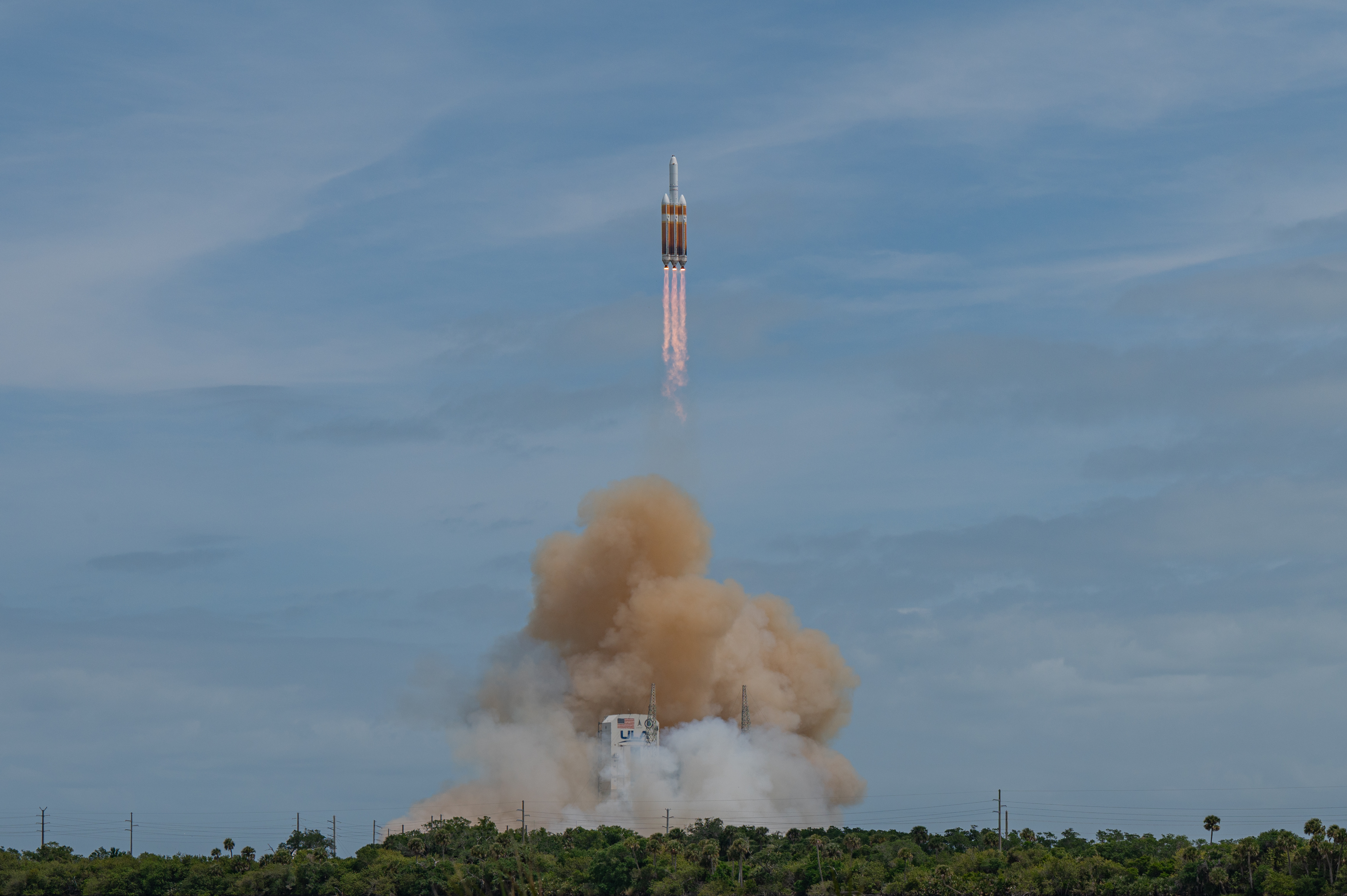

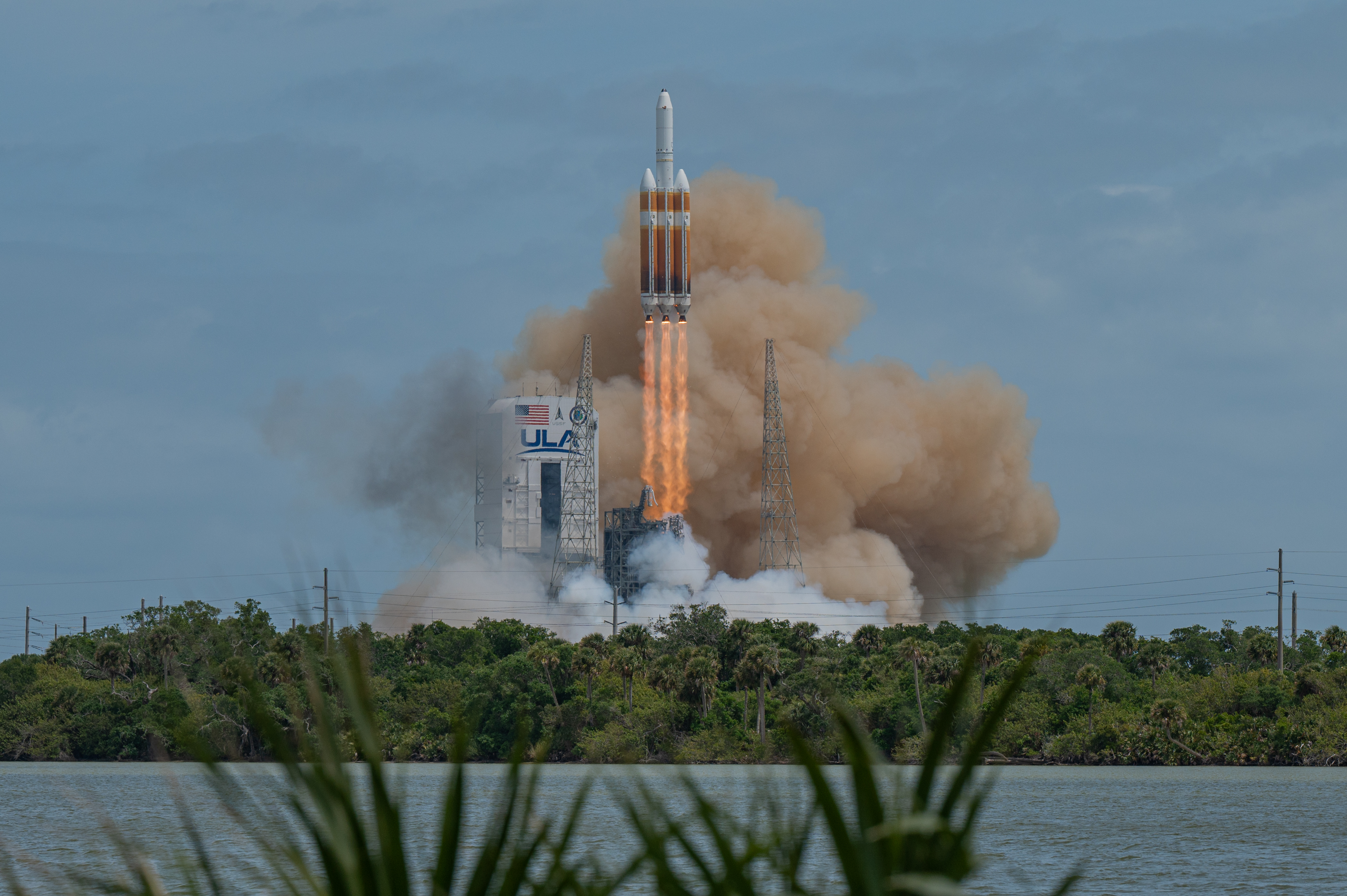

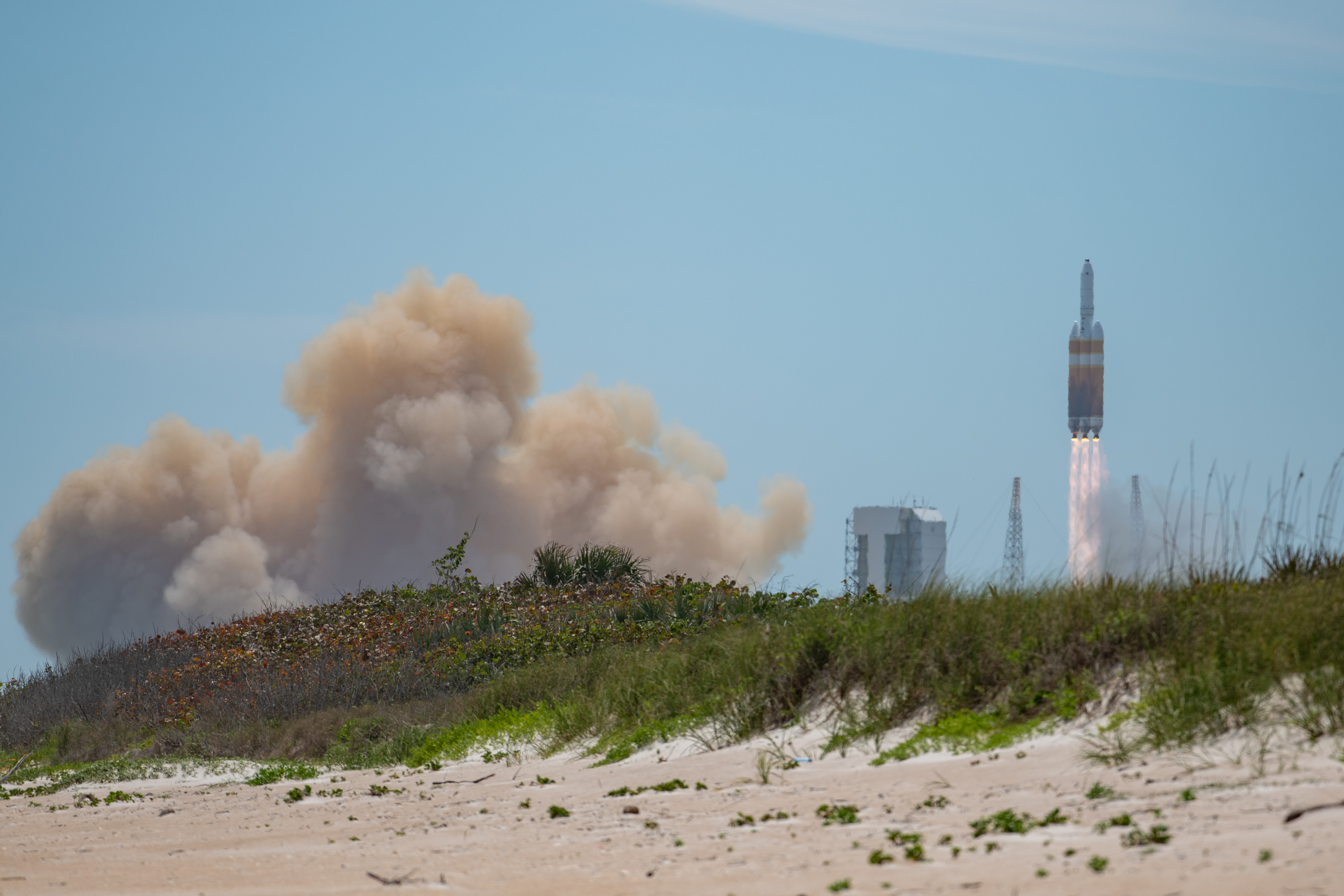

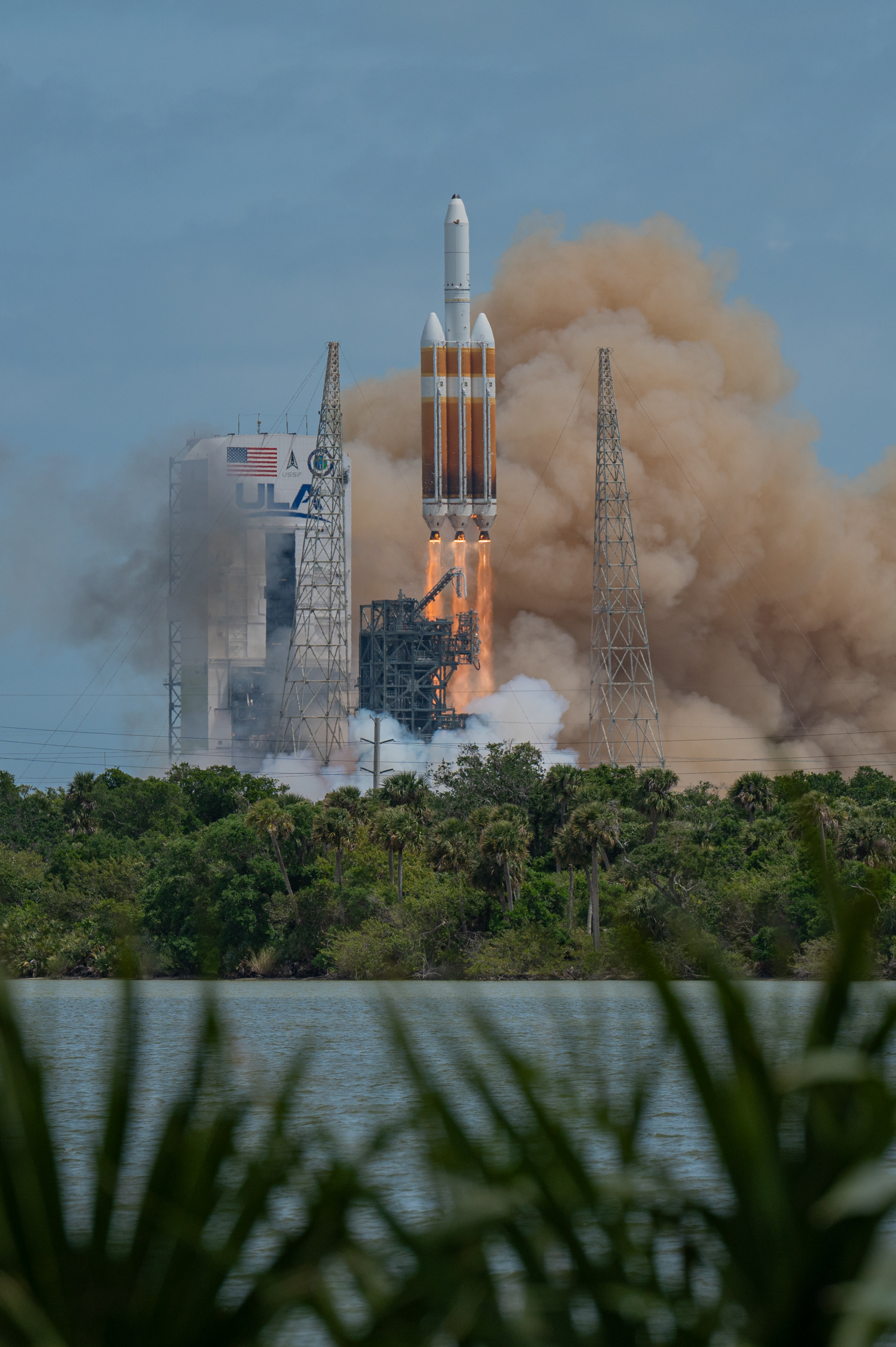

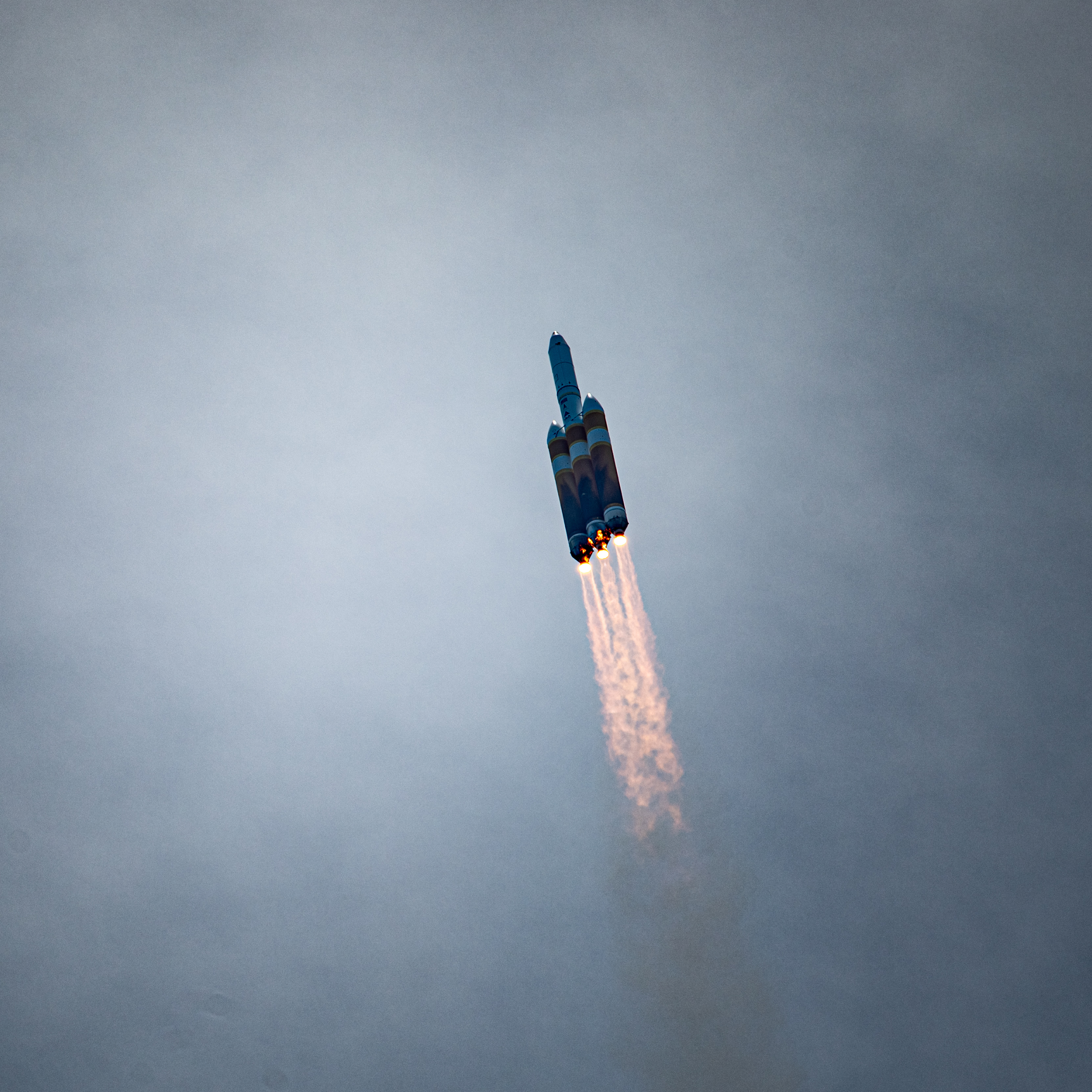

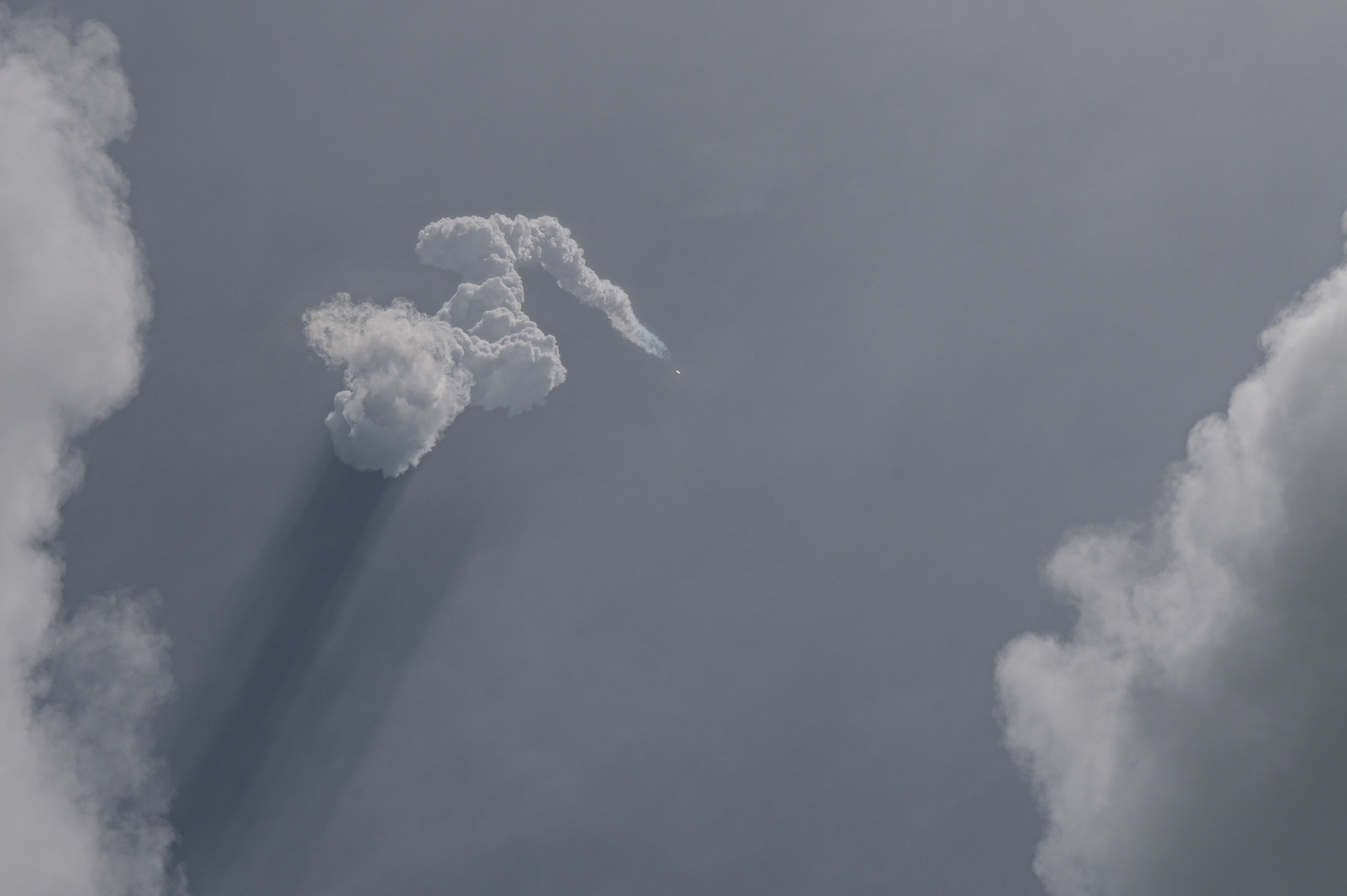

== See also ==
- List of USA satellites
- List of NRO Launches
- National Security Space Launch
