= Ralph Haller =

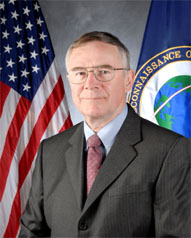

12th Principal Deputy Director of the National Reconnaissance Office
- In office 2007–2009
- President: George W. Bush
- Preceded by: Scott F. Large
- Succeeded by: Betty J. Sapp

Ralph Haller was the twelfth deputy director of the National Reconnaissance Office.

The Principal Deputy Director of the NRO reports to and coordinates with the Director of the NRO on all NRO activities. The PDDNRO provides overall day-to-day management of the NRO with decision responsibility as delegated by the DNRO and, in the absence of the DNRO, acts on behalf of the DNRO on all matters.
