= David Kier =

American government official

David A. Kier

9th Principal Deputy Director of the National Reconnaissance Office
- In office 31 May 1997 – 9 Aug 2001
- President: Bill Clinton
- Preceded by: Keith R. Hall
- Succeeded by: Dennis D. Fitzgerald

David A. Kier was the ninth Principal Deputy Director of the National Reconnaissance Office (PDDNRO). He is a 1965 graduate of Washington & Jefferson College.
