= Scott F. Large =

American intelligence officer

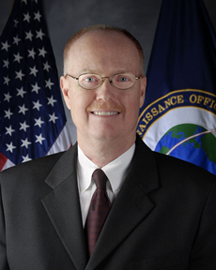

16th Director of the National Reconnaissance Office
- In office October 19, 2007 – April 18, 2009
- President: George W. Bush; Barack Obama
- Preceded by: Donald M. Kerr
- Succeeded by: Bruce Carlson

11th Principal Deputy Director of the National Reconnaissance Office
- In office April 2, 2007 – October 19, 2007
- President: George W. Bush
- Preceded by: Dennis D. Fitzgerald
- Succeeded by: Ralph Haller

Personal details
- Born: February 22, 1955 (age 71) Buffalo, New York, U.S.
- Education: University of Central Florida
- Profession: Intelligence officer

Scott F. Large (born February 22, 1955) is an American intelligence officer who served as the sixteenth Director of the National Reconnaissance Office from 2007 to 2009. He previously served as the Principal Deputy Director of the National Reconnaissance Office from April to October 2007, and as the Central Intelligence Agency's Associate Deputy Director for Science and Technology.

== Personal life ==
Large received a Bachelor of Science degree in Engineering in 1979 from the University of Central Florida, majoring in electro-optics and semiconductor devices. Before joining the government, he spent seven years in industry, during which time he received three patents in fiber optics technology.

== Career ==
Large joined the Central Intelligence Agency (CIA) in 1986 as a Project Management Engineer in the Office of Development and Engineering developing advanced spacecraft payloads at the NRO. He held various senior development and systems engineering positions within the NRO's Imagery Systems Acquisition and Operations Directorate through 1996. Also during this time, he served one year as the Executive Assistant to the Director of the NRO. In 1997, he became Deputy Director of the Future Imagery Architecture Program.

A year later, Large was appointed the Deputy Chief for Programs within the CIA Directorate of Operations' Technical Management Office. In this position, he helped administer a joint national program while assisting in the development of the program's strategic plan and program management process. In 2000, he was selected as Director of the Clandestine Signals Intelligence Operations Group in the Office of Technical Collection within the CIA's Directorate of Science and Technology. While there, he led the development and execution of critical collection operations for the Intelligence Community. In September 2000, he became the Deputy Director of the Office of Technical Collection.

Beginning in August 2001, Large served as the CIA's Associate Deputy Director for Science and Technology. Following that assignment, he moved back to the NRO to serve as the Director, Imagery Systems Acquisition and Operations Directorate, from July 2003 to November 2006. Large became the second Principal Deputy Director of the National Reconnaissance Office (NRO) and Deputy Assistant to the Secretary of the Air Force (Intelligence Space Technology) on April 2, 2007. Prior to these appointments, he was the Director, Source Operations and Management Directorate at the National Geospatial-Intelligence Agency (NGA). He tendered his resignation as DNRO on April 8, 2009, effective April 18, 2009.

His awards include the NRO Meritorious Service Medal, the NRO Superior Service Medal, the CIA Intelligence Commendation Medal, the CIA Director's Award, the NSA Director’s Award, the DIA Director’s Award, the NGA Medallion for Excellence, the NGA Distinguished Civilian Service Medal, the National Intelligence Distinguished Service Medal, the Secretary of Defense Medal for Exceptional Service and the CIA Distinguished Career Intelligence Medal.
