= Dennis D. Fitzgerald =

First Principal Deputy Director of the National Reconnaissance Office

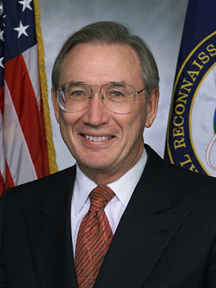

1st Principal Deputy Director of the National Reconnaissance Office
- In office 10 August 2001 – 1 April 2007
- President: George W. Bush
- Preceded by: David Kier
- Succeeded by: Scott F. Large

Personal details
- Born: February 28, 1943
- Died: December 31, 2008 (aged 65) Reston, Virginia, U.S.

Dennis D. Fitzgerald (February 28, 1943 – December 31, 2008) was the first Principal Deputy Director of the National Reconnaissance Office

In announcing the passing of Dennis Fitzgerald, Director of the NRO Scott F. Large noted “Dennis had dedicated 33 years of government service to our nation upon his retirement from the Central Intelligence Agency (CIA) in April of 2007.” He was the first Principal Deputy Director of the NRO, the Deputy Assistant to the Secretary of the Air Force (Intelligence Space Technology), the Director of the CIA’s Office of Development and Engineering, Directorate for Science and Technology, and the Associate Deputy Director for Science and Technology.

== Early life and education ==
- Born 28 February 1943 in New Haven, Connecticut.
- Bachelor of Science, Physics, Fairfield University, June 1964.
- Four Master of Science degrees: applied physics, mathematics, electrical engineering, and space technology, Johns Hopkins University, 1968 – 1980.

== Awards and decorations ==
- Senior Intelligence Service Distinguished Officer Award.
- Senior Intelligence Service Meritorious Officer Award.
- Central Intelligence Agency Medal of Merit.
- Central Intelligence Agency Intelligence Commendation Award.
- National Reconnaissance Office Gold Medal.
