= Orion (satellite) =

Class of United States spy satellites

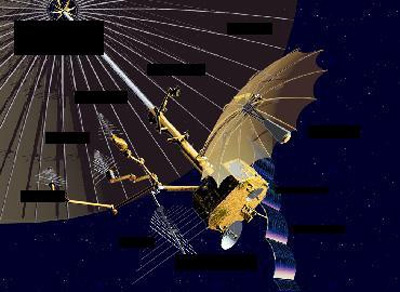
Artist's impression of the Orion Mentor-4 (USA-202) Signals Intelligence Satellite launched in January 2009

Orion, also known as Mentor or Advanced Orion, is a class of United States spy satellites that collect signals intelligence (SIGINT) from space. Operated by the National Reconnaissance Office (NRO) and developed with input from the Central Intelligence Agency (CIA), eight have been launched from Cape Canaveral on Titan IV and Delta IV launch vehicles since 1995.

== Description ==
These satellites at geostationary orbits collect radio emissions (SIGINT) and act as replacements for the older constellation of Magnum satellites. The satellites have estimated mass close to 5,200 kg and very large (estimated 100 m diameter) radio reflecting dishes. USA-223 (NROL-32), which is seen as the fifth satellite in the series, is according to NRO director Bruce Carlson "the largest satellite in the world." It is believed that this refers to the diameter of the main antenna, which might be well in excess of 100 m (330 ft). The mission and capabilities of these satellites are highly classified, though targets may include telemetry, VHF radio, cellular mobile phones, paging signals, and mobile data links. Earlier satellites with similar missions, the Rhyolite/Aquacade series, were built by TRW; it is not known who made the Orion satellites.

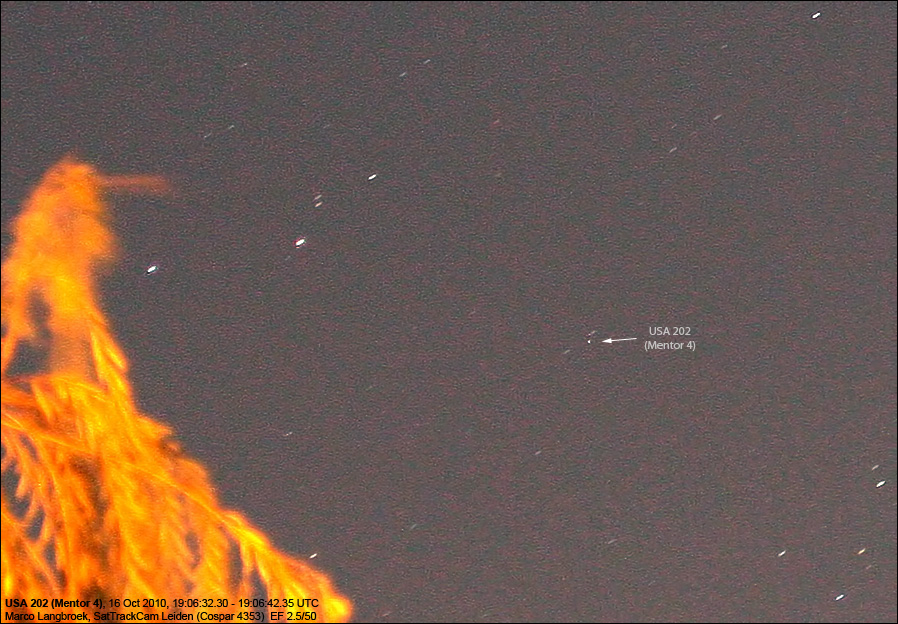
USA-202 shows up as a magnitude +8 "star" in this image. Note how the real stars are trailed in this 10-second exposure: the geostationary satellite is pinpoint.

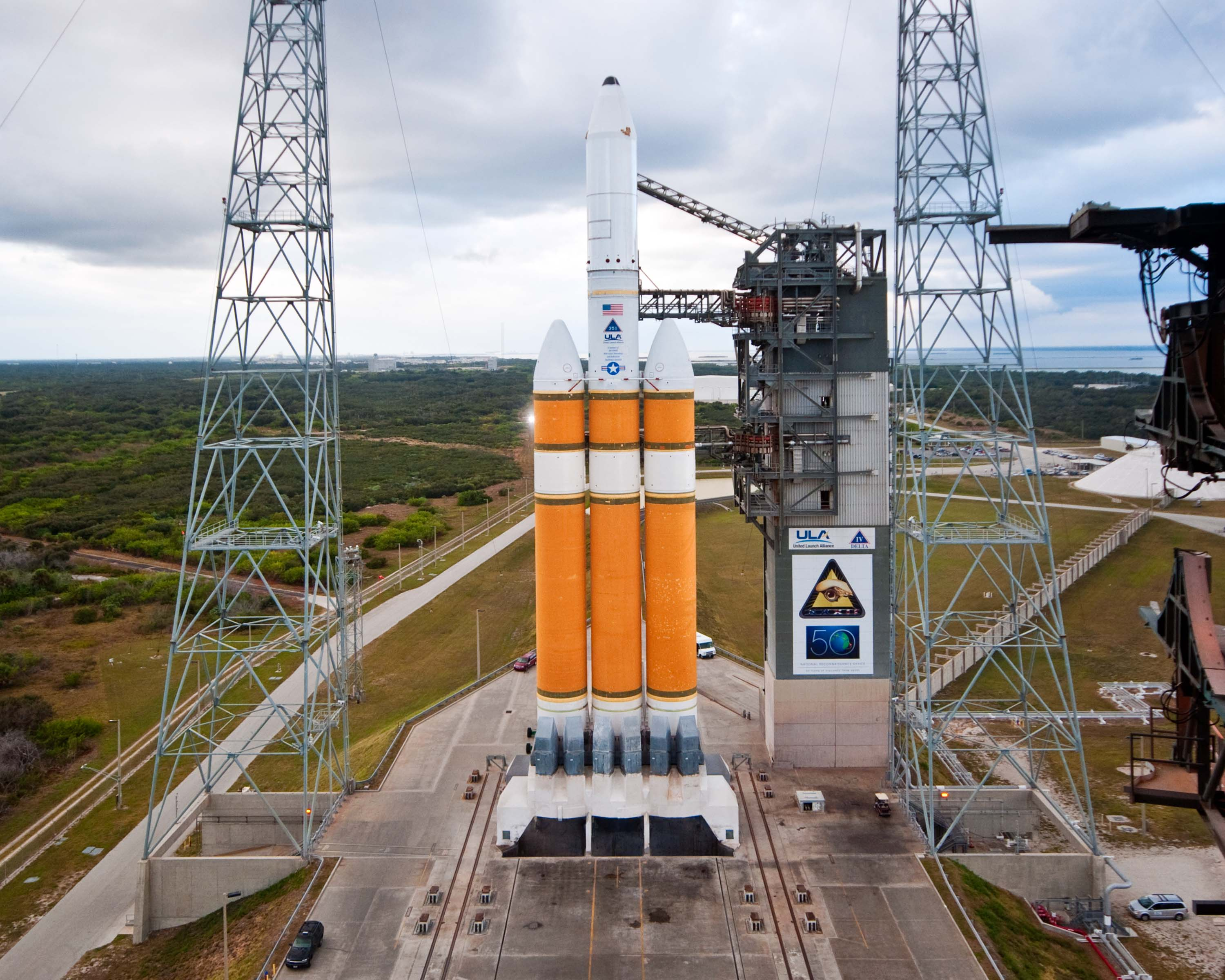
USA-223 (NROL-32), the fifth "Mentor" satellite, atop a Delta IV rocket

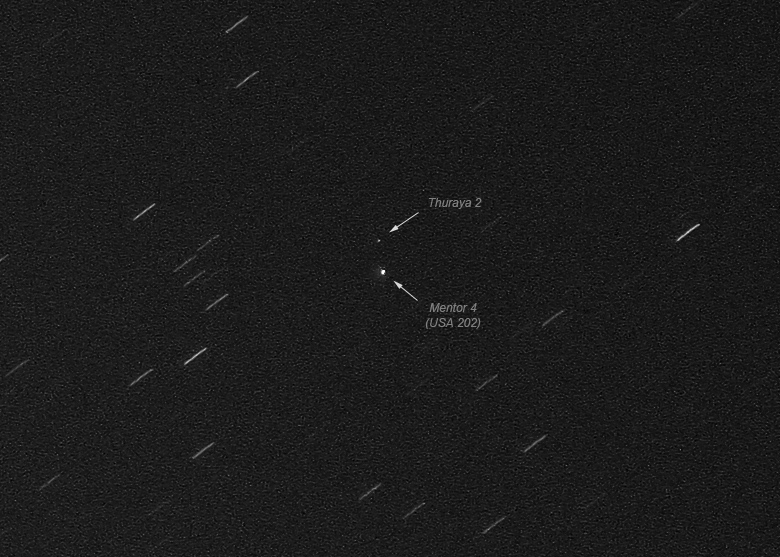
USA-202 and the nearby commercial geostationary satellite Thuraya 2

== Satellites ==
Mentor-4 (USA-202) deployment and initial westward drift after launch in January 2009 was controlled by the Pine Gap base. About 60 days after launch Menwith Hill Ground Station was to take over control and initiate the collection mission. Mentor-4's initial mission was to survey line-of-sight microwave towers and emitters in the People's Republic of China for 30 to 45 days as it was drifting from east to west. Moving further west, it was to collect data from the Thuraya network and monitor Pakistan and Afghanistan, followed by another 200 days of monitoring of China. This was to be followed by data collection covering the Middle East, Northern Africa, and Latin America.

Name	COSPAR ID	Launch date (UTC)	Launch vehicle	Launch site	Launch designation	Longitude	Remarks
USA-110	1995-022A	14 May 1995; 13:45:01	Titan IV(401)A	CCSFS, SLC-40	N/A	127° E	MENTOR 1
USA-139	1998-029A	9 May 1998; 01:38:01	Titan IV(401)B	CCSFS, SLC-40	NROL-6	44° E (1998–2009); 14.5°W (2009–)	MENTOR 2
USA-171	2003-041A	9 September 2003; 04:29:00	Titan IV(401)B	CCSFS, SLC-40	NROL-19	95.5° E	MENTOR 3
USA-202	2009-001A	18 January 2009; 02:47:00	Delta IV Heavy	CCSFS, SLC-37B	NROL-26	44° E	MENTOR 4
USA-223	2010-063A	21 November 2010; 22:58:00	Delta IV Heavy	CCSFS, SLC-37B	NROL-32	100.9° E	MENTOR 5
USA-237	2012-034A	29 June 2012; 13:15:00	Delta IV Heavy	CCSFS, SLC-37B	NROL-15	89.21° E	MENTOR 6
USA-268	2016-036A	11 June 2016; 17:51:00	Delta IV Heavy	CCSFS, SLC-37B	NROL-37	104.18° E	MENTOR 7
USA-311	2020-095A	11 December 2020; 01:09	Delta IV Heavy	CCSFS, SLC-37B	NROL-44	51° E	MENTOR 8
USA-345	2023-089A	22 June 2023; 09:18	Delta IV Heavy	CCSFS, SLC-37B	NROL-68		MENTOR 9
USA-353	2024-067A	9 April 2024 16:53	Delta IV Heavy	CCSFS, SLC-37B	NROL-70		
