= Tip and cue =

Tracking method in satellite imagery

Tip and cue, sometimes referred to as tip and que, tipping and cueing, or tipping and queing, is a method in satellite imagery, remote sensing, and geospatial intelligence in which one sensor, satellite, or platform identifies an area or object of interest and cues another complementary sensor or platform to collect follow-up data. The method may operate within a satellite constellation, across different satellites, or between satellite, aerial, and ground-based systems. Tip and cue is used to improve persistent monitoring, reduce unnecessary collection, and gather information at different resolutions, timescales, and spectral characteristics.

Published work has described tip and cue methods in maritime domain awareness, military space awareness, satellite characterization, search and rescue research, commercial Earth observation, and AI-based mission simulation. Examples include AIS, SAR, and electro-optical satellite coordination for maritime monitoring; tactical sensor tip-and-cue for space surveillance; and automated or AI-based tip-and-cue research for Earth observation.

== Process ==
Tip and cue refers to the process of monitoring an area or object of interest with one sensor and requesting another complementary sensor platform to acquire follow-up imagery or data over the same area. In a typical process, a cost-effective, low-resolution, or wide-field sensor identifies an object or location, and the collected information is passed to a higher-resolution sensor for follow-up investigation and analysis. The process can reduce the amount of data collected and stored while still allowing information to be gathered across varied resolutions, timescales, and spectral characteristics.

The success of a tip-and-cue process depends on factors including latency between the initial collection and the availability of the tip, the type of object being monitored, the accuracy of trajectory estimation for moving objects, and the acquisition possibilities of the cueing sensor. Earlier availability of the tipping image after processing improves the ability of the cueing platform to conduct near real-time follow-up collection. In an example described by ICEYE, one satellite acquires an image of an area of interest containing a vessel and sends a tip to another satellite, which monitors the vessel while considering its trajectory and acquisition conditions.

Complementary sensor systems are used because different sensors have different strengths and limitations. Optical remote-sensing systems can be limited by darkness and cloud cover, while synthetic-aperture radar can provide visibility under conditions where optical systems may be obstructed. Choices of radar imaging mode, polarization, and frequency band affect coverage, resolution, and interaction with materials, surfaces, and vegetation. Because different applications require different sensors and modalities, tip and cue can use sensor characteristics that complement the needs of specific remote-sensing tasks.

Tip and cue systems can involve passive or active scanning methods and can include optical, radar, signal, or infrared characteristics. Some defense-oriented architectures also describe the use of both orbital and ground-based ELINT. Post proposed a tip-and-cue communication protocol in which a satellite producing a positive classification notifies other satellites, a ground station, and designated users.

The process becomes more difficult when the object of interest is moving rather than stationary, because the cueing satellite must account for the object's velocity and the uncertainty of its trajectory. ICEYE identifies latency, object type, trajectory-estimation accuracy, and the acquisition possibilities of the cueing satellite as critical factors in the success of a tip-and-cue process. Automated tip-and-cue systems can reduce manual intervention, delays, and human error by combining object detection and tracking, moving areas of interest, and ground-segment architecture that supports acquisition over moving targets.

== Published research and development ==
In 2012, Becky Cudzilo, K. C. Foley, and Chandler Smith described a small-satellite constellation using AIS and SAR data to tip and cue existing electro-optical satellite assets for maritime domain awareness. Their paper proposed using AIS data to identify broadcasting vessels and SAR data to identify non-broadcasting vessels, with non-broadcasting vessel locations used as tip-off target locations for high-resolution electro-optical satellite collection. The authors described the resulting fused AIS, SAR, and electro-optical report as a way to shorten timelines for tactical responses related to detected non-broadcasting vessels.

In 2015, Raytheon authors described sensor-to-sensor tip and cue as an enabling technology for real-time space awareness and theater operations. The same paper discussed tracking space ISR elements and cueing active and passive apertures through ground and space sensors. In a 2015 speech, Robert Cardillo of the National Geospatial-Intelligence Agency described commercial imagery, small satellites, unmanned airborne systems, ground-based sources, open sources, and cross-INT integration as parts of a broader persistent-GEOINT environment.

Richmond and Brennan of Lockheed Martin, presenting to the annual technical conference of the Maui Space Surveillance Complex (formerly the Air Force Maui Optical Station (AMOS)), discussed the algorithms needed for tip and cue to facilitate multi-phenomenology data fusion. Their satellite-characterization paper described optical, radar, signal, and infrared phenomenologies, along with tip-and-cue points between collectors for multi-phenomenology data-fusion algorithms. The paper connected such fusion to tasks including reacquiring objects after maneuvers, estimating available fuel, and analyzing power-profile considerations.

The Space Surveillance Telescope (SST), later relocated to Naval Communication Station Harold E. Holt in Australia, was reported by the Defense Advanced Research Projects Agency (DARPA) to be leading the development and application of tactical sensor tip-and-cue techniques while also applying its data archive to refine orbital-debris density models. DARPA described SST as a ground-based system for broad-area search, detection, and tracking of faint objects in deep space, including objects in geosynchronous orbit. DARPA also stated that the telescope would be owned by the United States Air Force after relocation and operated and maintained by Australia. DARPA also stated that SST had contributed to the discovery of more than 1,300 new asteroids and provided more than 5,500,000 asteroid observations to the International Astronomical Union's Minor Planet Center.

In 2017, Cassandra R. Post investigated automation of tipping and cueing between small satellites in a constellation using a heterogeneous mix of sensor types and machine-learning-based target detection. Post described contributions including synthetic imagery generation, a schematic tip-and-cue communication protocol, a satellite imagery classifier with 92.1% test-set accuracy, and modeling of uncorrelated jitter impacts on classification performance. Later commercial and research sources described automated or AI-based tip-and-cue strategies for Earth observation and persistent monitoring.

A 2025 European Space Agency project described AI-based tip and cue in a canonical form involving a wide-field "tip" satellite that scans for anomalies and a higher-resolution, lower-swath "cue" satellite that follows up. The project aimed to simulate AI-based tip-and-cue missions while modeling off-nadir viewing effects, generating a whale-detection dataset, benchmarking AI detection performance, and evaluating satellite configurations and cueing delays.

== Applications ==
=== Space surveillance and defense ===
Defense-oriented sources discuss tip and cue as part of space-awareness and surveillance architectures rather than only as an Earth-observation workflow. Raytheon authors described sensor-to-sensor tip and cue among technologies for real-time space awareness, including status and warning for space assets and tracking of space ISR elements. DARPA described SST as developing and applying tactical sensor tip-and-cue techniques in the context of detecting and tracking faint objects in deep space. Richmond and Brennan described tip-and-cue points between collectors as part of satellite characterization using optical, radar, signal, and infrared phenomenologies.

=== Earth observation and AI ===
In Earth observation, tip and cue is described as a strategy for using complementary sensor systems to improve persistent monitoring over large areas. ICEYE described a demonstrated iceberg-monitoring process between Sentinel-1A and the ICEYE constellation, in which an iceberg imaged by Sentinel-1A in Extra-Wide swath mode was later monitored by ICEYE in Stripmap mode 12 hours and 38 minutes later. ICEYE stated that the higher-resolution follow-up imagery showed the larger iceberg, smaller icebergs, drift ice, and the iceberg's traversed path, helping analysts understand drift behavior and estimate velocity.

Dockstader described geospatial intelligence as being derived from imagery, information, and data associated with particular times and locations on Earth. The same white paper connected global-scale GEOINT collection to applications ranging from humanitarian aid and disaster relief to accurate maps and object databases. Duursma described AI-based tip and cue as a way to overcome trade-offs between spatial resolution, revisit time, and coverage in Earth-observation systems.

=== Search and rescue and disaster response ===
Post discussed search and rescue in the context of small-satellite tip-and-cue research, including high-resolution satellite imagery and crowdsourced labeling after the 2015 Nepal earthquake. Post also described the COSPAS-SARSAT satellite-aided tracking system, which uses satellites to receive and relay distress-beacon signals so rescue authorities can respond to beacon activation sites. In an emergency-weather example involving Hurricane Matthew, Post described selecting events of interest to optimize search-and-rescue response time and proposed using satellite imagery to direct first responders to precise locations.

=== Maritime domain awareness ===
In maritime surveillance, or maritime domain awareness (MDA), tip and cue systems have been proposed to monitor ship movements and identify vessels of interest across large ocean areas. Cudzilo, Foley, and Smith described a constellation using AIS satellites, a small SAR satellite, and a large electro-optical satellite to support maritime domain awareness. In that proposed architecture, AIS data would identify broadcasting vessels, SAR data would help locate non-broadcasting vessels, and the resulting locations would cue high-resolution electro-optical satellite collection.

Automatic Identification System (AIS) is one of the most important sources of data for MDA agencies. AIS is used so ships can know one another's whereabouts by transmitting signals from ship to ship and to shore. Ocean-going vessels and vessels larger than 300 tons are required by the International Maritime Organization to transmit AIS signals. Space-based AIS extends maritime monitoring beyond the approximate 50-nautical-mile line-of-sight range of shore-based and ship-borne receivers. The paper stated that exactAIS payloads were detecting and decoding more than one million AIS messages per day and that the system provided near real-time information on vessel identity, location, and movement for maritime authorities.

Cudzilo, Foley, and Smith described scenarios involving marine protected areas, environmental regulatory violations, piracy, illegal, unregulated, and unreported fishing, illicit trafficking, and humanitarian or disaster-relief efforts involving vessels. In a marine-protected-area scenario, AIS data would provide an early warning of a vessel approaching an area of interest, while SAR imagery would be used to detect vessels and identify their exact locations. In a hypothetical environmental-regulatory scenario, a SAR satellite cued after AIS detection would image a vessel and oil slick, with later electro-optical imaging used to validate model predictions and document response activities. The authors stated that fused reports combining AIS, SAR, electro-optical, and other data could assist watch floors or operations centers and shorten timelines for tactical responses.

== See also ==
- Sentient (intelligence analysis system) – U.S. government AI system
