= Chronology of the National Reconnaissance Office =

== Events ==
=== 1950-1959 ===
- 28 February 1959 - Discoverer 1 I/CORONA is launched; mission is a failure due to problems with Agena upper stage

=== 1960-1969 ===
- 15 January 1960 - 6594th Test Wing (Satellite) activated at Sunnyvale, California; will later be known as Air Force Satellite Control Facility, or the Blue Cube, controlling many NRO CORONA satellite missions
- 22 June 1960 - Launch of GRAB Signals Intelligence satellite; first overhead intelligence gathering satellite
- 11 August 1960 - Discoverer XIII capsule successfully recovered; first man-made object retrieved from orbit (American flag)
- 18 August 1960 - Discoverer XIV/CORONA M9009 launched; first totally successful mission; returned images of Mys Schmidta airfield
- 17 February 1961 - First launch of KH-5 ARGON camera system (M9014A); mission was partially successful
- 6 September 1961 - National Reconnaissance Office is established
- 13 December 1962 - First launch of POPPY SIGINT satellite
- 21 August 1964 - Last launch of KH-5 ARGON system (M9066A); mission was successful

=== 1970-1979 ===
- 25 May 1972 - CORONA M1117 launched; final mission of CORONA program
- 12 October 1973 - Existence of NRO is inadvertently leaked through the Congressional Record, an official government publication
- 15 August 1978 - William P. Kampiles, CIA staffer, arrested after selling KH-11 Technical Manual to the Soviets
- 1 October 1978 - President Jimmy Carter publicly acknowledges the "fact of" United States' photoreconnaissance satellites

=== 1980-1989 ===
- 28 January 1986 - STS-51L Challenger explodes; delays pending launches of NRO satellites

=== 1990-1999 ===
- 18 September 1992 - National Reconnaissance Office declassified

=== 2000-2009 ===
- 23 August 2001 - Brian Patrick Regan, a contractor at NRO, was arrested by FBI, under suspicion of espionage
- 23 April 2007 - Operating Division-4 (OD-4) inactivates at Onizuka AFS, California
