= Christopher Scolese =

American space agency executive (born 1956)

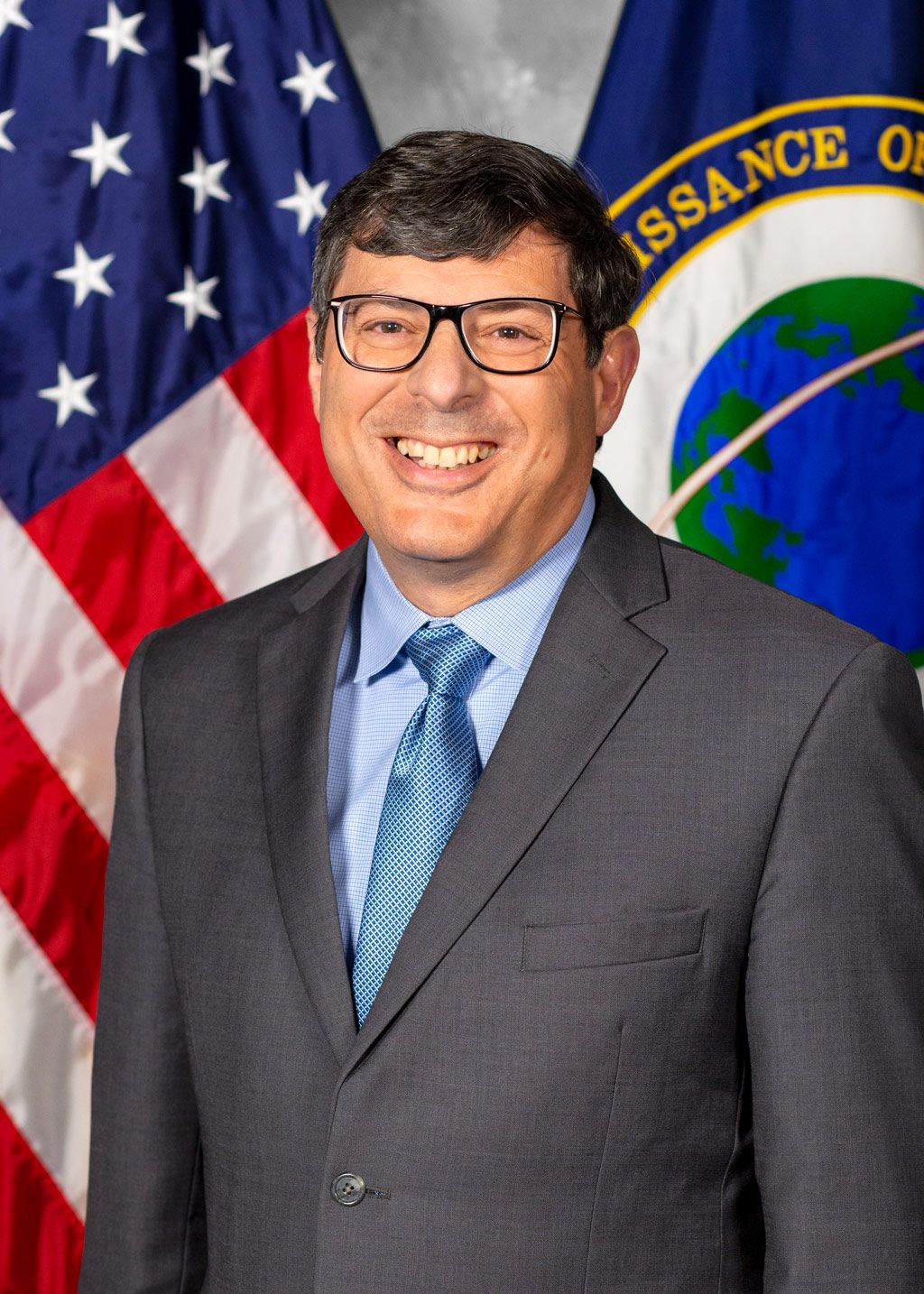

Director of the National Reconnaissance Office
- In office August 5, 2019 – July 10, 2026
- President: Donald Trump; Joe Biden; Donald Trump
- Preceded by: Betty J. Sapp
- Succeeded by: Roger Mason

Director of Goddard Space Flight Center
- In office March 5, 2012 – July 21, 2019
- President: Barack Obama; Donald Trump
- Preceded by: Rob Strain
- Succeeded by: Dennis Andrucyk

Acting Administrator of the National Aeronautics and Space Administration
- In office January 20, 2009 – July 17, 2009
- President: Barack Obama
- Deputy: Lori Garver
- Preceded by: Michael D. Griffin
- Succeeded by: Charles Bolden

Personal details
- Born: Christopher Jon Scolese; July 21, 1956 (age 70) Buffalo, New York, U.S.
- Education: University at Buffalo (BS); George Washington University (MS, PhD)
- Awards: NASA Distinguished Service Medal

Christopher J. Scolese is an American engineer and intelligence official who served as the director of the National Reconnaissance Office. He was appointed the 19th director of the National Reconnaissance Office (DNRO) on August 1, 2019. Scolese was sworn into office on August 5, 2019. He retired from public service on July 10, 2026.

== Education ==
Scolese holds a Bachelor of Sciences degree in electrical and computer engineering from the University at Buffalo (1978); a master's degree in electrical and computer engineering from George Washington University (1982); and a Ph.D. in systems engineering from George Washington University, Washington, D.C. (2016). He was awarded an honorary doctorate by the University at Buffalo in 2015.

== Career ==
Scolese began his government career as a United States Naval Officer in 1978, supporting a variety of Naval Nuclear Propulsion Programs for the U.S. Navy and the Department of Energy. He served on active duty until 1983, and then in the Navy Reserve until 1991, retiring as a lieutenant.

In 1987, following a brief period of service working in government and industry, Scolese joined NASA, where he was assigned to the Goddard Space Flight Center. During this period, he served in a variety of senior management positions including; Earth Observing System (EOS) systems manager, EOS Terra project manager, EOS program manager, and deputy director of Flight Programs and Projects for Earth Science.

In 2001, Scolese was assigned to NASA Headquarters in Washington, D.C. where he served as the deputy associate administrator in the Office of Space Science. In this position, he was responsible for the management, direction and oversight of NASA's Space Science Flight Program, mission studies, technology development and overall contract management of the Jet Propulsion Laboratory.

In 2004, Scolese went on to become the deputy director of the Goddard Space Flight Center, where he assisted the director in overseeing all activities, before returning to Washington, D.C. to become NASA's chief engineer in 2005. As chief engineer, he was responsible for ensuring all development and mission operations were planned and conducted on a sound engineering basis. In 2007, he was appointed the associate administrator, responsible for the oversight and integration of NASA's programmatic and technical efforts. And from January 20, 2009 to July 2009, Scolese served as NASA's acting administrator, responsible for leading the development, design and implementation of the nation's civil space program.

In 2012, NASA Administrator Charles Bolden selected Scolese to serve as the director of the Goddard Space Flight Center. In a 2017 interview, Bolden indicated this reflected his desire to move Scolese's "leadership and decision making responsibility for the James Webb Space Telescope to Goddard." At Goddard, Scolese led the nation's largest organization of scientists, engineers and technologists responsible for building spacecraft, instruments and new technology to study Earth, the Sun, the Solar System, and the universe. On July 31, 2019, he retired from NASA to become director of the National Reconnaissance Office.

In July 2026, Scolese received the Department of Defense Medal for Distinguished Public Service for his tenure as director of the National Reconnaissance Office.
