= Bruce A. Carlson =

United States Air Force general (born 1949)

Bruce Allen Carlson
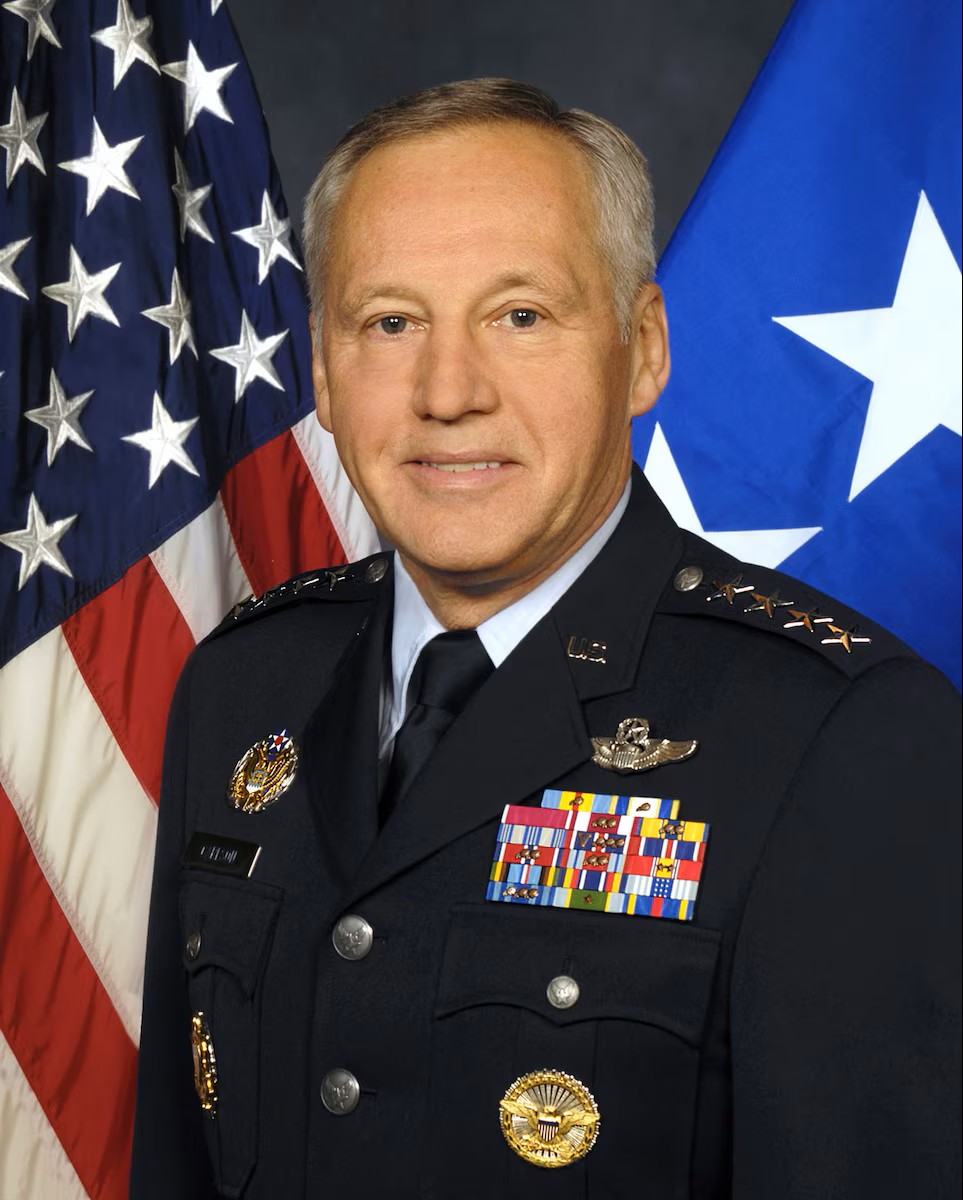

17th Director of the National Reconnaissance Office
- In office June 12, 2009 – July 20, 2012
- President: Barack Obama
- Preceded by: Scott F. Large
- Succeeded by: Betty J. Sapp

Personal details
- Born: October 3, 1949 (age 76) Hibbing, Minnesota, U.S.
- Awards: Legion of Merit; Air Force Commendation Medal; Air Force Achievement Medal

Military service
- Branch/service: United States Air Force
- Years of service: 1971–2009
- Rank: General
- Commands: Air Force Materiel Command; 8th Air Force; 49th Fighter Wing

Bruce Allen Carlson (born October 3, 1949), was the 17th Director of the National Reconnaissance Office (NRO). He is a former four-star general in the United States Air Force and served as the sixth Commander, Air Force Materiel Command, Wright-Patterson Air Force Base, Ohio. The command conducts research, development, test and evaluation, and provides acquisition management services and logistics support necessary to keep Air Force weapon systems ready for war. After over 37 years of service, he retired from the Air Force on January 1, 2009. Carlson served as a general authority and a member of the Second Quorum of the Seventy of the Church of Jesus Christ of Latter-day Saints (LDS Church) from April 2009 to October 2015.

== Biography ==
Carlson was born in Hibbing, Minnesota, in 1949. He was commissioned in 1971 after completing the University of Minnesota Duluth's Air Force ROTC program as a distinguished graduate. He has held various assignments in flying units. Staff assignments have included positions at Tactical Air Command, Headquarters U.S. Air Force, the offices of the Secretary of the Air Force and Secretary of Defense, and as the director of force structure, resources and assessment with the Joint Staff. Additionally, he commanded the Air Force's 49th Fighter Wing at Holloman AFB, New Mexico Prior to assuming his current position, Carlson served as the Commander, 8th Air Force, Barksdale AFB, Louisiana, and Joint Functional Component Commander for Space and Global Strike, U.S. Strategic Command, Offutt AFB, Nebraska

Carlson is experienced in multiple aircraft weapons systems, is a command pilot with more than 3,000 flying hours, and has combat experience in the OV-10.

In April 2009, Carlson was called as a general authority and a member of the LDS Church's Second Quorum of the Seventy.

In June 2009, he was appointed by President Barack Obama as director of the NRO, an agency that operates the nation's reconnaissance satellites.

On April 18, 2012, Carlson announced his resignation as director of the NRO, effective July 20, 2012. As of 2020, Carlson is on the boards of Lockheed Martin and Benchmark Electronics.

== LDS Church service ==
Prior to his call as a general authority in April 2009, Carlson served in the church as an elders quorum president, young men president, bishop, high councilor, and an adviser to the church's Military Advisory Committee.

Carlson served as one of two area supervisors of the church's Middle East/Africa North Area from 2012 to 2015. Carlson also served as an Assistant Executive Director of the church's Temple Department. During the church's October 2015 general conference, Carlson was released from the seventy and designated an emeritus general authority.

== Education ==
- 1971 Bachelor of Arts degree, University of Minnesota Duluth
- 1979 U.S. Air Force Fighter Weapons School, Nellis AFB, Nevada
- 1980 Master of Arts degree, Webster University, St. Louis, Missouri
- 1989 Distinguished graduate, Master of Arts degree, Naval War College, Newport, Rhode Island

== Assignments ==
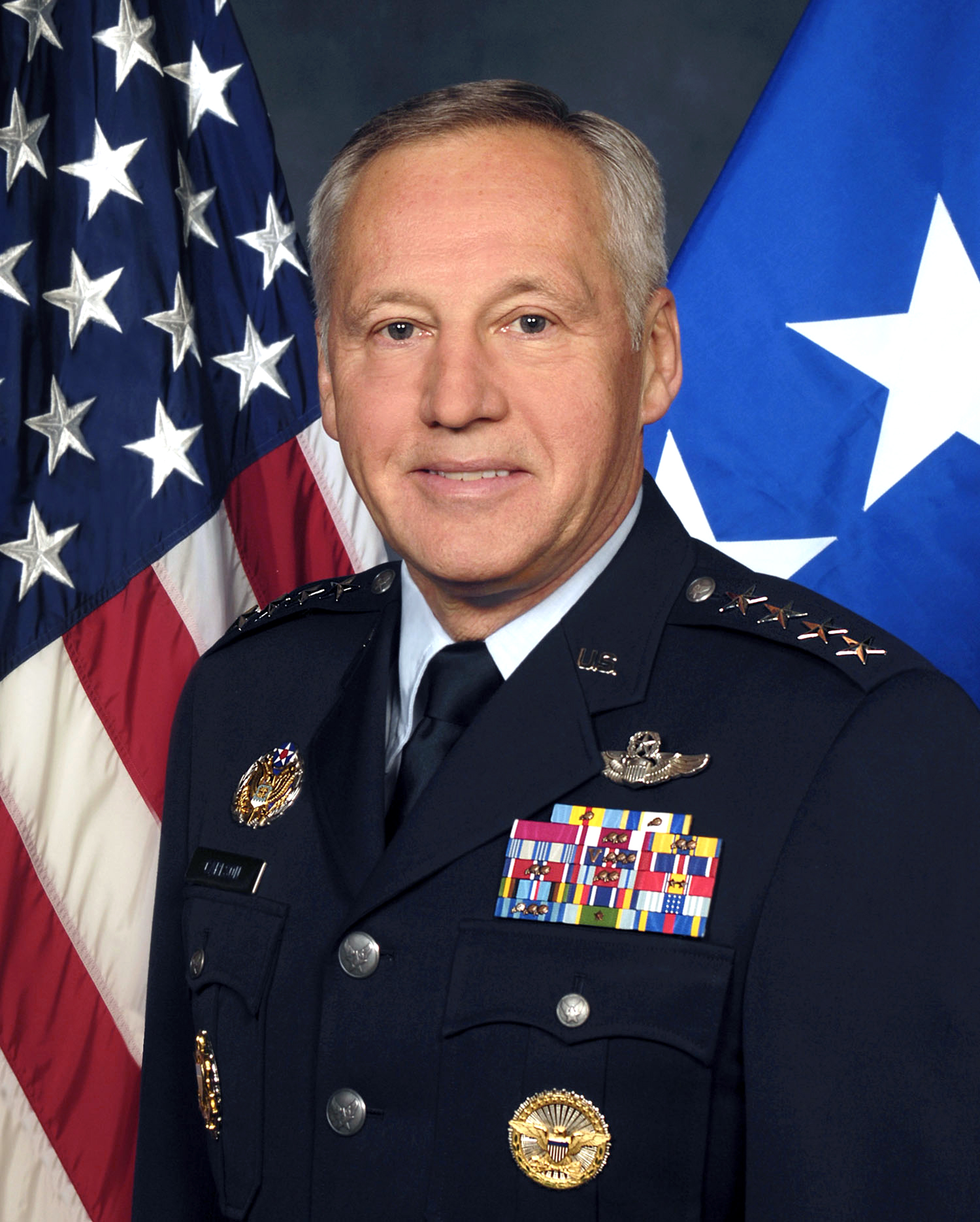
General Bruce A. Carlson, USAF Commander, Air Force Materiel Command

- June 1971 – May 1972, student, undergraduate pilot training, Vance AFB, Oklahoma
- June 1972 – April 1973, student, F-4 Replacement Training Unit, Homestead AFB, Florida
- May 1973 – December 1974, F-4 pilot, 417th Tactical Fighter Squadron, Holloman AFB, New Mexico
- December 1974 – October 1975, OV-10 forward air controller and instructor pilot, 23rd Tactical Air Support Squadron, Nakhon Phanom Royal Thai Air Force Base, Thailand
- October 1975 – November 1977, OV-10 instructor pilot and flight examiner, 23rd Tactical Air Support Squadron, Bergstrom AFB, Texas
- December 1977 – April 1980, A-10 pilot and fighter weapons instructor pilot, 355th Tactical Fighter Squadron, Myrtle Beach AFB, South Carolina
- May 1980 – September 1982, aide to the commander of Headquarters Tactical Air Command, Langley AFB, Virginia
- October 1982 – June 1985, wing weapons officer, 363rd Tactical Fighter Wing, and operations officer, 17th Tactical Fighter Squadron, Shaw AFB, South Carolina
- July 1985 – June 1988, tactical systems requirements officer, Office of Low Observables Technology, Office of the Secretary of the Air Force, Washington, D.C.
- July 1988 – June 1989, graduate student, Naval War College, Newport, R.I.
- July 1989 – June 1991, director of advanced programs, Headquarters TAC, Langley AFB, Virginia
- July 1991 – June 1993, vice commander, 366th Wing, Mountain Home AFB, Idaho
- July 1993 – February 1995, senior military assistant to the Undersecretary of Defense for Acquisition, and senior military assistant to the Deputy Secretary of Defense, Office of the Secretary of Defense, Washington, D.C.
- February 1995 – November 1996, commander of 49th Fighter Wing, Holloman AFB, New Mexico
- November 1996 – June 1998, director of global power programs, Office of the Assistant Secretary of the Air Force for Acquisition, Headquarters U.S. Air Force, Washington, D.C.
- June 1998 – December 1999, director of operational requirements, Deputy Chief of Staff for Air and Space Operations, Headquarters U.S. Air Force, Washington, D.C.
- January 2000 – May 2002, director for force structure, resources and assessment (J-8), the Joint Staff, Washington, D.C.
- May 2002 – April 2005, commander of 8th Air Force, Barksdale AFB, Louisiana
- April 2005 – August 2005, commander of 8th Air Force, Barksdale AFB, Louisiana, and joint functional component commander for space and global strike, U.S. Strategic Command, Offutt AFB, Nebraska
- August 2005 – January 2009, commander of Air Force Materiel Command, Wright-Patterson AFMC, Ohio

== Flight information ==
- Rating: Command pilot
- Flight hours: More than 3,000
- Aircraft flown: F-4, OV-10, A-10, F-16, F-111, EF-111, AT-38, F-117 and B-52

== Awards and decorations ==
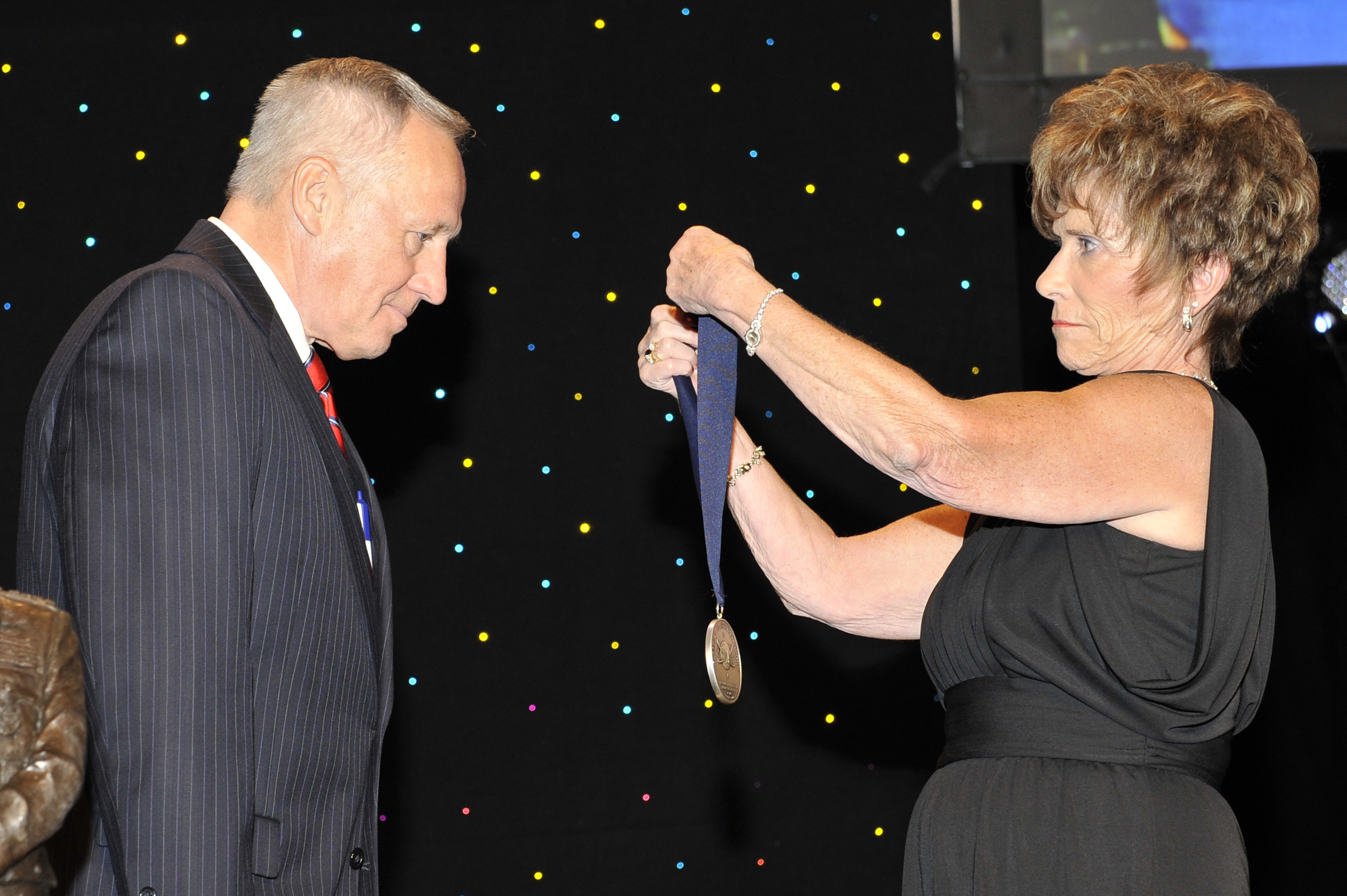
Carlson receiving the Hartinger award in 2012

| Command Air Force Pilot Badge |
| Office of the Secretary of Defense Identification Badge |
| Office of the Joint Chiefs of Staff Identification Badge |
| Headquarters Air Force Badge |

| Defense Distinguished Service Medal with oak leaf cluster |
| Air Force Distinguished Service Medal with two leaf clusters |
| Legion of Merit |
| Meritorious Service Medal with two oak leaf clusters |
| Air Force Commendation Medal with two oak leaf clusters |
| Air Force Achievement Medal |
| Air Force Outstanding Unit Award with Valor device and three oak leaf clusters |
| Air Force Outstanding Unit Award (second ribbon to denote fifth award) |
| Air Force Organizational Excellence Award with two oak leaf clusters |
| Combat Readiness Medal with two oak leaf clusters |
| National Defense Service Medal with two bronze service stars |
| Armed Forces Expeditionary Medal |
| Global War on Terrorism Service Medal |
| Air Force Overseas Short Tour Service Ribbon |
| Air Force Longevity Service Award with one silver and three bronze oak leaf clusters |
| Small Arms Expert Marksmanship Ribbon with service star |
| Air Force Training Ribbon |
| James V. Hartinger Award |

== Promotion dates ==
- Second lieutenant: June 12, 1971
- First lieutenant: December 12, 1972
- Captain: June 12, 1975
- Major: November 1, 1982
- Lieutenant colonel: March 1, 1985
- Colonel: February 1, 1991
- Brigadier general: January 1, 1996
- Major general: September 1, 1998
- Lieutenant general: February 1, 2000
- General: September 1, 2005
