= Betty J. Sapp =

Director of the National Reconnaissance Office

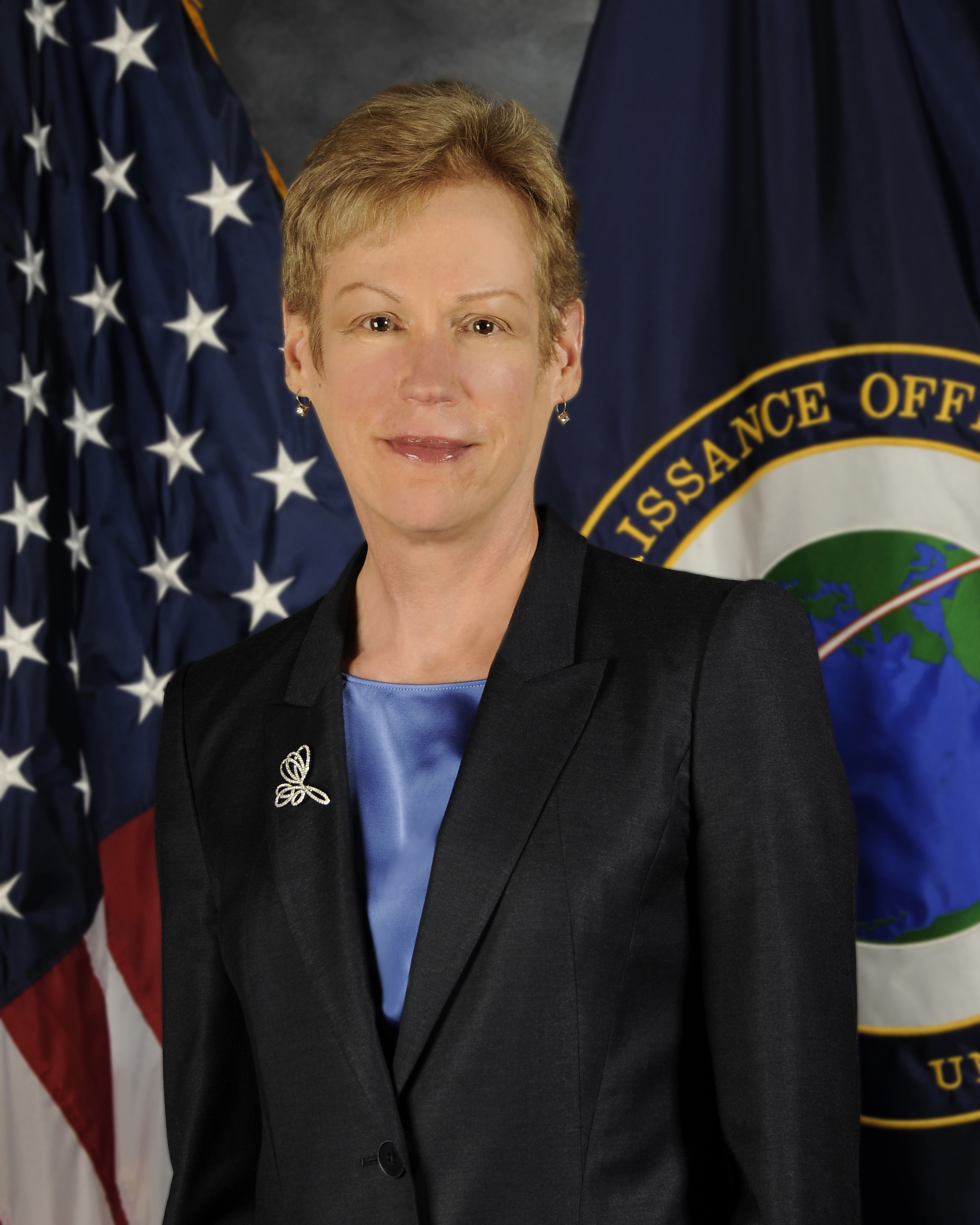

18th Director of the National Reconnaissance Office
- In office July 20, 2012 – April 4, 2019
- President: Barack Obama; Donald Trump
- Preceded by: Bruce A. Carlson
- Succeeded by: Christopher Scolese

Personal details
- Born: 1955 (age 70–71) St. Louis, Missouri, U.S.
- Profession: Civil service

Betty Jean Sapp (born 1955) is the former Director of the National Reconnaissance Office (DNRO). She served as a United States Air Force Officer in a variety of roles, before joining the Central Intelligence Agency in 1997. She was the first female Director of the NRO, serving nearly seven years.

== Early life ==
Sapp is a native of St. Louis, Missouri, and now resides in Alexandria, Virginia. She holds a Bachelor of Arts, and an M.B.A. in Management, both from the University of Missouri. She is also Level III certified in Government Acquisition and was certified as a Defense Financial Manager.

== Career ==
She began her government career as a United States Air Force officer in a variety of acquisition and financial management positions, including: business management positions in the NRO; as a Program Element Monitor at the Pentagon for the Milstar system; as Program Manager for the Fleet Satellite Communications System program at the Space and Missile Systems Center in Los Angeles, California; and as manager of a joint-service development effort for the A-10 engine at Wright-Patterson Air Force Base in Dayton, Ohio.

In 1997, she joined the Central Intelligence Agency. She was assigned to the NRO where she served in a variety of senior management positions. In 2005, she was appointed the Deputy Director, Business Plans and Operations, where she was responsible for all NRO business functions, including budget planning, current year financial operations, contracting, financial statements, business systems development, cost estimating, and legislative affairs.

In May 2007, Sapp was appointed Deputy Under Secretary of Defense for Portfolio, Programs and Resources in the Office of the Under Secretary of Defense for Intelligence, responsible for executive oversight of defense intelligence-related acquisition programs, the planning, programming, budgeting and execution of the Military Intelligence Program.

She was appointed the Principal Deputy Director, National Reconnaissance Office (PDDNRO) on April 15, 2009. In July 2012, she was appointed Director of the NRO, becoming the first woman to hold that position. She left the agency in April 2019. As of May 29, 2019, she was named as a member of the BALL board of directors.

== See also ==
- Leadership of the National Reconnaissance Office
