= USA-202 =

American spacecraft

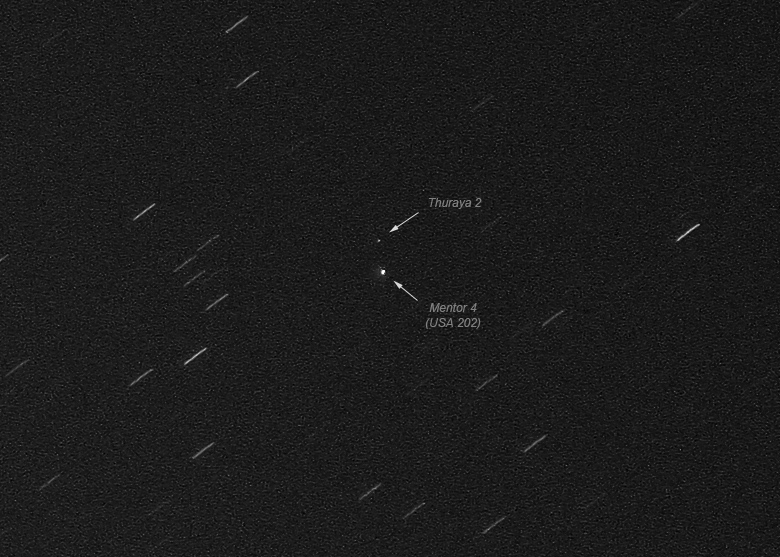
- USA 202 and Thuraya 2, photographed on 8 December 2010 from the Netherlands
- Mission type: ELINT
- Operator: NRO
- COSPAR ID: 2009-001A
- SATCAT no.: 33490

Spacecraft properties
- Spacecraft type: Orion

Start of mission
- Launch date: 18 January 2009, 02:47 UTC
- Rocket: Delta IV Heavy
- Launch site: Cape Canaveral SLC-37B
- Contractor: United Launch Alliance

Orbital parameters
- Reference system: Geocentric
- Regime: Geosynchronous
- Longitude: 44° east
- Perigee altitude: 35,777 kilometers (22,231 mi)
- Apogee altitude: 35,809 kilometers (22,251 mi)
- Inclination: 3.69 degrees
- Period: 23.93 hours
- Epoch: 1 January 2014, 15:43:08 UTC
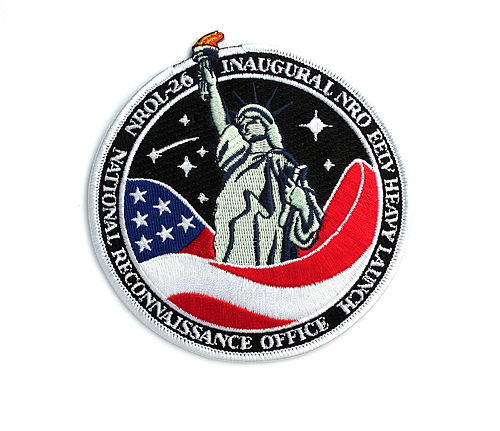

USA 202, previously NRO Launch 26 or NROL-26, is a classified spacecraft which is operated by the United States National Reconnaissance Office. It is an Advanced Orion ELINT satellite. According to Aviation Week, it "fundamentally involves America's biggest, most secret and expensive military spacecraft on board the world's largest rocket." The combined cost of the spacecraft and launch vehicle has been estimated to be over US$2 billion.

Amateur astronomer observations suspected the satellite was eavesdropping on Thuraya 2 and this was reported to be confirmed by documents released on Sep 9, 2016 by The Intercept as part of the Snowden Files.

== Launch ==
USA-202 was launched from Space Launch Complex 37B at the Cape Canaveral Air Force Station, on the third flight of a Delta IV Heavy rocket. The launch was originally scheduled for 2005, but was delayed due to a number of issues, and lift-off took place at 02:47 GMT on 18 January 2009.
