= Magnum (satellite) =

Class of spy satellites of the United States Central Intelligence Agency

Magnum was a class of SIGINT spy satellites reportedly operated by the National Reconnaissance Office (NRO) for the United States Central Intelligence Agency (CIA). The program remains classified, and the information that exists is speculative.

== Launch ==
It is believed that two Magnum satellites were launched from Space Shuttle Discovery (OV-103) during the missions STS-51-C in 1985 and STS-33 in 1989. The satellites reportedly have a mass of 2,200–2,700 kg (4,900–6,000 lb), operating in near-geosynchronous orbits, using Inertial Upper Stages (IUS) to get from the shuttle's orbit to the higher geosynchronous orbit. According to Jim Slade of ABC News, the second satellite, USA-48, replaced the first, USA-8, which after more than four years in orbit was running out of maneuvering fuel required for keeping its station over the Indian Ocean. The mission of the two satellites was to listen in to military and diplomatic communications from the Soviet Union, China, and neighboring countries.

== USA-67 satellite ==
USA-67, launched aboard Space Shuttle Atlantis (OV-104) in November 1990 (STS-38 mission), was initially identified as a third Magnum satellite owing to the presence of two upper stages in orbit after its deployment, suggesting that an Inertial Upper Stage (IUS) had been used to deploy it. It was later determined that the second upper stage was from the stealthy Prowler spacecraft, and that USA-67 was a Satellite Data System (SDS-2) communications satellite.

== Contractor ==
The Magnum satellites, built by TRW, are rumored to have large (estimated 100 m (330 ft) diameter) umbrella-like reflecting dishes to collect RF signals from Earth. The Magnum/Orion satellites replaced the older Rhyolite/Aquacade series of SIGINT satellites, and have themselves been succeeded by the Mentor/Advanced Orion satellites.

== Satellites ==
Name	COSPAR ID	Launch date (UTC)	Launch vehicle	Launch site	Longitude	Remarks
USA-8	1985-010B	24 January 1985; 19:50:00	Space Shuttle Discovery; STS-51-C / IUS	KSC, LC-39A		
USA-48	1989-090B	23 November 1989; 00:23:00	Space Shuttle Discovery; STS-33 / IUS	KSC, LC-39B		

== See also ==
- Orion
