= STS-61-F =

Cancelled 1986 Space Shuttle mission

- Names: Space Transportation System
- Mission type: Ulysses spacecraft deployment
- Operator: NASA
- Mission duration: 4 days, 1 hour, 11 minutes (planned)

Spacecraft properties
- Spacecraft: Space Shuttle Challenger (planned)
- Launch mass: 117,749 kg (259,592 lb)
- Landing mass: 89,298 kg (196,868 lb)
- Payload mass: 15,362 kg (33,867 lb)

Crew
- Crew size: 4 (planned)
- Members: Frederick H. Hauck; Roy D. Bridges Jr. John M. Lounge; David C. Hilmers

Start of mission
- Launch date: 15 May 1986, 20:10:00 UTC (planned)
- Rocket: Space Shuttle Challenger
- Launch site: Kennedy Space Center, LC-39B
- Contractor: Rockwell International

End of mission
- Landing date: 19 May 1986, 21:21:00 UTC (planned)
- Landing site: Kennedy Space Center, SLF Runway 15

Orbital parameters
- Reference system: Geocentric orbit (planned)
- Regime: Low Earth orbit
- Perigee altitude: 300 km (190 mi)
- Apogee altitude: 307 km (191 mi)
- Inclination: 28.45°
- Period: 90.60 minutes
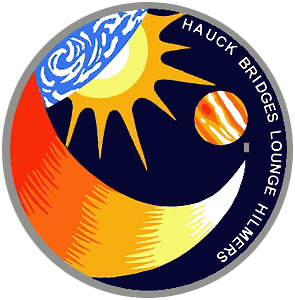
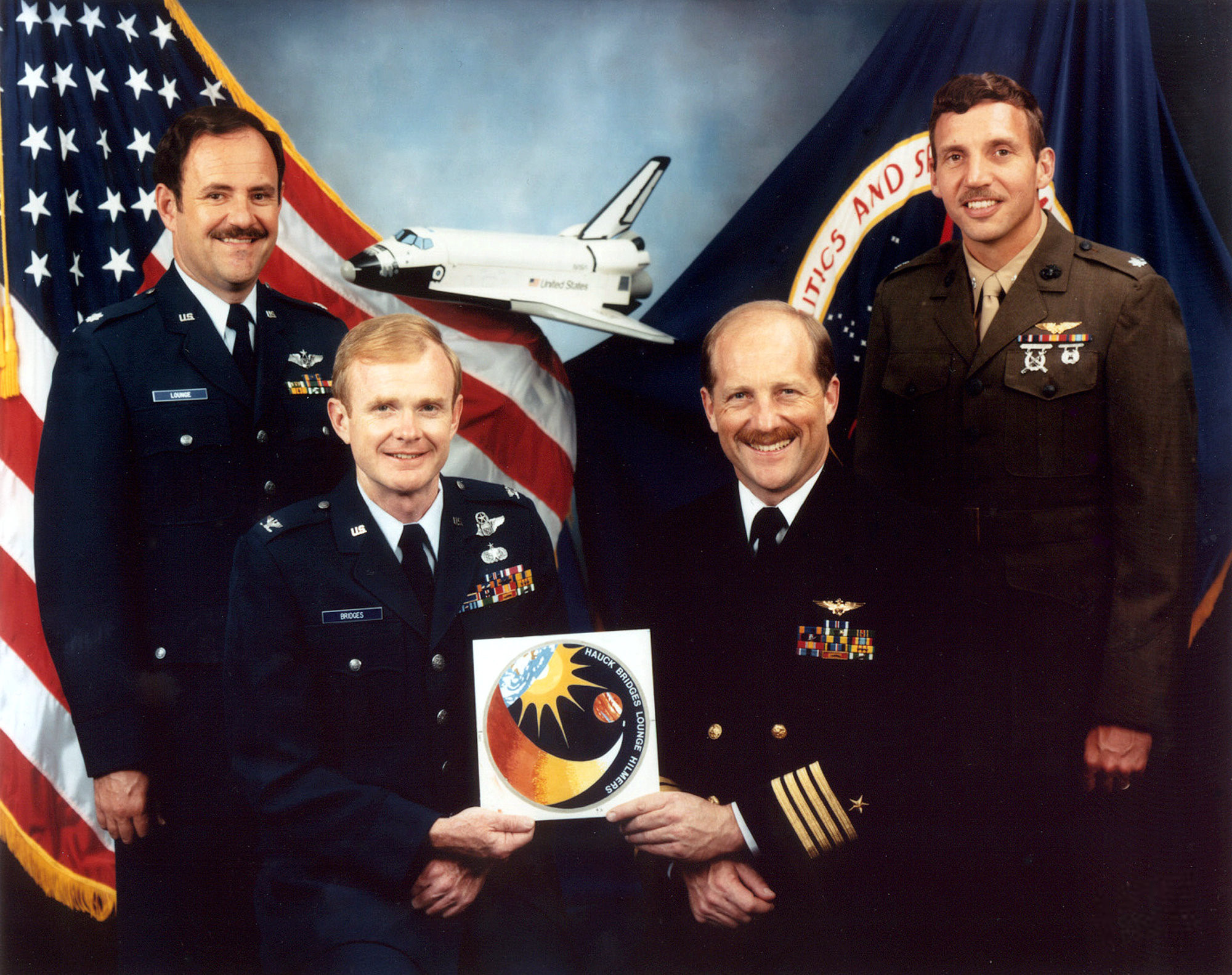
- STS-61-F mission patch John M. Lounge, Roy D. Bridges Jr., Frederick H. Hauck, David C. Hilmers Space Shuttle program Cancelled Shuttle missions

STS-61-F was a NASA Space Shuttle mission planned to launch on 15 May 1986 using Challenger. It was canceled after Challenger was destroyed earlier that year.

== Crew ==
Position	Astronaut
Commander	Frederick H. Hauck; Would have been third space mission
Pilot	Roy D. Bridges Jr. Would have been second space mission
Mission Specialist 1	John M. Lounge; Would have been second space mission
Mission Specialist 2	David C. Hilmers; Would have been second space mission

== Mission objectives ==
The main objective of STS-61-F was to deploy the Ulysses solar probe, which would travel to Jupiter and use it as a gravitational slingshot in order to be placed into polar orbit around the Sun. This mission would have marked the first use of the Centaur-G liquid-fueled payload booster, which would also be used on the subsequent mission to send the Galileo probe in orbit around Jupiter.

Due to the use of the Centaur-G and its volatile propellants, this mission was considered to be one of the most dangerous Space Shuttle flights attempted, with the Chief of the Astronaut Office John W. Young referring to the two Centaur flights as the "Death Star" flights. The flight was risky enough that Commander Hauck gave his crewmates an option to leave the crew if they considered the mission to be too unsafe.

After the loss of Challenger, most of the crew (without Roy D. Bridges Jr., who left NASA in 1986) would fly as the crew of the first post-Challenger mission, STS-26, later flown by Discovery. Bridges was replaced by Richard O. Covey and a third Mission Specialist (George D. "Pinky" Nelson) was added to the crew. Ulysses was eventually deployed from Discovery on STS-41, using the solid-fueled Inertial Upper Stage (IUS) and Payload Assist Module (PAM-S) instead of the Centaur-G, which had been canceled after the Challenger disaster.

== See also ==
- Canceled Space Shuttle missions
- STS-26
- STS-41
