= NASA Astronaut Group 9 =

1980 human spaceflight selection of 19 candidates; "The 19+80"

19+80
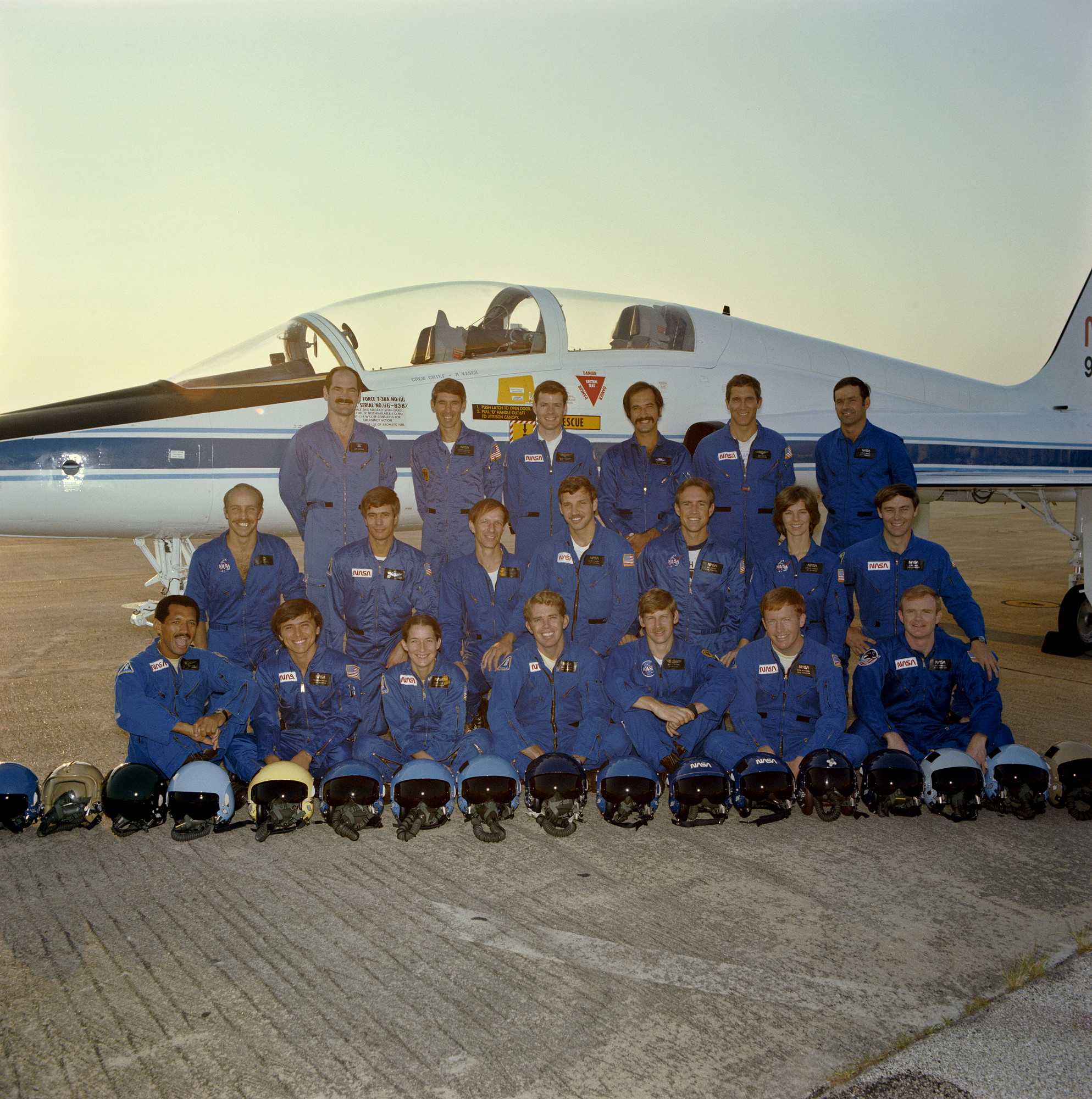
- Group 9 astronauts. Back row, L-R: Gardner, Springer, O'Connor, Ockels, Smith, Lounge. Middle row, L-R: Bagian, Blaha, Nicollier, Hilmers, Fisher, Dunbar, Ross. Front row, L-R: Bolden, Chang-Diaz, Cleave, Leestma, Spring, Richards, Bridges
- Year selected: 1980
- Number selected: 19

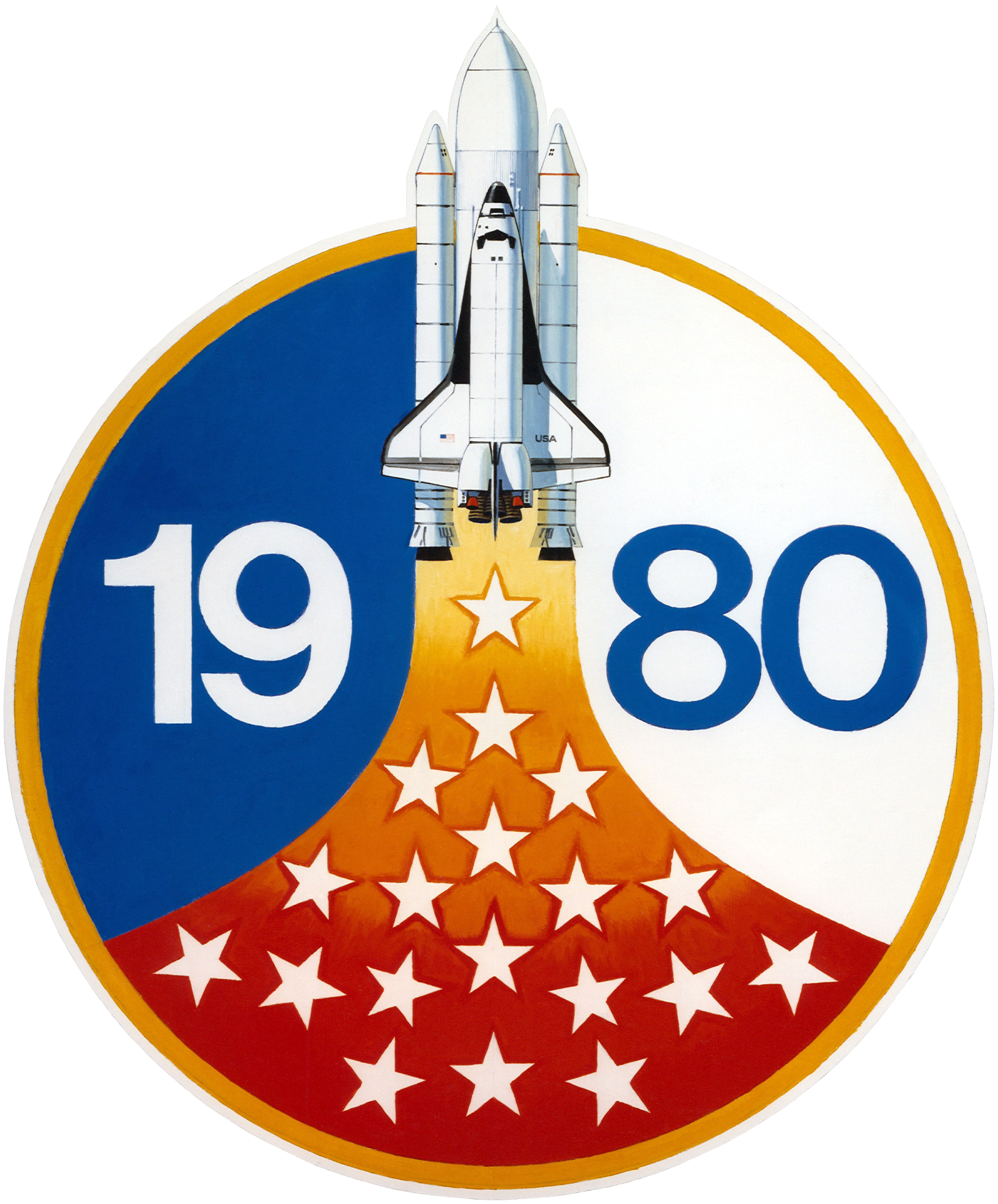
Class patch; the patch features nineteen stars representing the nineteen NASA astronauts belonging to the group.

NASA Astronaut Group 9 (nicknamed "The 19+80") was a group of 19 NASA astronauts announced on May 29, 1980, and completed their training by 1981. This group was selected to supplement the 35 astronauts that had been selected in 1978, and marked the first time that non-Americans were trained as mission specialists with the selections of ESA astronauts Claude Nicollier and Wubbo Ockels. In keeping with the previous group, astronaut candidates were divided into pilots and mission specialists, with eight pilots, eleven mission specialists, and two international mission specialists within the group.

== Achievements ==
As with the previous group, several spaceflight firsts were achieved, including:

- First Costa Rican astronaut: Franklin Chang-Diaz (January 12, 1986, STS-61-C)
- First Dutch citizen in space: Wubbo Ockels (October 30, 1985, STS-61-A)
- First Swiss astronaut: Claude Nicollier (July 31, 1992, STS-46)
- First African-American Marine in space: Charles Bolden (January 12, 1986, STS-61-C)
- First person to be launched into space more than six times: Jerry Ross (April 8, 2002, STS-110)
- First astronaut spouse selected as an astronaut: William Fisher (August 27, 1985, STS-51-I; married to Anna Fisher, Group 8 astronaut)

In addition, Chang-Diaz and Ross share the world record for the most spaceflights, with seven each. Bolden also became the second astronaut to serve as NASA Administrator, appointed in July 2009.

== Group members ==
=== Pilots ===
- John E. Blaha (born 1942), U.S. Air Force (5 flights)

STS-29 Discovery — March 1989 — Pilot — Deployed TDRS-D
STS-33 Discovery — November 1989 — Pilot — Was a classified United States Department of Defense mission
STS-43 Atlantis — August 1991 — Commander — Deployed TDRS-E
STS-58 Columbia — October 1993 — Commander — Spacelab: SLS-2
STS-79 Atlantis — September 1996 — Mission Specialist 4 — Launched for long duration flight aboard Mir
Mir EO-22: Board Engineer 2
STS-81 Atlantis — January 1997 — Mission Specialist 4 — Landed from long duration flight aboard Mir

- Charles F. Bolden, Jr. (born 1946), U.S. Marine Corps (4 flights) - Former NASA Administrator

STS-61-C Columbia — January 1986 — Pilot — Deployed Ku-1 communications satellite
STS-31 Discovery — April 1990 — Pilot — Deployed the Hubble Space Telescope
STS-45 Atlantis — March 1992 — Commander — ATLAS-1
STS-60 Discovery — February 1994 — Commander — Spacehab 2

- Roy D. Bridges, Jr. (born 1943), U.S. Air Force (1 flight)

STS-51-F Challenger — July 1985 — Pilot — Spacelab 2

- Guy S. Gardner (born 1948), U.S. Air Force (2 flights)

STS-27 Atlantis — December 1988 — Pilot — Was a classified United States Department of Defense mission
STS-35 Columbia — December 1990 — Pilot — ASTRO-1

- Ronald J. Grabe (born 1945), U.S. Air Force (4 flights)

STS-51-J Atlantis — October 1985 — Pilot — Was a classified United States Department of Defense mission
STS-30 Atlantis — May 1989 — Pilot — Deployed the Magellan probe
STS-42 Discovery — January 1992 — Commander — Spacelab: IML-1
STS-57 Endeavour — June 1993 — Commander — Spacehab

- Bryan D. O'Connor (born 1946), U.S. Marine Corps (2 flights) - Former NASA Chief of Safety and Mission Assurance

STS-61-B Atlantis — November 1985 — Pilot — Deployed 3 communication satellites
STS-40 Columbia — June 1991 — Commander — Spacelab: SLS-1

- Richard N. Richards (born 1946), U.S. Navy (4 flights)

STS-28 Columbia — August 1989 — Pilot — Was a classified United States Department of Defense mission
STS-41 Discovery — October 1990 — Commander — Deployed the Ulysses (spacecraft)
STS-50 Columbia — June 1992 — Commander — Spacelab: U.S. Microgravity Laboratory 1
STS-64 Discovery — September 1994 — Commander — Lidar In-space Technology Experiment (LITE)

- Michael J. Smith (1945–1986), U.S. Navy (1 planned flight) - Died During the Challenger Disaster

STS-51-L Challenger — January 1986 — Pilot — Planned to Deploy TDRS-B

=== Mission Specialists ===
- James P. Bagian (born 1952), U.S. Air Force (2 flights)

STS-29 Discovery — March 1989 — Mission Specialist 1 — Deployed TDRS-D
STS-40 Columbia — June 1991 — Mission Specialist 1 — Spacelab: SLS-1

- Franklin Chang-Diaz (born 1950), Physicist (7 flights)

STS-61-C Columbia — January 1986 — Mission Specialist 1 — Deployed Ku-1 communications satellite
STS-34 Atlantis — October 1989 — Mission Specialist 1 — Deployed the Galileo probe
STS-46 Atlantis — July 1992 — Mission Specialist 2 — Deployed ESA's European Retrievable Carrier and flew the Tethered Satellite System's TSS-1 mission
STS-60 Discovery — February 1994 — Mission Specialist 3 — Spacehab 2
STS-75 Columbia — February 1996 — Mission Specialist 4/Payload Commander — The Tethered Satellite System's TSS-1R mission
STS-91 Discovery — June 1998 — Mission Specialist 2 — Final Shuttle/Mir mission
STS-111 Endeavour — June 2002 — Mission Specialist 1 — Installed the Mobile Base System for Canadarm2 on the ISS

- Mary L. Cleave (1947-2023), Engineer (2 flights)

STS-61-B Atlantis — November 1985 — Mission Specialist 1 — Deployed 3 communication satellites
STS-30 Atlantis — May 1989 — Mission Specialist 2 — Deployed the Magellan probe

- Bonnie J. Dunbar (born 1949), Scientist (5 flights)

STS-61-A Challenger — October 1985 — Mission Specialist 1 — Spacelab D1
STS-32 Columbia — January 1990 — Mission Specialist 1 — Deployed the SYNCOM IV-F5 satellite; retrieved the Long Duration Exposure Facility
STS-50 Columbia — June 1992 — Mission Specialist 1 — Spacelab: U.S. Microgravity Laboratory 1
STS-71 Atlantis — June 1995 — Mission Specialist 3 — First Shuttle/Mir docking
STS-89 Endeavour — January 1998 — Mission Specialist 3 — Eighth Shuttle/Mir docking

- William Frederick Fisher (born 1946), Physician (1 flight)

STS-51-I Discovery — August 1985 — Mission Specialist 3 — Deployed three communications satellites

- David C. Hilmers (born 1950), Engineer (4 flights)

STS-51-J Atlantis — October 1985 — Mission Specialist 1 — Was a classified United States Department of Defense mission
STS-26 Discovery — September 1988 — Mission Specialist 3 — Was the "Return-to-Flight" shuttle mission following the Challenger disaster; deployed TDRS-C
STS-36 Atlantis — February 1990 — Mission Specialist 2 — Was a classified United States Department of Defense mission
STS-42 Discovery — January 1992 — Mission Specialist 2 — Spacelab: IML-1

- David Leestma (born 1949), U.S. Navy (3 flights) - Former NASA Manager of JSC's Advanced Planning Office

STS-41-G Challenger — October 1984 — Mission Specialist 3 — Deployed the Earth Radiation Budget Satellite
STS-28 Columbia — August 1989 — Mission Specialist 2 — Was a classified United States Department of Defense mission
STS-45 Atlantis — March 1992 — Mission Specialist 2 — ATLAS-1

- John M. Lounge (1946–2011), U.S. Navy (3 flights)

STS-51-I Discovery — August 1985 — Mission Specialist 2 — Deployed three communications satellites
STS-26 Discovery — September 1988 — Mission Specialist 1 — Was the "Return-to-Flight" shuttle mission following the Challenger disaster; deployed TDRS-C
STS-35 Columbia — December 1990 — Mission Specialist 2 — ASTRO-1

- Jerry L. Ross (born 1948), U.S. Air Force (7 flights) - Currently NASA Chief of JSC's Vehicle Integration Test Office

STS-61-B Atlantis — November 1985 — Mission Specialist 2 — Deployed 3 communication satellites
STS-27 Atlantis — December 1988 — Mission Specialist 2 — Was a classified United States Department of Defense mission
STS-37 Atlantis — April 1991 — Mission Specialist 1 — Launched the Compton Gamma Ray Observatory
STS-55 Columbia — April 1993 — Mission Specialist 1 — Spacelab: D2
STS-74 Atlantis — November 1995 — Mission Specialist 2 — Second Shuttle/Mir docking
STS-88 Endeavour — December 1998 — Mission Specialist 1 — First shuttle mission to the International Space Station; delivered Unity (Node 1) and the first two Pressurized Mating Adapters
STS-110 Atlantis — April 2002 — Mission Specialist 1 — Delivered the S0 Truss and the Mobile Transporter for Canadarm2

- Sherwood C. Spring (born 1944), U.S. Army (1 flight)

STS-61-B Atlantis — November 1985 — Mission Specialist 3 — Deployed 3 communication satellites

- Robert C. Springer (born 1942), U.S. Marine Corps (2 flights)

STS-29 Discovery — March 1989 — Mission Specialist 3 — Deployed TDRS-D
STS-38 Atlantis — November 1990 — Mission Specialist 1 — Was a classified United States Department of Defense mission

=== International Mission Specialists ===
- Claude Nicollier (born 1944), Swiss Air Force (4 flights)

STS-46 Atlantis — July 1992 — Mission Specialist 3 — Deployed ESA's European Retrievable Carrier and flew the Tethered Satellite System's TSS-1 mission
STS-61 Endeavour — December 1993 — Mission Specialist 3 — Hubble Space Telescope Servicing Mission 1
STS-75 Columbia — February 1996 — Mission Specialist 3 — The Tethered Satellite System's TSS-1R mission
STS-103 Discovery — December 1999 — Mission Specialist 5 — Hubble Space Telescope Servicing Mission 3A

- Wubbo Ockels (1946–2014), Physicist (1 flight)

STS-61-A Challenger — October 1985 — Payload Specialist 3 — Spacelab: D1

Delays in Spacelab caused NASA to offer ESA payload specialists the opportunity to train with its full-time astronauts; Nicollier and Ockels were the first non-Americans to do so. Ulf Merbold would also have trained as a mission specialist but could not pass the medical examination, an example of the lower physical standards for payload specialists. ESA believed that Spacelab was more important than mission specialist training. In September 1981 Ockels withdrew from training to focus on Spacelab; Nicollier continued and until 2005 was a NASA mission specialist.

== See also ==
- Astronaut
- List of astronauts by name
- List of astronauts by selection
- List of space travelers by name
- List of space travelers by nationality
- NASA Astronaut Groups
