= John M. Lounge =

American astronaut and engineer (1946–2011)

Mike Lounge
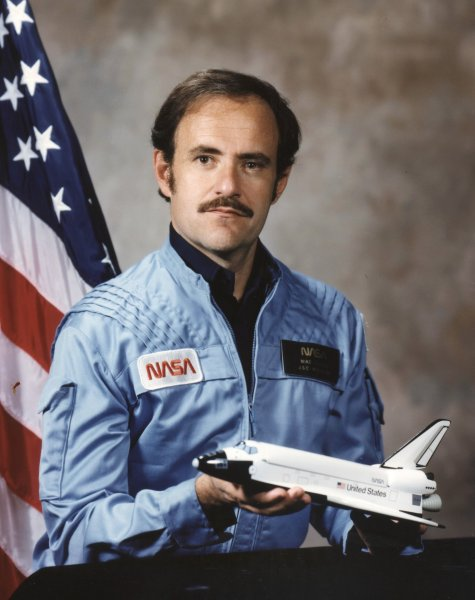
- Born: John Michael Lounge; June 28, 1946; Burlington, Colorado, U.S.
- Died: March 1, 2011 (aged 64)
- Education: United States Naval Academy (BS); University of Colorado, Boulder (MS)
- Space career

NASA astronaut
- Time in space: 20d 2h 23m
- Selection: NASA Group 9 (1980)
- Missions: STS-51-I; STS-26; STS-35

John Michael "Mike" Lounge (June 28, 1946 – March 1, 2011) was an American engineer, a United States Navy officer, a Vietnam War veteran, and a NASA astronaut. A veteran of three Space Shuttle flights, Lounge logged over 482 hours in space. He was a mission specialist on STS-51-I (1985) and STS-26 (1988) and was the flight engineer on STS-35 (1990).

== Personal ==
John Michael "Mike" Lounge was born June 28, 1946, in Denver, Colorado, but considered Burlington, Colorado to be his hometown. He graduated from Burlington High School in 1964, then received a Bachelor of Science degree from the U.S. Naval Academy in 1969 and a Master of Science degree in astrophysics from the University of Colorado at Boulder in 1970. Lounge was an associate fellow of the American Institute of Aeronautics and Astronautics. He is survived by his three children. The Lounge family is of Irish and Mexican descent.

== Military career ==
Lounge entered on active duty with the United States Navy following graduation from the U.S. Naval Academy and spent the next nine years in a variety of assignments. He completed Naval Flight Officer training at Pensacola, Florida, went on to advanced training as a radar intercept officer in the F-4J Phantom II, and subsequently reported to Fighter Squadron 142 (VF-142) based at Naval Air Station Miramar, California. While with VF-142, he completed a nine-month Southeast Asia cruise aboard USS Enterprise (participating in 99 combat missions in the Vietnam War) and a seven-month Mediterranean cruise aboard USS America. In 1974, he returned to the U.S. Naval Academy as an instructor in the Physics Department. Lounge transferred to the Navy Space Project Office in Washington, D.C., in 1976, for a two-year tour as a staff project office. He resigned his regular Navy commission in 1978 and joined the Naval Air Reserve. While in the Naval Air Reserve, he served in Reserve Fighter Squadron 201. Later, he became a Lieutenant Colonel in the Texas Air National Guard, serving with the 147th Fighter Interceptor Group.

== NASA career ==
Lounge was employed at the Lyndon B. Johnson Space Center beginning in July 1978. During this time, he worked as lead engineer for Space Shuttle-launched satellites, and also served as a member of the Skylab Reentry Flight Control Team. He completed these assignments while with the Payload Operations Division.

Selected as an astronaut candidate by NASA in 1980, he completed a one-year training and evaluation period, and became an astronaut in August 1981. He served as a member of the launch support team at Kennedy Space Center for the STS-1, STS-2, and STS-3 missions. Following his first flight, he was assigned to the first mission to carry the Centaur (cryogenically fueled) upper stage (STS-61-F). After the mission was canceled, he participated in Space Station design development. From 1989 through 1991, Lounge served as Chief of the Space Station Support Office, representing astronaut interests in Space Station design and operation planning.

=== Spaceflights ===
STS-51-I Space Shuttle Discovery, launched from Kennedy Space Center, Florida, on August 27, 1985. During that mission Lounge's duties included deployment of the Australian AUSSAT communications satellite and operation of the Remote Manipulator System (RMS). The crew deployed two other communications satellites, the Navy's SYNCOM IV-4, and American Satellite Company's ASC-1, and also performed a successful on-orbit rendezvous and repair of the ailing 15,400 lb (6,990 kg) SYNCOM IV-3 satellite. STS-51-I completed 112 orbits of the Earth before landing at Edwards Air Force Base, California, on September 3, 1985. Mission duration was 171 hours, 17 minutes, 42 seconds.

STS-26 Discovery, the first flight to be flown after the Challenger accident, launched from the Kennedy Space Center on September 29, 1988. During the four-day mission, the crewmen successfully deployed the Tracking and Data Relay Satellite (TDRS-C), which was subsequently carried to orbit by the Inertial Upper Stage (IUS) rocket. They also operated eleven mid-deck experiments. Discovery completed 64 orbits of the Earth before landing at Edwards Air Force Base, California, on October 3, 1988. Mission duration was 97 hours, 57 seconds.

STS-35 Columbia, launched from the Kennedy Space Center on December 2, 1990. Lounge served as flight engineer on this 9-day flight that was dedicated to astronomy. Observations of the Universe were collected by the ASTRO-1 ultraviolet telescope and by the Broad Band X-ray Telescope. Columbia completed 142 orbits of the Earth before landing at Edwards Air Force Base, California, on December 10, 1990. Mission duration was 215 hours, 5 minutes, 8 seconds.

== Post-NASA career ==
Lounge resigned from NASA in June 1991 to join SPACEHAB (now Astrotech Corporation). At the time, Lounge explained his resignation from the NASA Astronaut Corps by saying "This is a very tough job to leave, but I feel that three flights is my fair share, and I'm ready for a new challenge."

In 2002, Lounge became Director of Space Shuttle and Space Station Program Development for Boeing. Two years later he became Director for Business Development for integrated defense systems and space exploration.

Lounge joined Sure Secure Solutions, an 8(a) company, as Director Business Development in March 2010. He also launched his new engineering venture Cisneros Innovation Strategies the same year.

== Death ==
Lounge died on March 1, 2011, of complications from liver cancer.

== Awards and honors ==
- Navy Air Medals (6)
- Navy Commendation Medals (with Combat "V") (3)
- Johnson Space Center Superior Achievement Award (for service as a member of the Skylab Reentry Team)
- NASA Exceptional Service Medals (3)
- NASA Space Flight Medals (3)
- Part of 18th Street in his hometown of Burlington, Colorado was renamed Mike Lounge Drive in his honor.
