= STS-26 =

1988 American crewed spaceflight

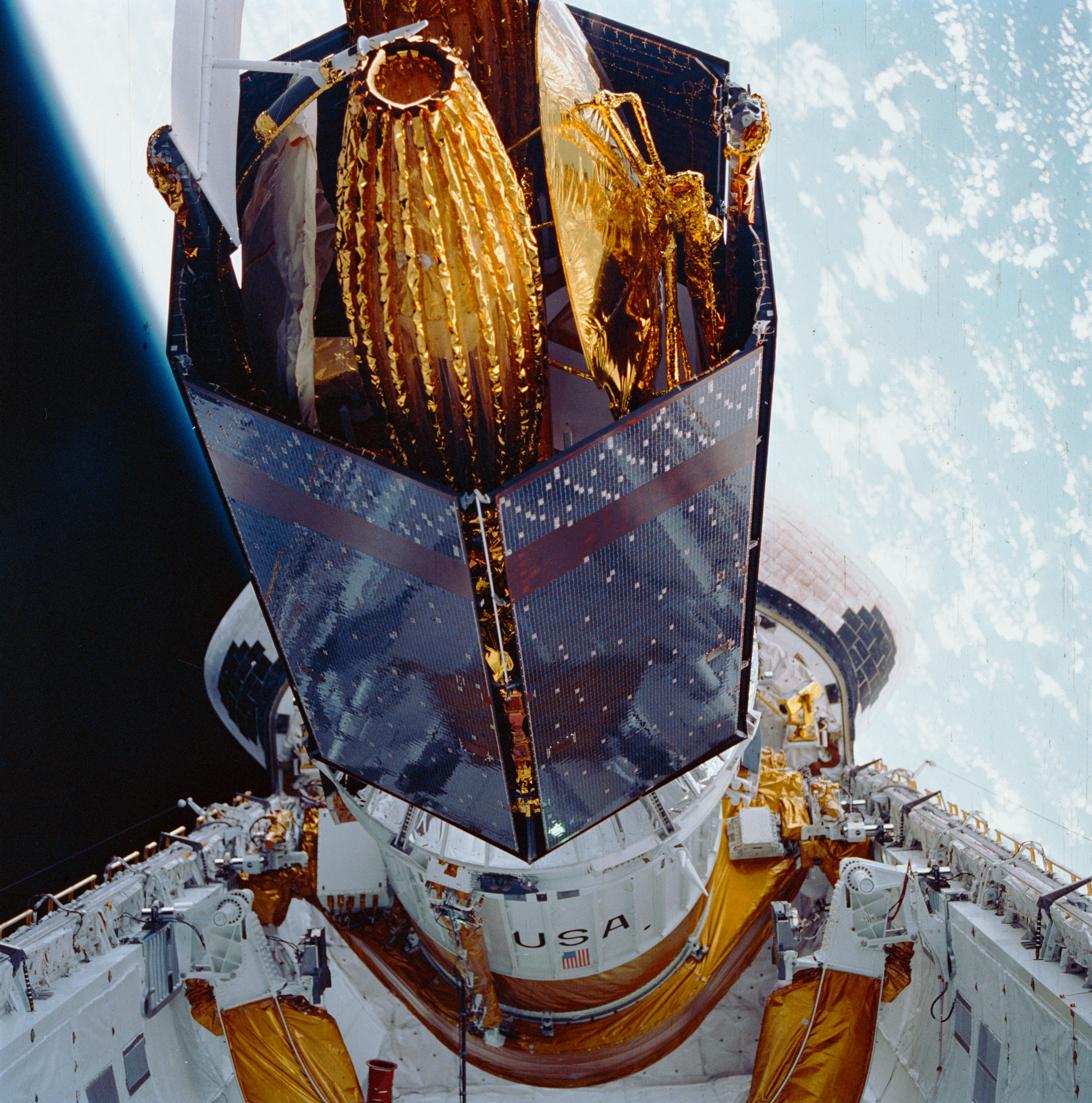
- TDRS-C and its IUS in the payload bay of Discovery
- Names: Space Transportation System-26; STS-26R
- Mission type: Return to Flight and TDRS-C deployment
- Operator: NASA
- COSPAR ID: 1988-091A
- SATCAT no.: 19547
- Mission duration: 4 days, 1 hour, 11 seconds
- Distance travelled: 2,703,000 km (1,680,000 mi)
- Orbits completed: 64

Spacecraft properties
- Spacecraft: Space Shuttle Discovery
- Launch mass: 115,487 kg (254,605 lb)
- Landing mass: 88,078 kg (194,179 lb)
- Payload mass: 21,082 kg (46,478 lb)

Crew
- Crew size: 5
- Members: Frederick H. Hauck; Richard O. Covey; John M. Lounge; David C. Hilmers; George D. Nelson

Start of mission
- Launch date: September 29, 1988, 15:37:00 UTC (11:37 am EDT)
- Launch site: Kennedy, LC-39B
- Contractor: Rockwell International

End of mission
- Landing date: October 3, 1988, 16:37:11 UTC (9:37:11 am PDT)
- Landing site: Edwards, Runway 17

Orbital parameters
- Reference system: Geocentric orbit
- Regime: Low Earth orbit
- Perigee altitude: 301 km (187 mi)
- Apogee altitude: 306 km (190 mi)
- Inclination: 28.45°
- Period: 90.60 minutes

Instruments
- Automated Directional Solidification Furnace (ADSF); Aggregation of Red Blood Cells (ARC); Earth-Limb Radiance Experiment (ELRAD); Isoelectric Focusing Experiment (IFE); Infrared Communications Flight Experiment (IRCFE); Mesoscale Lightning Experiment (MLE); Orbiter Experiments Autonomous Supporting Instrumentation System (OASIS); Phase Partitioning Experiment (PPE); Physical Vapor Transport of Organic Solids (PVTOS-2); Protein Crystal Growth (PCG); Two Shuttle Student Involvement Program (SSIP); Voice Control Unit (VCU)
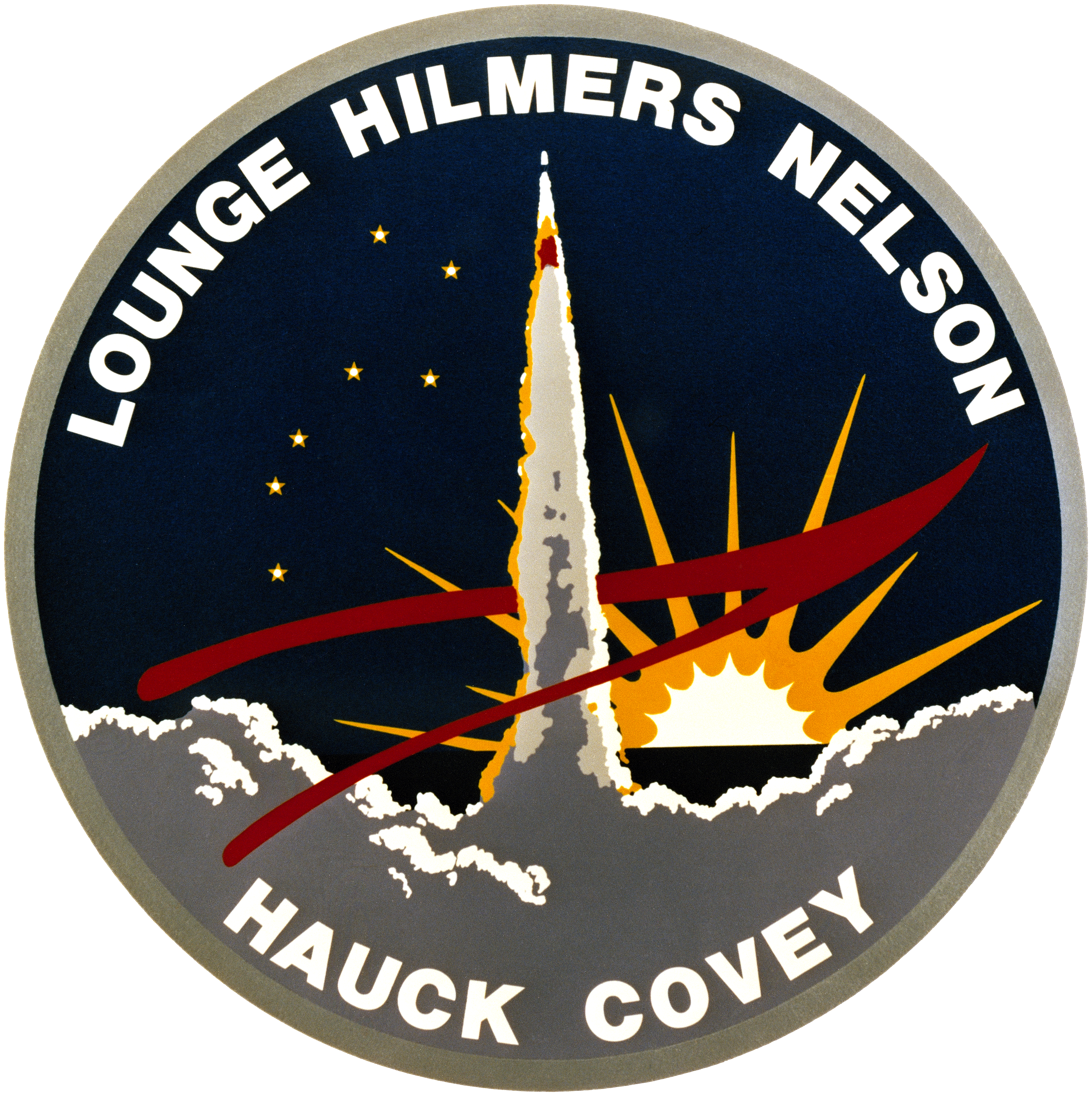
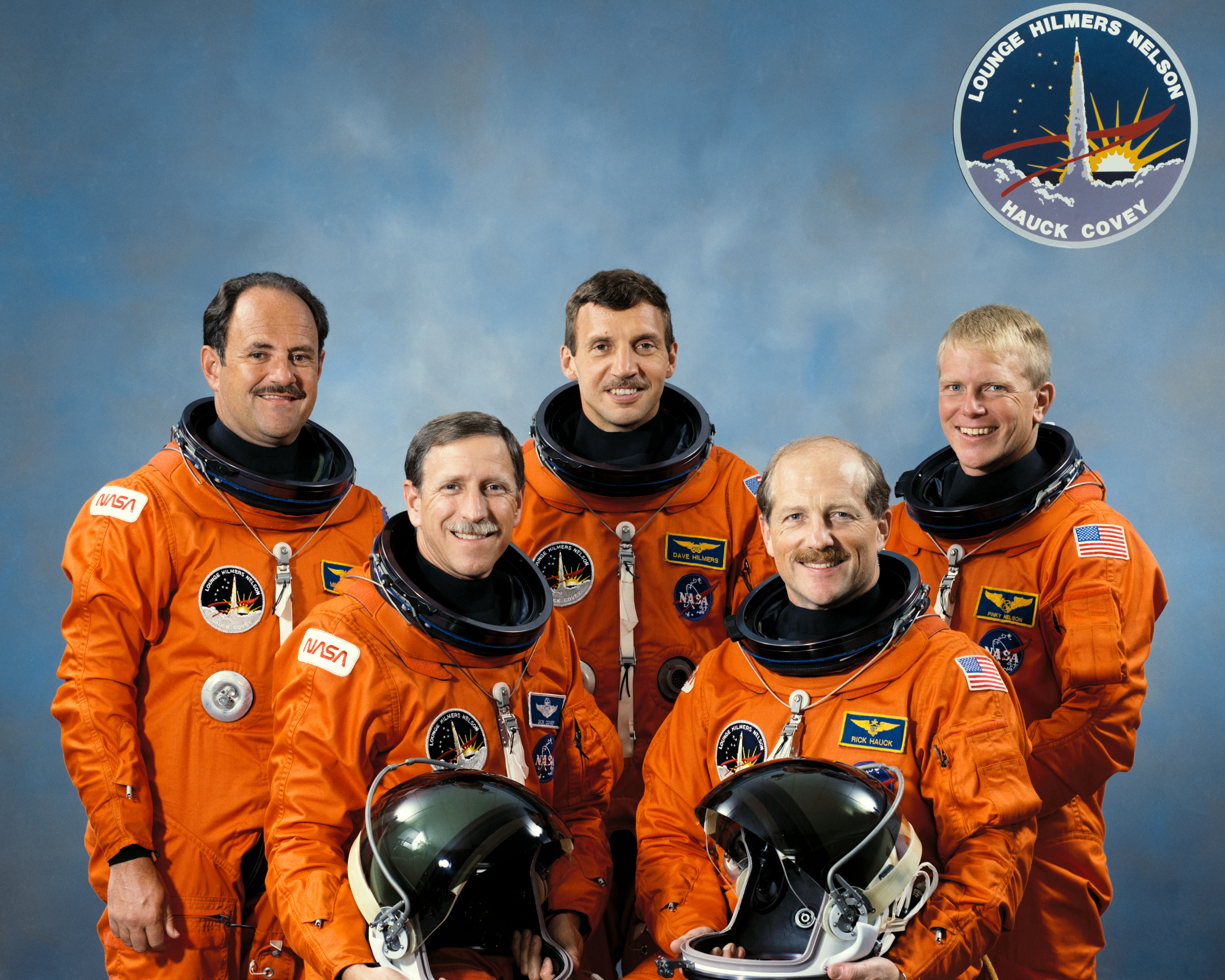
- STS-26 mission patch Back row: Lounge, Hilmers and Nelson; Front row: Covey and Hauck Space Shuttle program

STS-26 was the 26th NASA Space Shuttle mission and the seventh flight of the orbiter Discovery. The mission launched from Kennedy Space Center, Florida, on September 29, 1988, and landed four days later on October 3, 1988. STS-26 was declared the "Return to Flight" mission, being the first mission after the Space Shuttle Challenger disaster of January 28, 1986. It was the first mission since STS-9 to use the original Space Transportation System (STS) numbering system, the first to have all its crew members wear pressure suits for launch and landing since STS-4, and the first mission with bailout capacity since STS-4. STS-26 was also the first U.S. space mission with an all-veteran crew since Apollo 11, with all of its crew members having flown at least one prior mission.

The mission is technically designated STS-26R, as the original STS-26 designation previously belonged to STS-51-F (also known as Spacelab-2). Likewise all flights with the STS-26 through STS-33 designations would require the R in their documentation to avoid conflicts in tracking data between the old and new flight designations.

== Crew ==
Position	Astronaut
Commander	Frederick H. Hauck; Third and last spaceflight
Pilot	Richard O. Covey; Second spaceflight
Mission Specialist 1	John M. Lounge; Second spaceflight
Mission Specialist 2 Flight Engineer	David C. Hilmers; Second spaceflight
Mission Specialist 3	George D. Nelson; Third and last spaceflight

The crew roster for STS-26 was based on the original crew assignment for STS-61-F, which would have launched the Ulysses probe from Challenger in 1986. Ulysses was eventually launched on STS-41. Hauck, Lounge and Hilmers were all assigned to that flight, with Roy D. Bridges Jr. as pilot. Bridges never flew again after the Challenger disaster, but would eventually become the director of Langley Research Center (LRC).

Covey was the CAPCOM operator during the STS-51-L launch who uttered the words, "Challenger, go at throttle up" to commander Francis R. Scobee, shortly after which the orbiter disintegrated. He also would have been the CAPCOM operator for the canceled STS-61-F mission during launch and landing.

=== Crew seat assignments ===
Seat	Launch	Landing	Seats 1–4 are on the flight deck. Seats 5–7 are on the mid-deck.
1	Hauck		Seats 1–4 are on the flight deck. Seats 5–7 are on the mid-deck.
2	Covey		Seats 1–4 are on the flight deck. Seats 5–7 are on the mid-deck.
3	Lounge		Seats 1–4 are on the flight deck. Seats 5–7 are on the mid-deck.
4	Hilmers		Seats 1–4 are on the flight deck. Seats 5–7 are on the mid-deck.
5	Nelson		Seats 1–4 are on the flight deck. Seats 5–7 are on the mid-deck.
6	Unused		Seats 1–4 are on the flight deck. Seats 5–7 are on the mid-deck.
7	Unused		Seats 1–4 are on the flight deck. Seats 5–7 are on the mid-deck.

== Mission summary ==
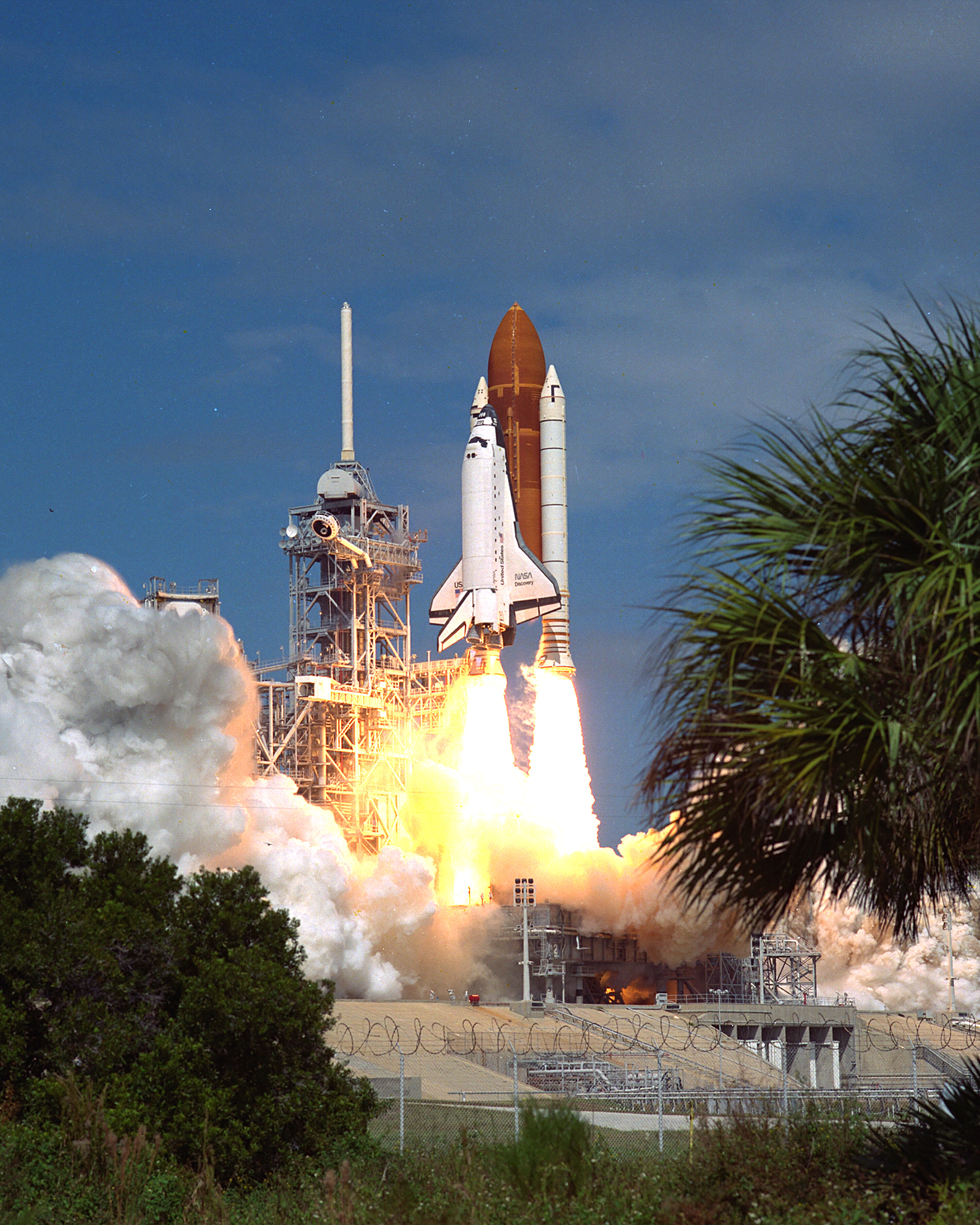
Discovery lifts off from KSC, the first shuttle mission after the Challenger disaster

Space Shuttle Discovery lifted off from Launch Complex 39B, Kennedy Space Center, at 11:37:00 a.m. EDT on September 29, 1988, 975 days after the Challenger disaster.

The launch was delayed by one hour and thirty-eight minutes due to unseasonable and unusual light winds, and the need to replace fuses in the cooling systems of two crew members' flight suits. The suits were repaired, and a waiver was issued for the wind conditions after officials determined there was a sufficient safety margin for wind loads on the orbiter's wing leading edges. At T−1:30, it was proposed that the launch be delayed at T−0:31 due to a cabin air pressure issue. It was quickly determined that the cabin pressure had been increased slightly by the activation of the oxygen systems in the crew's flight suits, and the launch was conducted without further delay. The shuttle crew—all veteran astronauts—included Commander Frederick H. "Rick" Hauck, Pilot Richard O. Covey, and Mission Specialists John M. "Mike" Lounge, George D. "Pinky" Nelson and David C. Hilmers.

The primary payload for the STS-26 mission, TDRS-C, was successfully deployed, and 11 scheduled mid-deck scientific and technological experiments were carried out. The post-Challenger redesigned solid rocket booster segment joints showed no signs of leakage or overheating. (Note: A leak and burn-through in one of those joints was the cause of the destruction of Challenger.)

Two minor problems occurred during the flight. After ascent, the Flash Evaporator System for cooling the orbiter iced up and shut down, increasing the crew cabin temperature to approximately 31 °C (88 °F). The problem was resolved on Flight Day 4 and cooler temperatures resulted. A Ku-band antenna for communications was deployed on Flight Day 2, but it failed to respond properly and had to be stowed for the remainder of the mission.

During STS-26, Discovery became the first spacecraft to fly in space equipped with a VCU (Voice Control Unit), a computer capable of recognising and responding to human speech. The VCU was created by SCI Systems in Huntsville, Alabama, and was based on technology licensed from the Votan company. This speech recognition system controlled the cameras and monitors that were used by the crew to monitor the Canadarm mechanical arm mounted in the cargo bay. Because of the experimental nature of speech recognition at the time, this system was not used for any critical operations. Initial problems almost sidelined the tests when the voice templates that were created prior to liftoff were found to have less than 60% recognition for one crew member and less than 40% recognition for another. This problem was corrected by retraining the templates. It was retested and found to be operational with a recognition success rate of over 96%. It was concluded that weightless conditions caused a fundamental change in human speech, making the templates created prior to liftoff virtually useless when in orbit.

Besides conducting the mission's various experiments, crew members practiced suiting up in new partial-pressure "launch-and-entry" flight suits, and also practiced the unstowing and attaching of the new crew escape system. On October 2, 1988, the day before the mission ended, the five-man crew paid tribute to the seven crew members lost in the Challenger disaster.

Discovery landed on Runway 17, Edwards Air Force Base, California, at 12:37:11 p.m. EDT on October 3, 1988, after a mission duration of approximately 4 days, 1 hour, 0 minute, and 11 seconds. Capsule Communicator Blaine Hammond Jr. welcomed the crew, saying it was "a great ending to a new beginning".

=== Payloads and experiments ===
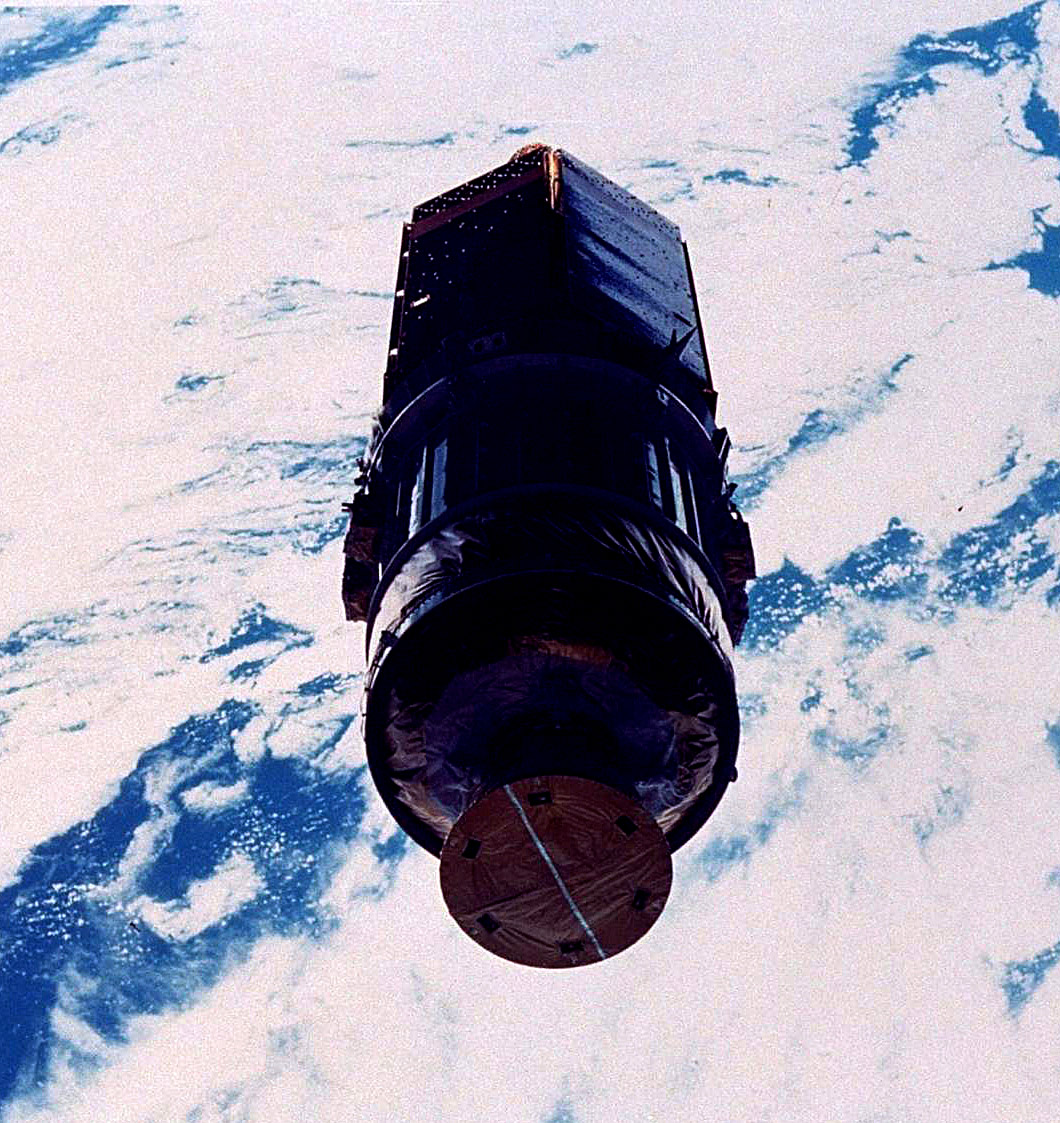
TDRS-3 after deployment

TDRS-C, which became TDRS-3 in orbit, and its attached Inertial Upper Stage (IUS), were deployed from Discovery's cargo bay six hours and 13 minutes into the flight. The first stage of the IUS placed TDRS-3 in a transfer orbit, and the second stage placed it in a geosynchronous orbit on September 30, 1988. TDRS-3 moved into position over the Pacific Ocean south of Hawaii at 171° west longitude. It joined TDRS-1 in tracking Earth-orbiting spacecraft; a sister satellite, TDRS-B, was lost in the Challenger accident. Also in the payload bay was the Orbiter Experiments Autonomous Supporting Instrumentation System (OASIS). OASIS recorded environmental data on the orbiter and the TDRS payload during various inflight phases.

All the mission's mid-deck experiments were deemed to have been performed successfully. However, there were some glitches with two of the five materials science experiments. In the Protein Crystal Growth (PCG) experiment, two of the 11 proteins processed – including an enzyme believed to be key to the replication of AIDS – did not produce crystals suitable for analysis. Also, there were some equipment problems with the Automated Directional Solidification Furnace (ADSF), an experiment to investigate the melting and solidification of various materials in zero-gravity.

The materials processing experiments included two Shuttle Student Involvement Projects, one on titanium grain formation and the other on controlling crystal growth with a membrane. Another materials science experiment, the Physical Vapor Transport of Organic Solids-2 (PVTOS-2), was a joint project of NASA's Office of Commercial Programs and the 3M company.

Three life sciences experiments were conducted, including one on the aggregation of red blood cells, intended to help determine if microgravity can play a beneficial role in clinical research and medical diagnostic tests. Two further experiments involved atmospheric sciences, while one was in communications research.

=== List of payloads ===
==== Primary payload ====
- NASA's TDRS-C satellite, attached to an Inertial Upper Stage (IUS), became the second Tracking and Data Relay Satellite System (TDRSS) deployed. After deployment, the IUS propelled the satellite into a geosynchronous orbit.

==== Secondary payloads ====
- Physical Vapor Transport of Organic Solids (PVTOS-2)
- Protein Crystal Growth (PCG)
- Infrared Communications Flight Experiment (IRCFE)
- Aggregation of Red Blood Cells (ARC)
- Isoelectric Focusing Experiment (IFE)
- Mesoscale Lightning Experiment (MLE)
- Phase Partitioning Experiment (PPE)
- Earth-Limb Radiance Experiment (ELRAD)
- Automated Directional Solidification Furnace (ADSF)
- Two Shuttle Student Involvement Program (SSIP) experiments
- Voice Control Unit test and evaluation (VCU)

=== Damage to thermal protection ===
Discovery suffered severe damage to its thermal protection tiles in the underwing area. Post-flight analysis showed that the impact of a 30 cm (12 in) long piece of cork insulation during ascent was the culprit. The origin of the debris was the forward field joint on the right-hand SRB. The damage was such that, during re-entry, the thermal protection tile eroded almost completely. A similar chain of events ultimately led to the loss of Columbia fifteen years later.

== Wake-up calls ==
NASA began a tradition of playing music to astronauts during the Project Gemini, and first used music to awaken a flight crew during Apollo 15. Each track is specially chosen, often by the astronauts' families, and usually has a special meaning to an individual member of the crew, or is applicable to their daily activities. Kathryn D. Sullivan chose the wakeup music for STS-26, including a contribution from Robin Williams, who provided a pastiche of his Good Morning, Vietnam radio greeting.

Flight Day	Song	Artist/Composer
Day 2	"Gooooooood Morning Discovery!!"	Robin Williams
Day 3	"I Get Around" parody	Mike Cahill
Day 4	"Fun, Fun, Fun..." parody	Mike Cahill

== Gallery ==
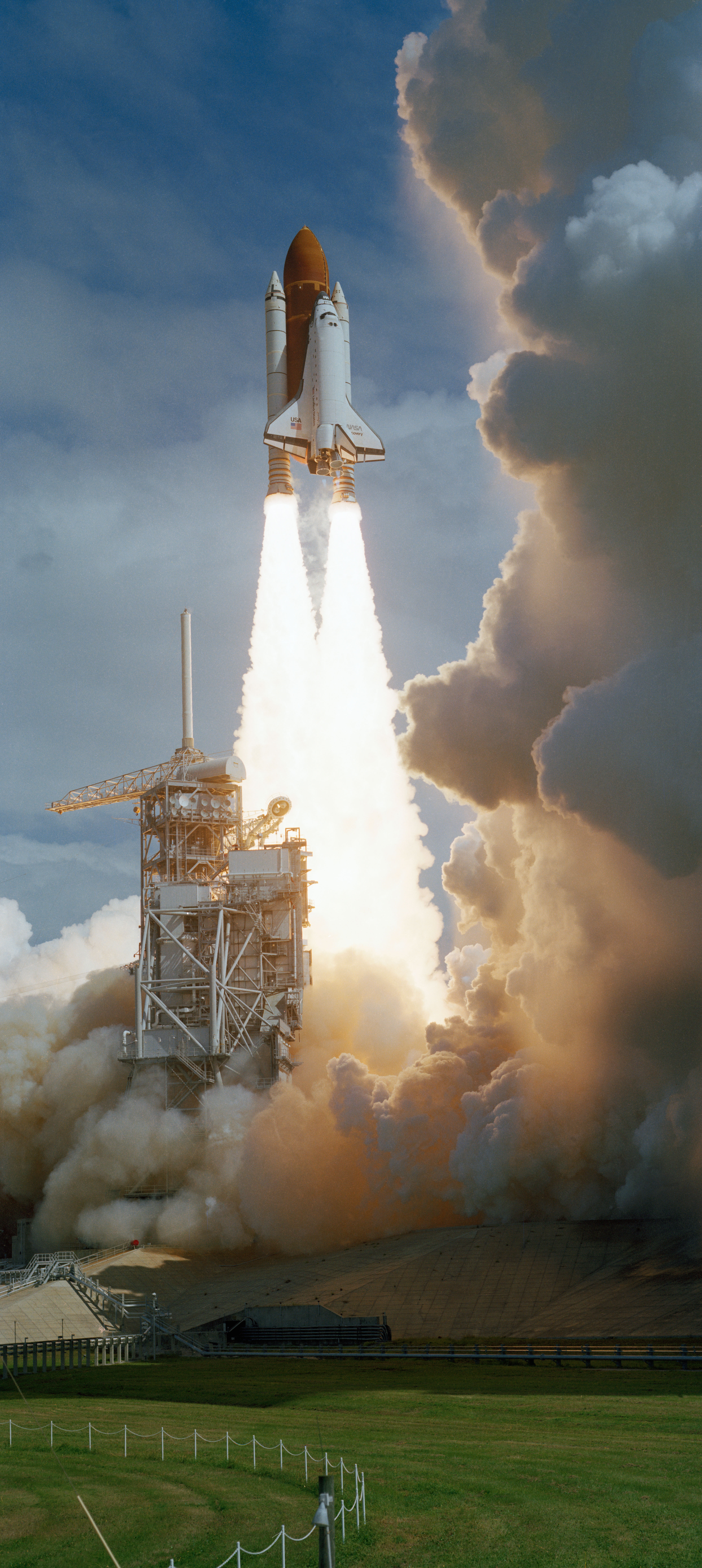
Discovery launches from Kennedy Space Center

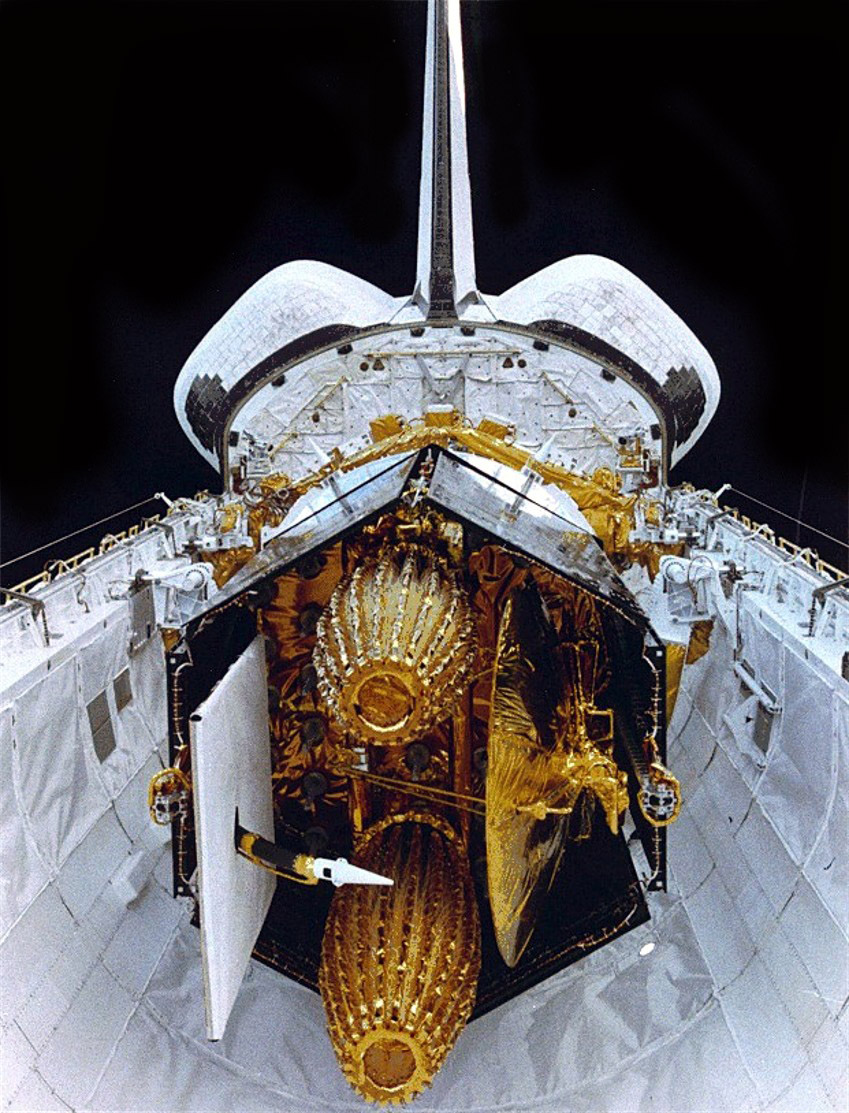
A view of the shuttle's cargo bay

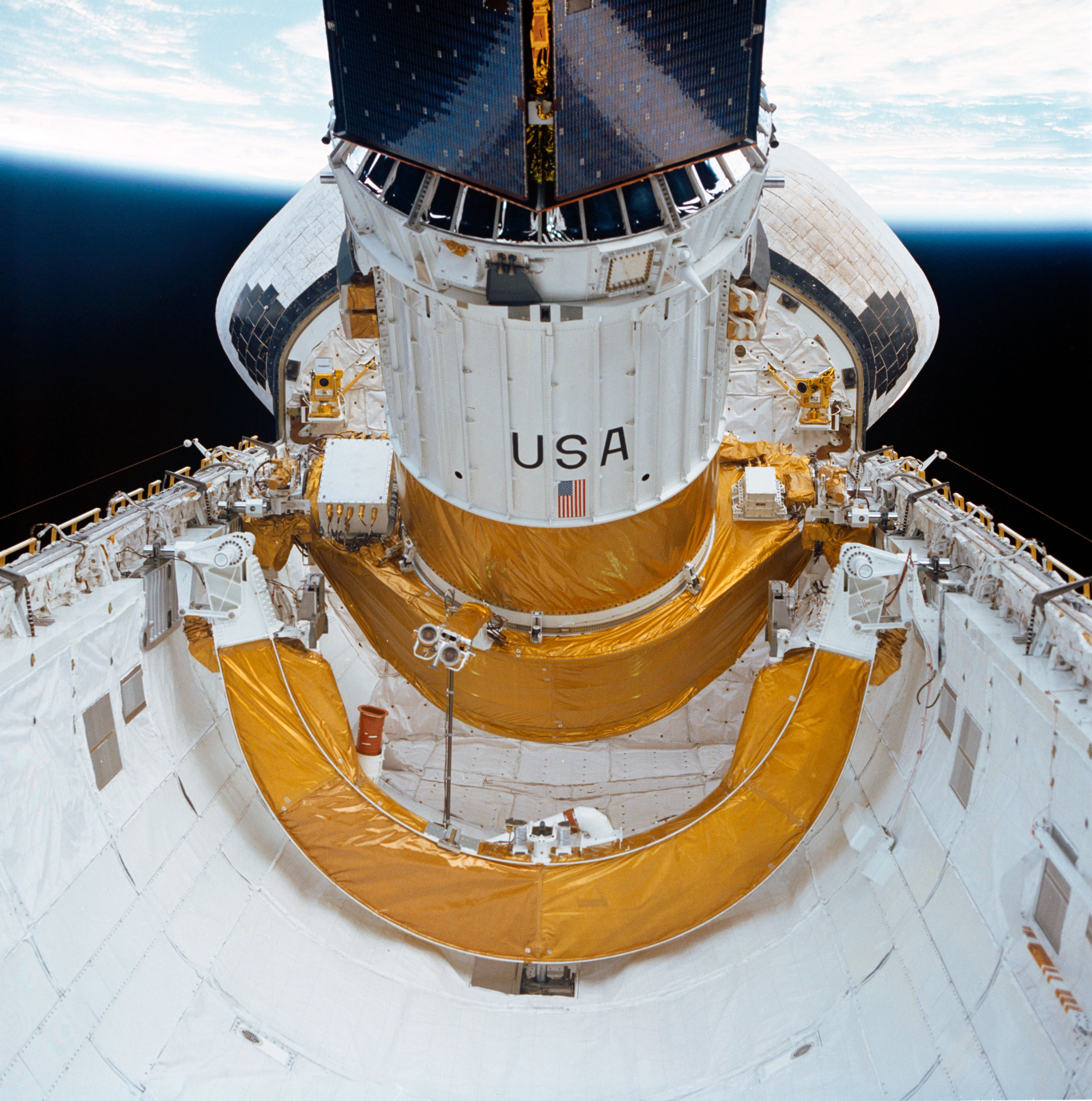
The tilt table in its deploy position

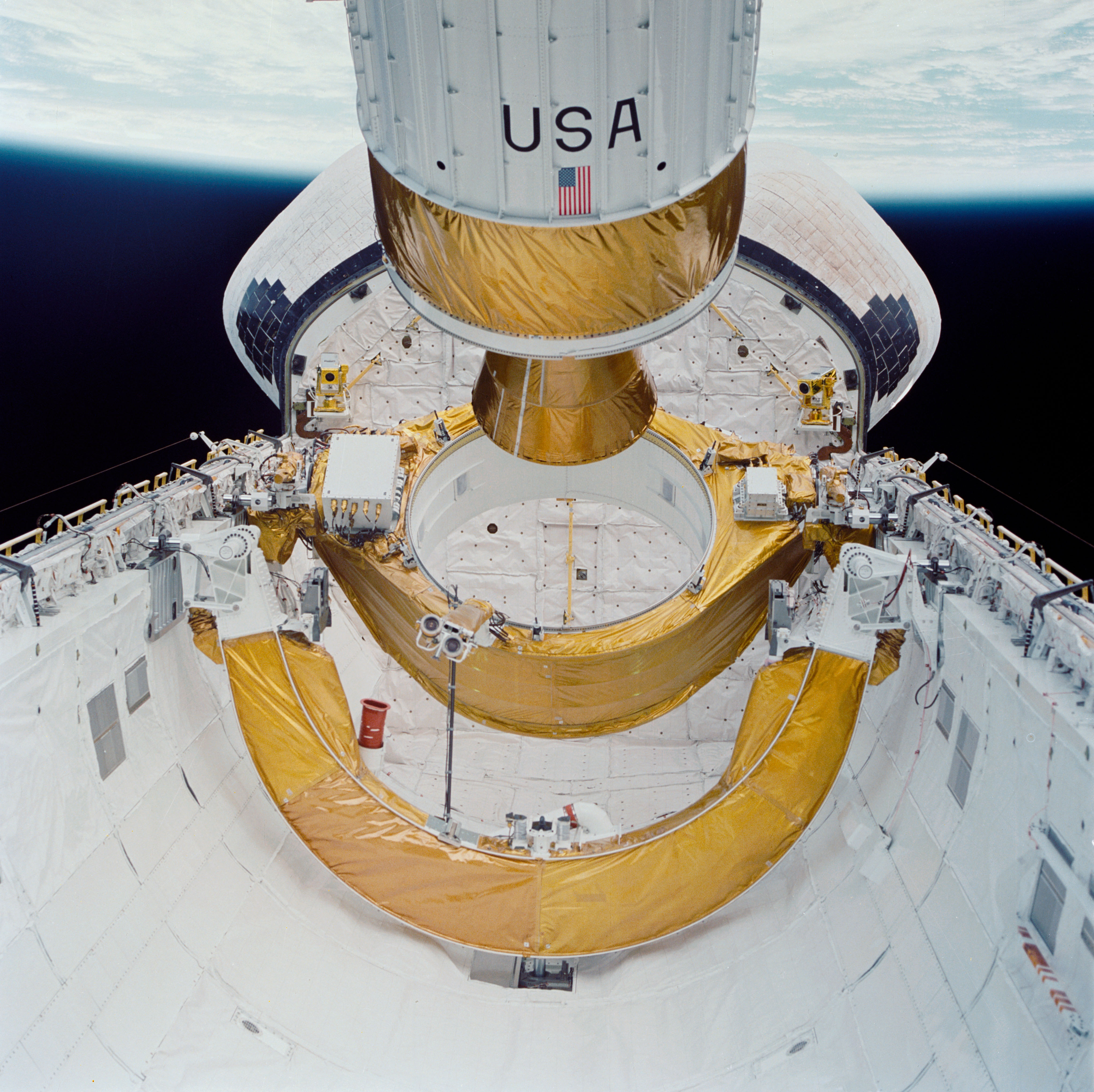
The release of the TDRS

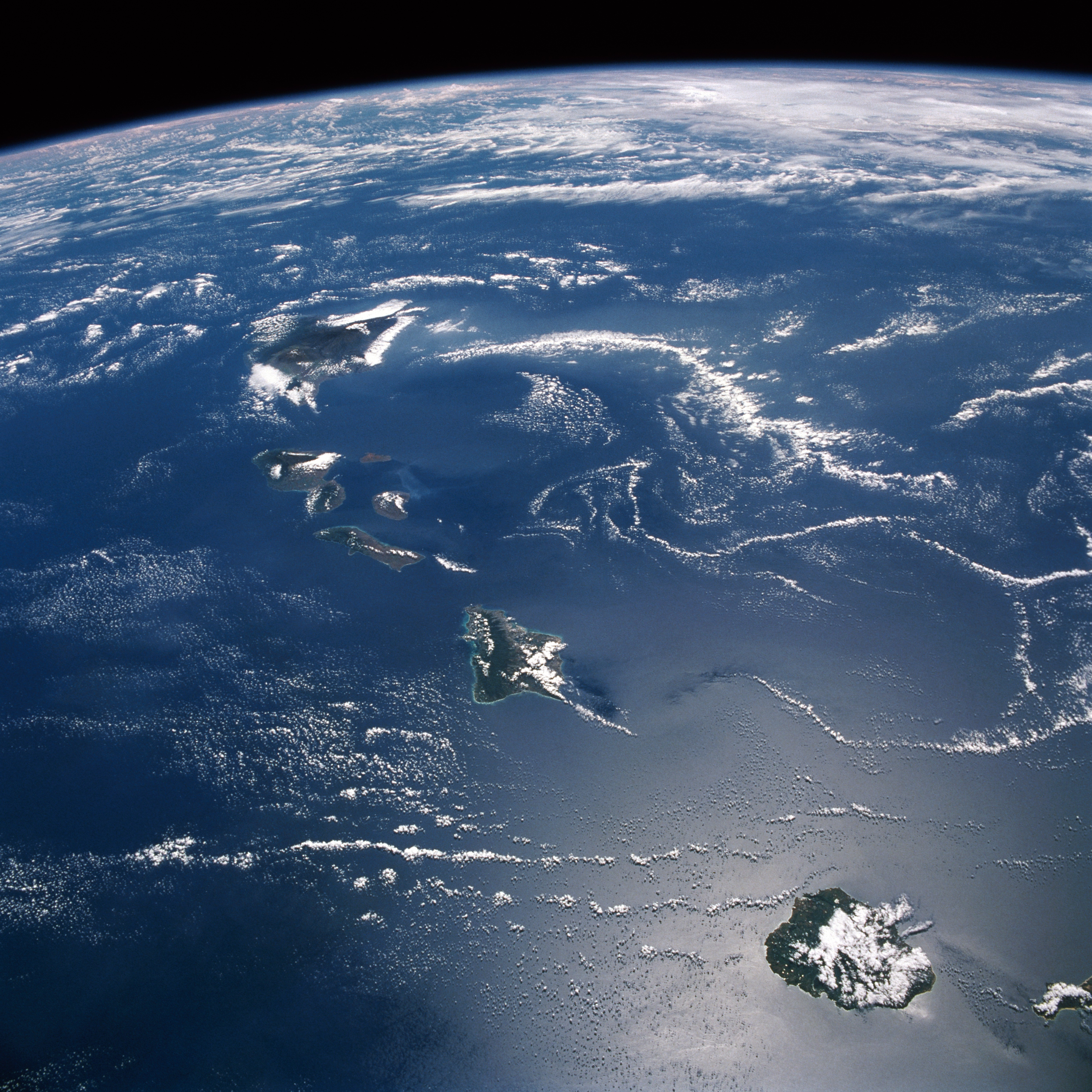
The Hawaiian Islands imaged from orbit

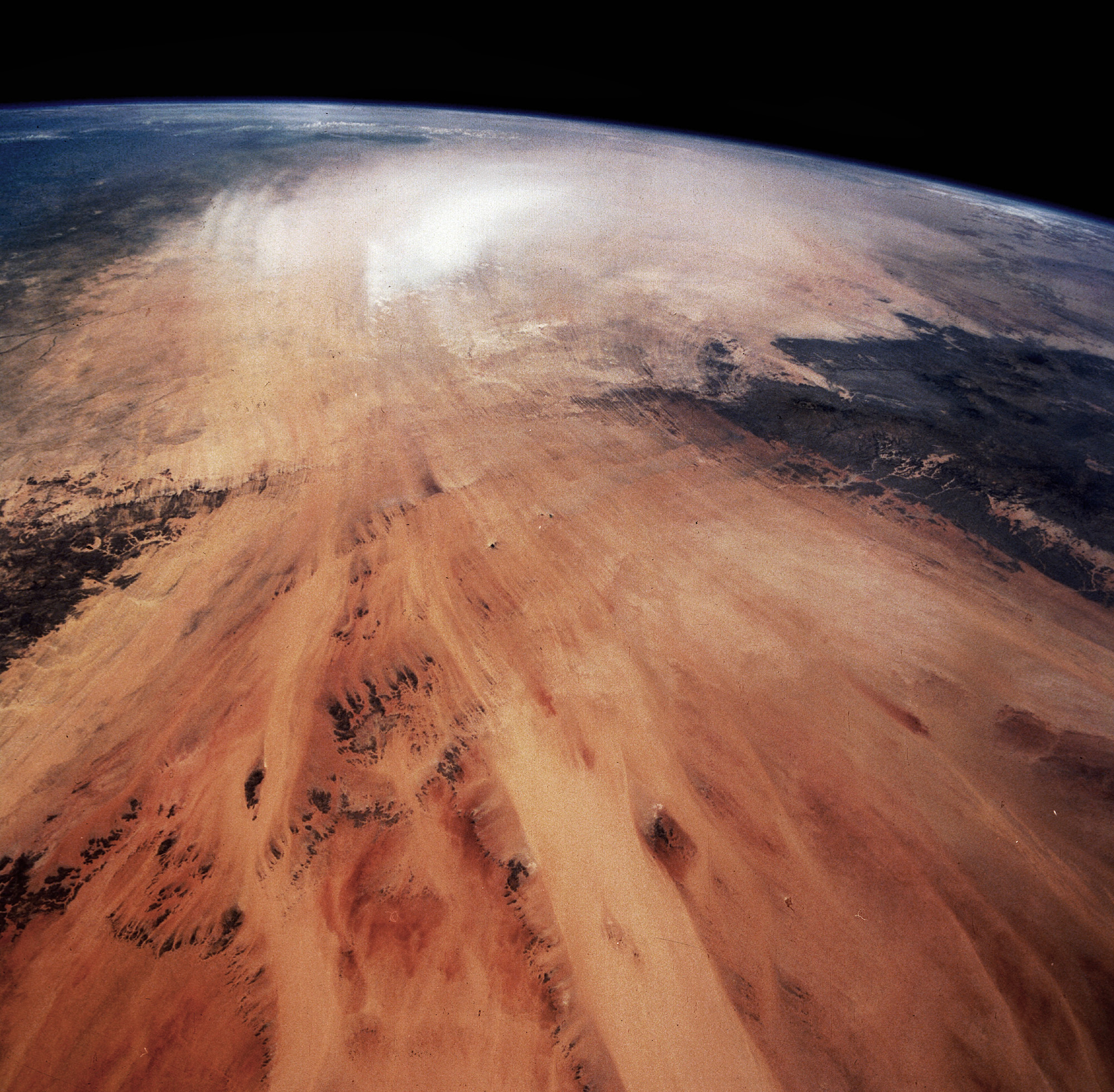
Chad imaged from orbit

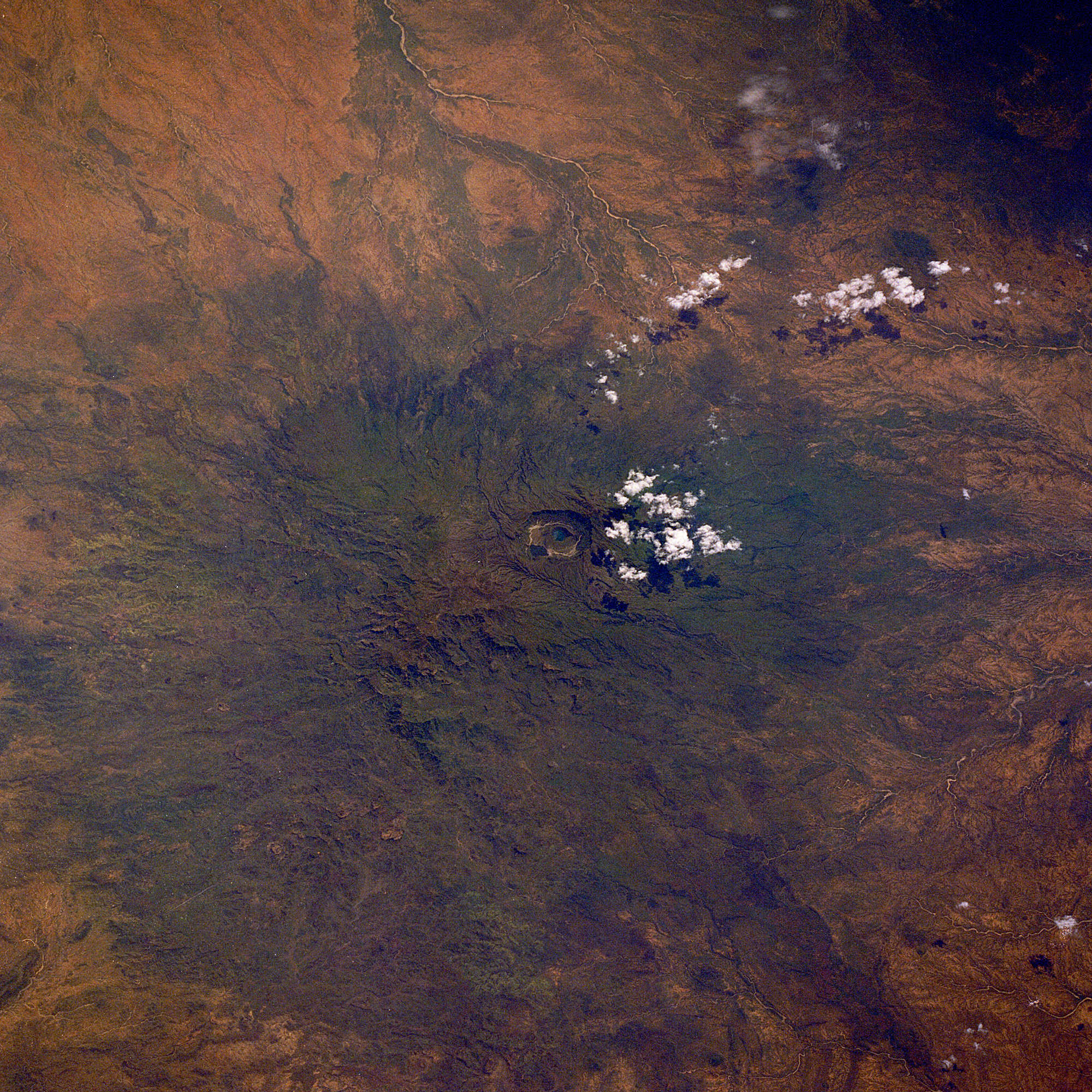
Jebel Marra, Sudan, imaged from orbit

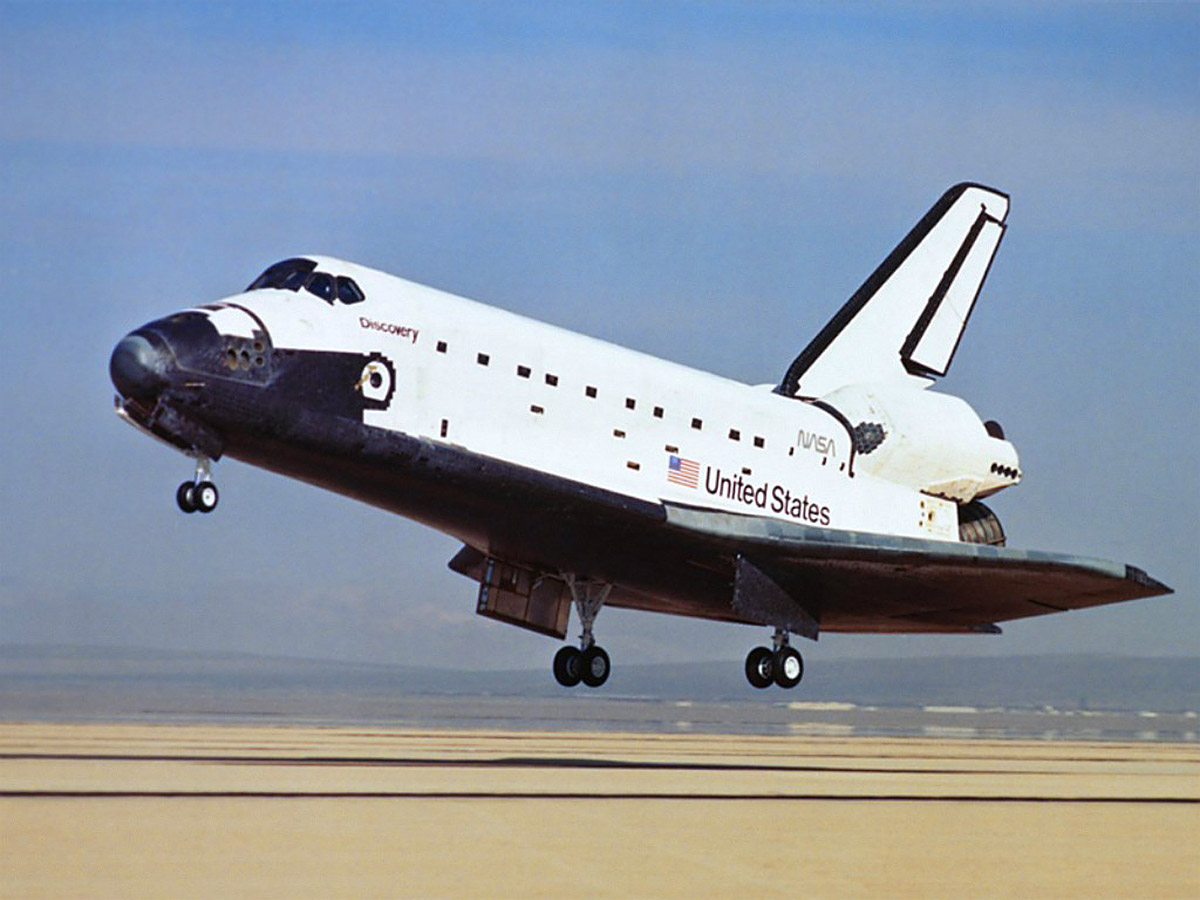
Discovery landing at the end of STS-26

== See also ==
- List of human spaceflights
- List of Space Shuttle missions
