= David C. Hilmers =

American astronaut (born 1950)

David Hilmers
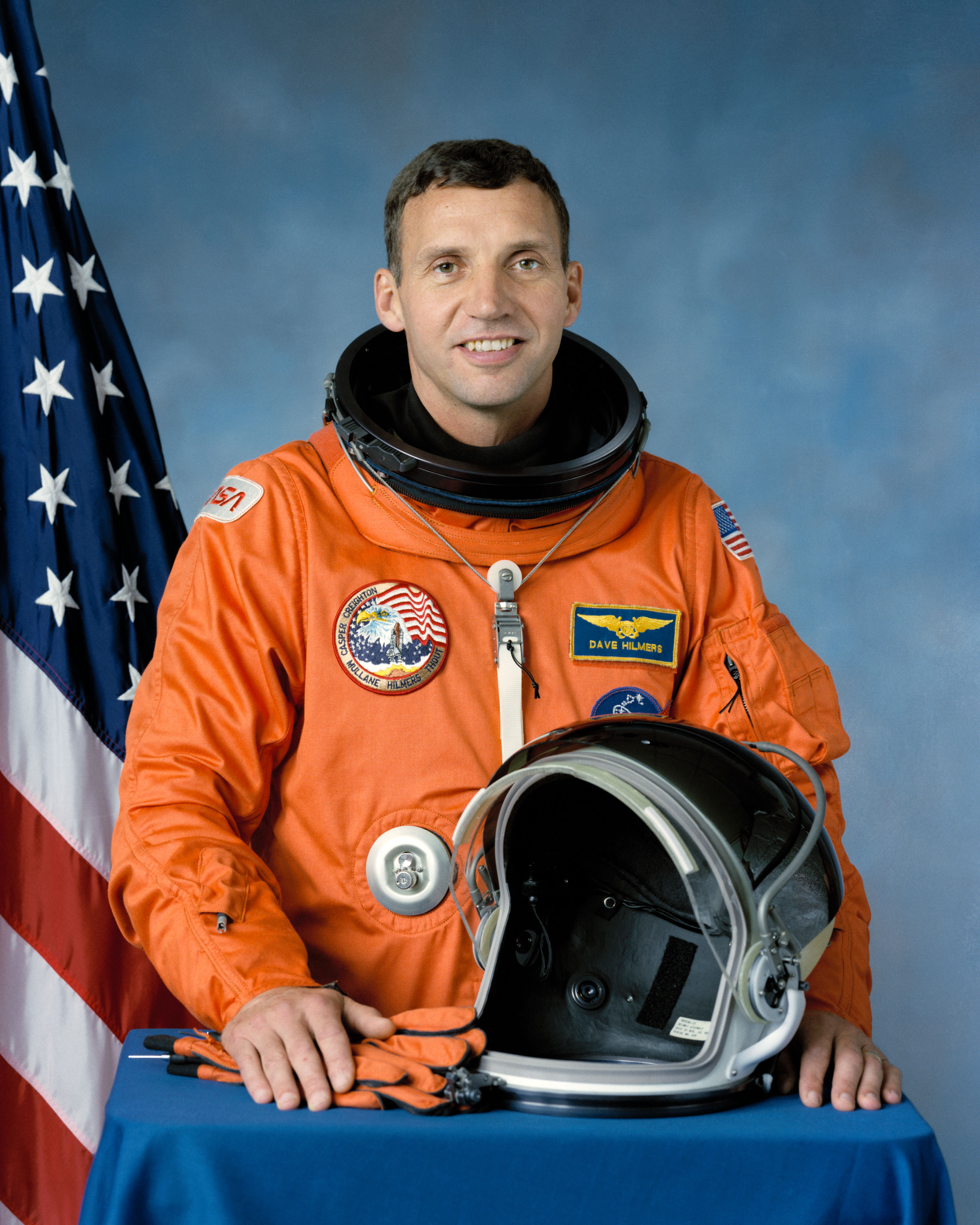
- Born: David Carl Hilmers; January 28, 1950 (age 76); Clinton, Iowa, U.S.
- Education: Cornell College (BA); Naval Postgraduate School (MS, Eng); Baylor College of Medicine (MD); University of Texas, Houston (MPH)
- Space career

NASA astronaut
- Rank: Colonel, USMC
- Time in space: 20d 14h 16m
- Selection: NASA Group 9 (1980)
- Mission: STS-51-J; STS-26; STS-36; STS-42

David Carl Hilmers (born January 28, 1950) is a former NASA astronaut who flew four Space Shuttle missions. He was born in Clinton, Iowa, but considers DeWitt, Iowa, to be his hometown. He has two grown sons. His recreational interests include playing the piano, gardening, electronics, spending time with his family, and all types of sports. His parents are deceased. With five academic degrees, he is the second most formally educated U.S. astronaut, behind Story Musgrave and Lee Morin with six.

== Education ==
Graduated from Central Community High School in DeWitt, Iowa, in 1968; received a Bachelor of Arts degree in mathematics (summa cum laude) from Cornell College in 1972, a Master of Science degree in electrical engineering (with distinction) in 1977, and the degree of Electrical Engineer from the U.S. Naval Postgraduate School in 1978. He received a Doctor of Medicine (M.D.) degree from the Baylor College of Medicine in 1995 with honors and a Master of Science degree in Public Health (MPH) from the UTHealth School of Public Health at University of Texas Health Science Center at Houston (UTHealth) in 2002.

== Experience ==
Hilmers entered active duty with the United States Marine Corps in July 1972. On completing The Basic School and Naval Flight Officer School, he was assigned to VMA(AW)-121 at Marine Corps Air Station Cherry Point, North Carolina, flying the A-6 Intruder as a bombardier-navigator. In 1975, he became an air liaison officer with the 1st Battalion, 2nd Marines, stationed with the Sixth Fleet in the Mediterranean. He graduated from the U.S. Naval Postgraduate School in 1978 and was later assigned to the 1st Marine Aircraft Wing at Marine Corps Air Station Iwakuni, Japan. He was stationed with the 3rd Marine Aircraft Wing at Marine Corps Air Station El Toro, California, at the time of his selection by NASA.

== NASA experience ==
Hilmers was selected a NASA astronaut in July 1980 and completed the initial training period in August 1981. In 1983 he was selected as a member of the launch-ready standby crew. His early NASA assignments have included work on rocket upper stages such as PAM, IUS, and Centaur, as well as Shuttle software verification at the Shuttle Avionics Integration Laboratory (SAIL). In addition, he was the Astronaut Office training coordinator, worked on various Department of Defense payloads, served as a spacecraft communicator (CAPCOM) at Mission Control for STS-41-D, STS-41-G, STS-51-A, STS-51-C and STS-51-D, worked Space Station issues for the Astronaut Office, and served as head of the Mission Development Branch within the Astronaut Office. In May 1985 he was named to the crew of STS-61-F, which was to deploy the Ulysses spacecraft on an interplanetary trajectory using a Centaur upper stage. This mission was to have flown in May 1986, but the Shuttle Centaur project was terminated in July 1986, and Hilmers then worked in the areas of ascent abort development, payload safety, and Shuttle on-board software. During 1987 he was involved in training for STS-26 and in flight software development. He later became head of the Mission Development branch in the astronaut office.

A veteran of four space flights, he has logged over 493 hours in space. He served as a mission specialist on STS-51-J (October 3–7, 1985), STS-26 (September 29 to October 3, 1988), STS-36 (February 28 to March 4, 1990), and STS-42 (January 22–30, 1992).

== Space flight experience ==
STS-51-J Atlantis, a classified Department of Defense mission, launched from Kennedy Space Center, Florida, on October 3, 1985. This was the maiden voyage of the Orbiter Atlantis. Hilmers had prime responsibility for a number of on-orbit activities during the mission. After 98 hours of orbital operations, Atlantis landed at Edwards Air Force Base, California, on October 7, 1985.

STS-26 Discovery, the first mission to be flown after the Challenger accident, was launched from the Kennedy Space Center, Florida, on September 29, 1988. During the four-day mission, the crew successfully deployed the Tracking and Data Relay Satellite (TDRS-C), which was subsequently carried to orbit by the Inertial Upper Stage (IUS) rocket. They also operated eleven mid-deck experiments. Discovery completed 64 orbits of the Earth before landing at Edwards Air Force Base, California, on October 3, 1988.

STS-36 Atlantis launched from the Kennedy Space Center, Florida, on February 28, 1990. This mission carried Department of Defense payloads and a number of secondary payloads. After 72 orbits of the Earth, the STS-36 mission concluded with a lakebed landing at Edwards Air Force Base, California, on March 4, 1990, after traveling 1.87 million miles.

Hilmers replaced Manley Lanier "Sonny" Carter Jr., killed in a plane crash, for his last mission. STS-42 Discovery launched from the Kennedy Space Center, Florida, on January 22, 1992. Fifty-five major experiments conducted in the International Microgravity Laboratory-1 module were provided by investigators from eleven countries, and represented a broad spectrum of scientific disciplines. During 128 orbits of the Earth, the STS-42 crew accomplished the mission's primary objective of investigating the effects of microgravity on materials processing and life sciences. In this unique laboratory in space, crew members worked around-the-clock in two shifts. Experiments investigated the microgravity effects on the growth of protein and semiconductor crystals. Biological experiments on the effects of zero gravity on plants, tissues, bacteria, insects and human vestibular response were also conducted. This eight-day mission culminated in a landing at Edwards Air Force Base, California, on January 30, 1992.

== Post-NASA experience ==
Hilmers decided to apply to medical school while training for his third shuttle flight. He attended pre-med courses at night while training for his fourth flight. Hilmers retired from NASA and the United States Marine Corps in October 1992, and went on to complete medical school and residency in the combined Internal Medicine/Pediatrics program at Baylor College of Medicine. He currently holds the rank of Professor in the departments of Internal Medicine and Pediatrics, the Center for Space Medicine, and Baylor Global Initiatives at the Baylor College of Medicine in Houston, Texas. In addition to his teaching and clinical duties, he is involved in research in global health and malnutrition in many countries. He spends much of his spare time providing humanitarian medical care locally in Houston and in developing nations, including disaster relief efforts in Iraq, Peru, Sri Lanka, the Philippines, Haiti, in Liberia during the Ebola outbreak in 2014, and development of hepatitis B clinical and public health services in Madagascar, North Korea and Kiribati through affiliation with Hepatitis B Free.
