= TDRS-3 =

American communications satellite

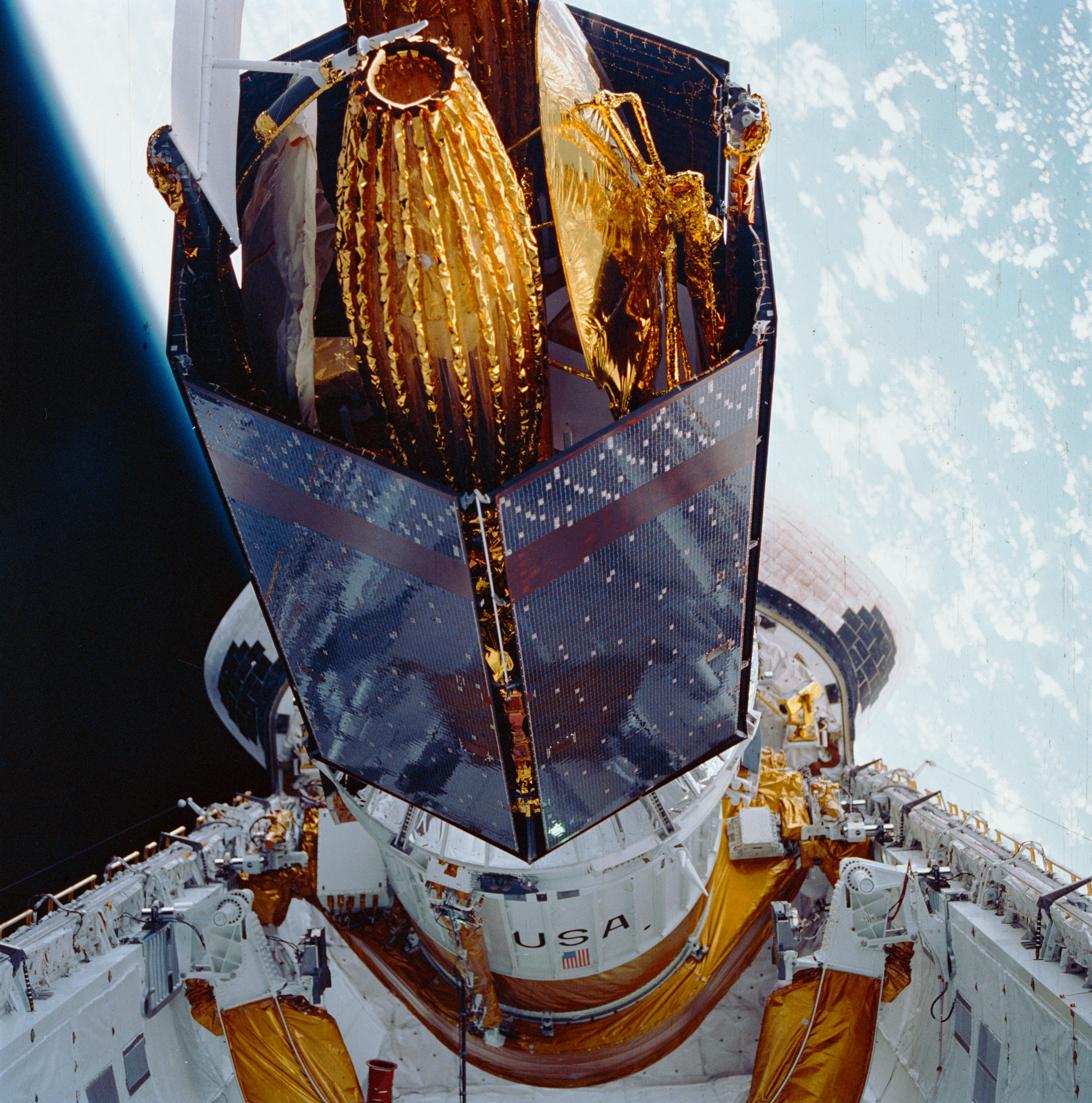
- TDRS-C aboard Discovery
- Mission type: Communication
- Operator: NASA
- COSPAR ID: 1988-091B
- SATCAT no.: 19548
- Mission duration: Planned: 10 years Elapsed: 37 years, 3 months, 2 days

Spacecraft properties
- Bus: TDRS
- Manufacturer: TRW
- Launch mass: 2,224.9 kg (4,905 lb)
- Dimensions: 17.3 × 14.2 m (57 × 47 ft)
- Power: 1700 watts

Start of mission
- Launch date: 29 September 1988, 15:37:00 UTC
- Rocket: Space Shuttle Discovery; STS-26 / IUS
- Launch site: Kennedy Space Center LC-39B
- Contractor: Rockwell International

Orbital parameters
- Reference system: Geocentric orbit
- Regime: Geostationary orbit
- Longitude: 151° West (1988); 171° West (1988–1990); 174° West (1990–1991); 62° West (1991–1994); 171° West (1994–1995); 85° East (1995–2009); 49° West (2009–)
- Epoch: 29 September 1988

TDRS-3, known before launch as TDRS-C, is a first-generation American communications satellite, which is operated by NASA as part of the Tracking and Data Relay Satellite System. It was constructed by TRW and is based on a custom satellite bus, which was used for all seven first-generation TDRS satellites.

== Launch ==
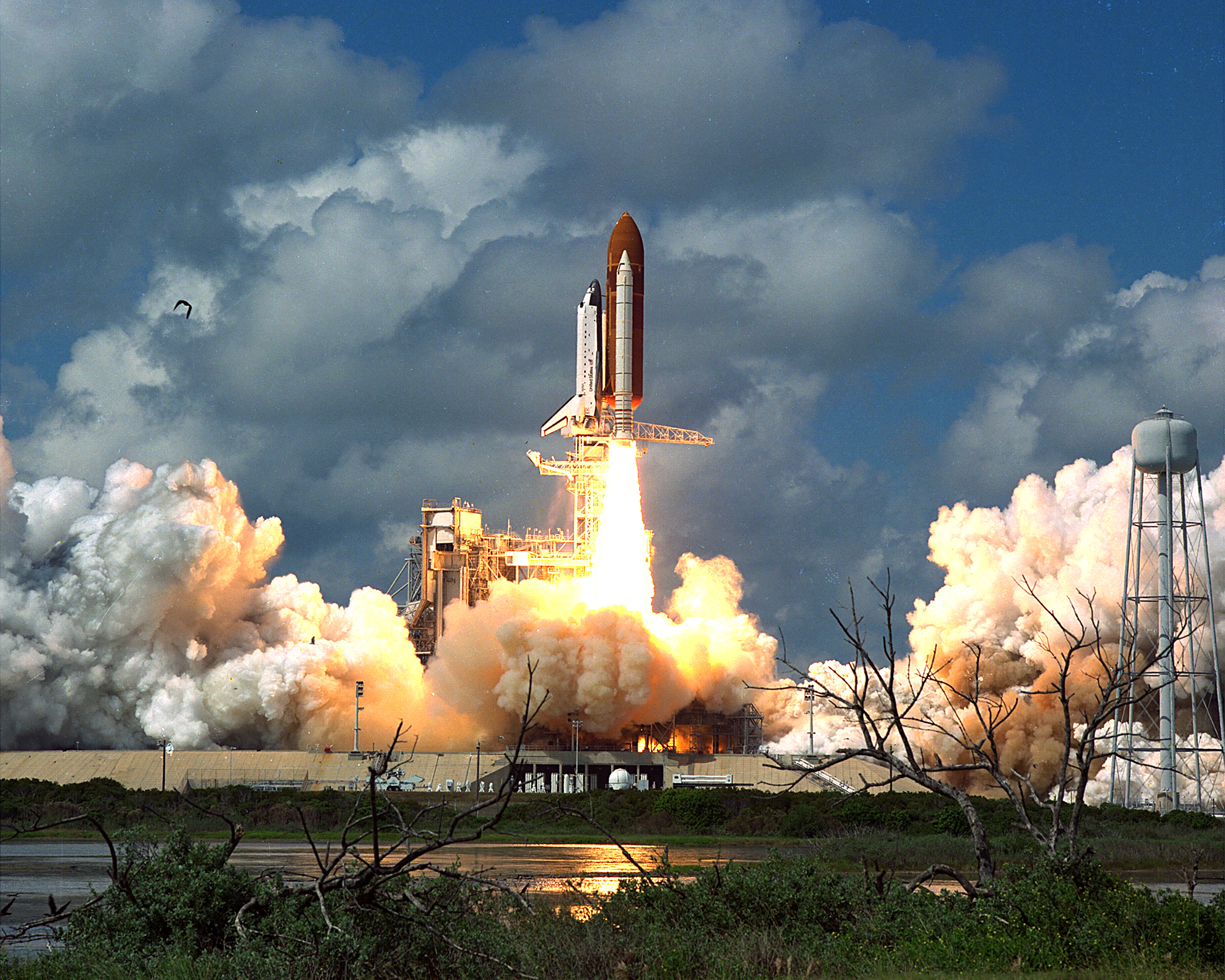
The launch of STS-26, carrying TDRS-C

The TDRS-C satellite was launched aboard Space Shuttle Discovery during the STS-26 mission in 1988; the first Shuttle flight since the Challenger disaster which had resulted in the loss of the previous TDRS satellite, TDRS-B. Discovery launched from Launch Complex 39B at the Kennedy Space Center at 15:37:00 UTC on 29 September 1988. TDRS-C was deployed from Discovery around six hours after launch, and was raised to geostationary orbit by means of an Inertial Upper Stage.

=== Deployment ===
The two-stage solid-propellent Inertial Upper Stage made two burns. The first stage burn occurred shortly after deployment from Discovery, and placed the satellite into a geosynchronous transfer orbit. At 04:30 UTC on 30 September 1988, it reached apogee, and the second stage fired, placing TDRS-C into geosynchronous orbit. At this point it received its operational designation. Although the TDRS-2 designation had not been assigned, TDRS-C was given the designation TDRS-3 as NASA did not want to reuse the designation which had been intended for the STS-51-L payload. It was briefly placed at a longitude 151° West of the Greenwich Meridian, before being moved to 171.0° West before the end of 1988, from where it provided communications services to spacecraft in Earth orbit, including Space Shuttles. In 1990, it was relocated to 174.0° West, and again in 1991 to 62.0° West. In 1994, it returned to 171.0° West. In June 1995, it was moved to 85.0° East, from where it was used primarily for communications with spacecraft such as the Compton Gamma Ray Observatory and the Hubble Space Telescope. In October 2009, as NASA began decommissioning TDRS-1, TDRS-3 was moved to 49.0° West, where it remains in storage as of 2020.

Location of TDRS as of 26 May 2020

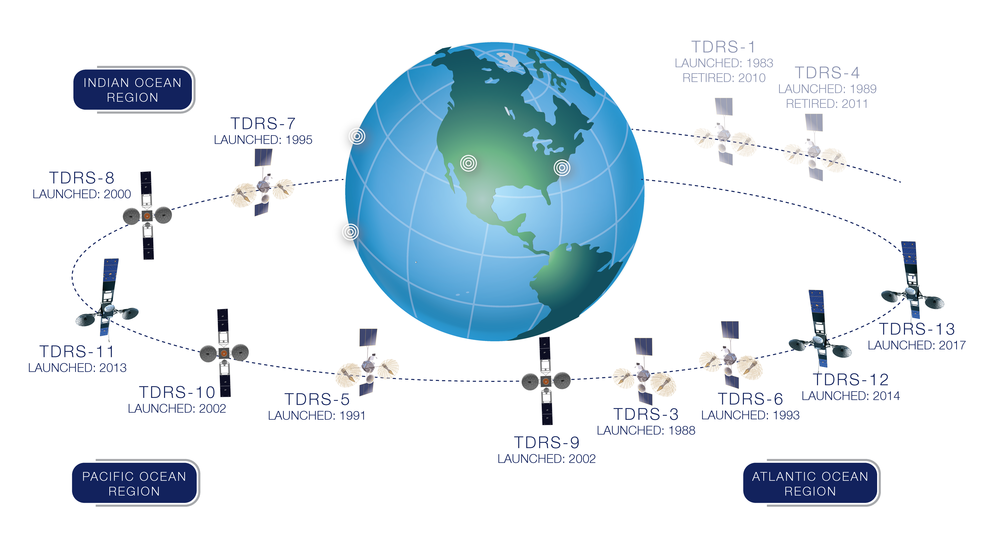
Location of TDRS as of 18 March 2019

== See also ==
- List of TDRS satellites
