= USA-130 =

American early warning satellite

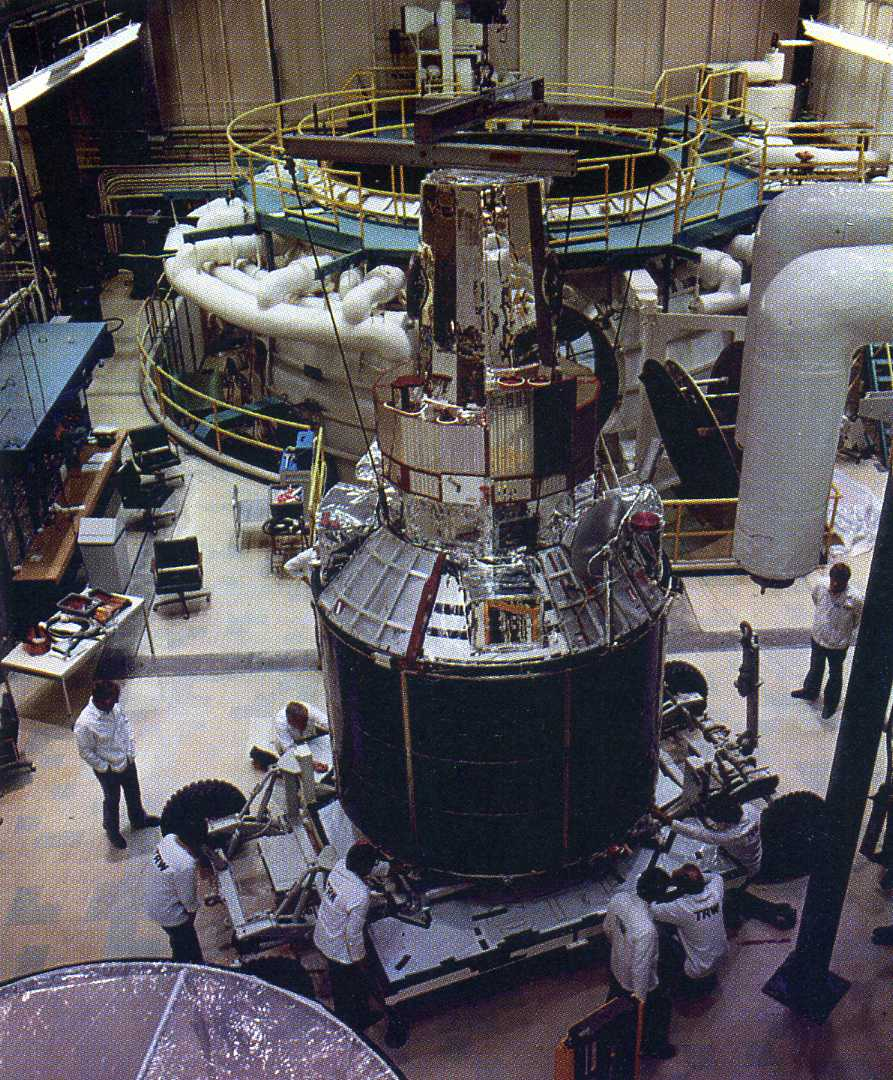
- A DSP Satellite similar to USA-130
- Mission type: Military
- Operator: Defense Support Program
- COSPAR ID: 1997-008A
- SATCAT no.: 24737

Spacecraft properties
- Manufacturer: Northrop Grumman
- Dry mass: 2,380 kg (5,250 lb)
- Power: Solar panels

Start of mission
- Launch date: February 24, 1997, 20:20 UTC
- Rocket: Titan 4B
- Launch site: Cape Canaveral

Orbital parameters
- Semi-major axis: 42,165 km (26,200 mi)
- Perigee altitude: 35,778.5 km (22,231.7 mi)
- Apogee altitude: 35,810.0 km (22,251.3 mi)
- Inclination: 13.1°
- Period: 1436.1 minutes

USA-130 is an American reconnaissance satellite that was launched in 1997. It was a DSP-I block 5 missile detection satellite run by the Defense Support Program. It is currently out of service.
