= TDRS-1 =

American communications satellite

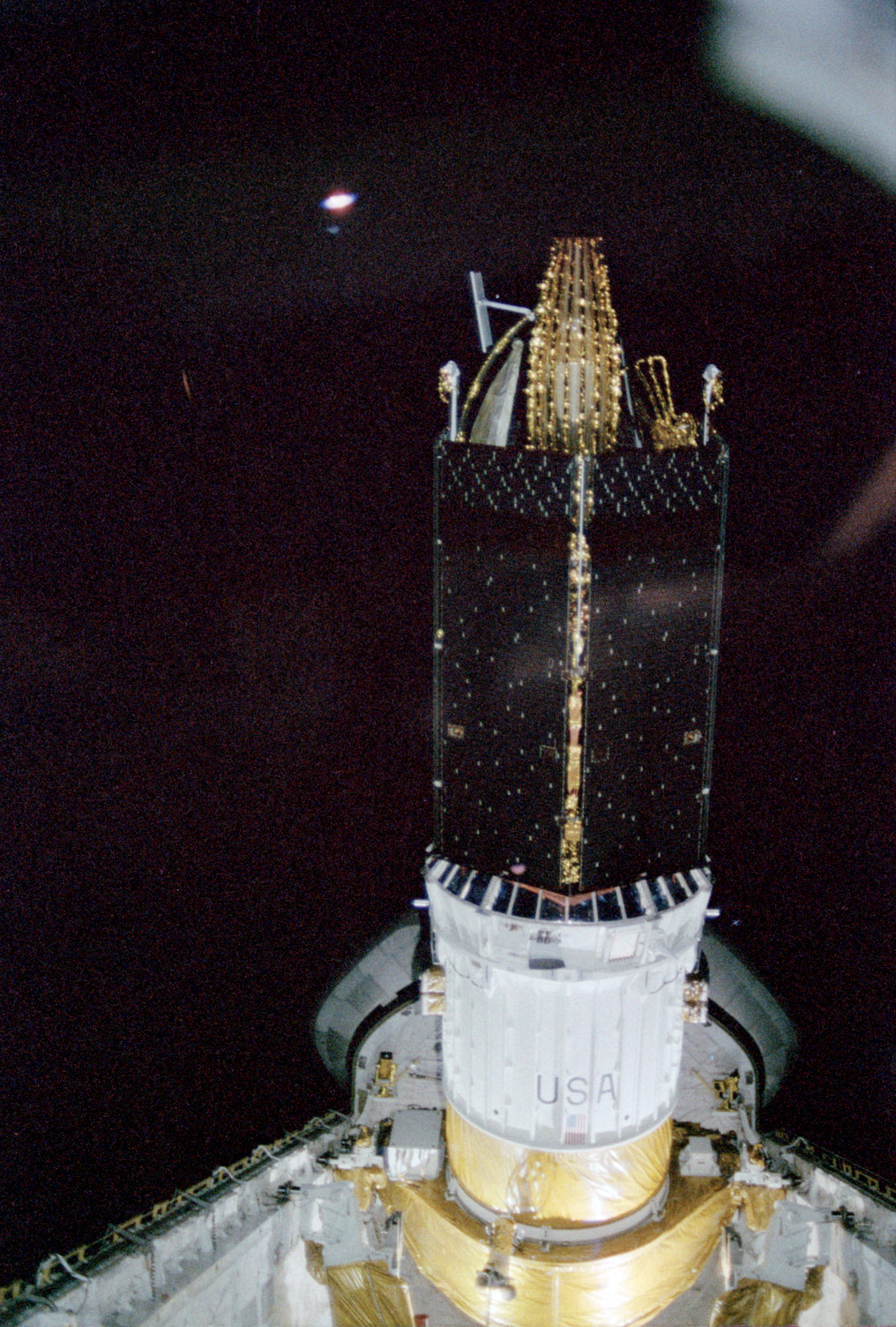
- TDRS-1 and its IUS aboard Challenger shortly before deployment.
- Mission type: Communication
- Operator: NASA
- COSPAR ID: 1983-026B
- SATCAT no.: 13969
- Mission duration: Planned: 10 years Final: 26 years, 6 months, 16 days

Spacecraft properties
- Bus: TDRS
- Manufacturer: TRW
- Launch mass: 2,268 kg (5,000 lb)
- Dimensions: 17.4 × 12.9 m (57 × 42 ft)
- Power: 1700 watts

Start of mission
- Launch date: 4 April 1983, 18:30:00; 43 years ago UTC
- Rocket: Space Shuttle Challenger; STS-6 / IUS
- Launch site: Kennedy Space Center, LC-39A
- Contractor: Rockwell International

End of mission
- Disposal: Retired to graveyard
- Declared: 21 October 2009
- Deactivated: 28 June 2010

Orbital parameters
- Reference system: Geocentric orbit
- Regime: Geostationary orbit
- Epoch: 1 April 1984

TDRS-1, known before launch as TDRS-A, was an American communications satellite, operated by NASA as part of the Tracking and Data Relay Satellite System. It was constructed by TRW and launched by Space Shuttle Challenger on its maiden flight, STS-6.

== History ==
While on the pad, problems were detected with Challenger main engines and repairs began. During this time, a severe storm contaminated TDRS-1 while it was in the Payload Change-out Room on the Rotating Service Structure at the launch pad. The satellite had to be returned to its checkout facility, where it was cleaned and rechecked. Challenger finally lifted off from Launch Complex 39A of the Kennedy Space Center at 18:30:00 UTC on 4 April 1983.

=== Operations ===
Following deployment from Challenger, TDRS-1 was to be raised to its operational geosynchronous orbit by means of an Inertial Upper Stage having two solid rocket motors, the first used to raise the orbital apogee, the second its perigee. The first burn was successful, but the Inertial Upper Stage went out of control during the second burn. TDRS-1 separated from the upper stage in a lower than planned orbit. It was eventually raised to geosynchronous orbit using its attitude control system. To achieve this, a team of engineers from the Goddard Space Flight Center in Greenbelt, Maryland worked for nearly three months using six one-pound thrusters on the errant satellite to push it 8,600 miles (13,800 km) higher in space. The failure was later identified as a collapsed second-stage nozzle techroll seal, a flexible ring which allows the nozzle to pivot and provide directional control. The Goddard engineers' successful effort required 39 adjustment burns to correct the elliptical orbit to the 22,300 mi (35,900 km) geosynchronous orbit desired for TDRS-1. Goddard Space Flight Center on 26 November 1984 honored a group of 34 individuals for the rescue with the Robert H. Goddard Award of Merit, the highest level of recognition the Goddard Space Flight Center can bestow on its employees. In 1989 satellite operations were affected by a geomagnetic storm.

TDRS-1 formed part of the first pole-to-pole phone call on 28 April 1999, with TDRS-1 being used at the South Pole, and an Iridium phone being used at the North Pole (recorded in Ripley's Believe It Or Not and Guinness World Records in April 1999).

=== Mission duration ===
TDRS-1 had a design life of ten years, but in April 2008, it remained operational on the twenty-fifth anniversary of its launch. Over the years, the orbital inclination was allowed to increase so that, for portions of the day (approximately 5 hours), it could be used for communications with the North and then the South Pole. Along with Marisat F2, GOES 3 and LES-9, it was one of a number of satellites that were transferred to the US National Science Foundation in 1998, for communications with the Amundsen–Scott South Pole Station. After Marisat was retired, TDRS-1 became the primary means of communication with the research station. The last functioning traveling-wave tube amplifier aboard TDRS-1 failed in October 2009, rendering the spacecraft unusable for communications.

1983 NASA documentary of the Space Shuttle Challenger first maiden flight and the deployment of the TDRS-1 satellite.

TDRS-1 proved helpful during a 1999 medical emergency at the NSF's Antarctic Amundsen–Scott South Pole Station. The satellite's high-speed Internet connectivity allowed personnel to conduct telemedicine conferences. Doctors in the United States aided Dr. Jerri Nielsen, who had breast cancer, to perform a self-biopsy and administer chemotherapy. Later, in 2002, doctors used TDRS-1 to perform another telemedicine conference with the station to assist in knee surgery for a meteorologist.

Because of its orbit, the satellite was able to link the North and South Poles and relayed the first pole-to-pole phone call. TDRS-1 also transmitted the first internet connection and live webcast from the North Pole and supported the first global television from the South Pole Station - a worldwide television broadcast to commemorate the beginning of the year 2000.

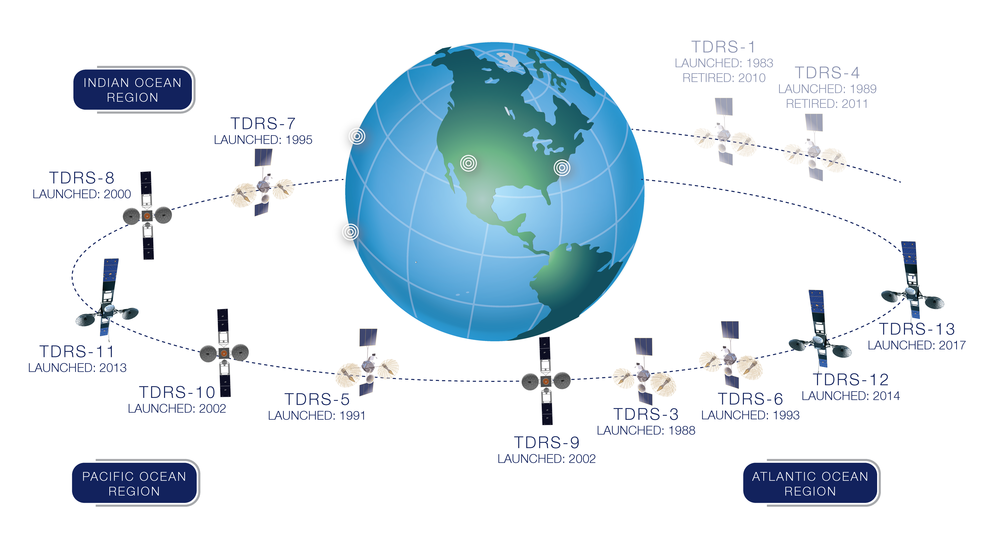
Location of TDRS as of 18 March 2019

=== Decommissioned ===
The spacecraft was retired on or about 21 October 2009, after 26 years. Decommissioning was started on 5 June 2010 and passivation completed on 27 June 2010. As of 2009, NASA repositioned TDRS-3 to assume the duties of TDRS-1.

== See also ==
- List of TDRS satellites
