= Inertial Upper Stage =

American space launch system

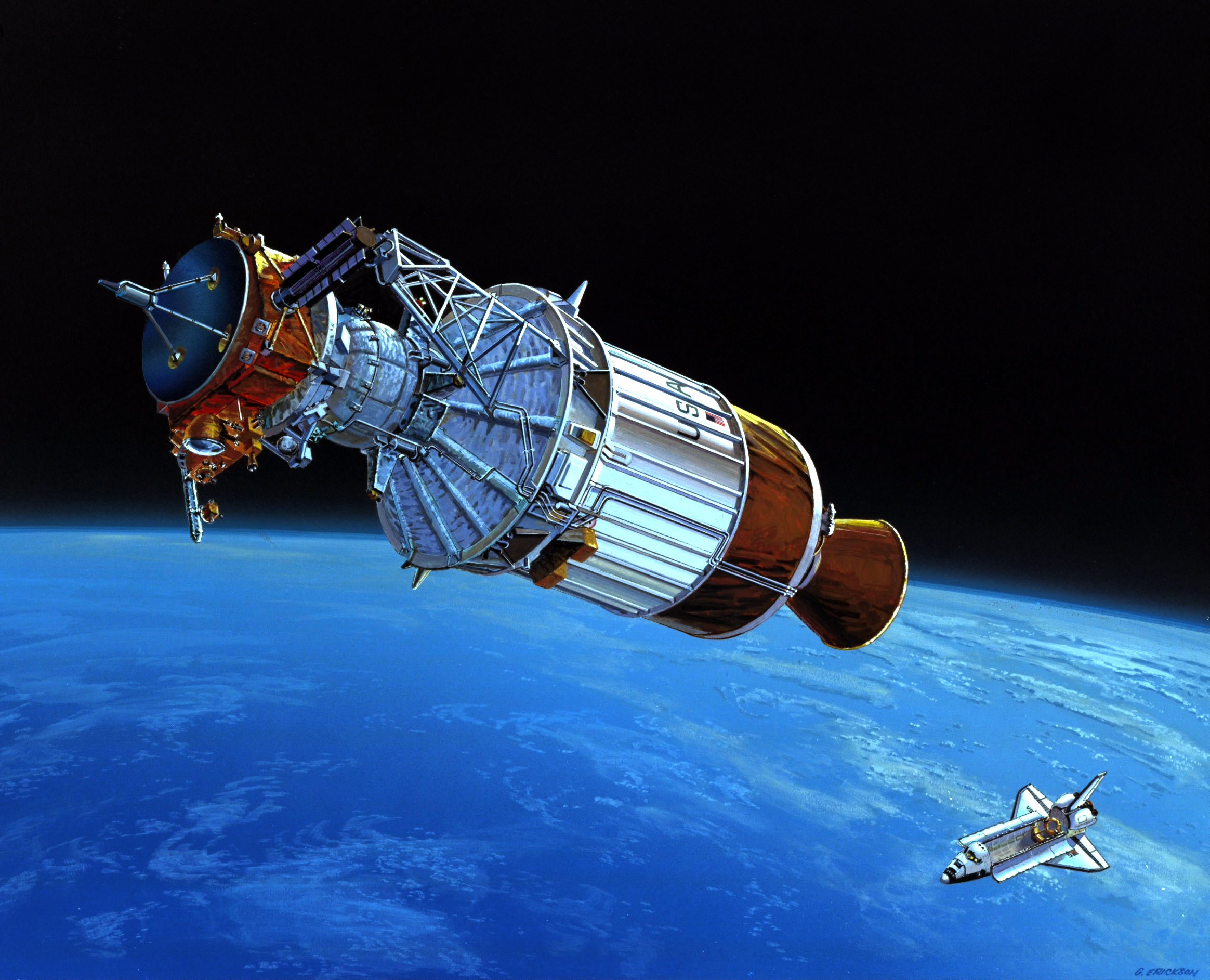
- Painting of Ulysses deploying from the Space Shuttle
- Manufacturer: Boeing; United Technologies
- Country of origin: United States
- Used on: Space Shuttle; Titan 34D; Titan IV

General characteristics
- Height: 5.2 m (17 ft)
- Diameter: 2.8 m (9 ft 2 in)
- Gross mass: 14,700 kg (32,400 lb)

Associated stages
- Derivatives: TOS

Launch history
- Status: Retired
- Total launches: 24
- Successes (stage only): 21
- Failed: 2
- Lower stage failed: 1
- First flight: 30 October 1982
- Last flight: 14 February 2004

First stage
- Height: 3.15 m (10.3 ft)
- Diameter: 2.34 m (7 ft 8 in)
- Gross mass: 10,400 kg (22,900 lb)
- Propellant mass: 9,700 kg (21,400 lb)
- Powered by: Orbus-21
- Maximum thrust: 190 kN (43,000 lb_{f})
- Specific impulse: 295.5 s (2.898 km/s)
- Burn time: up to 150 seconds
- Propellant: Solid

Second stage
- Height: 1.98 m (6 ft 6 in)
- Diameter: 1.60 m (5 ft 3 in)
- Gross mass: 3,000 kg (6,600 lb)
- Propellant mass: 2,700 kg (6,000 lb)
- Powered by: Orbus-6
- Maximum thrust: 80 kN (18,000 lb_{f})
- Specific impulse: 289.1 s (2.835 km/s)
- Propellant: Solid

The Inertial Upper Stage (IUS), originally designated the Interim Upper Stage, was a two-stage, solid-fueled space launch system developed by Boeing for the United States Air Force beginning in 1976 for raising payloads from low Earth orbit to higher orbits or interplanetary trajectories following launch aboard a Titan 34D or Titan IV rocket as its upper stage, or from the payload bay of the Space Shuttle as a space tug.

== Development ==
During the development of the Space Shuttle, NASA, with support from the Air Force, wanted an upper stage that could be used on the Shuttle to deliver payloads from low earth orbit to higher energy orbits such as GTO or GEO or to escape velocity for planetary probes. The candidates were the Centaur, propelled by liquid hydrogen and liquid oxygen, the Transtage, propelled by hypergolic storable propellants Aerozine-50 and dinitrogen tetroxide (N_{2}O_{4}), and the Interim Upper Stage, using solid propellant. The US Department of Defense (DoD) reported that Transtage could support all defense needs but could not meet NASA's scientific requirements. The IUS could support most defense needs and some science missions, while the Centaur could meet all needs of both the Air Force and NASA. Development began on both the Centaur and the IUS, and a second stage was added to the IUS design which could be used either as an apogee kick motor for inserting payloads directly into geostationary orbit or to increase the payload mass brought to escape velocity.

Boeing was the primary contractor for the IUS while Chemical Systems Division of United Technologies built the IUS solid rocket motors.

When launched from the Space Shuttle, the IUS could deliver up to 2,270 kilograms (5,000 lb) directly to GEO or up to 4,940 kilograms (10,890 lb) to GTO.

The first launch of the IUS was in 1982 on a Titan 34D rocket from the Cape Canaveral Air Force Station shortly before the STS-6 Space Shuttle mission.

Development of the Shuttle-Centaur was halted after the Challenger disaster, and the Interim Upper Stage became the Inertial Upper Stage.

== Design ==
The solid rocket motor on both stages had a steerable nozzle for thrust vectoring. The second stage had hydrazine reaction control jets for attitude control whilst coasting, and for separation from payload. Depending on mission, one, two or three 54 kg (120 lb) tanks of hydrazine could be fitted.

== Applications ==
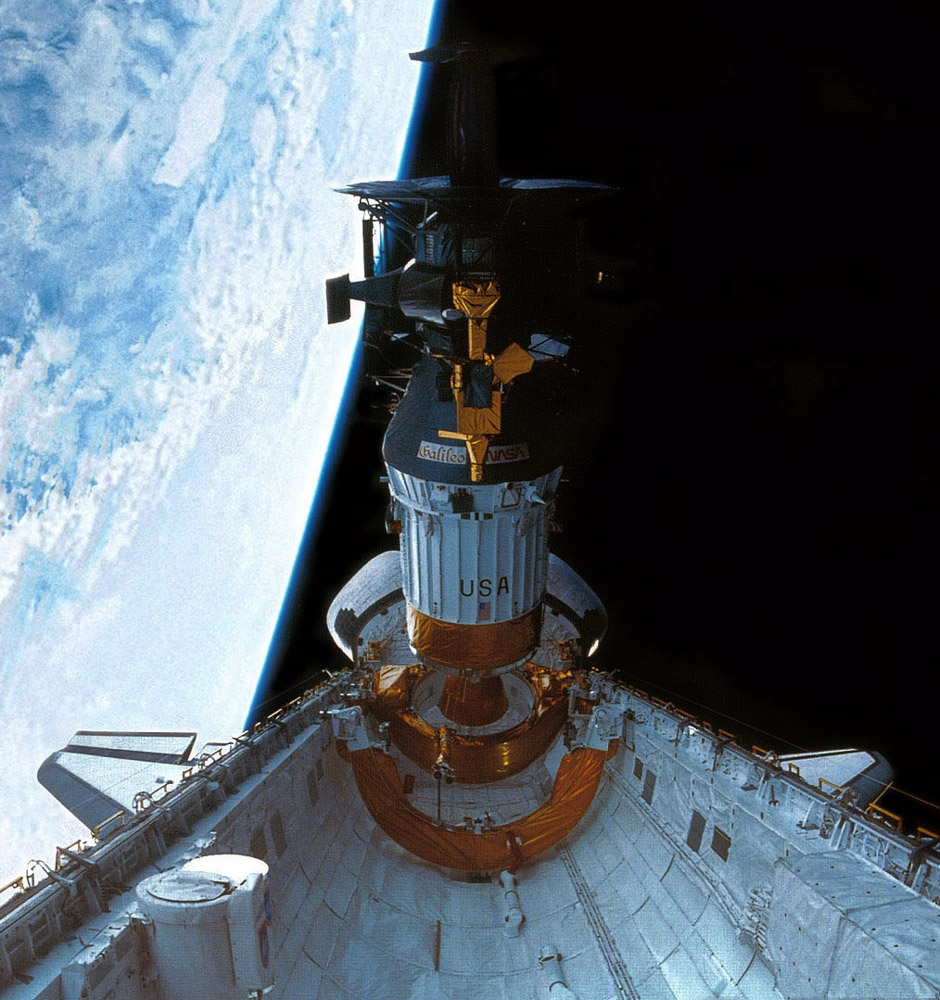
The Galileo spacecraft and its attached Inertial Upper Stage (IUS) booster being deployed after being launched by the Space Shuttle Atlantis on the STS-34 mission

On Titan launches, the Titan booster would launch the IUS, carrying the payload into low Earth orbit where it was separated from the Titan and ignited its first stage, which carried it into an elliptical "transfer" orbit to a higher altitude.

On Shuttle launches, the orbiter's payload bay was opened, the IUS and its payload raised (by the IUS Airborne Support Equipment (ASE)) to a 50-52° angle, and released. After the Shuttle separated from the payload to a safe distance, the IUS first stage ignited and, as on a Titan booster mission, entered a "transfer orbit".

Upon reaching apogee in the transfer orbit, the first stage and interstage structure were jettisoned. The second stage then fired to circularize the orbit, after which it released the satellite and, using its attitude control jets, began a retrograde maneuver to enter a lower orbit to avoid any possibility of collision with its payload.

In addition to the communication and reconnaissance missions described above, which placed the payload into stationary (24-hour) orbit, the IUS was also used to boost spacecraft towards planetary trajectories. For these missions, the second IUS stage was separated and ignited immediately after first stage burnout. Igniting the second stage at low altitude (and thus, high orbital speed) provided the extra velocity the spacecraft needed to escape from Earth orbit (see Oberth effect). IUS could not impart as much velocity to its payload as Centaur would have been able to: while Centaur could have launched Galileo directly on a two-year trip to Jupiter, the IUS required a six-year voyage with multiple gravity assists.

The final flight of the IUS occurred in February 2004.

== Flights ==
Serial number	Launch date	Launch vehicle	Payload	Remarks	Image
2	1982-10-30	Titan 34D	DSCS II F-16/III A-1	Mission successful despite telemetry loss for most of the flight.	
1	1983-04-04	Space Shuttle; Challenger (STS-6)	TDRS-A (TDRS-1)	The second stage tumbled due to a thruster motor problem, resulting in an incorrect orbit. The Boeing staff that was monitoring the flight was able to separate the tumbling IUS from the satellite so it could be maneuvered into its final orbit.	
11	1985-01-24	Space Shuttle; Discovery (STS-51-C)	USA-8 (Magnum)	Classified DoD payload	
12	1985-10-03	Space Shuttle; Atlantis (STS-51-J)	USA-11/12 (DSCS)	DoD payload. Declassified in 1998.	
3	1986-01-28	Space Shuttle; Challenger (STS-51-L)	TDRS-B	Destroyed during launch	
7	1988-09-29	Space Shuttle; Discovery (STS-26)	TDRS-C (TDRS-3)		
9	1989-03-13	Space Shuttle; Discovery (STS-29)	TDRS-D (TDRS-4)		
18	1989-05-04	Space Shuttle; Atlantis (STS-30)	Magellan	Probe to Venus. Only one tank of hydrazine.	
8	1989-06-14	Titan IV (402) A	USA-39 (DSP)		
19	1989-10-18	Space Shuttle; Atlantis (STS-34)	Galileo	Probe to Jupiter	
5	1989-11-23	Space Shuttle; Discovery (STS-33)	USA-48 (Magnum)	Classified DoD payload	
17	1990-10-06	Space Shuttle; Discovery (STS-41)	Ulysses on PAM-S	Probe to the polar regions of the Sun	
6	1990-11-13	Titan IV (402) A	USA-65 (DSP)		
15	1991-08-02	Space Shuttle; Atlantis (STS-43)	TDRS-E (TDRS-5)		
14	1991-11-24	Space Shuttle; Atlantis (STS-44)	USA-75 (DSP)		
13	1993-01-13	Space Shuttle; Endeavour (STS-54)	TDRS-F (TDRS-6)		
20	1994-12-22	Titan IV (402) A	USA-107 (DSP)		
26	1995-07-13	Space Shuttle; Discovery (STS-70)	TDRS-G (TDRS-7)		
4	1997-02-23	Titan IV (402) B	USA-130 (DSP)		
21	1999-04-09	Titan IV (402) B	USA-142 (DSP)	IUS first and second stages failed to separate, payload placed into useless orbit	
27	1999-07-23	Space Shuttle; Columbia (STS-93)	Chandra X-ray Observatory	Last launch of a payload using IUS on a Space Shuttle.	
22	2000-05-08	Titan IV (402) B	USA-149 (DSP)		
16	2001-08-06	Titan IV (402) B	USA-159 (DSP)		
10	2004-02-14	Titan IV (402) B	USA-176 (DSP)		

== Gallery ==
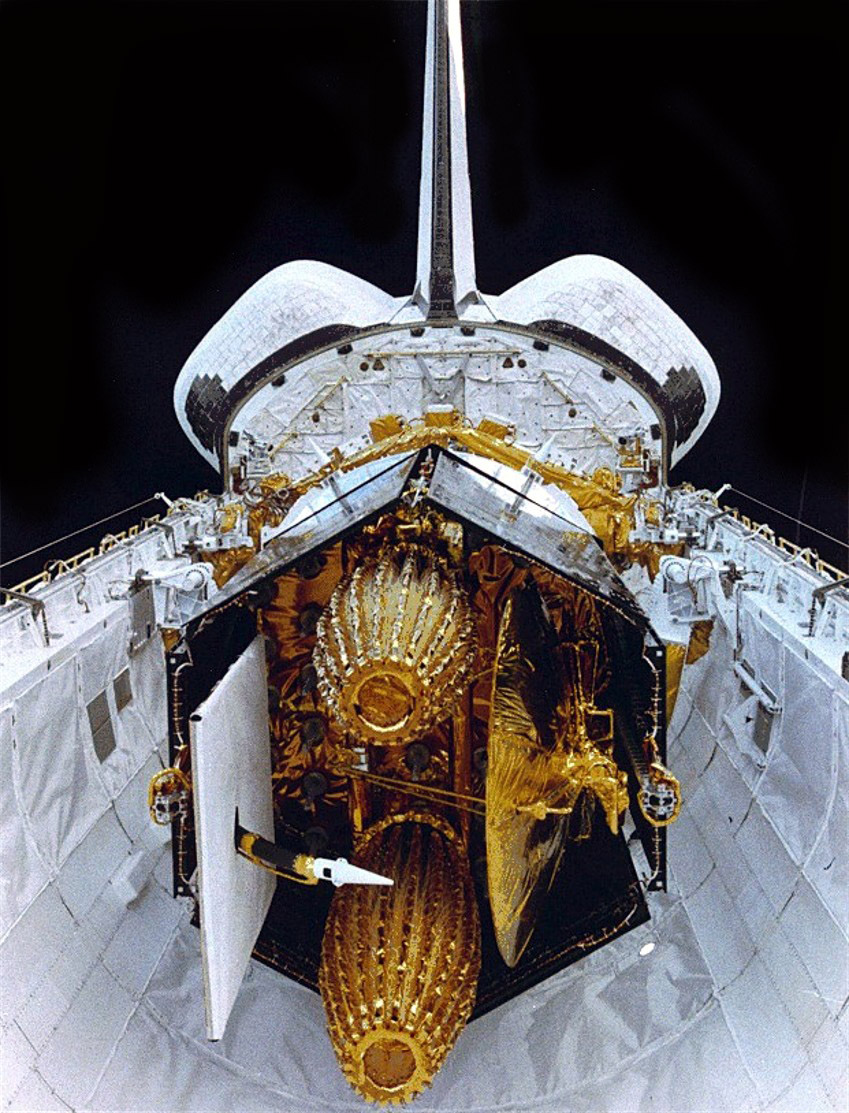
TDRS-C in Space Shuttle Discovery's payload bay

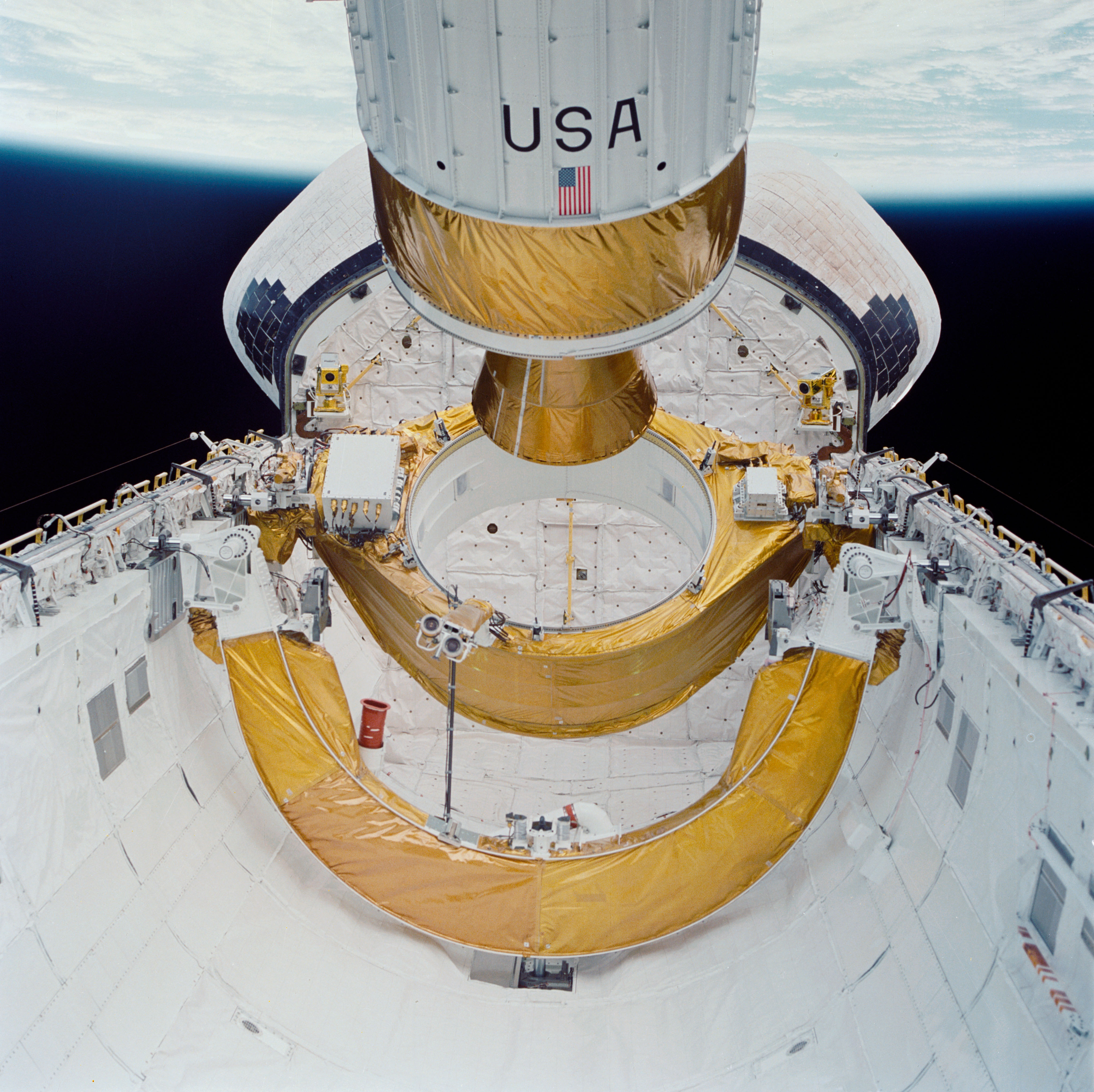
Release of TDRS-C

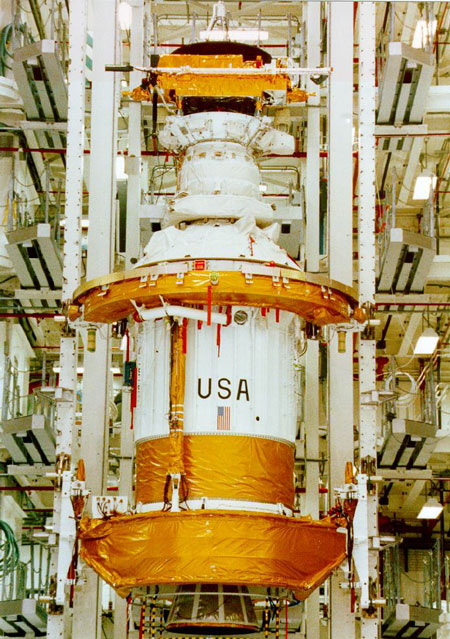
Ulysses used a PAM-S and IUS combination

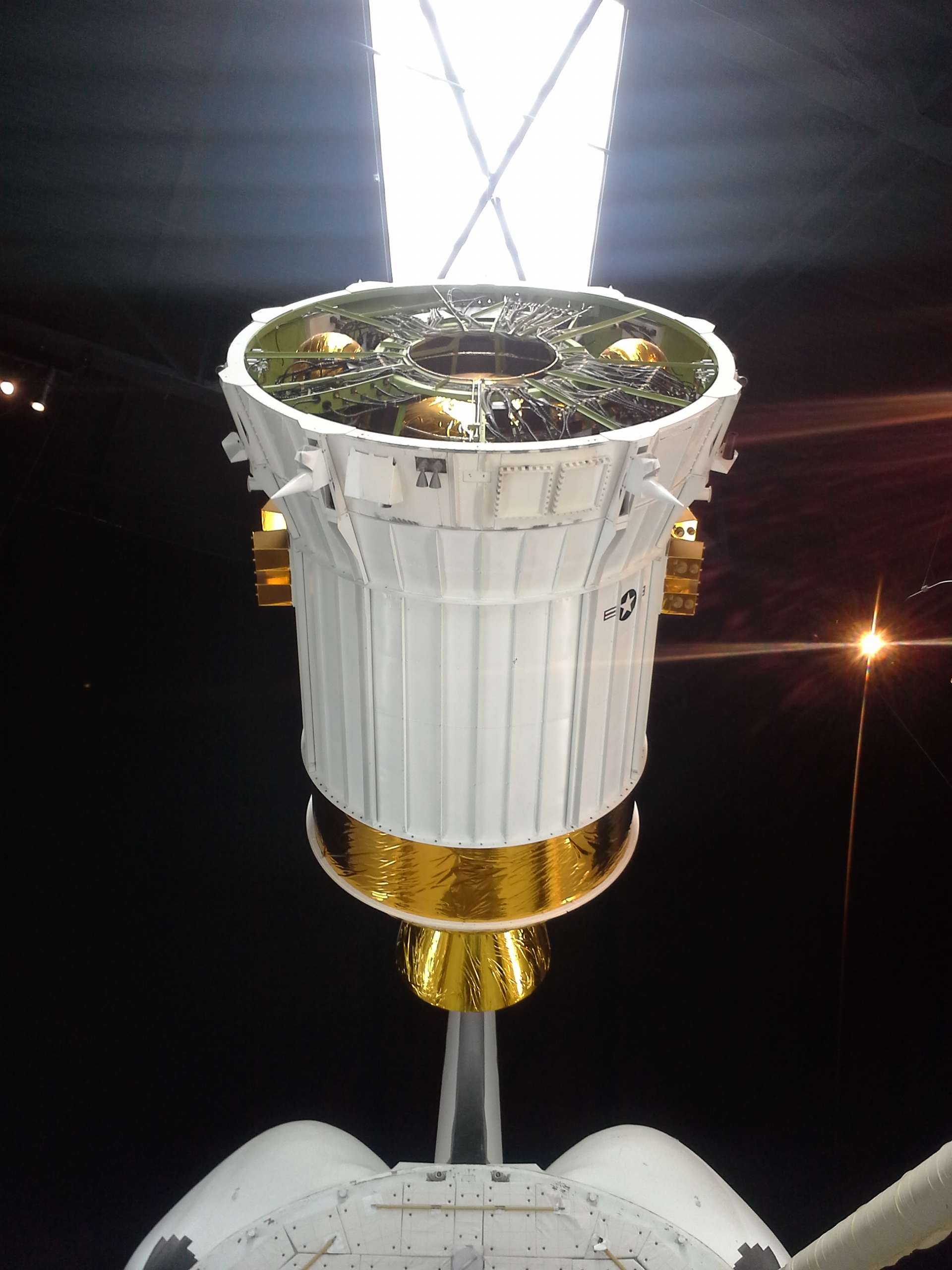
An Inertial Upper Stage at the Museum of Flight in Seattle
