= James P. Bagian =

American physician, astronaut and engineer (born 1952)

James Bagian
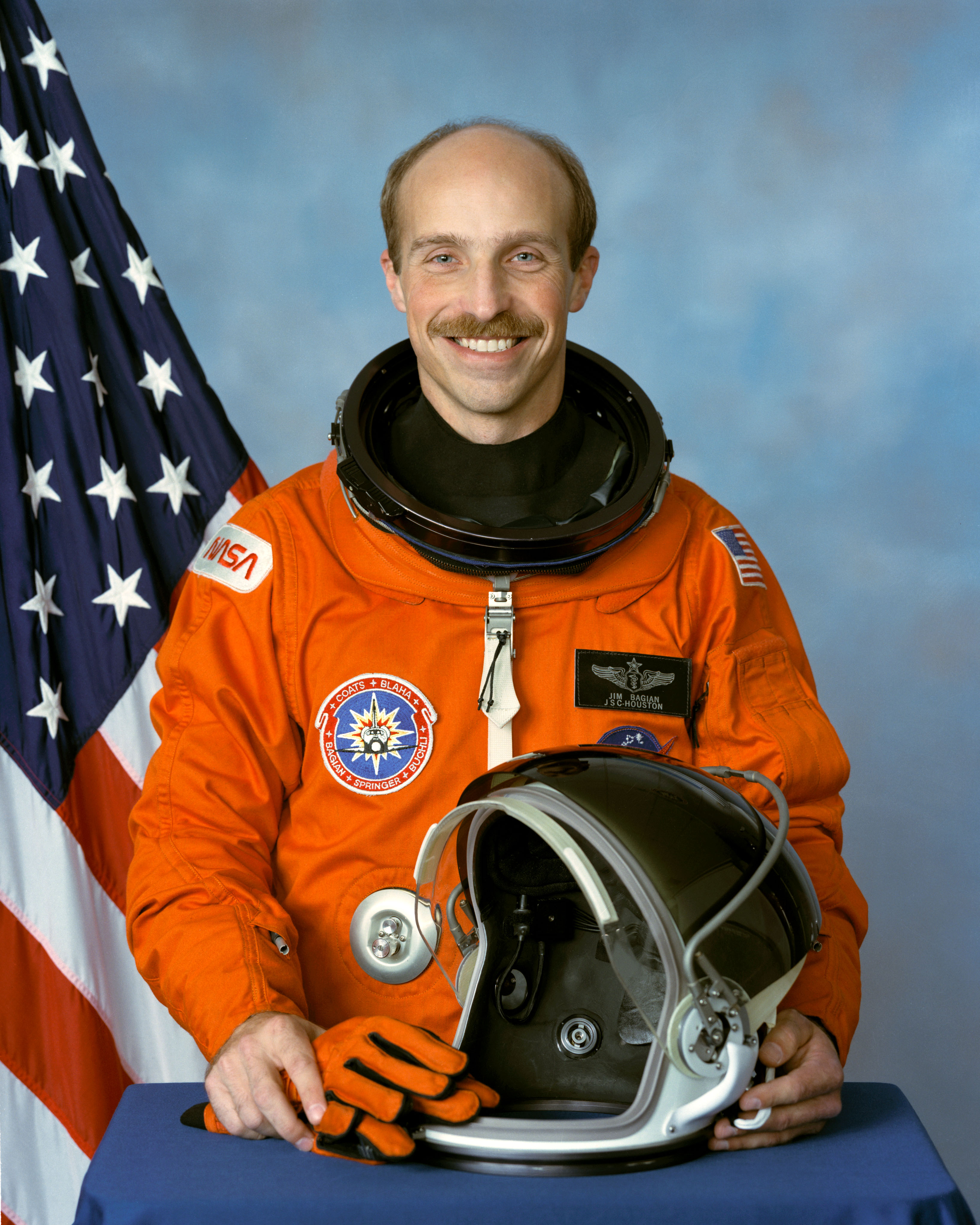
- Born: James Philip Bagian; February 22, 1952 (age 74); Philadelphia, Pennsylvania, U.S.
- Education: Drexel University (BS); Thomas Jefferson University (MD)
- Space career

NASA astronaut
- Rank: Colonel, USAF
- Time in space: 14d 1h 53m
- Selection: NASA Group 9 (1980)
- Mission: STS-29; STS-40
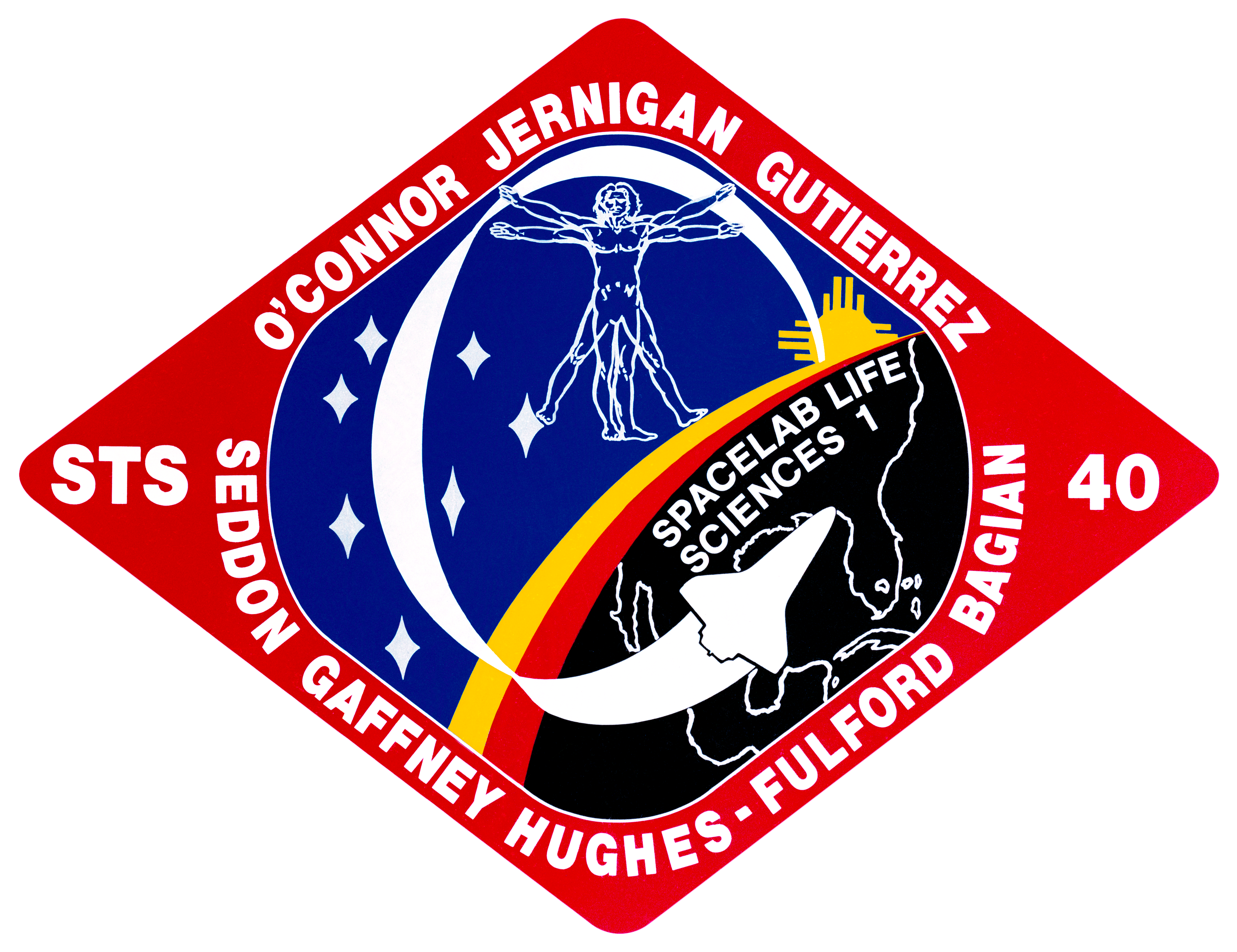
- Mission insignia

James Philip Bagian (born February 22, 1952), is an American physician, engineer, and former NASA astronaut of Armenian descent. During his career as an astronaut, he logged 337 hours of space-flight, over two missions, STS-29 (in 1989) and STS-40 (in 1991). After leaving NASA in 1995, Bagian was elected as a member of the National Academy of Medicine. He was also elected as a member of the National Academy of Engineering in 2000 for the integration of engineering and medical knowledge in applications for aerospace systems, environmental technology, and patient safety.

Bagian is currently the Director of the Center for Healthcare Engineering and Patient Safety at the University of Michigan.

Bagian is the only person of Armenian descent to have been in space.

== Education ==
Bagian graduated from Central High School in Philadelphia, Pennsylvania, in 1969; received a Bachelor of Science degree in mechanical engineering from Drexel University in 1973, graduating first in his class, and a Doctor of Medicine degree from Thomas Jefferson University in 1977, where he was a member of Alpha Omega Alpha.

== Experience ==
Bagian worked as a process engineer for the 3M Company in Bristol, Pennsylvania, in 1973, and later as a mechanical engineer at the U.S. Naval Air Test Center at Patuxent River, Maryland, from 1976 to 1978, and at the same time, pursued studies for his medical degree. Upon graduating from Thomas Jefferson University in 1977, Bagian completed one year of general surgery residency with the Geisinger Medical Center in Danville, Pennsylvania.

He subsequently went to work as a flight surgeon and research medical officer at the Lyndon B. Johnson Space Center in 1978, while concurrently completing studies at the USAF School of Aerospace Medicine in San Antonio, Texas, where he graduated first in his flight surgeons class. He was completing a residency in anesthesiology at the University of Pennsylvania when notified of his selection by NASA for the astronaut candidate program. Bagian received his Professional Engineers Certification in 1986 and was board-certified in aerospace medicine by the American College of Preventive Medicine in 1987.

Since 1981, Bagian has been active in the mountain rescue community and has served as a member of the Denali Medical Research Project on Denali. He has been a snow-and-ice rescue techniques instructor on Mount Hood during this period. Bagian is a colonel in the U.S. Air Force Reserve and is the pararescue flight surgeon for the 939th Air Rescue Wing. He is a USAF-qualified freefall parachutist, holds a private pilot's license and has logged over 1,500 hours flying time in propeller and jet aircraft, helicopters, and gliders.

== NASA experience ==
Bagian became a NASA astronaut in July 1980. He took part in both the planning and provision of emergency medical and rescue support for the first six Shuttle flights. He served as the Astronaut Office coordinator for Space Shuttle payload software and crew equipment, as well as supporting the development of a variety of payloads and participating in the verification of Space Shuttle flight software.

In 1986, Bagian served as an investigator for the 51-L accident board. He was responsible for the development program and implementation of the pressure suit used for crew escape and various other crew survival equipment to be used on future Shuttle missions, and is in charge of Shuttle search and rescue planning and implementation for the Astronaut Office. Bagian was a member of the NASA Headquarters Research Animal Holding Facility Review Board.

He has authored numerous scientific papers in the fields of human factors, environmental and aerospace medicine. A veteran of two space flights (STS-29 in 1989 and STS-40 in 1991), Bagian has logged over 337 hours in space. In 2003 Bagian served as the Chief Flight Surgeon and Medical Consultant for the Columbia Accident Investigation Board and currently serves as a member of the NASA Aerospace Safety Advisory Panel.

== STS-29 ==
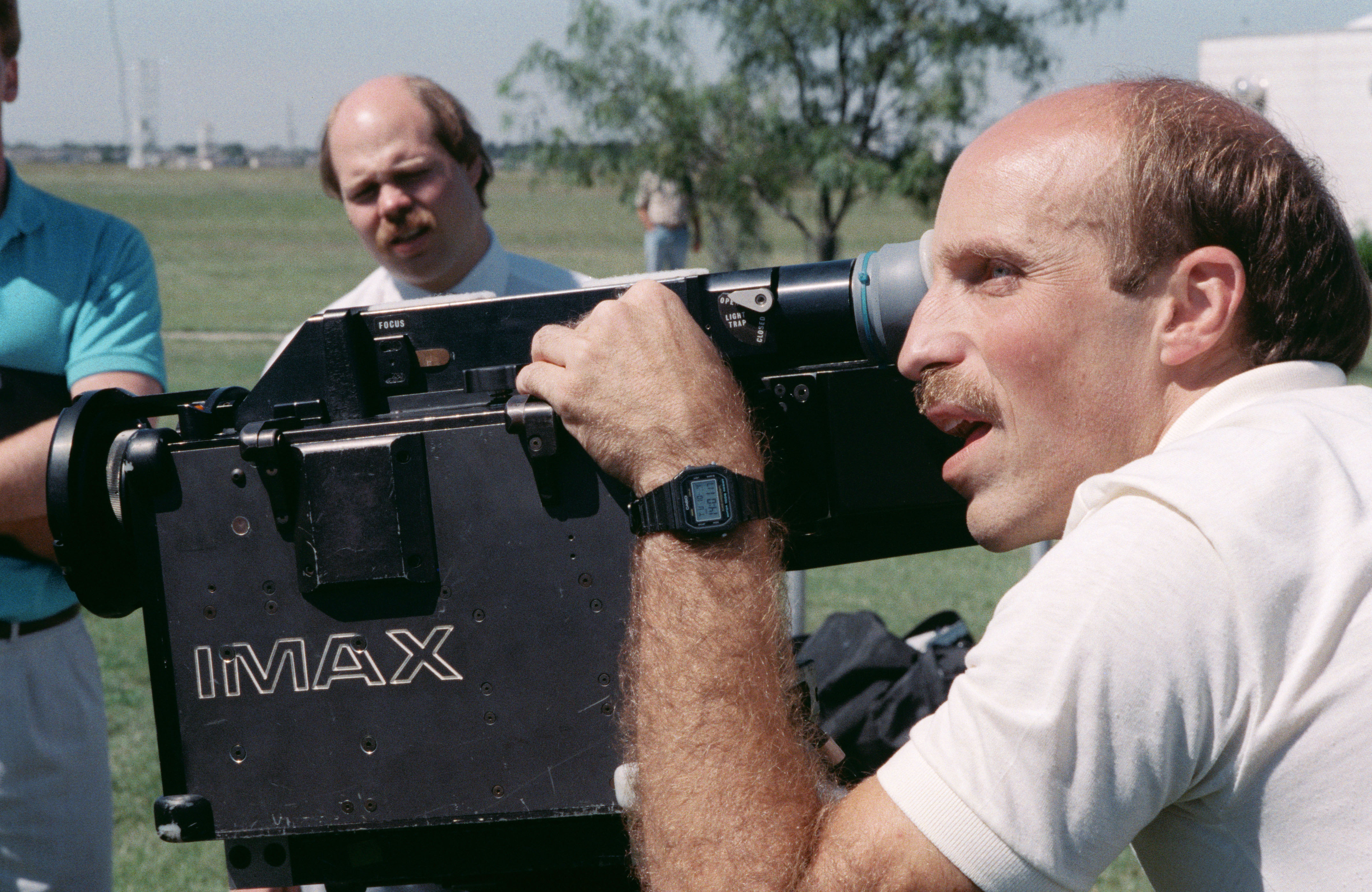
Bagian training to use the IMAX camera prior to STS-29.

Bagian first flew on the crew of STS-29, which launched from Kennedy Space Center, Florida, aboard the Orbiter Discovery, on March 13, 1989. During this highly successful five-day mission, the crew deployed a Tracking and Data Relay Satellite and performed numerous secondary experiments, including a Space Station "heat pipe" radiator experiment, two student experiments, a protein crystal growth experiment, and a chromosome and plant cell division experiment. Bagian was the principal investigator and performed Detailed Supplementary Objective 470 which described, by the use of transcranial Doppler, the changes of cerebral blood flow and its relationship to Space Adaptation Syndrome (SAS) and Space Motion Sickness (SMS).

Bagian was the first person to treat SMS with the drug Phenergan by intramuscular injection. This represented the first successful treatment regimen for SMS and has now been adopted by NASA as the standard of care for the control of SMS in Shuttle crews and is routinely used. In addition, the crew took over 3,000 photographs of the Earth using several types of cameras, including the IMAX 70 mm movie camera. Mission duration was 80 orbits and concluded with a landing at Edwards Air Force Base, California, on March 18, 1989. With the completion of this mission, he logged over 119 hours in space.

== STS-40 ==
Printing plate flown on STS-40 by Bagian

Bagian served as the Lead Mission Specialist on the crew of STS-40 Spacelab Life Sciences, the first dedicated space and life sciences mission, which launched from the Kennedy Space Center, Florida, on June 5, 1991. SLS-1 was a nine-day mission during which crew members performed experiments that explored how the heart, blood vessels, lungs, kidneys, and hormone-secreting glands respond to microgravity, the causes of space sickness, and changes in muscles, bones, and cells which occur in humans during space flight.

Other payloads included experiments designed to investigate materials science, plant biology and cosmic radiation. In addition to the scheduled payload activities on STS-40, Bagian was successful in personally devising and implementing repair procedures for malfunctioning experiment hardware which allowed all scheduled scientific objectives to be successfully accomplished.

On this flight, astronaut James Bagian performed was the first magic trick performed in space. Before launch, he secured permission from the STS-40 Flight Director and Director of Flight Operations to perform the first magic trick in space and link it real-time via television to Mission Control. Bagian also left pre-flight instructions with the Mission Control Capsule Communicator (CAPCOM), Marsha Ivins, to purchase a standard deck of playing cards and leave the cards unopened to be used on his instructions when he was on orbit and performing the illusion. Bagian brought a second, identical deck with him aboard the shuttle. He claimed to have chosen one card from his onboard deck of cards and placed it facing the opposite direction before liftoff. During the mission, Mission Control Communicator Marsha Ivins, on live TV, opened the sealed deck, shuffled it, and randomly selected a card. Bagian then revealed his deck, where one card was reversed. Pilot Sidney Gutierrez pulled out the reversed card—revealing it to be the exact same card Marsha had selected on Earth.

Following 146 orbits of the Earth, Columbia and her crew landed at Edwards Air Force Base, California, on June 14, 1991.

Completion of this flight logged him an additional 218 hours in space.

== Post-NASA ==
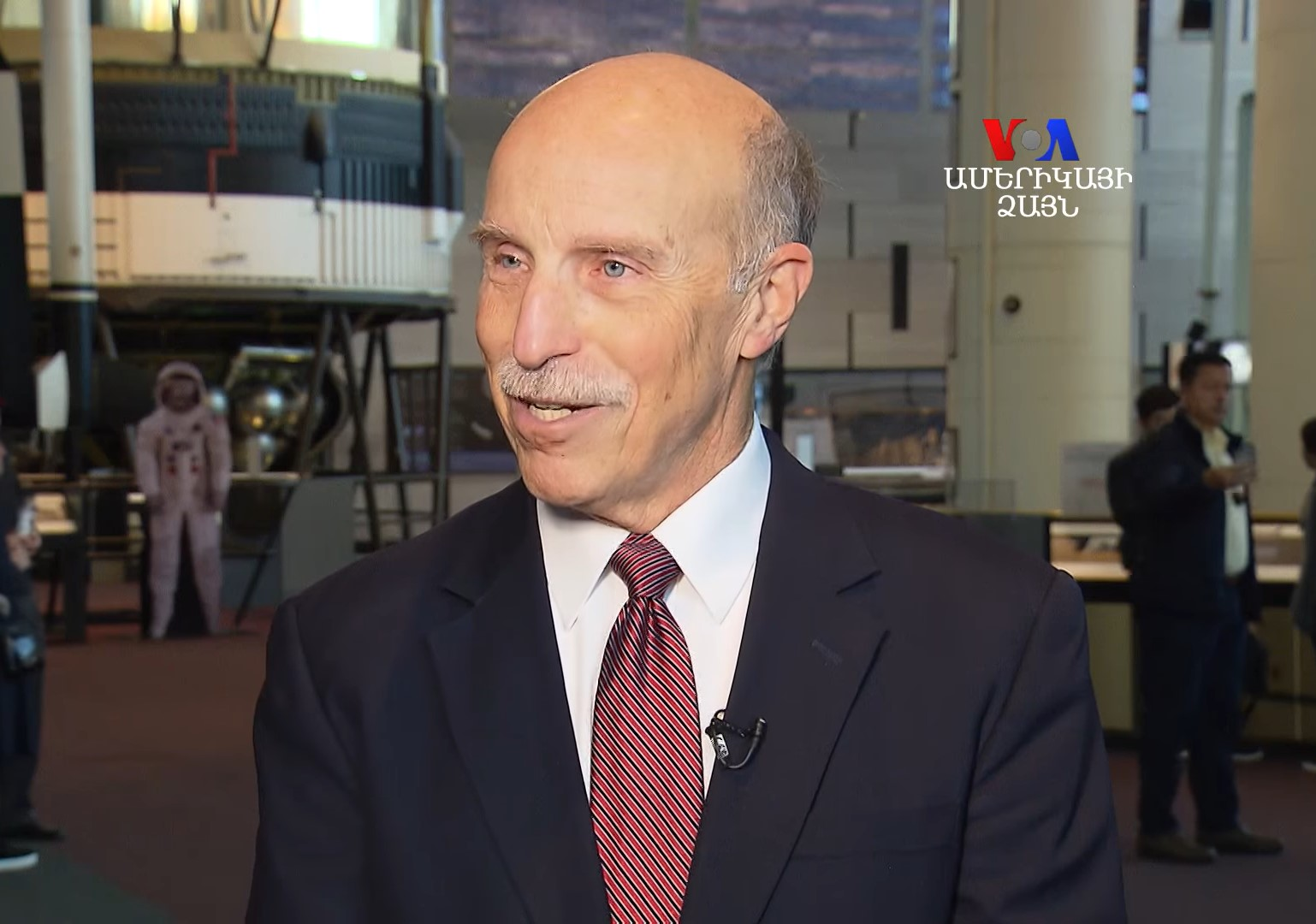
Bagian in 2017

Bagian left NASA in 1995. He was elected to membership in the National Academy of Engineering and the Institute of Medicine. Bagian was the Veterans Health Administration (VHA) Chief Patient Safety Officer, and Director of the VA National Center for Patient Safety.

Bagian was the first and founding director of the VA National Center for Patient Safety and as the Department of Veterans Affairs first Chief Patient Safety Officer where he developed numerous patient safety related tools and programs that have been adopted nationally and internationally.

Bagian is currently the Director of the Center for Healthcare Engineering and Patient Safety at the University of Michigan and is currently a professor at the University of Michigan with appointments in the Department of Anesthesia and the College of Engineering.

Bagian participated in the 2022 Starmus Festival held in Yerevan, Armenia in September 2022.

== Organizations ==
Bagian is a member of multiple organizations:

- Aerospace Medicine Association
- College of Emergency Physicians
- American Society of Mechanical Engineers
- National Academy of Engineering
- Society of NASA Flight Surgeons (Lifetime membership)
- Phi Kappa Phi
- Phi Eta Sigma
- Pi Tau Sigma
- Tau Beta Pi
- Alpha Omega Alpha

== Special honors ==
- U.S. Army ROTC Superior Cadet Award (1970)
- Graduated first in class from Drexel University (1973)
- Orthopedics Prize from Jefferson University (1977)
- Honor Graduate (first in class) from USAF Flight Surgeons School (1979)
- Federation Aeronautique Internationale (FAI) Komarov Diploma (1989)
- Sikorsky Helicopter Rescue Award (1990)
- NASA Achievement Award for developing treatment of space motion sickness (1991)
- NASA Space Flight Award (1989 and 1991)
- NASA Exceptional Service Medal (1992)
- Society of NASA Flight Surgeons W. Randolf Lovelace Award for "Significant contribution to the practice and advancement of aerospace medicine". (1992)
- American Astronautical Society's Melbourne W. Boynton Award for "Outstanding contributions to the biomedical aspects of space flight". (1992)
- Eagle Scout, Boy Scouts of America
- Distinguished Eagle Scout, Boy Scouts of America (2011)
