= Robert C. Springer =

American test pilot and astronaut (born 1942)

Bob Springer
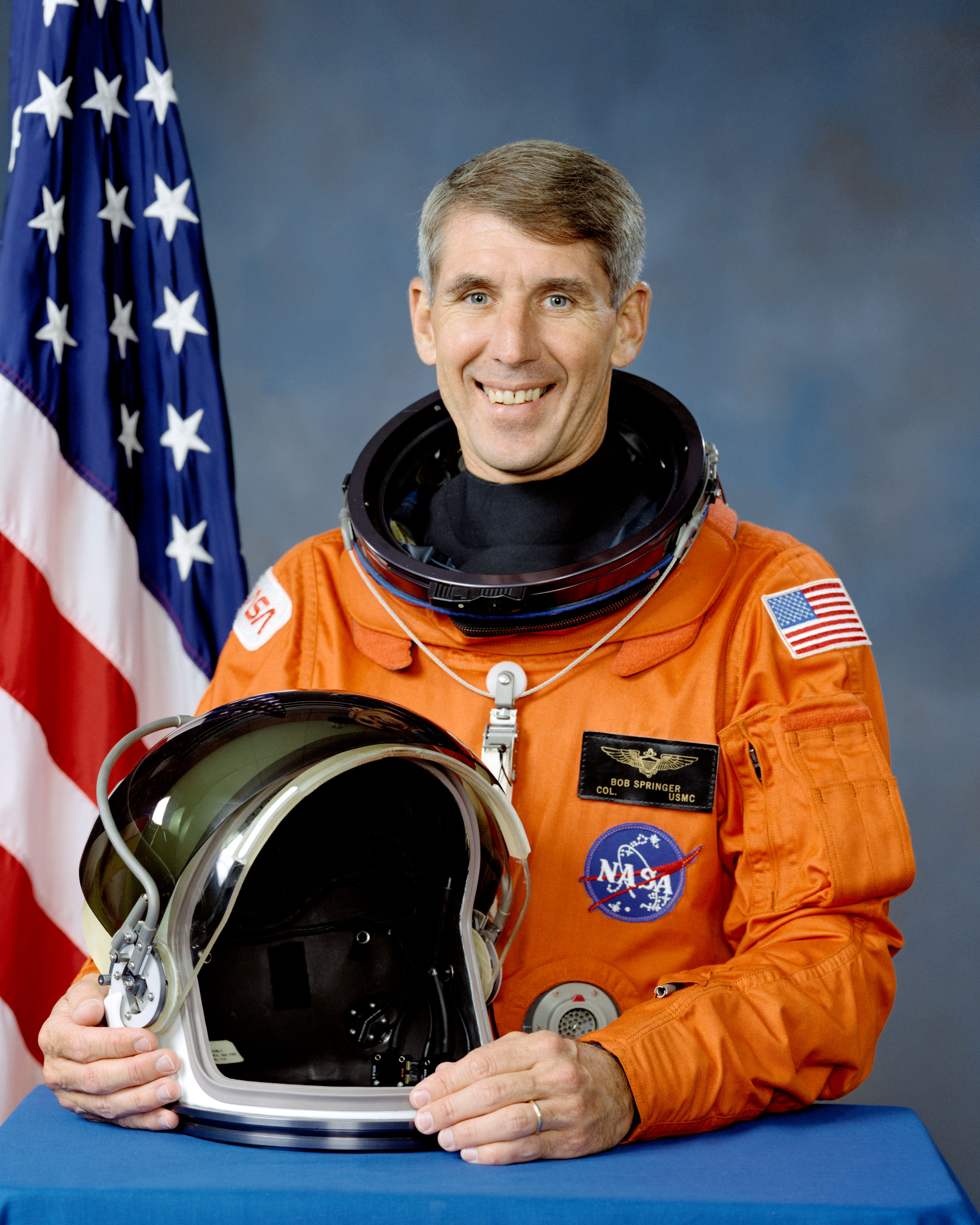
- Born: Robert Clyde Springer; May 21, 1942 (age 84); St. Louis, Missouri, U.S.
- Education: United States Naval Academy (BS); Naval Postgraduate School (MS)
- Space career

NASA astronaut
- Rank: Colonel, USMC
- Time in space: 9d 21h 32m
- Selection: NASA Group 9 (1980)
- Mission: STS-29; STS-38

Robert Clyde Springer (born May 21, 1942) is a retired American astronaut and test pilot who flew as a mission specialist on two NASA Space Shuttle missions in 1989 and 1990. A decorated aviator in the United States Marine Corps, Springer also flew more than 500 combat sorties during the Vietnam War. He has logged over 237 hours in space and 4,500 hours flying time, including 3,500 hours in jet aircraft.

== Pre-spaceflight experience ==
Springer was born May 21, 1942, in St. Louis, Missouri. He was active in the Boy Scouts of America where he achieved its second-highest rank, Life Scout. He graduated from Ashland High School in Ashland, Ohio in 1960. He received a commission in the U.S. Marine Corps following his 1964 graduation from the United States Naval Academy in Annapolis, Maryland with a Bachelor of Science degree in Naval Science. Springer attended The Basic School at Marine Corps Base Quantico, Virginia before reporting to the Naval Air Training Command for flight training at Pensacola, Florida and Beeville, Texas.

Upon receiving his aviator wings in August 1966, he was assigned to VMFA-513 at the Marine Corps Air Station Cherry Point, North Carolina. There Springer flew F-4 Phantom II fighters. He was subsequently assigned to VMFA-115 at Chu Lai in South Vietnam, where he completed 300 F-4 combat missions. In June 1968, Springer served as an advisor to the South Korean Marine Corps units in Vietnam and flew 250 combat missions in O-1 Bird Dogs and UH-1 Iroquois "Huey" helicopters.

Springer returned to the United States to attend the U.S. Naval Postgraduate School in Monterey, California, receiving a Master of Science degree in Operations Research and Systems Analysis in 1971. In March 1971 he was assigned to the 3rd Marine Aircraft Wing at MCAS El Toro, California, where he became Wing operations analysis officer.

He flew UH-1Es in 1972 while with HML-267 at Camp Pendleton, California and then went to Okinawa in Japan to fly UH-1Es with HML-367, 1st Marine Aircraft Wing. Springer flew F-4 Phantom II fighters as an aircraft maintenance officer with VMFA-451 in Beaufort, South Carolina and also attended what was then called Navy Fighter Weapons School ("TOPGUN").

A 1975 graduate of the U.S. Naval Test Pilot School at NAS Patuxent River, Maryland, he served as Head of the Ordnance Systems branch and as a test pilot for more than 20 different types of fixed- and rotary-wing aircraft. In this capacity, he performed the first flights in the AH-1T helicopter. He graduated from the Armed Forces Staff College in Norfolk, Virginia in 1978, and was assigned to Headquarters Fleet Marine Force, Atlantic, where he assumed responsibility for joint operational planning for Marine Forces in NATO and the Middle East. He was serving as aide-de-camp for the Commanding General, Fleet Marine Force, Atlantic, when advised of his selection by NASA in May 1980.

== NASA experience ==
Springer became an astronaut in August 1981. His technical assignments included support crew for STS-3, concept development studies for the Space Operations Center, and the coordination of various aspects of the final development of the Remote Manipulator System ("Canadarm") for operational use. He worked at Mission Control in the Lyndon B. Johnson Space Center as the CAPCOM for seven flights between 1984 and 1985.

Springer was responsible for Astronaut Office coordination of Design Requirements Reviews and Design Certification Reviews. These review efforts encompassed the total recertification and reverification of the Shuttle prior to STS-26 return to flight status. He flew as a mission specialist on STS-29 in 1989, and STS-38 in 1990.

Springer retired from NASA and the U.S. Marine Corps in December 1990.

=== STS-29 ===
Space Shuttle Discovery (March 13–18, 1989) was launched from Kennedy Space Center. During 80 orbits of the Earth on this five-day mission, the crew deployed a Tracking and Data Relay Satellite, and performed numerous secondary experiments, including a Space Station "heat pipe" radiator experiment, two student experiments, a protein crystal growth experiment, and a chromosome and plant cell division experiment. In addition, the crew took over 4,000 photographs of the Earth using several types of cameras, including the IMAX 70 mm movie camera. Mission duration was 119 hours and concluded with a landing at Edwards Air Force Base, California.

=== STS-38 ===
Space Shuttle Atlantis (November 15–20, 1990) was launched at night from Kennedy Space Center. During the five-day mission the crew conducted Department of Defense operations. After 80 orbits of the Earth, Atlantis and her crew landed back at the Kennedy Space Center, in the first Shuttle recovery in Florida since 1985.

== Awards and honors ==
Distinguished Flying Cross, Bronze Star, Air Medal (21st award), Navy Commendation Medal (2nd award), Navy Achievement Medal, Combat Action Ribbon, NASA Space Flight Medal, Presidential Unit Citation, Navy Unit Citation, and various Vietnam Campaign ribbons and service awards.
