= TDRS-4 =

American communications satellite

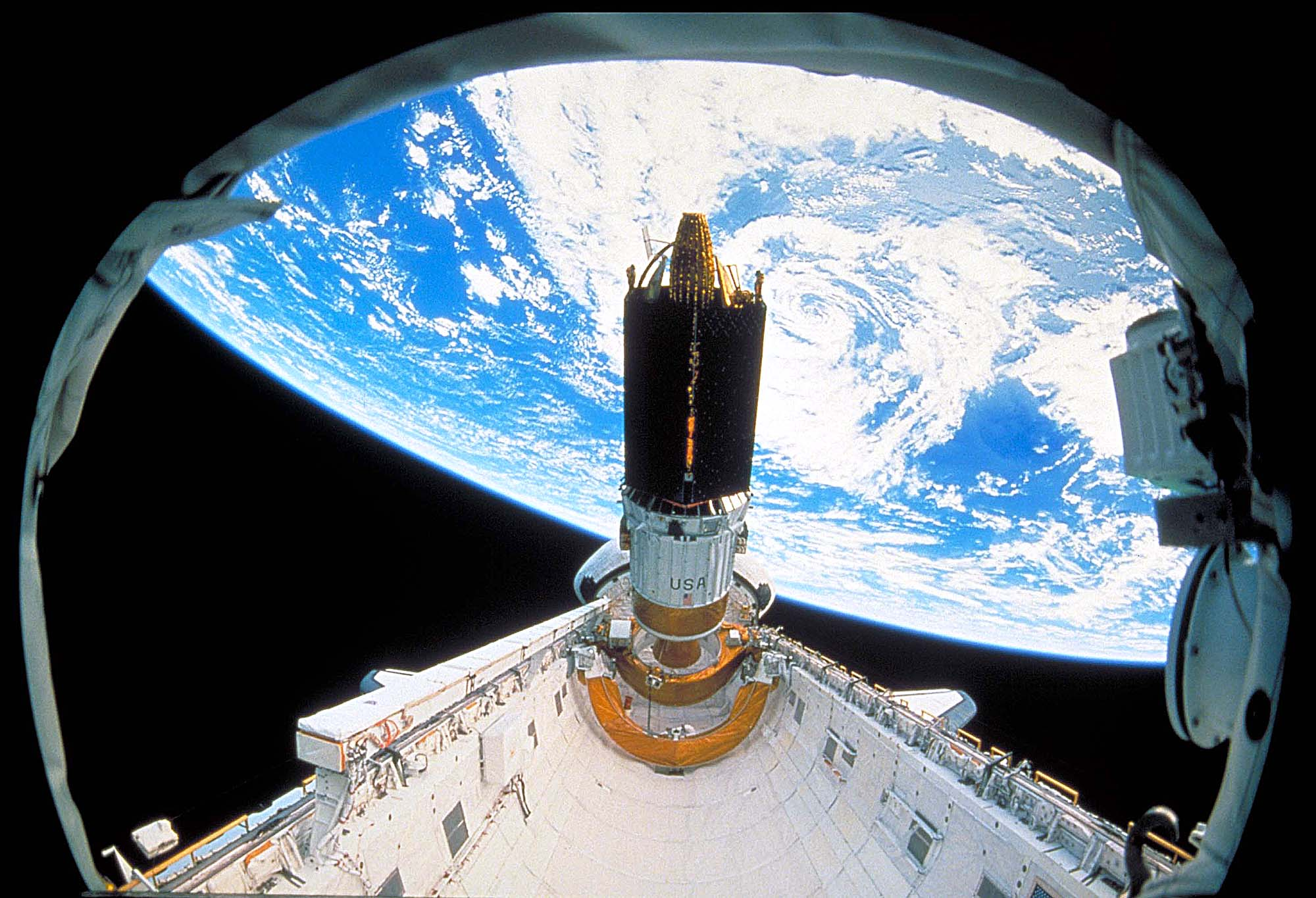
- TDRS-D being deployed from Discovery
- Mission type: Communication
- Operator: NASA
- COSPAR ID: 1989-021B
- SATCAT no.: 19883
- Mission duration: Planned: 10 years Final: 22 years, 9 months

Spacecraft properties
- Bus: TDRS
- Manufacturer: TRW
- Launch mass: 2,108 kg (4,647 lb)
- Dimensions: 17.3 × 14.2 m (57 × 47 ft)
- Power: 1700 watts

Start of mission
- Launch date: 13 March 1989, 14:57:00 UTC
- Rocket: Space Shuttle Discovery; STS-29R / IUS
- Launch site: Kennedy Space Center, LC-39B
- Contractor: Rockwell International

End of mission
- Disposal: Retired to graveyard
- Declared: December 2011
- Deactivated: May 2012

Orbital parameters
- Reference system: Geocentric orbit
- Regime: Geostationary orbit
- Longitude: 41.0° West (1988–2005); 46.0° West (2005–2011)
- Epoch: 14 March 1989

TDRS-4, known before launch as TDRS-D, was an American communications satellite, which was operated by NASA as part of the first generation Tracking and Data Relay Satellite System from 1989 until 2011. It was constructed by TRW, based on a custom satellite bus which was used for all seven of the first generation TDRS satellites.

== History ==
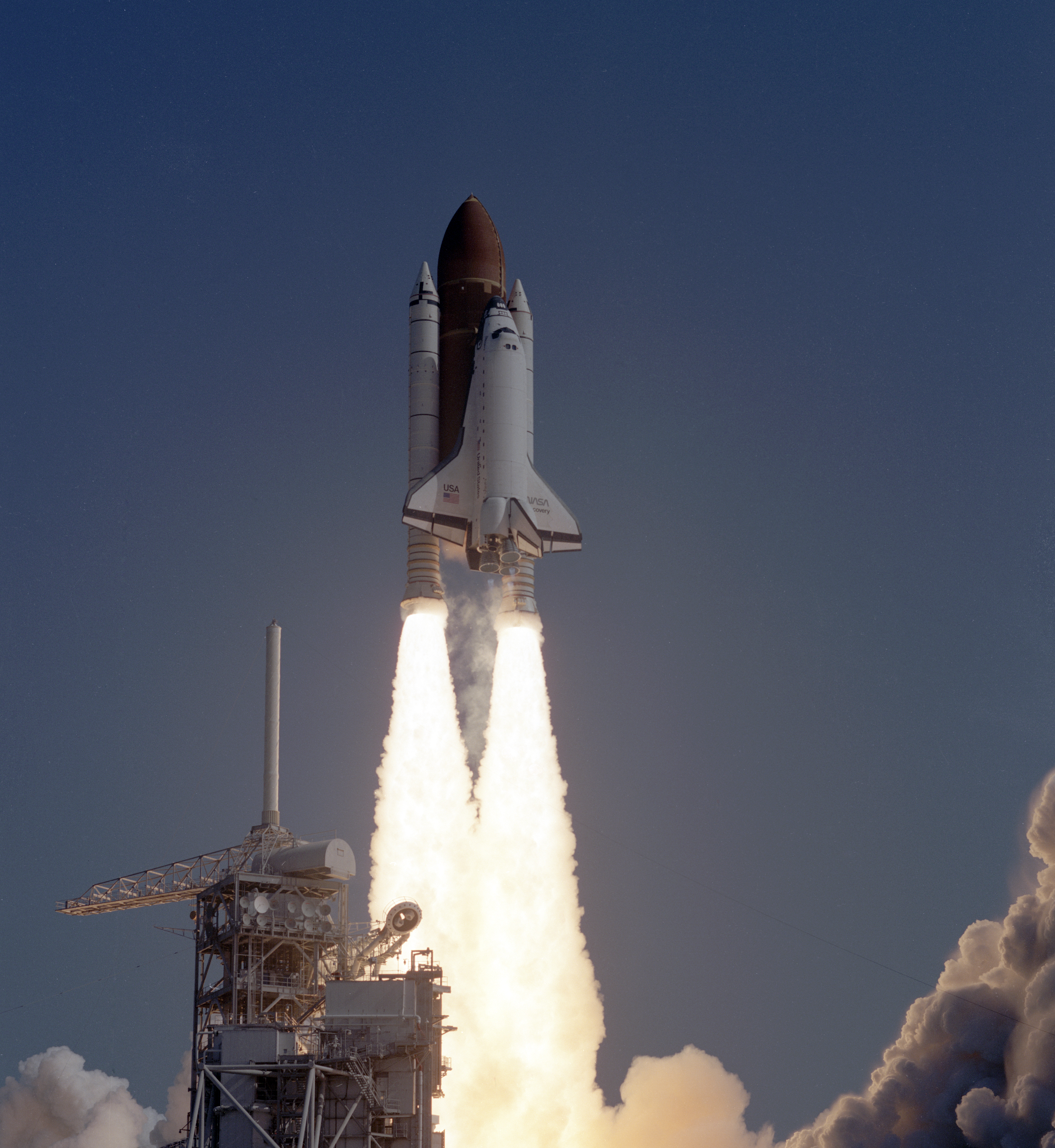
The launch of STS-29 carrying TDRS-D.

TDRS-D was launched aboard Space Shuttle Discovery during the STS-29 mission in 1989. Discovery launched from Launch Complex 39B at the Kennedy Space Center at 14:57:00 UTC on 13 March 1989. TDRS-D was deployed from Discovery a few hours after launch, and was raised to geostationary orbit by means of an Inertial Upper Stage.

=== Deployment ===
The twin-stage solid-propellant Inertial Upper Stage made two burns. The first stage burn occurred shortly after deployment from Discovery, and placed the satellite into a geostationary transfer orbit (GTO). At 03:30 UTC on 14 March 1989, it reached apogee, and the second stage fired, placing TDRS-D into geostationary orbit. At this point, it received its operational designation, TDRS-4. It was placed at a longitude 41.0° West of the Greenwich Meridian, from where it provided communications services to spacecraft in Earth orbit, including the Space Shuttle and International Space Station. In 2005, it was relocated to 46.0° West.

=== Retirement ===
TDRS-4 completed its planned mission in December 2011, and was subsequently removed to a graveyard orbit 350 kilometres (220 mi) above geostationary orbit belt, per International Telecommunication Union and United Nations recommendations. In May 2012, NASA reported that the orbit-raising maneuver had been completed successfully, and the spacecraft had been retired.

Location of TDRS as of 26 May 2020

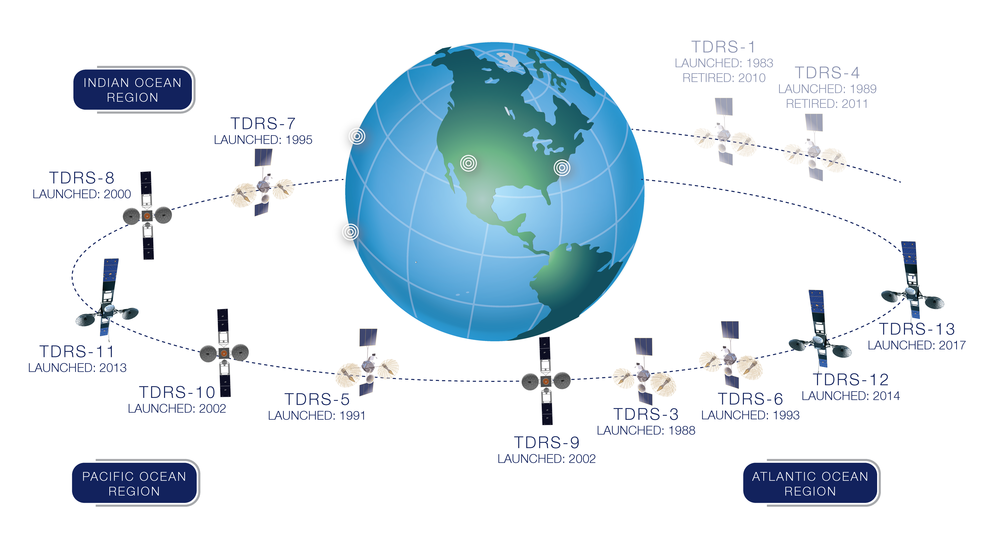
Location of TDRS as of 18 March 2019

== See also ==
- List of TDRS satellites
