= STS-29 =

1989 American crewed spaceflight to deploy TDRS-4

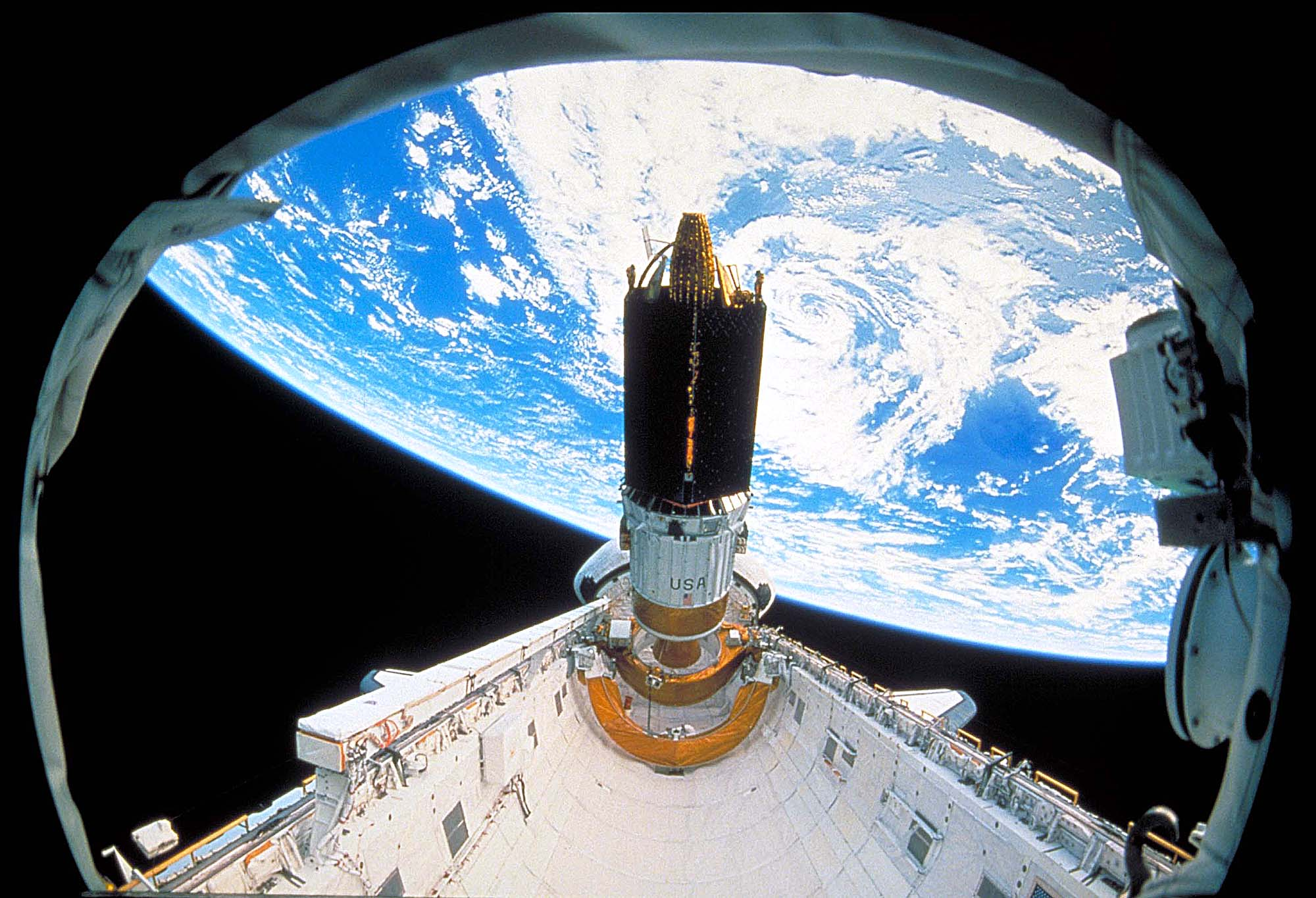
- TDRS-D being deployed on Flight Day 1 of the mission.
- Names: Space Transportation System-29; STS-29R
- Mission type: TDRS-D deployment
- Operator: NASA
- COSPAR ID: 1989-021A
- SATCAT no.: 19882
- Mission duration: 4 days, 23 hours, 38 minutes, 50 seconds
- Distance travelled: 3,200,000 km (2,000,000 mi)
- Orbits completed: 80

Spacecraft properties
- Spacecraft: Space Shuttle Discovery
- Launch mass: 116,281 kg (256,356 lb)
- Landing mass: 88,353 kg (194,785 lb)
- Payload mass: 17,280 kg (38,100 lb)

Crew
- Crew size: 5
- Members: Michael Coats; John E. Blaha; Robert C. Springer; James Buchli; James P. Bagian

Start of mission
- Launch date: March 13, 1989, 14:57:00 UTC (9:57 am EST)
- Launch site: Kennedy, LC-39B
- Contractor: Rockwell International

End of mission
- Landing date: March 18, 1989, 14:35:50 UTC (6:35:50 am PST)
- Landing site: Edwards, Runway 22

Orbital parameters
- Reference system: Geocentric orbit
- Regime: Low Earth orbit
- Perigee altitude: 297 km (185 mi)
- Apogee altitude: 308 km (191 mi)
- Inclination: 28.45°
- Period: 90.60 minutes

Instruments
- Air Force Maui Optical and Supercomputing observatory (AMOS); Chromosomes and Plant Cell Division in Space (CHROMEX); Protein Crystal Growth (PCG); Space Station Heat Pipe Advanced Radiator Element (SHARE); Two Shuttle Student Involvement Program (SSIP)
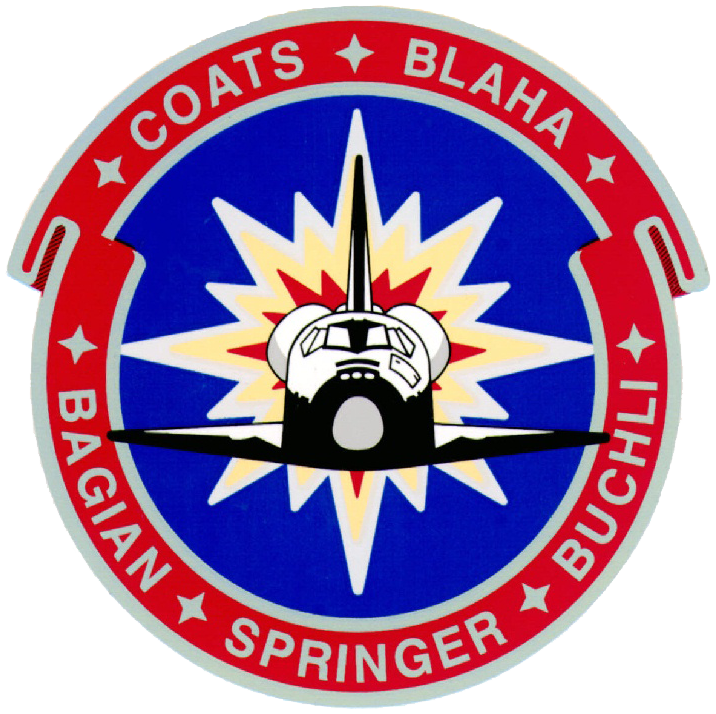
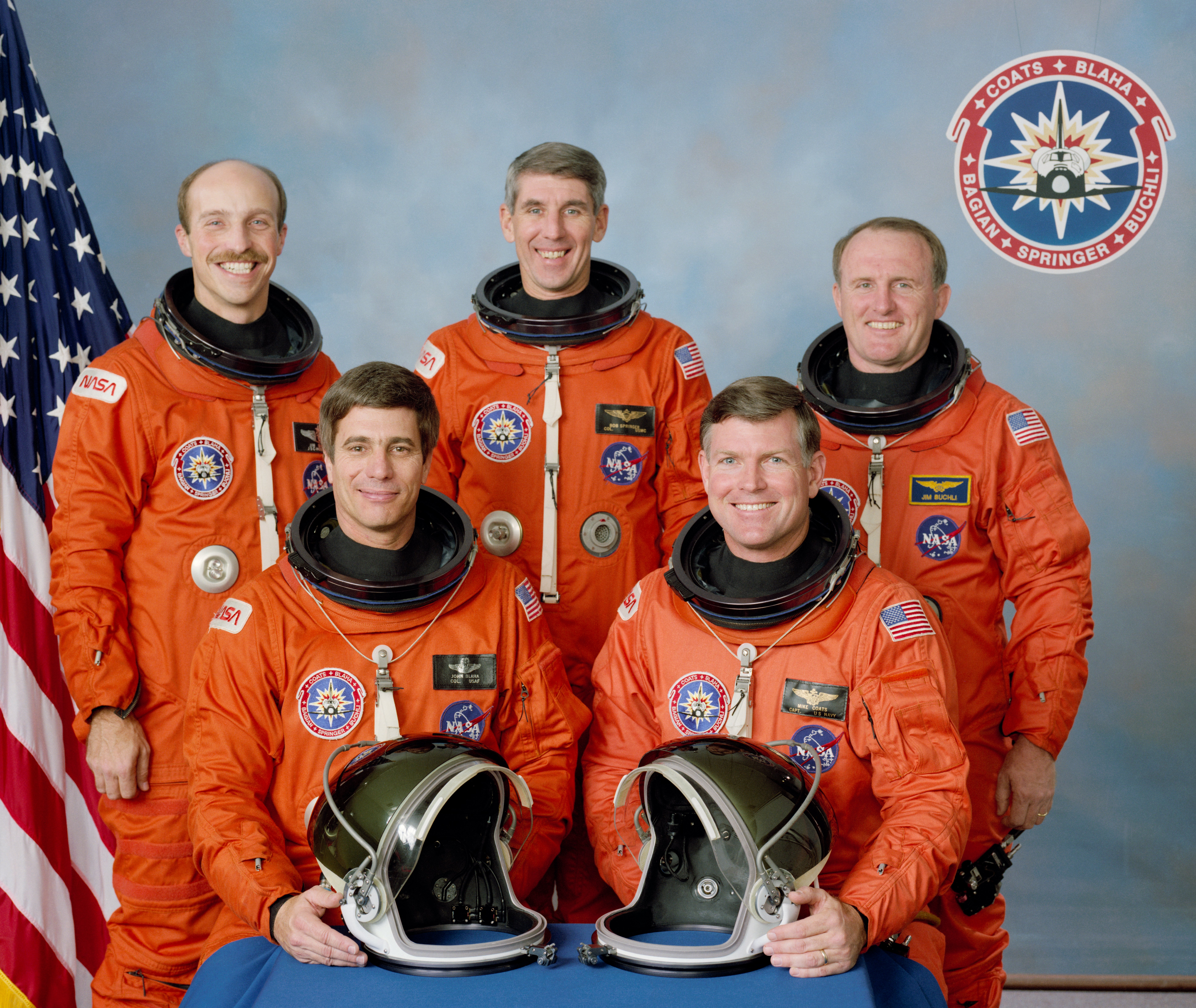
- STS-29 mission patch Back row: Bagian, Springer and Buchli; Front row: Blaha and Coats Space Shuttle program

STS-29 was the 28th NASA Space Shuttle mission, during which Space Shuttle Discovery inserted a Tracking and Data Relay Satellite (TDRS) into Earth orbit. It was the third shuttle mission following the Challenger disaster in 1986, and launched from Kennedy Space Center, Florida, on March 13, 1989. STS-29R was the eighth flight of Discovery and the 28th Space Shuttle mission overall; its planned predecessor, STS-28, was delayed until August 1989.

The mission was technically designated STS-29R as the original STS-29 designator belonged to STS-61-A, the 22nd Space Shuttle mission. Official documentation and paperwork for that mission contained the designator STS-29 when it was allocated to Space Shuttle Columbia and later as STS-30 when allocated to Challenger. As STS-51-L was designated STS-33, future flights with the STS-26 through STS-33 designators would require the R in their documentation to avoid conflicts in tracking data from one mission to another.

== Crew ==
Position	Astronaut
Commander	Michael Coats; Second spaceflight
Pilot	John E. Blaha; First spaceflight
Mission Specialist 1	Robert C. Springer; First spaceflight
Mission Specialist 2 Flight Engineer	James Buchli; Third spaceflight
Mission Specialist 3	James P. Bagian; First spaceflight

Prior to the Challenger disaster, this mission was slated to launch in June 1986 as STS-61-H with Columbia as the spacecraft. Anna L. Fisher was originally assigned to be as mission specialist, which would have been her second spaceflight. Fisher chose to leave from NASA in order to be with her family and was replaced by rookie James P. Bagian. This mission would include payload specialists from Indonesia and the United Kingdom, however, they did not have a chance to fly again.

=== Crew seat assignments ===
Seat	Launch	Landing	Seats 1–4 are on the flight deck. Seats 5–7 are on the mid-deck.
1	Coats		Seats 1–4 are on the flight deck. Seats 5–7 are on the mid-deck.
2	Blaha		Seats 1–4 are on the flight deck. Seats 5–7 are on the mid-deck.
3	Springer	Bagian	Seats 1–4 are on the flight deck. Seats 5–7 are on the mid-deck.
4	Buchli		Seats 1–4 are on the flight deck. Seats 5–7 are on the mid-deck.
5	Bagian	Springer	Seats 1–4 are on the flight deck. Seats 5–7 are on the mid-deck.
6	Unused		Seats 1–4 are on the flight deck. Seats 5–7 are on the mid-deck.
7	Unused		Seats 1–4 are on the flight deck. Seats 5–7 are on the mid-deck.

== Mission summary ==
Discovery lifted off from Launch Complex 39B, Kennedy Space Center, at 9:57:00 a.m. EST on March 13, 1989. The launch was originally scheduled for February 18, 1989, but was postponed to allow for the replacement of faulty liquid oxygen turbopumps on the three main engines. The amended target date of March 11, 1989, was postponed by 1 day, because of the failure of a master event controller (MEC); #2 when it was powered up during prelaunch checkout, as well as an additional day to replace a faulty fuel preburner oxidizer valve (FPOV). On the rescheduled launch day of March 13, 1989, the launch was delayed for nearly two hours because of ground fog and high upper winds. A waiver was approved for the orbiter's wing loads.

The primary payload was TDRS-D, the third and final component of the Tracking and Data Relay Satellite System (TDRSS) constellation in geosynchronous orbit. The three on-orbit satellites were stationed over the equator at about 35,900 km (22,300 mi) above Earth; two of them were positioned 130° apart, while the third was located between them as an on-orbit spare.

On Flight Day 1, one of three cryogenic hydrogen tanks which supplied shuttle's electricity-generating fuel cells exhibited erratic pressure fluctuations. It was deactivated while engineers studied the problem, and the crew was told to conserve electrical power. The tank was reactivated on Flight Day 3, March 15, 1989, and operated successfully thereafter.

Discovery landed on March 18, 1989, after orbit 80, one orbit earlier than planned, in order to avoid possible excessive wind buildup expected at the landing site. The shuttle touched down on Runway 22 at Edwards Air Force Base, California, at 9:35:51 a.m. EST. The total mission duration was 4 days, 23 hours, 38 minutes, and 52 seconds.

=== Payload and experiments ===
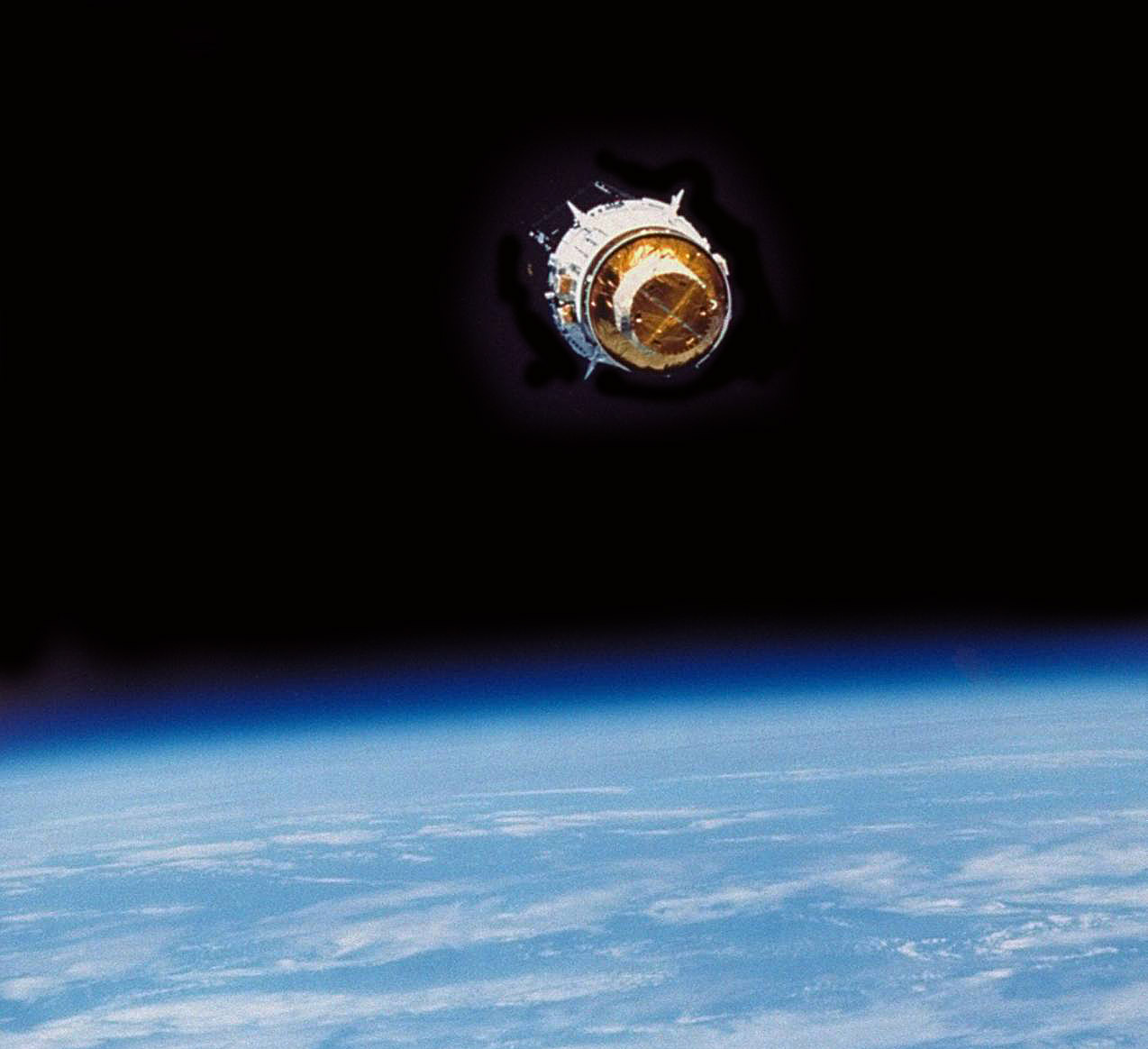
TDRS-4 after deployment

The mission's primary payload was TDRS-D, which became TDRS-4 after deployment, and its attached Inertial Upper Stage (IUS). The satellite was deployed from the shuttle's payload bay less than six hours after launch, at 3:12 a.m. EST. The first-stage orbit burn of the IUS took place an hour later, and the second burn to circularize the orbit occurred 12 hours and 30 minutes into the mission. The satellite was stationed at 41.0° West longitude.

Discovery also carried eight secondary payloads, including two Shuttle Student Involvement Program (SSIP) experiments. One student experiment, using four live rats with tiny pieces of bone removed from their bodies, was to test whether the environmental effects of space flight inhibit bone healing. The other student experiment was to fly 32 chicken eggs to determine the effects of space flight on fertilized chicken embryos.

One experiment, mounted in the payload bay, was only termed "partially successful". The Space Station Heat Pipe Advanced Radiator Element (SHARE), a potential cooling system for the planned Space Station Freedom, operated continuously for less than 30 minutes under powered electrical loads. The failure was blamed on the faulty design of the equipment, especially the manifold section.

All other experiments operated successfully. Crystals were obtained from all the proteins in the Protein Crystal Growth (PCG) experiment. The Chromosomes and Plant Cell Division in Space (CHROMEX), a life sciences experiment, was designed to show the effects of microgravity on root development. An IMAX (70 mm) camera was used to film a variety of scenes for the 1990 IMAX film Blue Planet, including the effects of floods, hurricanes, wildfires and volcanic eruptions on Earth. A ground-based U.S. Air Force experiment used the orbiter as a calibration target for the Air Force Maui Optical Site (AMOS) in Hawaii.

== Wake-up calls ==
NASA began a tradition of playing music to astronauts during the Project Gemini, and first used music to wake up a flight crew during Apollo 15. Each track is specially chosen, often by the astronauts' families, and usually has a special meaning to an individual member of the crew, or is applicable to their daily activities.

Flight Day	Song	Artist/Composer
Day 2	"I Got You (I Feel Good)"	James Brown
Day 3	"Marine Corps Hymn"	
Day 4	"Theme from Star Trek: TOS"	Alexander Courage
Day 5	"Heigh-Ho"	Song from the Walt Disney animated film Snow White and the Seven Dwarfs
Day 6	"What a Wonderful World"	Louis Armstrong

== Gallery ==
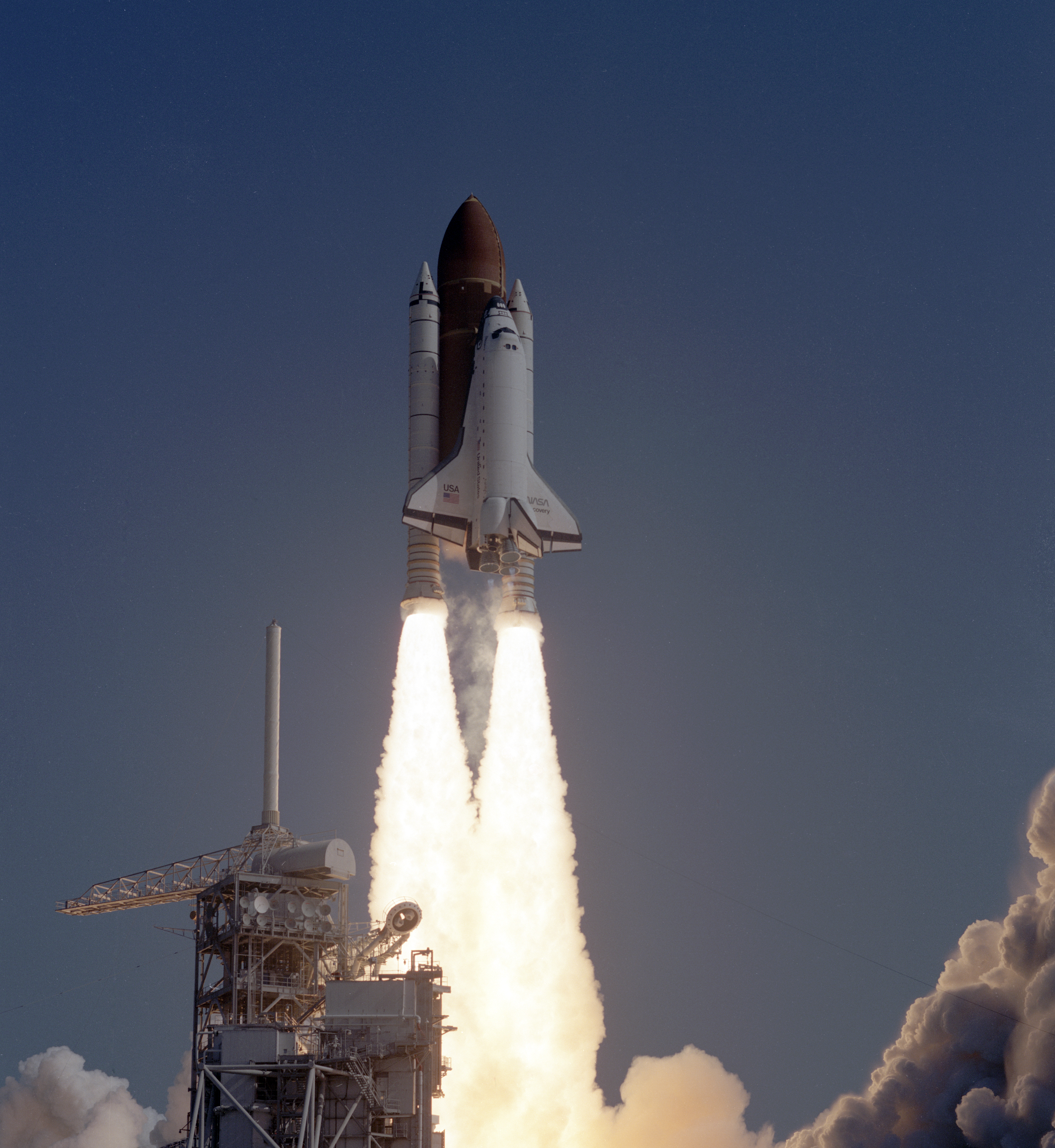
Liftoff of STS-29

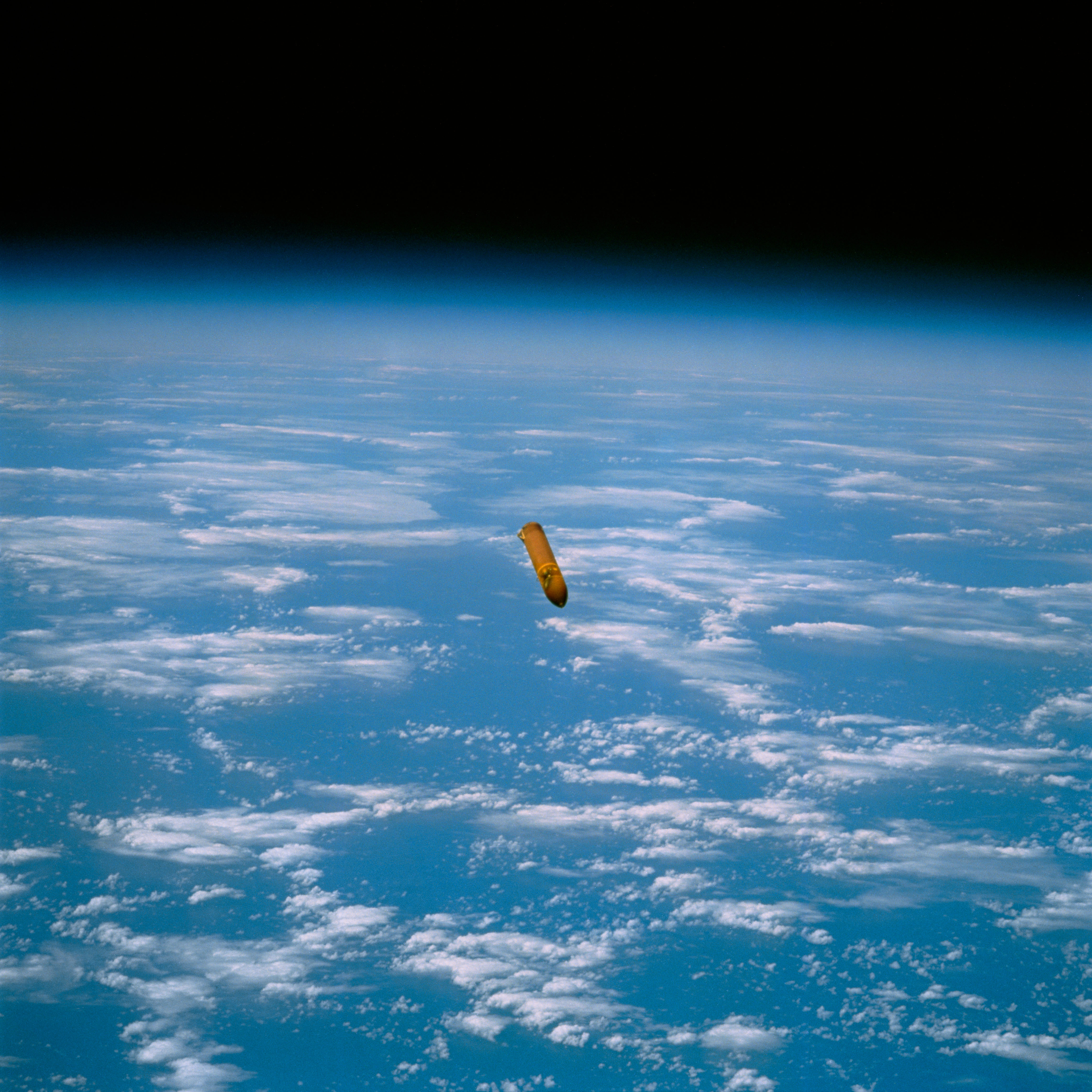
The External Tank after separation

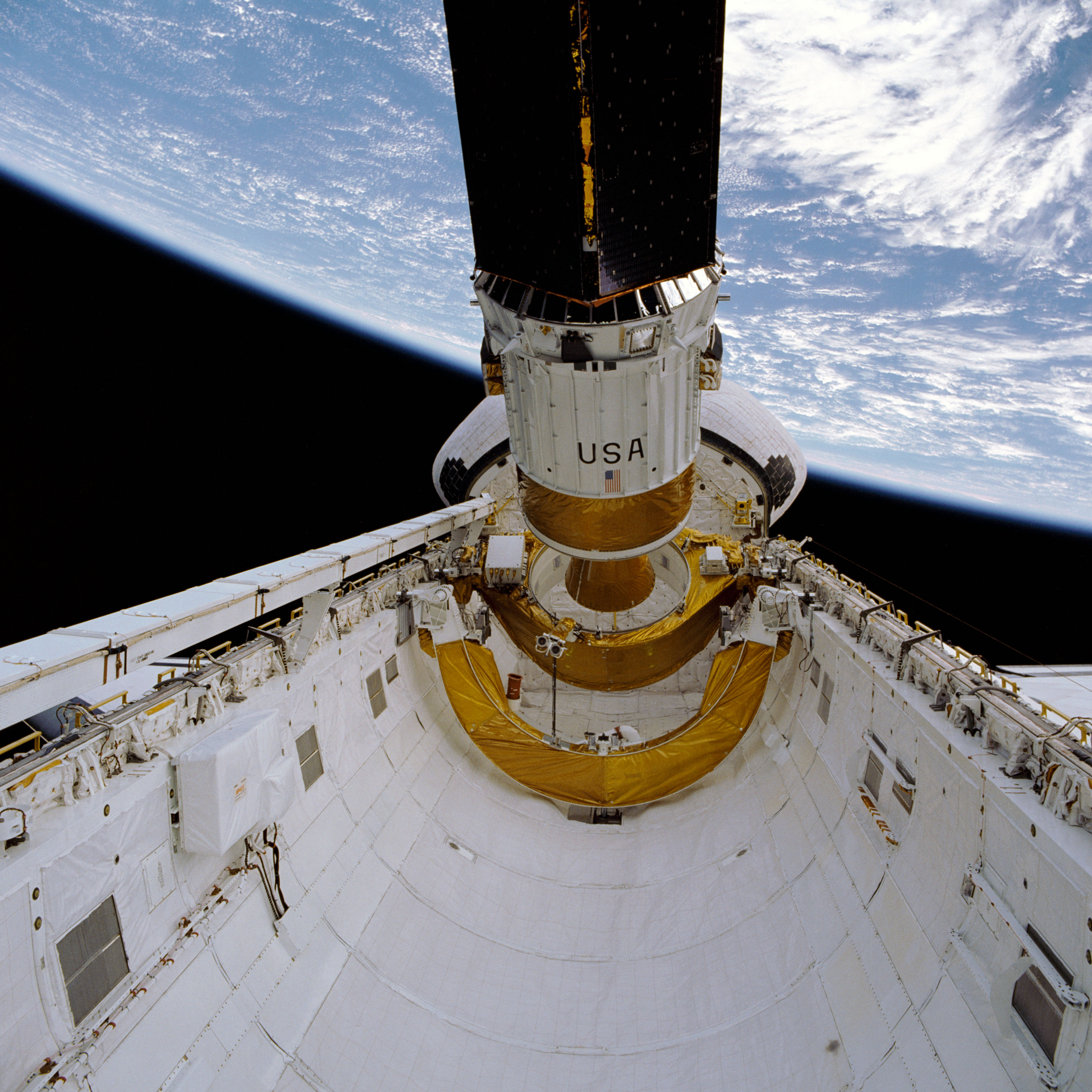
Closeup shot of the deployment of TDRS-D

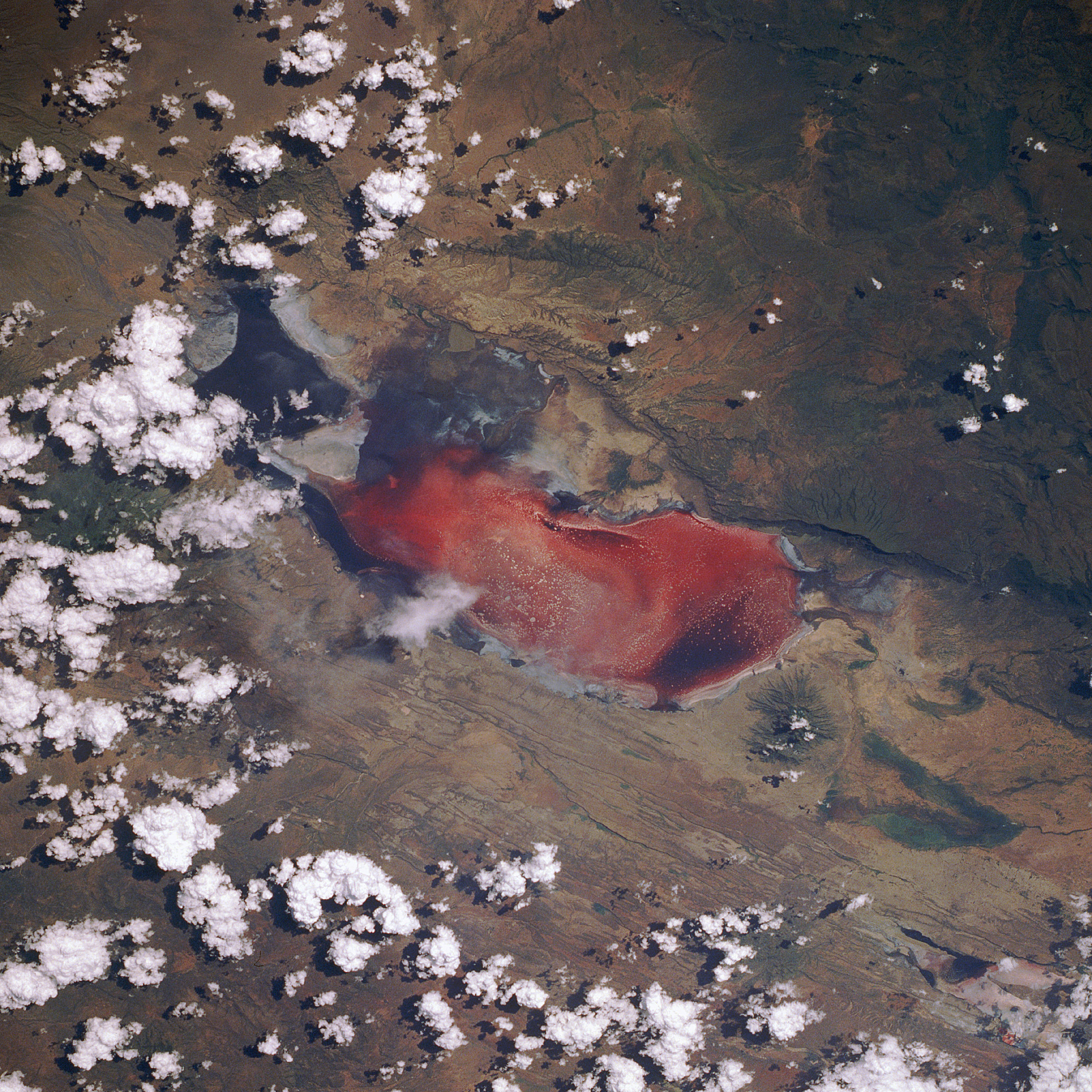
Lake Natron, Tanzania, imaged from orbit.

== See also ==
- List of human spaceflights
- List of Space Shuttle missions
