= Space Shuttle Discovery =

Space Shuttle orbiter (1984–2011)

Discovery
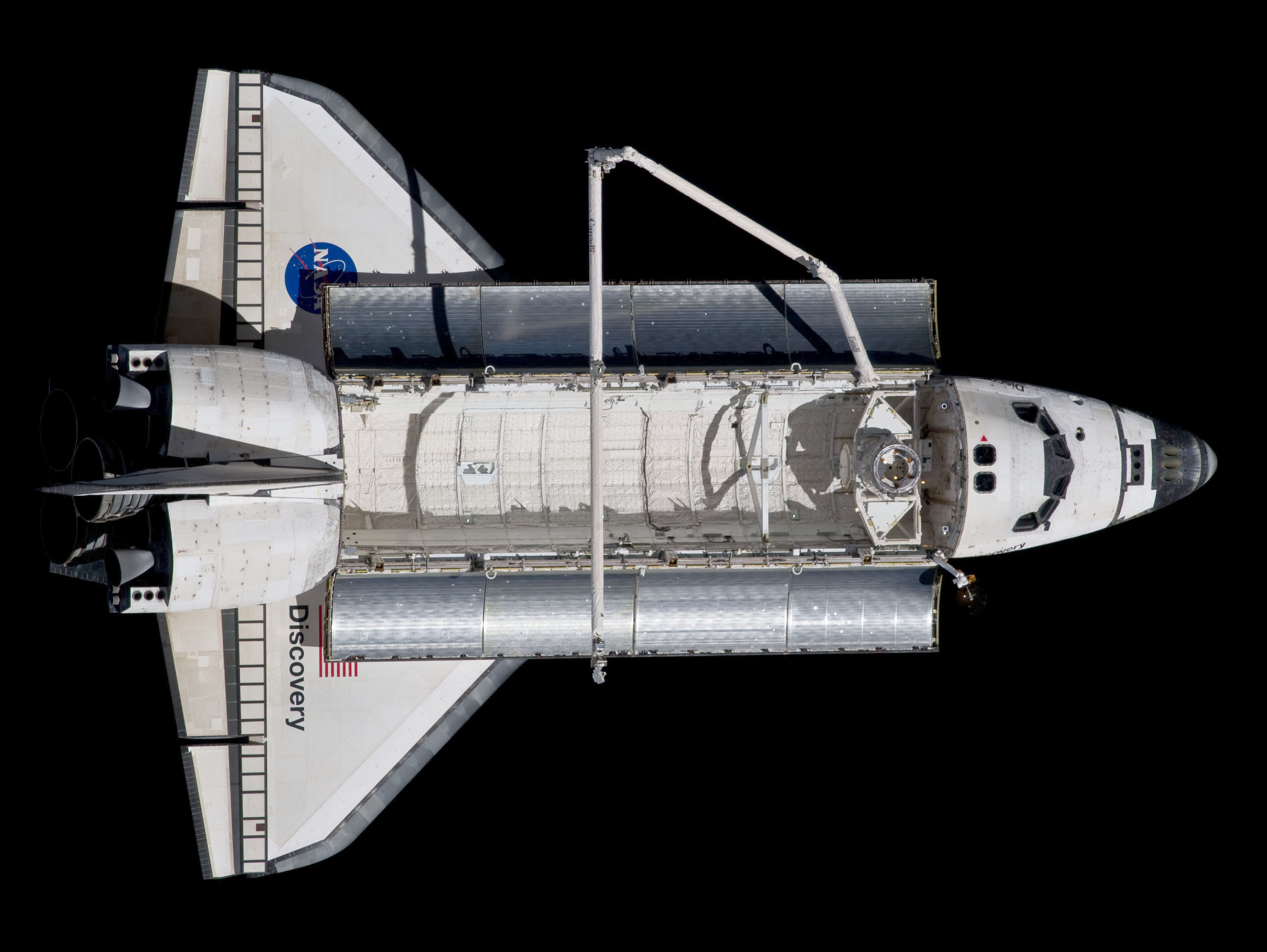
- Discovery in orbit in 2011, during STS-133, the orbiter's final flight
- Type: Spaceplane
- Class: Space Shuttle orbiter
- Eponym: Discovery (1602); HMS Discovery (1774)
- Serial no.: OV-103
- Owner: NASA
- Manufacturer: Rockwell International

Specifications
- Dry mass: 78,000 kilograms (172,000 lb)
- Rocket: Space Shuttle

History
- First flight: August 30 – September 5, 1984; STS-41-D
- Last flight: February 24 – March 9, 2011; STS-133
- Flights: 39
- Flight time: 8,783 hours
- Travelled: 238,539,663 kilometres (148,221,675 mi) around Earth
- Orbits: 5,830 around Earth
- Fate: Retired
- Location: Steven F. Udvar-Hazy Center; Chantilly, Virginia

Space Shuttle orbiters

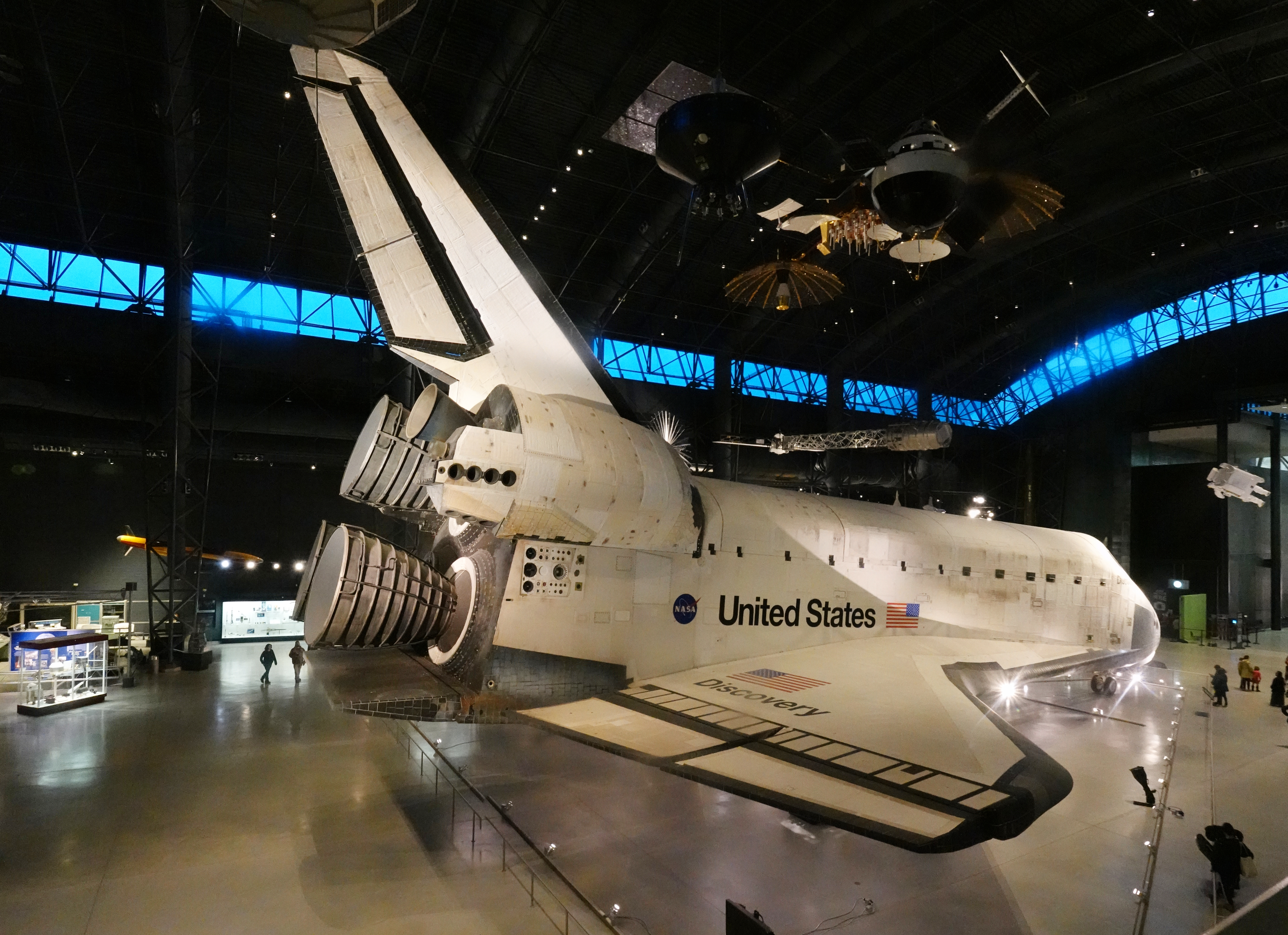
Space Shuttle Discovery at the Steven F. Udvar-Hazy Center

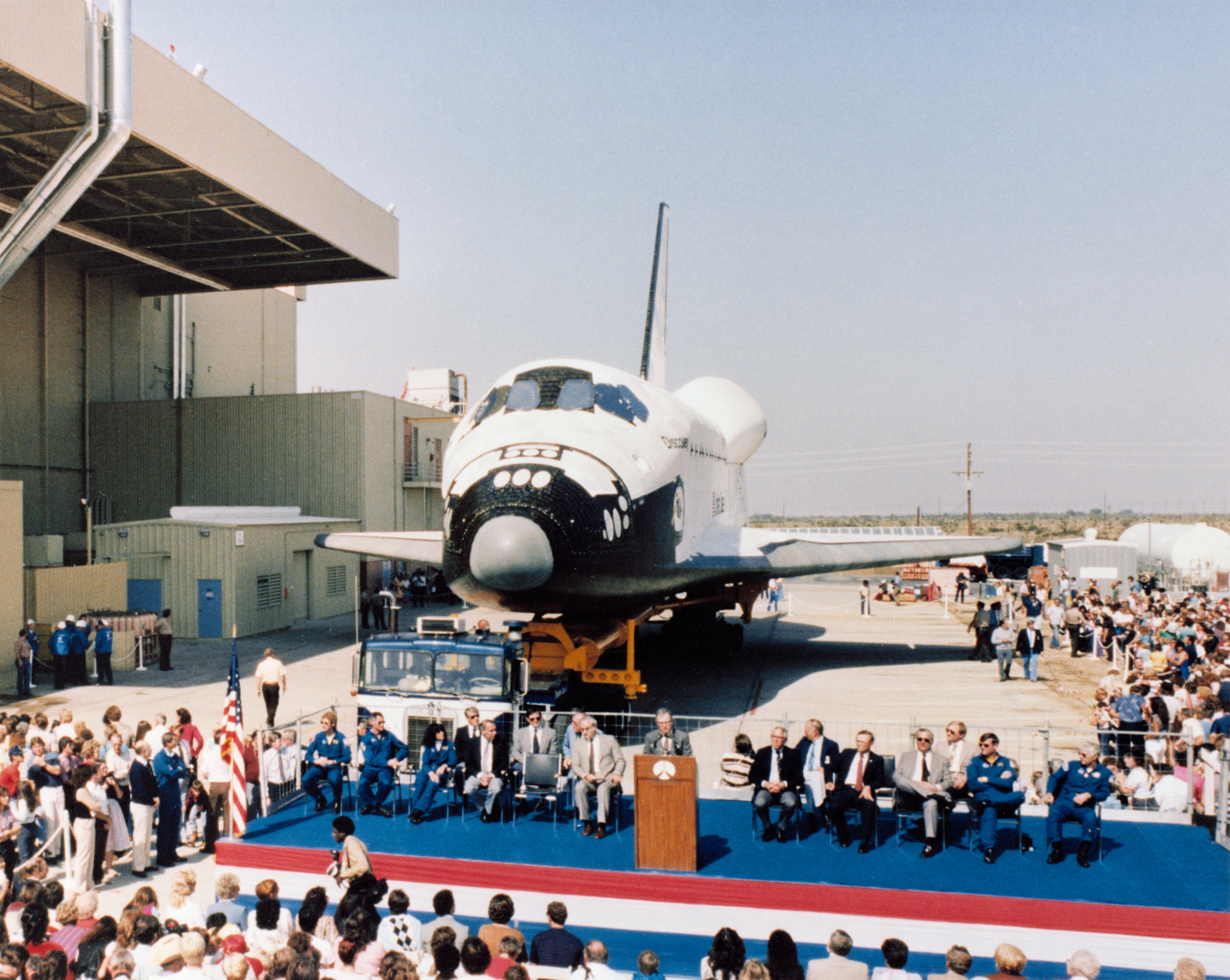
Discovery rollout ceremony in October 1983

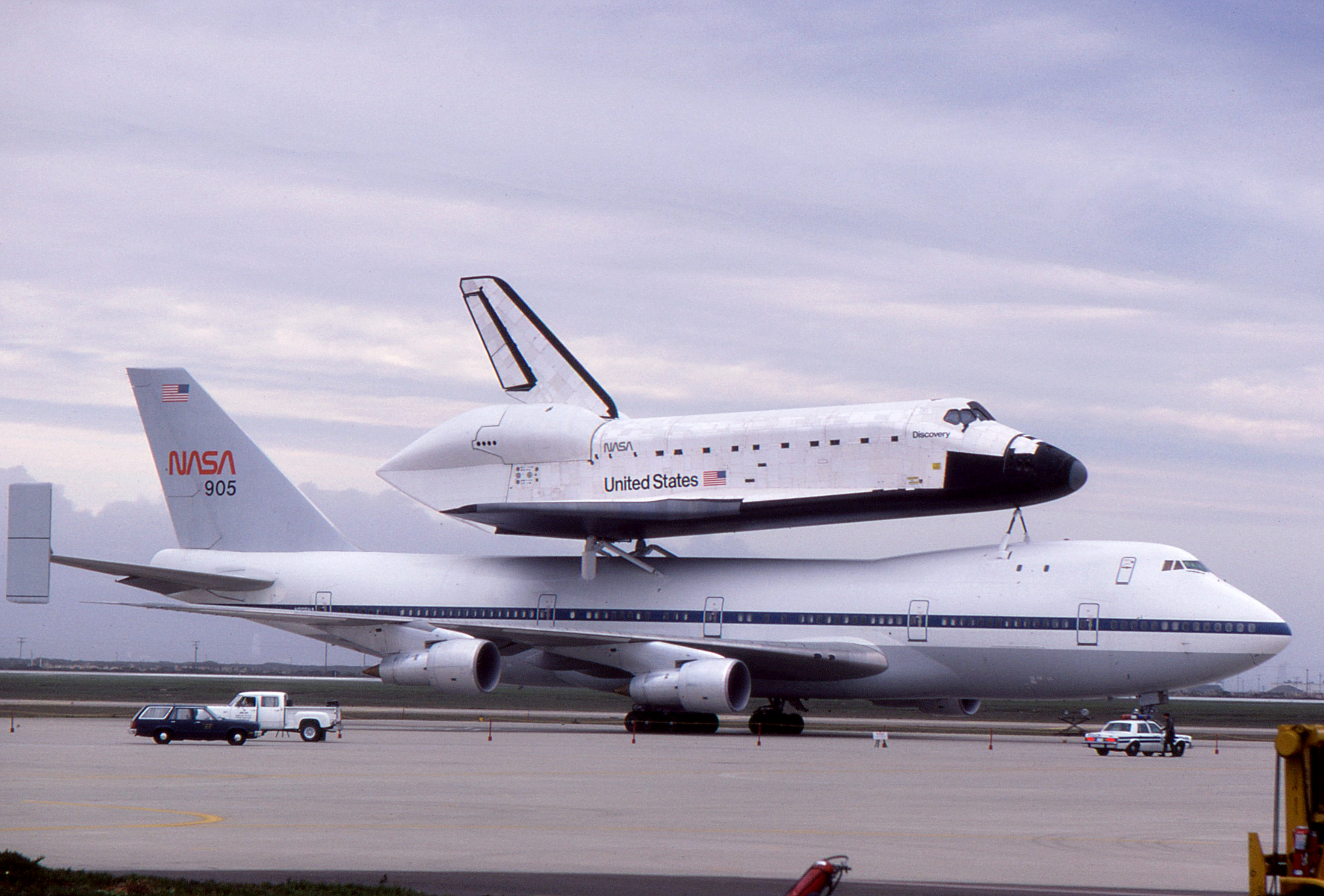
Discovery and SCA 905 at Vandenberg Air Force Base, November 6, 1983

Space Shuttle Discovery (Orbiter Vehicle Designation: OV-103) is a retired American Space Shuttle orbiter. The spaceplane was one of the orbiters from NASA's Space Shuttle program and the third of five fully operational orbiters to be built. Its first mission, STS-41-D, flew from August 30 to September 5, 1984. Over 27 years of service it launched and landed 39 times, aggregating more spaceflights than any other spacecraft as of December 2024. The Space Shuttle launch vehicle had three main components: the Space Shuttle orbiter, a single-use central fuel tank, and two reusable solid rocket boosters. Nearly 25,000 heat-resistant tiles cover the orbiter to protect it from high temperatures on re-entry.

Discovery became the third operational orbiter to enter service, preceded by Columbia and Challenger. After the Challenger and Columbia accidents, Discovery became the oldest surviving orbiter. It embarked on its final mission, STS-133, on February 24, 2011, and touched down for the last time at Kennedy Space Center on March 9, having spent a cumulative total of nearly a full year in space. Discovery performed both research and International Space Station (ISS) assembly missions, and also carried the Hubble Space Telescope into orbit among other satellites.

Discovery was the first operational shuttle to be retired, followed by Endeavour and then Atlantis. The shuttle is now on display at the Steven F. Udvar-Hazy Center of the Smithsonian National Air and Space Museum.

== History ==
The name Discovery was chosen to carry on a tradition based on ships of exploration, primarily HMS Discovery, one of the ships commanded by Captain James Cook during his third and final major voyage from 1776 to 1779, and Henry Hudson's Discovery, which was used in 1610–1611 to explore Hudson Bay and search for a Northwest Passage. Other ships bearing the name have included HMS Discovery of the 1875–1876 British Arctic Expedition to the North Pole, and RRS Discovery, which carried the 1901–1904 Discovery Expedition to Antarctica, led by Captain Scott.

Space Shuttle Discovery launched the Hubble Space Telescope and conducted the second and third Hubble service missions. It also launched the Ulysses probe and three TDRS satellites. Twice Discovery was chosen as the "Return To Flight" Orbiter, first in 1988 after the loss of Challenger in 1986, and then again for the twin "Return To Flight" missions in July 2005 and July 2006 after the Columbia disaster in 2003. Project Mercury astronaut John Glenn, who was 77 at the time, flew with Discovery on STS-95 in 1998, making him the oldest person to go into space at that time in history.

Had plans to launch United States Department of Defense payloads from Vandenberg Air Force Base gone ahead, Discovery would have become the dedicated US Air Force shuttle. Its first West Coast mission, STS-62-A, was scheduled for 1986, but canceled in the aftermath of the Challenger disaster.

On May 27, 1999, Discovery was launched on STS-96, the first shuttle mission to dock with the International Space Station.

Discovery was retired after completing its final mission, STS-133 on March 9, 2011. The spacecraft is now on display in Virginia at the Steven F. Udvar-Hazy Center, an annex of the Smithsonian Institution's National Air and Space Museum.

== Construction milestones ==
Date	Milestone
1979 January 29	Contract Award to Rockwell International's Space Transportation Systems Division in Downey, California
1979 August 27	Start long lead fabrication of Crew Module
1980 June 20	Start fabrication lower fuselage
1980 November 10	Start structural assembly of aft-fuselage
1980 December 8	Start initial system installation aft fuselage
1981 March 2	Start fabrication/assembly of payload bay doors
1981 October 26	Start initial system installation, crew module, Downey
1982 January 4	Start initial system installation upper forward fuselage
1982 March 16	Midfuselage on dock, Palmdale, California
1982 March 30	Elevons on dock, Palmdale
1982 April 30	Wings arrive at Palmdale from Grumman
1982 April 30	Lower forward fuselage on dock, Palmdale
1982 July 16	Upper forward fuselage on dock, Palmdale
1982 August 5	Vertical stabilizer on dock, Palmdale
1982 September 3	Start of Final Assembly
1982 October 15	Body flap on dock, Palmdale
1983 January 11	Aft fuselage on dock, Palmdale
1983 February 25	Complete final assembly and closeout installation, Palmdale
1983 February 28	Start initial subsystems test, power-on, Palmdale
1983 May 13	Complete initial subsystems testing
1983 July 26	Complete subsystems testing
1983 August 12	Completed Final Acceptance
1983 October 16	Rollout from Palmdale
1983 November 5	Overland transport from Palmdale to Edwards Air Force Base
1983 November 9	Delivery to Kennedy Space Center
1984 June 2	Flight Readiness Firing
1984 August 30	First Flight (STS-41-D)

== Features and upgrades ==
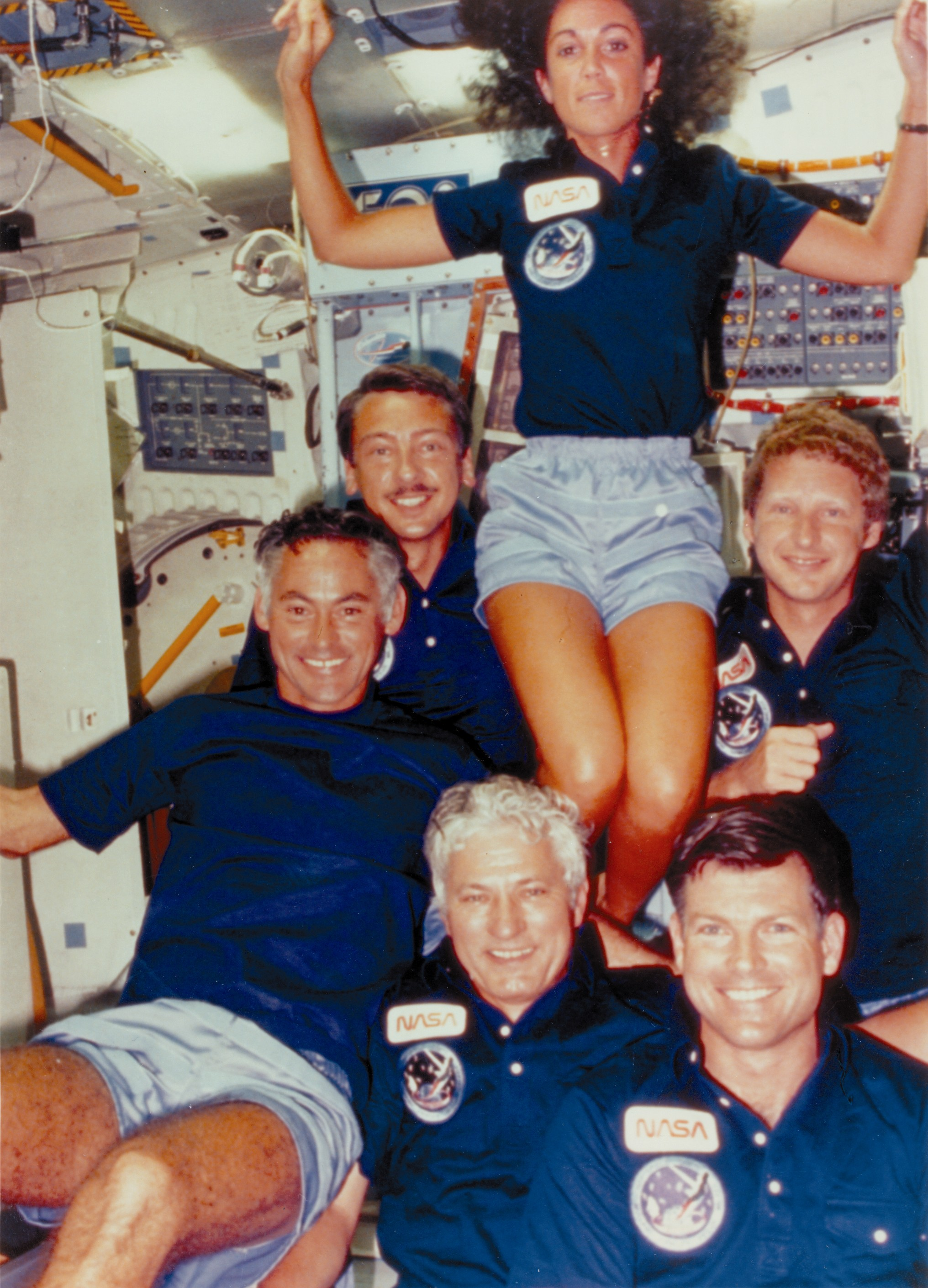
On the maiden voyage of Discovery: Judith Resnik, Henry Hartsfield, Michael L. Coats, Steven A. Hawley, Charles D. Walker, and Richard M. Mullane

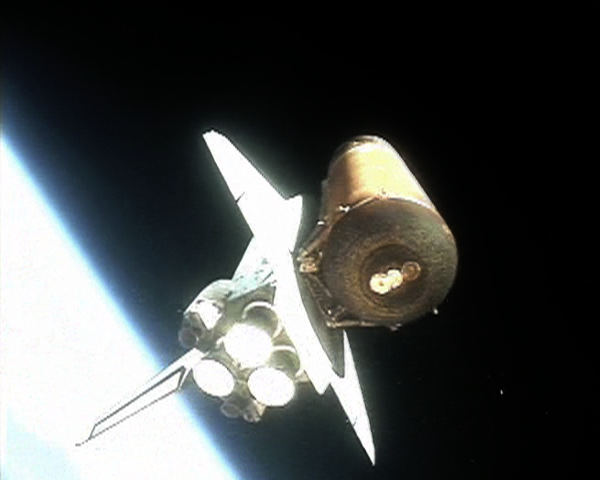
Discovery after booster separation on STS-121

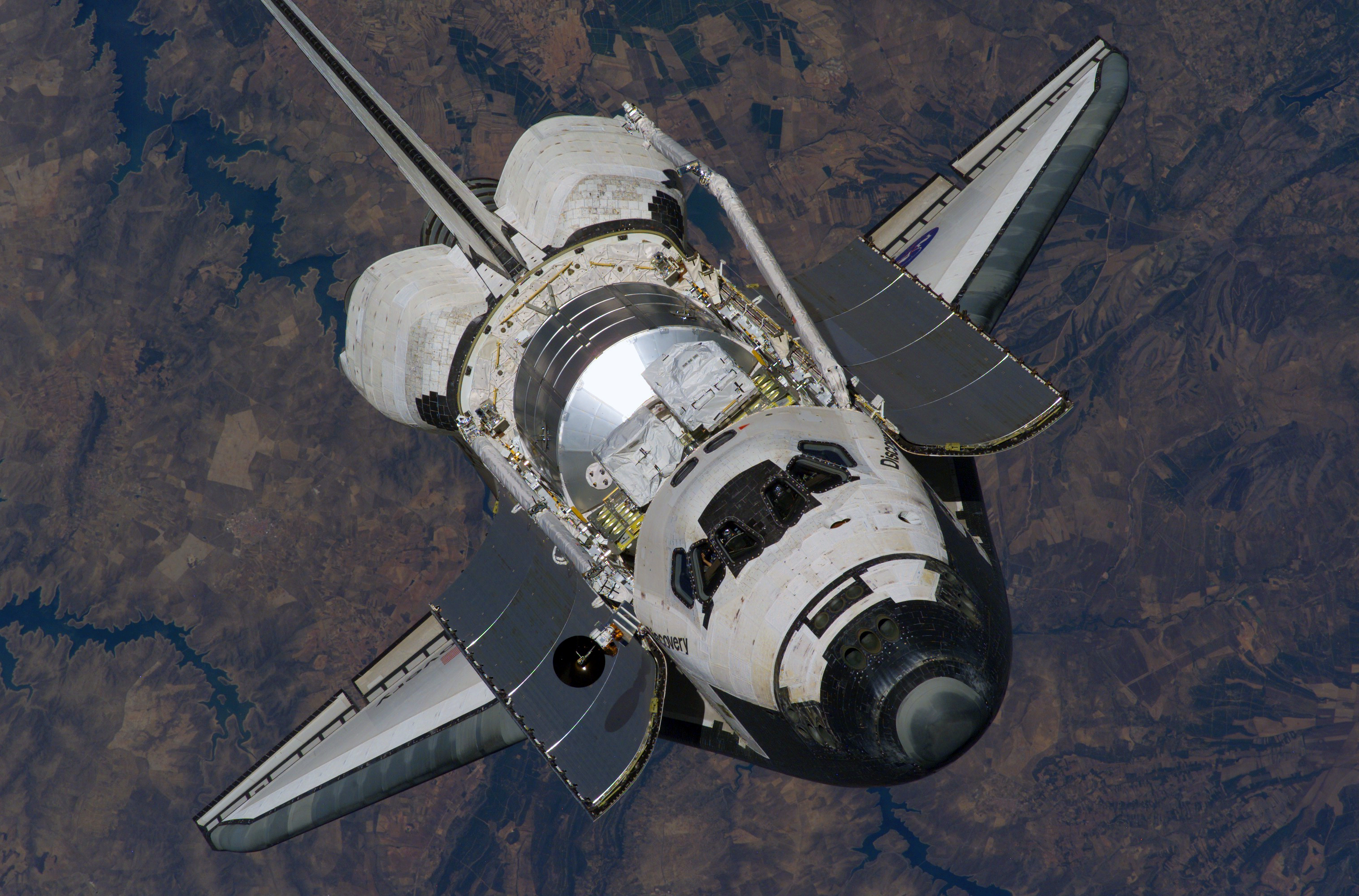
Discovery approaching the ISS on STS-121, its 'teardrop' feature clearly visible

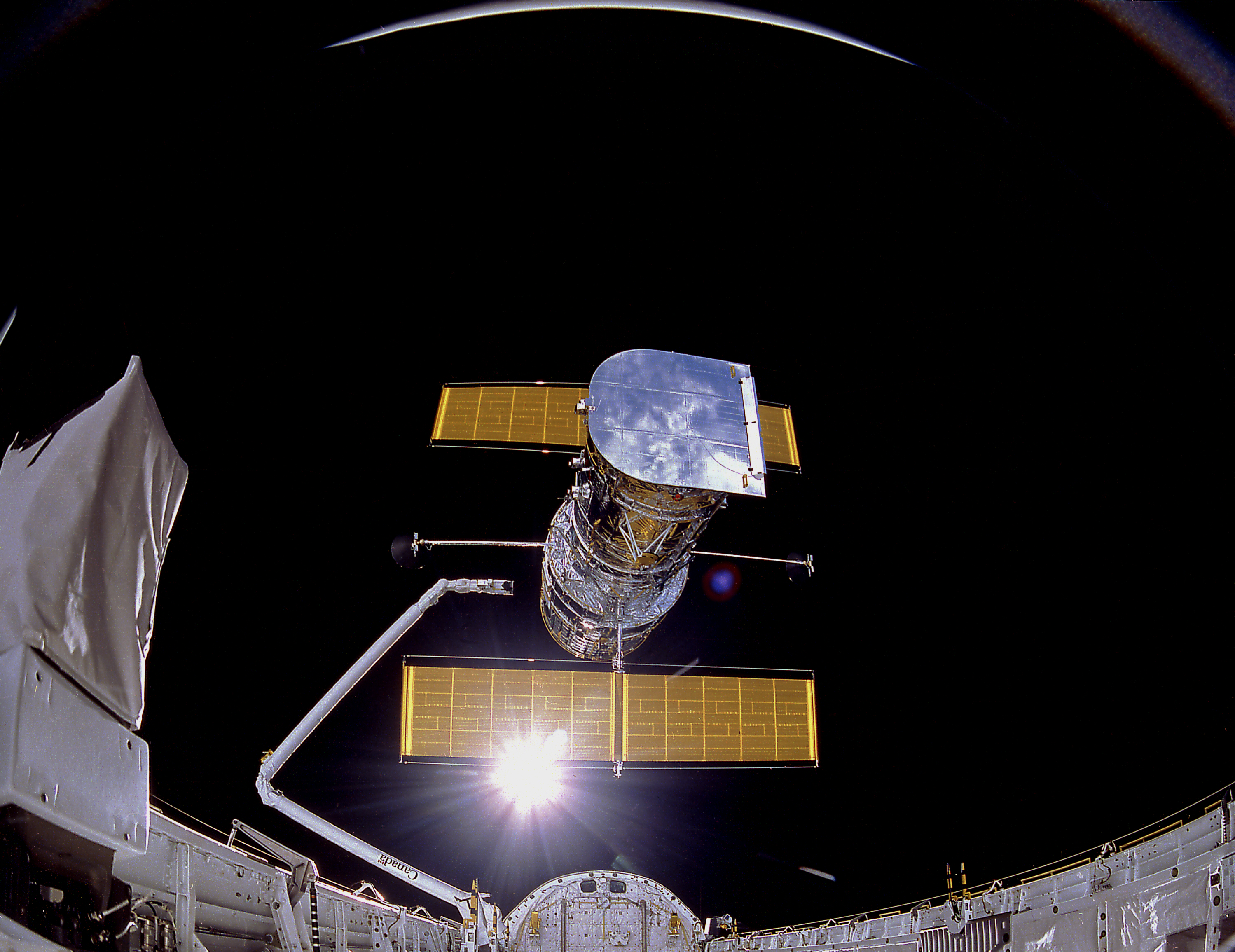
Discovery sends the Hubble Space Telescope into orbit on April 25, 1990

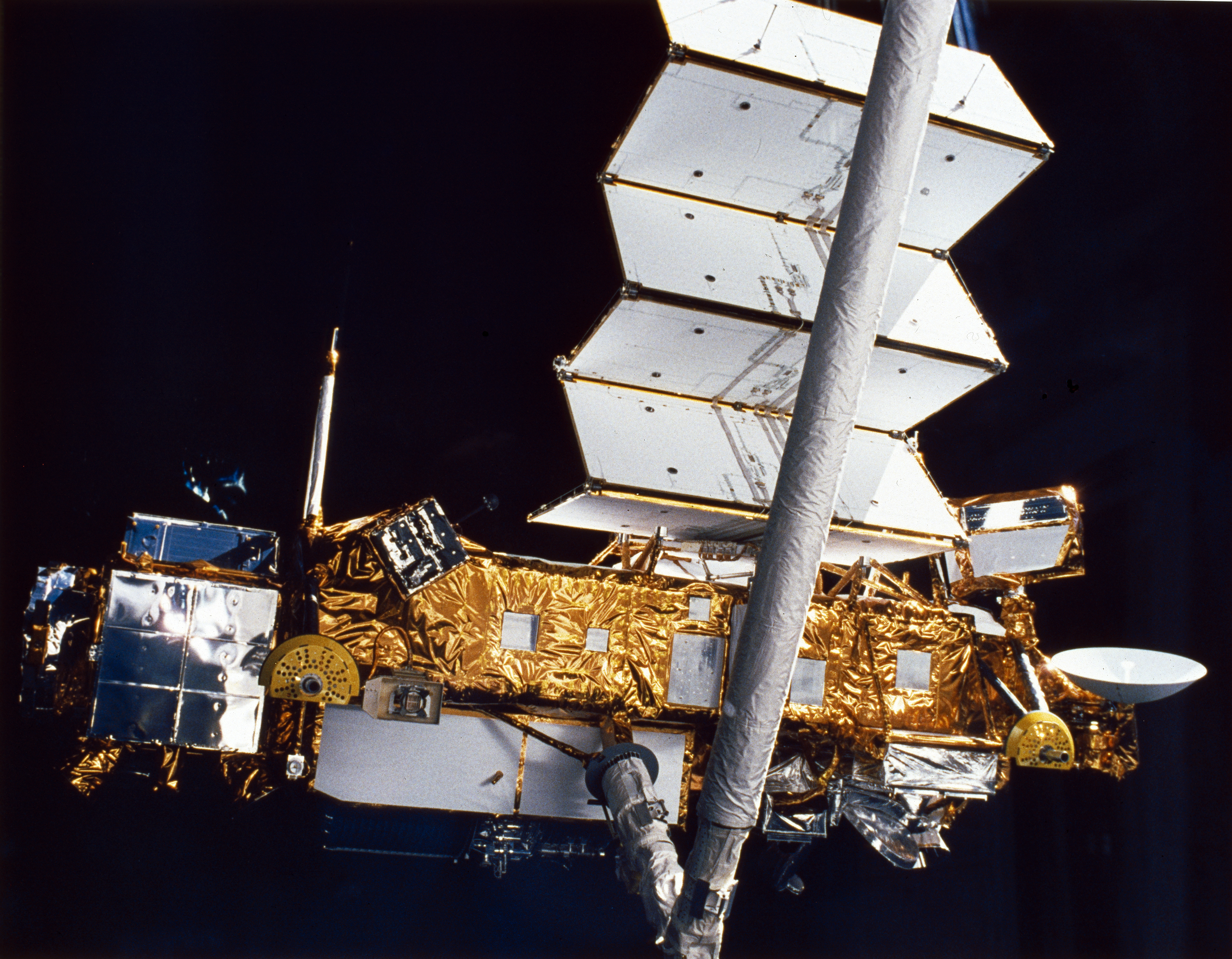
The Upper Atmosphere Research Satellite (UARS), one of the many satellites deployed from Discovery (photo from STS-48)

During its construction, Discovery was fitted with several black tiles near the middle starboard window where there should have been white tiles. It is unknown if this was the result of a harmless manufacturing mishap or done intentionally to give a distinctive look to the shuttle. This feature has been called 'teardrop' and allowed Discovery to be told apart from the rest of the fleet without looking at its name, although often unnoticed by the uninitiated.

The spacecraft weighed roughly 6,870 lb (3,120 kg) less than Columbia when it was brought into service due to optimalizations determined during the construction and testing of Enterprise, Columbia and Challenger. Discovery weighs 6 pounds (2.7 kg) heavier than Atlantis and 363 pounds (165 kg) heavier than Endeavour after further weight-saving adjustments were made.

Part of the Discovery weight optimizations included the greater use of quilted AFRSI blankets rather than the white LRSI tiles on the fuselage, and the use of graphite epoxy instead of aluminum for the payload bay doors and some of the wing spars and beams.

Upon its delivery to the Kennedy Space Center in 1983, Discovery was modified alongside Challenger to accommodate the liquid-fueled Centaur-G booster, which had been planned for use beginning in 1986 but was cancelled in the wake of the Challenger disaster.

Beginning in late 1995, the orbiter underwent a nine-month Orbiter Maintenance Down Period (OMDP) in Palmdale, California. This included outfitting the vehicle with a fifth set of cryogenic tanks and an external airlock to support missions to the International Space Station. As with all the orbiters, it could be attached to the top of specialized aircraft and did so in June 1996 when it returned to the Kennedy Space Center, and later in April 2012 when sent to the Udvar-Hazy Center, riding piggy-back on a modified Boeing 747.

After STS-105, Discovery became the first of the orbiter fleet to undergo Orbiter Major Modification (OMM) period at the Kennedy Space Center. Work began in September 2002 to prepare the vehicle for Return to Flight. The work included scheduled upgrades and additional safety modifications.

== Decommissioning ==
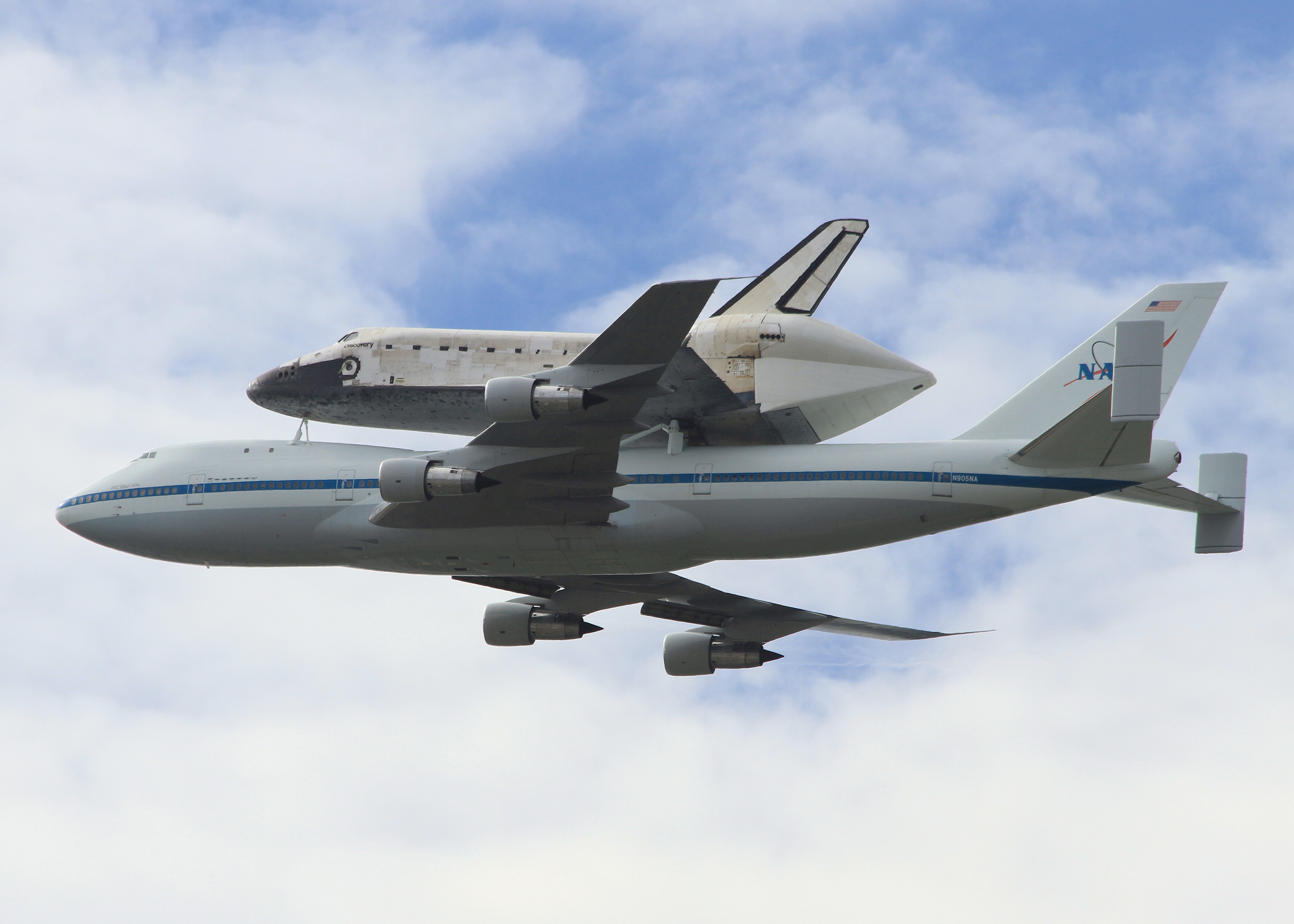

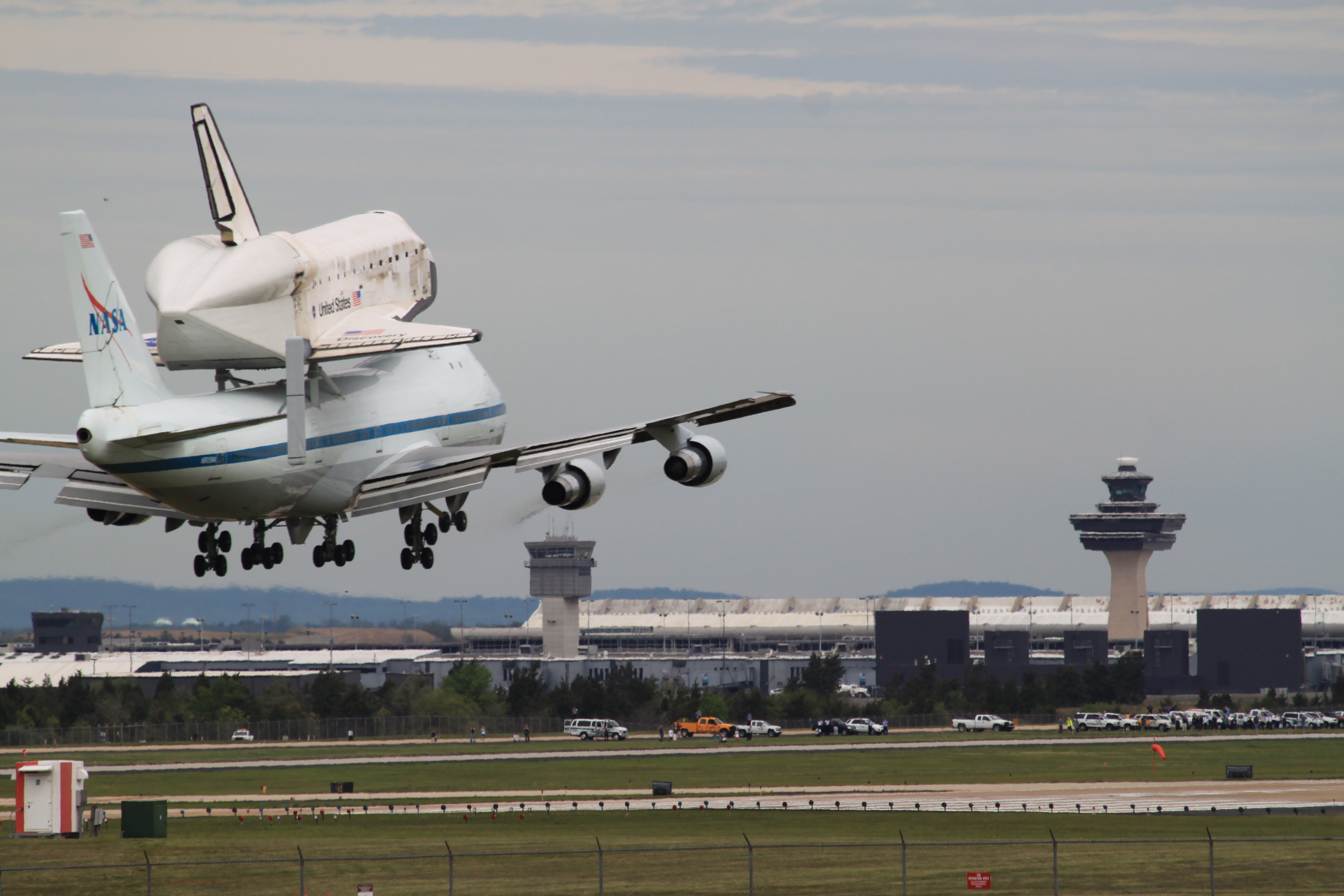
SCA N905NA carrying Discovery on the last flyover of the National Mall at around 10:15 am EDT, during its 11:05 am landing at Dulles airport on April 17, 2012

Discovery was decommissioned on March 9, 2011. NASA offered Discovery to the Smithsonian Institution's National Air and Space Museum for public display and preservation, after a month-long decontamination process, as part of the national collection. Discovery replaced Enterprise, which was in the Smithsonian's display at the Steven F. Udvar-Hazy Center until 2011. Discovery was transported to Washington Dulles International Airport on April 17, 2012, and was transferred to the Udvar-Hazy Center on April 19 where a welcome ceremony was held. Afterwards, at around 5:30 pm, Discovery was rolled to its "final wheels stop" in the Udvar-Hazy Center.

Texas senators John Cornyn and Ted Cruz added a provision to the 2025 One Big Beautiful Bill Act to spend $85 million to relocate a space vehicle that has flown astronauts into space, presumably Discovery because of the sponsors of the provision and previous legislation attempts, from the Udvar-Hazy Center to the Space Center Houston Museum in Texas. While the Smithsonian estimated that the total cost of the transfer would be approximately $325 million, they also countered that ownership of the shuttle had been transferred to the museum and was no longer federal property, and that Congress did not have the ability to force a transfer.

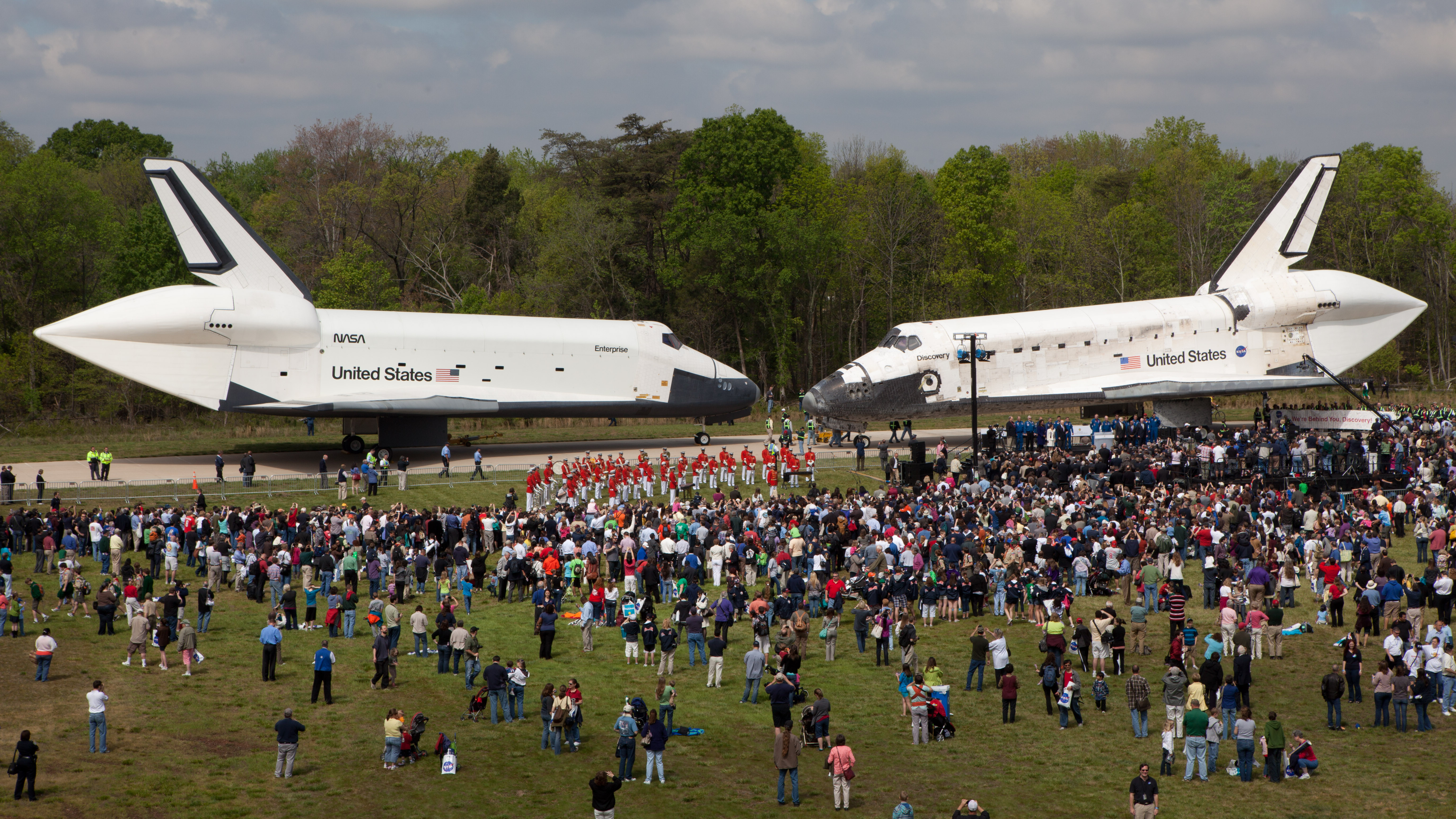

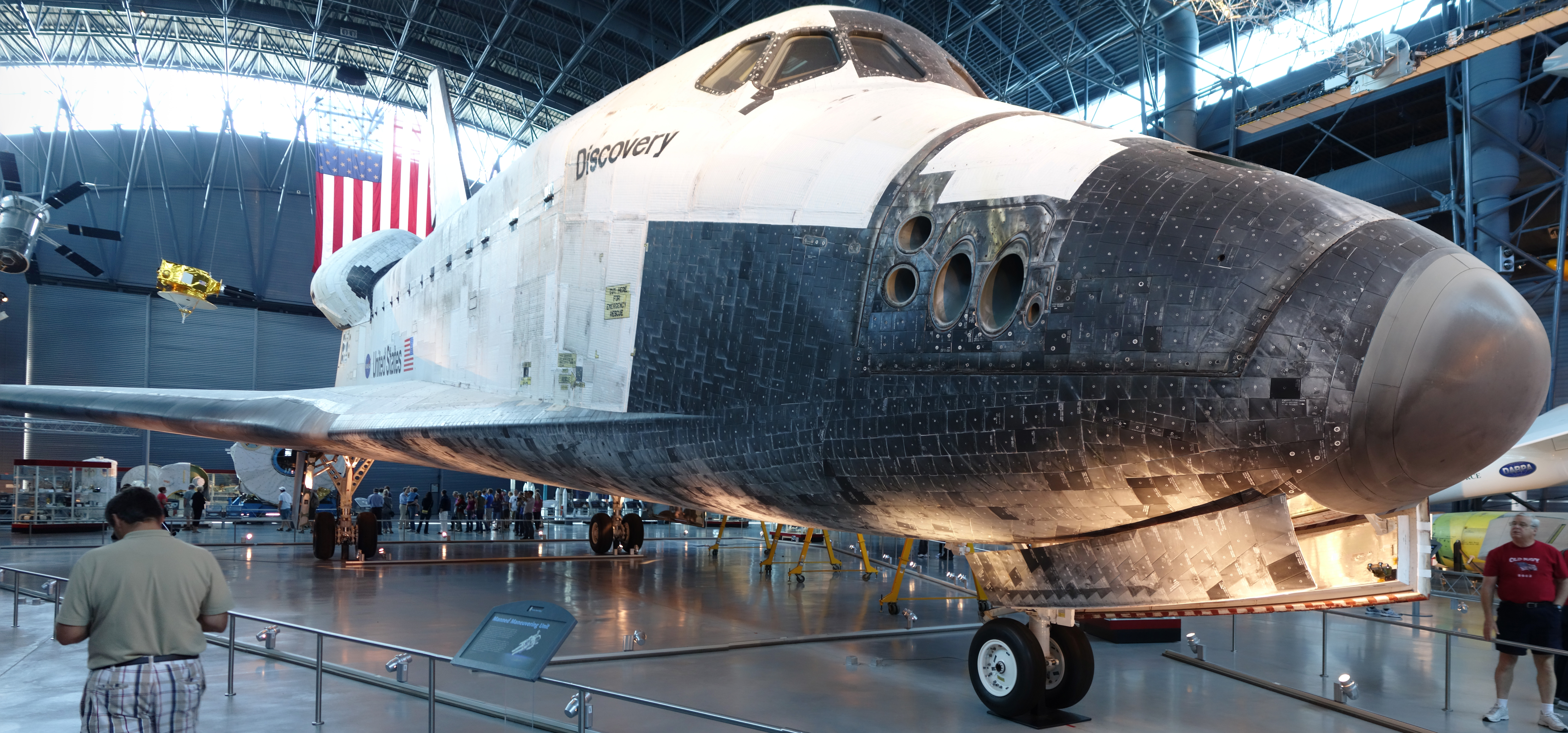
Enterprise and Discovery exchanged and Discovery on display at the National Air and Space Museum, Steven F. Udvar-Hazy Center

== Flights ==
By its last mission, Discovery had flown 149 million mi (240 million km) in 39 missions, completed 5,830 orbits, and spent 365 days in orbit over 27 years. Discovery flew more flights than any other Orbiter Shuttle, including four in 1985 alone. Discovery flew both "return to flight" missions after the Challenger and Columbia disasters: STS-26 in 1988, STS-114 in 2005, and STS-121 in 2006. Discovery flew the ante-penultimate mission of the Space Shuttle program, STS-133, having launched on February 24, 2011. Endeavour flew STS-134 and Atlantis performed STS-135, NASA's last Space Shuttle mission. On February 24, 2011, Space Shuttle Discovery launched from Kennedy Space Center's Launch Complex 39-A to begin its final orbital flight.

=== Flights listing ===
#	Date	Designation	Notes	Length of journey
1	August 30, 1984	STS-41-D	First Discovery mission: Judith Resnik became second American woman in Space. Three communications satellites were put into orbit, including LEASAT F2.	6 days, 00 hours, 56 minutes, 04 seconds
2	November 8, 1984	STS-51-A	Launched two and rescued two communications satellites including LEASAT F1.	7 days, 23 hours, 44 minutes, 56 seconds
3	January 24, 1985	STS-51-C	Launched DOD Magnum ELINT satellite.	3 days, 01 hours, 33 minutes, 23 seconds-
4	April 12, 1985	STS-51-D	Launched two communications satellites including LEASAT F3. Carried first incumbent United States member of Congress into space, Senator Jake Garn (R–Utah)	6 days, 23 hours, 55 minutes, 23 seconds
5	June 17, 1985	STS-51-G	Launched two communications satellites, Sultan Salman al-Saud becomes first Saudi Arabian in space.	7 days, 01 hours, 38 minutes, 52 seconds
6	August 27, 1985	STS-51-I	Launched two communications satellites including LEASAT F4. Recovered, repaired, and redeployed LEASAT F3.	7 days, 02 hours, 17 minutes, 42 seconds
7	September 29, 1988	STS-26	Return to flight after Space Shuttle Challenger disaster, launched TDRS-3.	4 days, 01 hours, 00 minutes, 11 seconds
8	March 13, 1989	STS-29	Launched TDRS-4.	4 days, 23 hours, 38 minutes, 52 seconds
9	November 22, 1989	STS-33	Launched DOD Magnum ELINT satellite.	5 days, 00 hours, 06 minutes, 49 seconds
10	April 24, 1990	STS-31	Launch of Hubble Space Telescope (HST).	5 days, 01 hours, 16 minutes, 06 seconds
11	October 6, 1990	STS-41	Launch of Ulysses.	4 days, 02 hours, 10 minutes, 04 seconds
12	April 28, 1991	STS-39	Launched DOD Air Force Program-675 (AFP-675) satellite.	8 days, 07 hours, 22 minutes, 23 seconds
13	September 12, 1991	STS-48	Upper Atmosphere Research Satellite (UARS).	5 days, 08 hours, 27 minutes, 38 seconds
14	January 22, 1992	STS-42	International Microgravity Laboratory-1 (IML-1).	8 days, 01 hours, 14 minutes, 44 seconds
15	December 2, 1992	STS-53	Department of Defense payload.	7 days, 07 hours, 19 minutes, 47 seconds
16	April 8, 1993	STS-56	Atmospheric Laboratory (ATLAS-2).	9 days, 06 hours, 08 minutes, 24 seconds
17	September 12, 1993	STS-51	Advanced Communications Technology Satellite (ACTS).	9 days, 20 hours, 11 minutes, 11 seconds
18	February 3, 1994	STS-60	First Shuttle-Mir mission; Wake Shield Facility (WSF). First Russian launched in an American spacecraft (Sergei Krikalev).	8 days, 07 hours, 09 minutes, 22 seconds
19	September 9, 1994	STS-64	LIDAR In-Space Technology Experiment (LITE).	10 days, 22 hours, 49 minutes, 57 seconds
20	February 3, 1995	STS-63	Rendezvous with Mir space station. First female shuttle pilot Eileen Collins.	8 days, 06 hours, 29 minutes, 36 seconds
21	July 13, 1995	STS-70	Launched TDRS-7.	8 days, 22 hours, 20 minutes, 05 seconds
22	February 11, 1997	STS-82	Servicing Hubble Space Telescope (HST) (HSM-2).	9 days, 23 hours, 38 minutes, 09 seconds
23	August 7, 1997	STS-85	Cryogenic Infrared Spectrometers and Telescopes (CRISTA).	11 days, 20 hours, 28 minutes, 07 seconds
24	June 2, 1998	STS-91	Final Shuttle/Mir Docking Mission.	9 days, 19 hours, 55 minutes, 01 seconds
25	October 29, 1998	STS-95	SPACEHAB, second flight of John Glenn, who was 77 years of age at that time, the oldest man in space and third incumbent member of Congress to enter space. Pedro Duque became the first Spaniard in space.	8 days, 21 hours, 44 minutes, 56 seconds
26	May 27, 1999	STS-96	First Space Shuttle mission to dock with the International Space Station	9 days, 19 hours, 13 minutes, 57 seconds
27	December 19, 1999	STS-103	Servicing Hubble Space Telescope (HST) (HSM-3A).	7 days, 23 hours, 11 minutes, 34 seconds
28	October 11, 2000	STS-92	International Space Station Assembly Flight (carried and assembled the Z1 truss); 100th Shuttle mission.	12 days, 21 hours, 43 minutes, 47 seconds
29	March 8, 2001	STS-102	International Space Station crew rotation flight (Expedition 1 and Expedition 2)	12 days, 19 hours, 51 minutes, 57 seconds
30	August 10, 2001	STS-105	International Space Station crew and supplies delivery (Expedition 2 and Expedition 3)	11 days 21 hours, 13 minutes, 52 seconds
31	July 26, 2005	STS-114	First "Return To Flight" mission since Space Shuttle Columbia disaster; International Space Station (ISS) supplies delivery, new safety procedures testing and evaluation, Multi-Purpose Logistics Module (MPLM) Raffaello.	13 days, 21 hours, 33 minutes, 00 seconds
32	July 4, 2006	STS-121	Second "Return To Flight" mission since the Space Shuttle Columbia disaster, owing to concerns surrounding foam debris from the external tank during STS-114; International Space Station (ISS) supplies delivery, test new safety and repair techniques.	12 days, 18 hours, 37 minutes, 54 seconds
33	December 9, 2006	STS-116	ISS crew rotation and assembly (carries and assembles the P5 truss segment); Last flight to launch on pad 39-B; First night launch since Space Shuttle Columbia disaster.	12 days, 20 hours, 44 minutes, 16 seconds
34	October 23, 2007	STS-120	ISS crew rotation and assembly (carries and assembles the Harmony module).	15 days, 02 hours, 23 minutes, 55 seconds
35	May 31, 2008	STS-124	ISS crew rotation and assembly (carries and assembles the Kibō JEM PM module).	13 days, 18 hours, 13 minutes, 07 seconds
36	March 15, 2009	STS-119	International Space Station crew rotation and assembly of a fourth starboard truss segment (ITS S6) and a fourth set of solar arrays and batteries. Also replaced a failed unit for a system that converts urine to drinking water.	12 days, 19 hours, 29 minutes, 33 seconds
37	August 28, 2009	STS-128	International Space Station crew rotation and ISS resupply using the Leonardo Multi-Purpose Logistics Module. Also carried the C.O.L.B.E.R.T treadmill named after Stephen Colbert	13 days 20 hours, 54 minutes, 40 seconds
38	April 5, 2010	STS-131	ISS resupply using the Leonardo Multi-Purpose Logistics Module. The mission also marked the first time that four women were in space and the first time that two Japanese astronauts were together on a space station. Longest mission for this Orbiter.	15 days 2 hours, 47 minutes 11 seconds‡
39	February 24, 2011	STS-133	The mission launched at 4:53 pm EST on February 24, was carrying the Permanent Multipurpose Module (PMM) Leonardo, the ELC-4 and Robonaut 2 to the ISS. Final flight of Discovery.	12 days 19 hours, 4 minutes, 50 seconds

‡ Longest shuttle mission for Discovery
– shortest shuttle mission for Discovery

=== Mission and tribute insignias ===
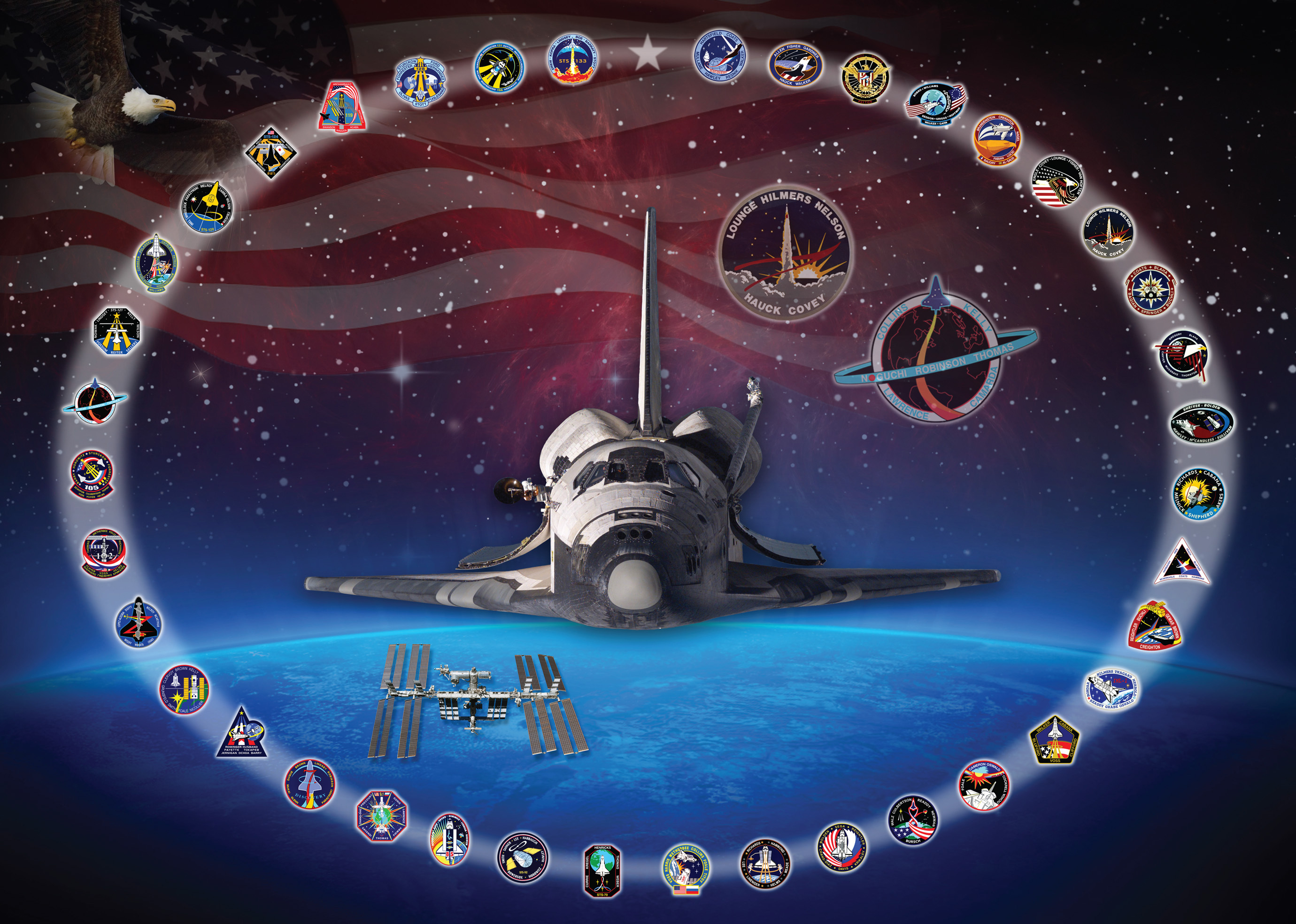
NASA Orbiter Tribute for Space Shuttle Discovery

Mission insignia for Discovery flights
STS-41-D	STS-51-A	STS-51-C	STS-51-D	STS-51-G	STS-51-I	STS-26	STS-29
STS-33	STS-31	STS-41	STS-39	STS-48	STS-42	STS-53	STS-56
STS-51	STS-60	STS-64	STS-63	STS-70	STS-82	STS-85	STS-91
STS-95	STS-96	STS-103	STS-92	STS-102	STS-105	STS-114	STS-121
STS-116	STS-120	STS-124	STS-119	STS-128	STS-131	STS-133	

== Flow directors ==
The Flow Director was responsible for the overall preparation of the shuttle for launch and processing it after landing, and remained permanently assigned to head the spacecraft's ground crew while the astronaut flight crews changed for every mission. Each shuttle's Flow Director was supported by a Vehicle Manager for the same spacecraft. Space Shuttle Discovery's Flow Directors were:

- Until 01/1991: John J. "Tip" Talone Jr. (afterwards Flow Director for Endeavour)
- 01/1991 – 09/1992: John C. "Chris" Fairey
- 09/1992 – 10/1996: David A. King
- 10/1996 – 05/2000: W. Scott Cilento
- 12/2000 – 03/2011: Stephanie S. Stilson

== Gallery ==
The launch of STS-41-D, Discovery's first mission	STS-121 launched on July 4, 2006 – the only Shuttle to launch on Independence Day	STS-119 on the night of March 11, 2009	Discovery sits atop a modified Boeing 747 as it touches down at the Kennedy Space Center following STS-128	Discovery lands after its first flight, STS-41-D
Discovery performing the Rendezvous pitch maneuver during STS-114 prior to docking with the International Space Station	The Space Shuttle Discovery soon after landing at the end of STS-114	Modified Boeing 747 carrying Discovery after STS-128	STS-124 comes to a close as Discovery lands at the Kennedy Space Center	Discovery's final touchdown on Kennedy Space Center's runway, concluding the STS-133 mission and Discovery's 27-year career

== See also ==
- List of human spaceflights
- List of Space Shuttle crews
- List of Space Shuttle missions
- Timeline of Space Shuttle missions
