= Josephine Santiago-Bond =

American engineer

- Alma mater: University of the Philippines; South Dakota State University
- Occupation: Systems engineer
- Employer: Daktronics; NASA

Josephine Santiago-Bond, a Filipina-American systems engineer, is the creator and chief of the Advanced Engineering Development Branch at National Aeronautics and Space Administration (NASA). She contributed to the 2017 Regolith and Environment Science and Oxygen and Lunar Volatiles Extraction (RESOLVE) project at NASA's Kennedy Space Center (KSC), which aimed to map lunar compounds. She also heads the Safety and Mission Assurance department's institutional division at KSC.

== Personal life ==
Santiago-Bond was born in the U.S. to Filipino parents. Her parents studied in the U.S. and returned to the Philippines where Santiago-Bond grew up with two older sisters; one of them pursued veterinary medicine and the other pursued human medicine. She said she never felt pressured by her parents to push for similar fields.

== Education ==
Santiago-Bond attended Assumption Antipolo and Philippine Science High School. As a senior, she was inspired by her friend Rose, a freshman at the University of the Philippines (UP), to study at the UP College of Engineering, which offered promising employment opportunities to graduate students interested in telecommunications. Santiago-Bond went on to attend college at the University of the Philippines and received a Bachelors of Science in Electronics and Communications. After traveling to South Dakota due to family-related decisions, she landed her first engineering job at Daktronics, an American electronics company. Simultaneously, she pursued her master's degree in electrical engineering at South Dakota State University.

== Career ==
Santiago-Bond has held multiple positions throughout her career. While working for Daktronics, Inc., she also served as a research assistant with an advisor who received funding from NASA's Space Grant Consortium. She finished her studies at South Dakota State University in 2004 and worked as a graduate intern at NASA's Kennedy Space Center (KSC) until 2005, when she received her master's degree. She then started working at KSC as a full-time electrical engineer. She contributed to the formulation and launch of the Ares I-X in 2009, and she was part of NASA's 2012 Systems Engineering Leadership Development Program (SELDP), where she worked at the Ames Research Center on the LADEE lunar missions. She worked on the 2017 Regolith and Environment Science and Oxygen and Lunar Volatiles Extraction (RESOLVE) project at KSC, which aimed to map water ice and other compounds on the moon.

Santiago-Bond became the chief of the newly formed Advanced Engineering Development Branch that she helped create and that had worked on 70 different projects as of 2019 As head of the branch, she is in charge of more than 20 engineers and a handful of interns. After 17 years of working for NASA, she is also the chief of KSC's Safety and Mission Assurance department's institutional division and overlooks the operations of about fifty employees. Santiago-Bond has said that NASA has helped her grow as a leader in her shift from electronic to systems engineering, especially as a woman. Eager for females to stand out in the workplace, she affirmed, "It's very important for women to lift each other up. It's important for women to break new ground and pave the way."

== Research and publications ==
As part of the RESOLVE (Regolith and Environment Science and Oxygen and Lunar Volatiles Extraction) payload project, Santiago-Bond and some coworkers planned an exploration mission of lunar compounds, such as water ice, that would be mapped via a rover. The RESOLVE project aims to enact "in situ resource utilization" as a way to reduce or eliminate materials that must be brought up from Earth and placed on the Moon's surface for human use. Chemical/mineral mapping of the Moon's surface can be accomplished using spectrophotometric measurements. NASA's rover will implement the Oxygen Volatile Extraction Node (OVEN) and the Lunar Advanced Volatile Analysis system (LAVA) in order to extract lunar volatile components and allow for evaluation by means of gas chromatography (GC), respectively.

LAVA's Fluid Subsystem, FSS, was studied by Santiago-Bond along with an intern and other mentors to better understand fluid dynamics, especially when exposed to a lunar vacuum. An experimental set-up was constructed to mimic the flow of the GC unit, and various transfer line inner diameters were used for comparison. Additionally, in another experiment, these same transfer lines were connected to an Inficon Micro GC 3000; flow rates were found to decrease with smaller transfer lines. Experimental patterns revealed that vacuum conditions had minimal influence on the identification of chemical compounds and that gas chromatography can be operated in a variety of conditions. These findings were published in 2015 by Santiago-Bond and a NASA intern, Marianne Gonzalez.

In another study, Santiago-Bond troubleshot the baseline mass spectrometer of the LAVA subsystem called OI Analytical (OIA MS) since it had issues in the past. Tests were performed at the Kennedy Space Center with Beau Peacock and Janine Captain as well as Evan Niedholdt from JPL and Gottfried. Conducted over the course of 10 weeks, these tests monitored the chamber health and facilitated the use of another mass spectrometer in addition to the OIA MS to aid in detecting anomalies and possible causes for them. Santiago-Bond's contributions were mentioned in a NASA internship report in 2015.

== Recognition ==
Santiago-Bond has received many accolades over the course of her career. She was endorsed as a "speaker who can inspire learners" at a press conference at Sta. Marcela Central School, the oldest public school in Apayao province in the Philippines, by Department of Education Secretary Leonor Briones in 2019. She was also a guest speaker at the book launch of Disrupt 3.0. Filipina Women: Rising on March 28, 2019, which commemorated National Women's Month at the Philippine Embassy in Washington, DC. In October of 2021, the U.S. Embassy in the Philippines partnered with the Philippine Space Agency (PhilSA) to present two webinars featuring female NASA scientists, of which Santiago-Bond was one. In the first webinar held on October 4, she described the experiences of women scientists, astronauts, and engineers in space. She was also applauded by Vaughn College for her outstanding contributions to the field of engineering in May 2022.
