= Kennedy Space Center Launch Complex 39B =

Historic launch pad operated by NASA since 1969

Launch Complex 39B
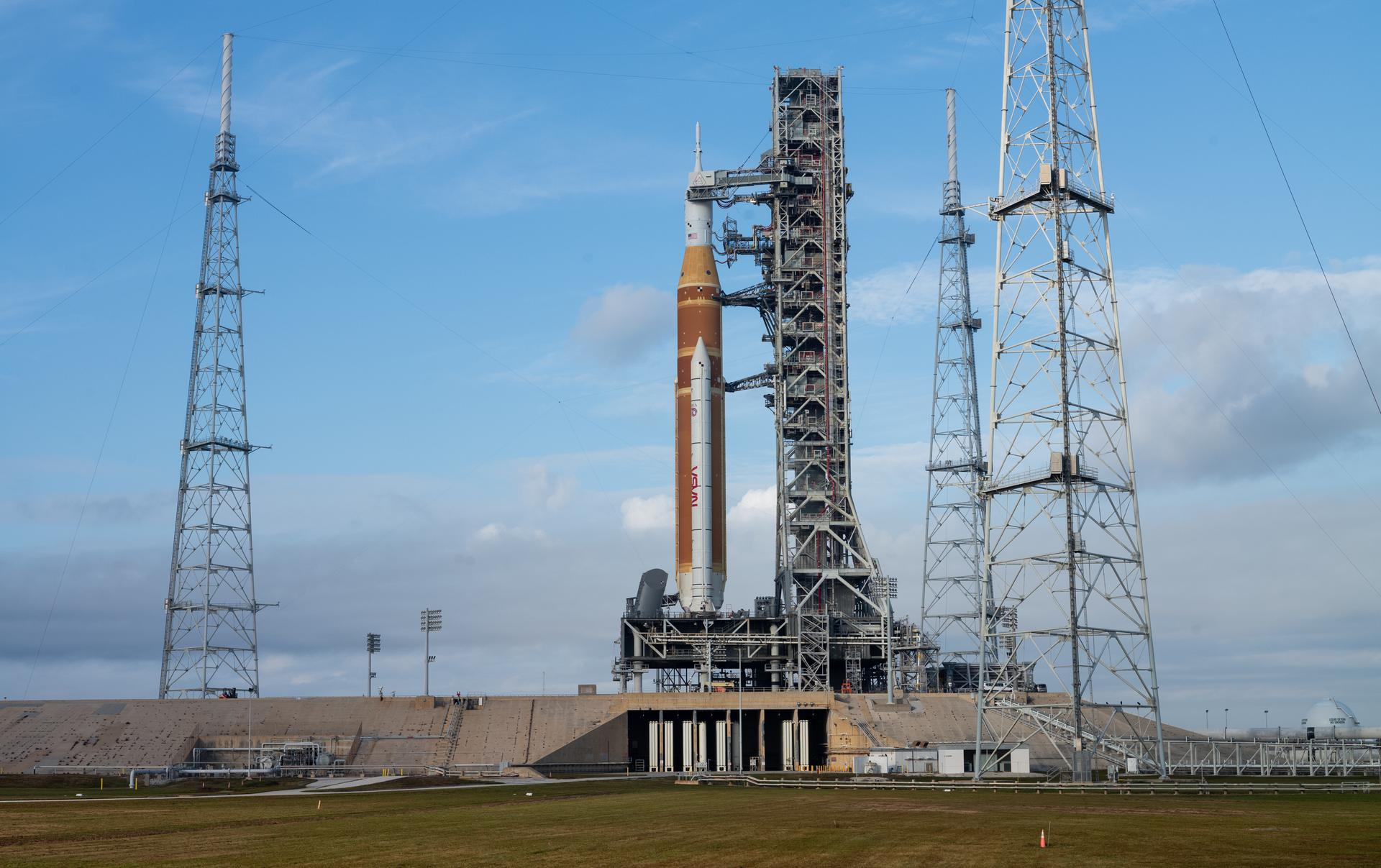
- LC-39B in January 2026, with the Space Launch System used for Artemis II sitting atop the pad
- Interactive map of Launch Complex 39B
- Launch site: Kennedy Space Center
- Location: Merritt Island, Florida
- Coordinates: 28°37′38″N 80°37′15″W
- Time zone: UTC−05:00 (EST)
  - Summer (DST): UTC−04:00 (EDT)
- Short name: LC-39B
- Established: 1962; 64 years ago
- Operator: NASA
- Orbital inclination range: 28–62°
Launch history
- Status: Active
- Launches: 61
- First launch: May 18, 1969; Saturn V (Apollo 10)
- Last launch: April 1, 2026; Space Launch System (Artemis II)
- Associated rockets: Current: Space Launch System; Retired: Saturn V, Saturn IB, Space Shuttle, Ares I-X; Plans cancelled: Ares I, OmegA
- Launch Complex 39--Pad B
- U.S. National Register of Historic Places
- Location within Florida Location within the United States
- Location: John F. Kennedy Space Center, Titusville, Florida
- Area: 160 acres (65 ha)
- Built: 1967-1968
- MPS: John F. Kennedy Space Center MPS
- NRHP reference No.: 99001639
- Added to NRHP: January 21, 2000

Launch sites at Cape Canaveral Space Force Station and Kennedy Space Center
Active pads
Inactive leased pads
Inactive unleased pads
Repurposed pads, not used for launches
1 LC-39B
2 LC-39A
3 LC-48
4 SLC-41
5 SLC-40
6 LC-47
7 SLC-37
8 LC-34
9 SLC-20
10 LC-19
11 LC-16
12 LC-15
13 LC-14
14 LC-13 (LZ-2)
15 LC-12
16 LC-11
17 LC-36
18 LC-1, LC-2, LC-3, and LC-4
19 SLC-46
20 LC-21 and LC-22
21 LC-31 and LC-32
22 LC-18
23 SLC-17
24 LC-26
25 LC-5 and LC-6
26 LC-30
27 LC-25
28 LC-29

Launch Complex 39B (LC-39B) is the second of Launch Complex 39's three launch pads, located at NASA's Kennedy Space Center in Merritt Island, Florida. The pad, along with Launch Complex 39A, was designed for the Saturn V launch vehicle, then the United States' most powerful rocket. Typically used to launch NASA's crewed spaceflight missions since the late 1960s, the pad has been configured for use by the agency's Space Launch System rocket, a Shuttle-derived launch vehicle which is used in the Artemis program and subsequent Moon to Mars campaigns. The pad was also leased by NASA to aerospace company Northrop Grumman, for use as a launch site for their Shuttle-derived OmegA launch vehicle, for National Security Space Launch flights and commercial launches, before the OmegA program was cancelled.

== History ==
=== Apollo and Apollo Applications (1962–1975) ===
In 1961, President Kennedy proposed to Congress the goal of landing a man on the Moon by the end of the decade. Congressional approval led to the launch of the Apollo program, which required a massive expansion of NASA operations, including an expansion of launch operations from the Cape to adjacent Merritt Island to the north and west.

Launch Complex 39B was designed to handle launches of the Saturn V rocket, the largest and most powerful launch vehicle, which would propel Apollo spacecraft to the Moon. Launch Complex 39B's inaugural launch in May 1969 was also that of the only Saturn V to launch from the pad; SA-505, used to launch the Apollo 10 mission.

After the Apollo 17 mission in 1972, Pad 39B was used for Saturn IB launches. The Mobile Launchers were then modified for the Saturn IB rocket, by adding a "milk-stool" extension platform to the launch pedestal, so that the S-IVB upper stage and Apollo spacecraft swing arms would reach their targets. These were used for three crewed Skylab flights and the Apollo–Soyuz, since the Saturn IB pads 34 and 37 at Cape Canaveral had been decommissioned.

=== Space Shuttle (1977–2006) ===
With the advent of the Space Shuttle program in the early 1980s, the original structure of the launch pads were remodeled for the needs of the Space Shuttle. Pad 39A hosted all Space Shuttle launches until January 1986, when Space Shuttle Challenger would become the first to launch from pad 39B during the ill-fated STS-51-L mission, which ended with the destruction of Challenger and the death of the mission's crew a minute into the flight.

Launch Complex 39B hosted 53 Space Shuttle launches until December 2006, when Discovery launched from the pad for the final time during the STS-116 mission. The program's remaining flights launched from pad 39A. To support the final Shuttle mission to the Hubble Space Telescope STS-125 launched from pad 39A in May 2009, Endeavour was placed on 39B if needed to launch the STS-400 rescue mission.

=== Constellation and Artemis (from 2007) ===
Launch Complex 39B would subsequently be reconfigured for crewed Ares I launches as part of the Constellation program; the Ares I-X mission launched a prototype Ares I from 39B in October 2009, prior to the program's cancellation the following year.

On November 16, 2022, at 06:47:44 UTC, the Space Launch System (SLS) was launched from Complex 39B as part of the Artemis I mission. It was used again for the Artemis II mission on April 1st, 2026 at 22:35:12 UTC.

== Current status ==
After the Ares I-X test flight in 2009, NASA removed the Fixed Service Structure (FSS) from Pad 39B, returning the location to an Apollo-like "clean pad" design for the first time since 1977. This approach is intended to make the pad available to multiple types of vehicles that will arrive at the pad with service structures on the mobile launcher platform, as opposed to using fixed structures on the pad. The LH_{2}, LOX, and water tanks used for the sound suppression system are the only structures left from the Space Shuttle era.

In 2014, NASA announced that it would make LC-39B available to commercial users during times when it is not needed by the Space Launch System. NASA subsequently agreed to allow Orbital ATK to use LC-39B for their OmegA launch vehicle. However Northrop Grumman, who absorbed Orbital ATK in June 2018, cancelled the development of OmegA in September 2020 before any launches had taken place; SLS will therefore remain the only user of LC-39B for the foreseeable future.

As of November 2022, LC-39B manages the Space Launch System (SLS)'s processing and launch operations, as part of the first phase of a five-phase project, were being completed. The second phase of this project is currently budgeted for $89.2 million. In 2024, NASA installed an Emergency Egress System in the event of an emergency during the launch countdown, consisting of four gravity-powered cable cars which automatically leave the launch pad at ignition, so as to avoid the plume load.

== Launch statistics ==
- Saturn V
- Saturn IB
- Space Shuttle
- Ares I
- SLS

=== Apollo and Apollo Applications ===
All flights operated by NASA.

No.	Date	Time (UTC)	Launch vehicle	Serial number	Mission	Result	Remarks
1	18 May 1969	16:49	Saturn V	SA-505	Apollo 10 (CSM Charlie Brown and LM Snoopy)	Success	First launch, first crewed launch, and only Saturn V launch from LC-39B. Launch was conducted at the pad to practice high Saturn V launch cadence.
2	25 May 1973	13:00	Saturn IB	SA-206	Skylab 2	Success	First visit to Skylab, making emergency repairs sustained during space station's launch. First launch of the Saturn IB from LC-39B, and the first launch of the Saturn IB since Apollo 7 in 1968.
3	28 July 1973	11:10	Saturn IB	SA-207	Skylab 3	Success	Second visit to Skylab.
4	16 November 1973	14:01	Saturn IB	SA-208	Skylab 4	Success	Last visit to Skylab. Set American record for time in space that stayed until the advent of ISS expeditions.
5	15 July 1975	19:50	Saturn IB	SA-210	Apollo–Soyuz	Success	The Apollo component of the Apollo–Soyuz Test Project, complementing Soyuz 19. First crewed international spaceflight for NASA, and last flight of the Saturn IB, Saturn family, and Apollo CSM.

=== Space Shuttle ===
All flights operated by NASA.

No.	Date	Time (UTC)	Launch vehicle	Shuttle	Mission	Result	Remarks
6	28 January 1986	16:38	Space Shuttle	Challenger	STS-51-L	Failure	First Space Shuttle launch from LC-39B. Intended to launch and deploy TDRS-B for the Tracking and Data Relay Satellite System. A failure of the solid rocket booster led to breakup 73 seconds after launch, causing the Space Shuttle Challenger disaster.
7	28 September 1988	15:37	Space Shuttle	Discovery	STS-26	Success	First Space Shuttle launch following the Challenger disaster. Launch and deployment of TDRS-3 (as TDRS-C) for the Tracking and Data Relay Satellite System.
8	2 December 1988	14:30	Space Shuttle	Atlantis	STS-27	Success	Classified Department of Defense mission. Deployment of Lacrosse satellite, also known as USA-34. Shuttle's thermal protection system was extensively damaged during liftoff, but survived reentry.
9	13 March 1989	14:37	Space Shuttle	Discovery	STS-29	Success	Launch and deployment of TDRS-4 (as TDRS-D) for the Tracking and Data Relay Satellite System.
10	4 May 1989	14:46	Space Shuttle	Atlantis	STS-30	Success	Launch and deployment of Magellan, aiming to study and create a radar map of Venus.
11	8 August 1989	12:37	Space Shuttle	Columbia	STS-28	Success	DoD mission. Deployment of SDS satellite and SSF satellite, also known as USA-40 and USA-41 respectively.
12	18 October 1989	16:53	Space Shuttle	Atlantis	STS-34	Success	Launch and deployment Galileo. Part of the Large Strategic Science Missions, designed to study Jupiter and its moons. First spacecraft to enter orbit of Jupiter and of an outer planet, and first spacecraft to enter the atmosphere of a gas giant with atmospheric probe. First Shuttle launch with an RTG.
13	23 November 1989	00:23	Space Shuttle	Discovery	STS-33	Success	DoD mission. Deployment of Magnum satellite, also known as USA-48.
14	12 April 1990	12:33	Space Shuttle	Discovery	STS-31	Success	Launch and deployment of the Hubble Space Telescope. Part of the Large Strategic Science Missions, a space telescope designed to conduct optical astronomy. Collaboration between NASA and ESA. Was serviced five times over the following 20 years.
15	6 October 1990	11:47	Space Shuttle	Discovery	STS-41	Success	Launch and deployment of Ulysses. Collaboration between NASA and ESA, designed to study the Sun from various inclinations. First spacecraft to enter polar heliocentric orbit, thanks to a gravity assist from Jupiter.
16	2 December 1990	06:49	Space Shuttle	Columbia	STS-35	Success	
17	5 April 1991	14:22	Space Shuttle	Atlantis	STS-37	Success	Launch and deployment of the Compton Gamma Ray Observatory. Part of the Large Strategic Science Missions, a space telescope designed to conduct gamma-ray astronomy.
18	5 June 1991	13:24	Space Shuttle	Columbia	STS-40	Success	
19	7 May 1992	23:40	Space Shuttle	Endeavour	STS-49	Success	Maiden flight of Space Shuttle Endeavour. Servicing mission for Intelsat 603, following staging failure during launch on a Commercial Titan III in 1990. Only spacewalk so far to feature three astronauts.
20	31 July 1992	13:56	Space Shuttle	Atlantis	STS-46	Success	
21	12 September 1992	14:23	Space Shuttle	Endeavour	STS-47	Success	
22	22 October 1992	17:09	Space Shuttle	Columbia	STS-52	Success	
23	13 January 1993	13:59	Space Shuttle	Endeavour	STS-54	Success	Launch and deployment of TDRS-6 (as TDRS-F) for the Tracking and Data Relay Satellite System.
24	8 April 1993	05:29	Space Shuttle	Discovery	STS-56	Success	
25	21 June 1993	13:07	Space Shuttle	Endeavour	STS-57	Success	
26	12 September 1993	11:45	Space Shuttle	Discovery	STS-51	Success	
27	18 October 1993	14:53	Space Shuttle	Columbia	STS-58	Success	
28	2 December 1993	09:27	Space Shuttle	Endeavour	STS-61	Success	Servicing mission for the Hubble Space Telescope. Notable for correcting its optics caused by incorrect mirror grounding made before launch.
29	4 March 1994	13:53	Space Shuttle	Columbia	STS-62	Success	
30	9 September 1994	22:22	Space Shuttle	Discovery	STS-64	Success	
31	3 November 1994	16:59	Space Shuttle	Atlantis	STS-66	Success	
32	3 February 1995	05:22	Space Shuttle	Discovery	STS-63	Success	First shuttle mission to the space station Mir. Rendezvoused, but did not dock.
33	13 July 1995	13:41	Space Shuttle	Discovery	STS-70	Success	Launch and deployment of TDRS-7 (as TDRS-G). Last Shuttle launch for the Tracking and Data Relay Satellite System.
34	20 October 1995	13:53	Space Shuttle	Columbia	STS-73	Success	
35	11 January 1996	09:41	Space Shuttle	Endeavour	STS-72	Success	Retrieval mission for NASDA's Space Flyer Unit, launched on an H-II from Tanegashima ten months before.
36	22 February 1996	20:18	Space Shuttle	Columbia	STS-75	Success	
37	22 March 1996	08:13	Space Shuttle	Atlantis	STS-76	Success	Docking with Mir.
38	19 May 1996	10:30	Space Shuttle	Endeavour	STS-77	Success	
39	20 June 1996	14:49	Space Shuttle	Columbia	STS-78	Success	
40	19 November 1996	19:55	Space Shuttle	Columbia	STS-80	Success	Longest ever Space Shuttle flight, at 17 days and 15 hours.
41	12 January 1997	09:27	Space Shuttle	Atlantis	STS-81	Success	Docking with Mir.
42	19 November 1997	19:46	Space Shuttle	Columbia	STS-87	Success	
43	17 April 1998	18:19	Space Shuttle	Columbia	STS-90	Success	Final Spacelab flight.
44	29 October 1998	19:19	Space Shuttle	Discovery	STS-95	Success	Carried senator and Mercury-Atlas 6 veteran John Glenn into orbit.
45	27 May 1999	10:49	Space Shuttle	Discovery	STS-96	Success	First non-assembly Space Shuttle flight to the International Space Station.
46	23 July 1999	04:31	Space Shuttle	Columbia	STS-93	Success	Launch and deployment of the Chandra X-Ray Observatory. Part of the Large Strategic Science Missions, a space telescope designed to conduct x-ray astronomy.
47	19 December 1999	00:50	Space Shuttle	Discovery	STS-103	Success	Servicing mission for the Hubble Space Telescope.
48	8 September 2000	12:45	Space Shuttle	Atlantis	STS-106	Success	Docking with the ISS.
49	1 December 2000	03:06	Space Shuttle	Endeavour	STS-97	Success	ISS assembly flight, adding the P6 solar array and radiators.
50	8 March 2001	11:42	Space Shuttle	Discovery	STS-102	Success	Docking with the ISS.
51	12 July 2001	09:03	Space Shuttle	Atlantis	STS-104	Success	ISS assembly flight, adding the Quest Joint Airlock.
52	5 December 2001	22:19	Space Shuttle	Endeavour	STS-108	Success	Docking with the ISS.
53	8 April 2002	20:44	Space Shuttle	Atlantis	STS-110	Success	ISS assembly flight, adding the S0 truss.
54	7 October 2002	19:45	Space Shuttle	Atlantis	STS-112	Success	ISS assembly flight, adding the S1 truss.
55	26 July 2005	14:39	Space Shuttle	Discovery	STS-114	Success	Docking with the ISS. First Space Shuttle flight following the Columbia disaster in 2003.
56	4 July 2006	18:37	Space Shuttle	Discovery	STS-121	Success	Docking with the ISS.
57	9 September 2006	15:14	Space Shuttle	Atlantis	STS-115	Success	ISS assembly flight, adding the P3/P4 truss and solar arrays.
58	10 December 2006	00:47	Space Shuttle	Discovery	STS-116	Success	ISS assembly flight, adding the P5 truss. Final Space Shuttle flight from LC-39B.

=== Constellation and Artemis ===
All flights operated by NASA.

No.	Date	Time (UTC)	Launch vehicle	Configuration	Spacecraft	Mission	Result	Remarks
59	28 October 2009	15:30	Ares I	Ares I-X	Boilerplate	Ares I-X	Success	Suborbital launch. Carried a boilerplate upper stage and Orion spacecraft. Only launch of the Ares I and of the Constellation Program before their cancellations in 2010. First uncrewed launch from LC-39B.
60	16 November 2022	06:47	Space Launch System	SLS Block 1	Orion CM-002	Artemis I	Success	Maiden flight of SLS and first launch of the Artemis Program. Inaugural flight of a complete Orion spacecraft. First flight of a crewable spacecraft to the Moon since Apollo 17 in 1972, and first 39B launch beyond low Earth orbit since Apollo 10 in 1969.
61	1 April 2026	22:35	Space Launch System	SLS Block 1	Orion CM-003 Integrity	Artemis II	Success	First crewed flight of SLS, the Orion spacecraft, and the Artemis Program. First crewed flight to the Moon since Apollo 17 in 1972, and first crewed launch from LC-39B since STS-116 in 2006. Set crewed distance record from Earth, surpassing Apollo 13 in 1970. Carried Victor Glover, Christina Koch, and Jeremy Hansen, respectively the first person of color, woman, and non-American to travel beyond LEO.

=== Upcoming launches ===
Date	Launch vehicle	Mission
June 2027	Space Launch System	Artemis III

== Gallery ==
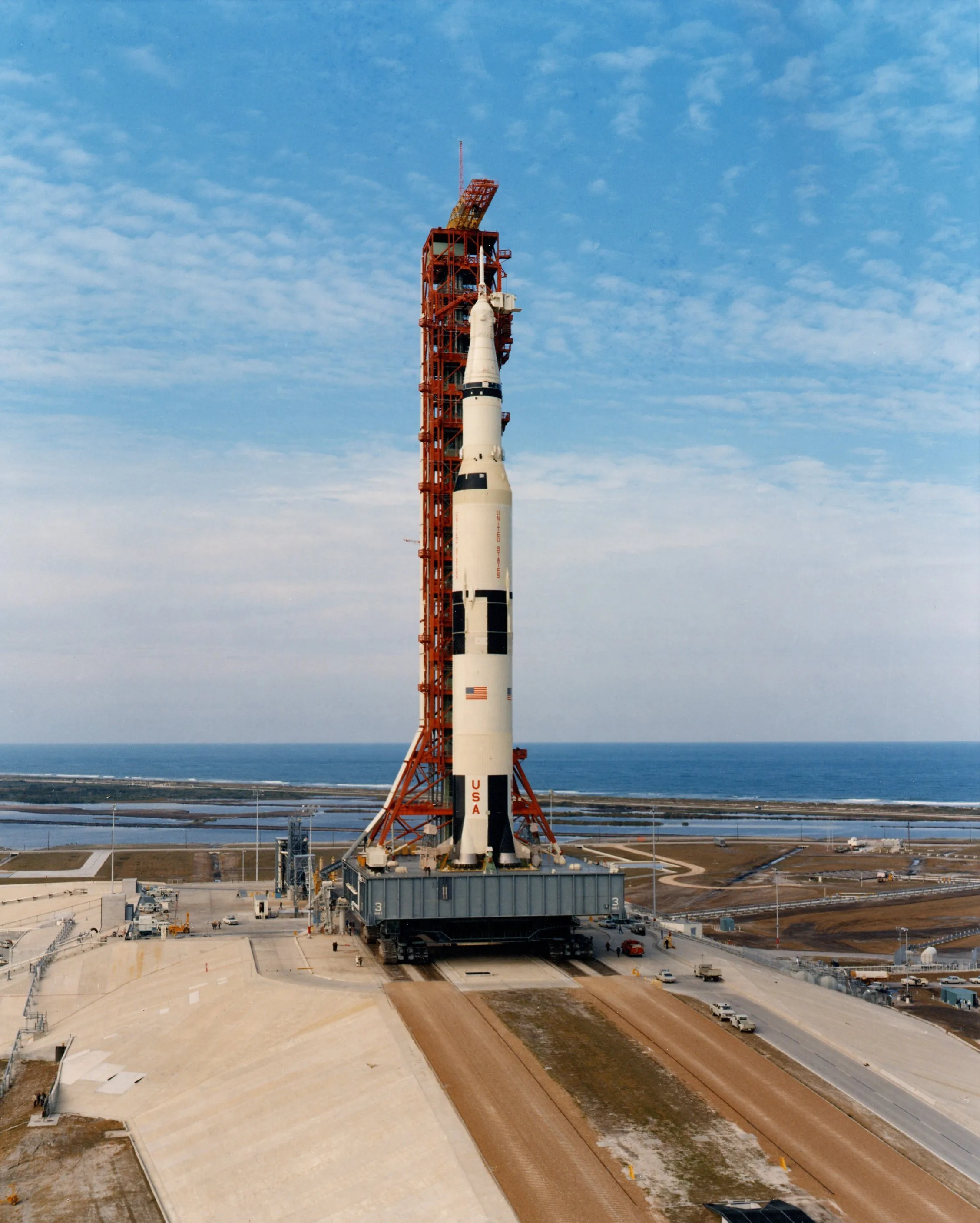
The Saturn V used for Apollo 10 at LC-39B (1969)

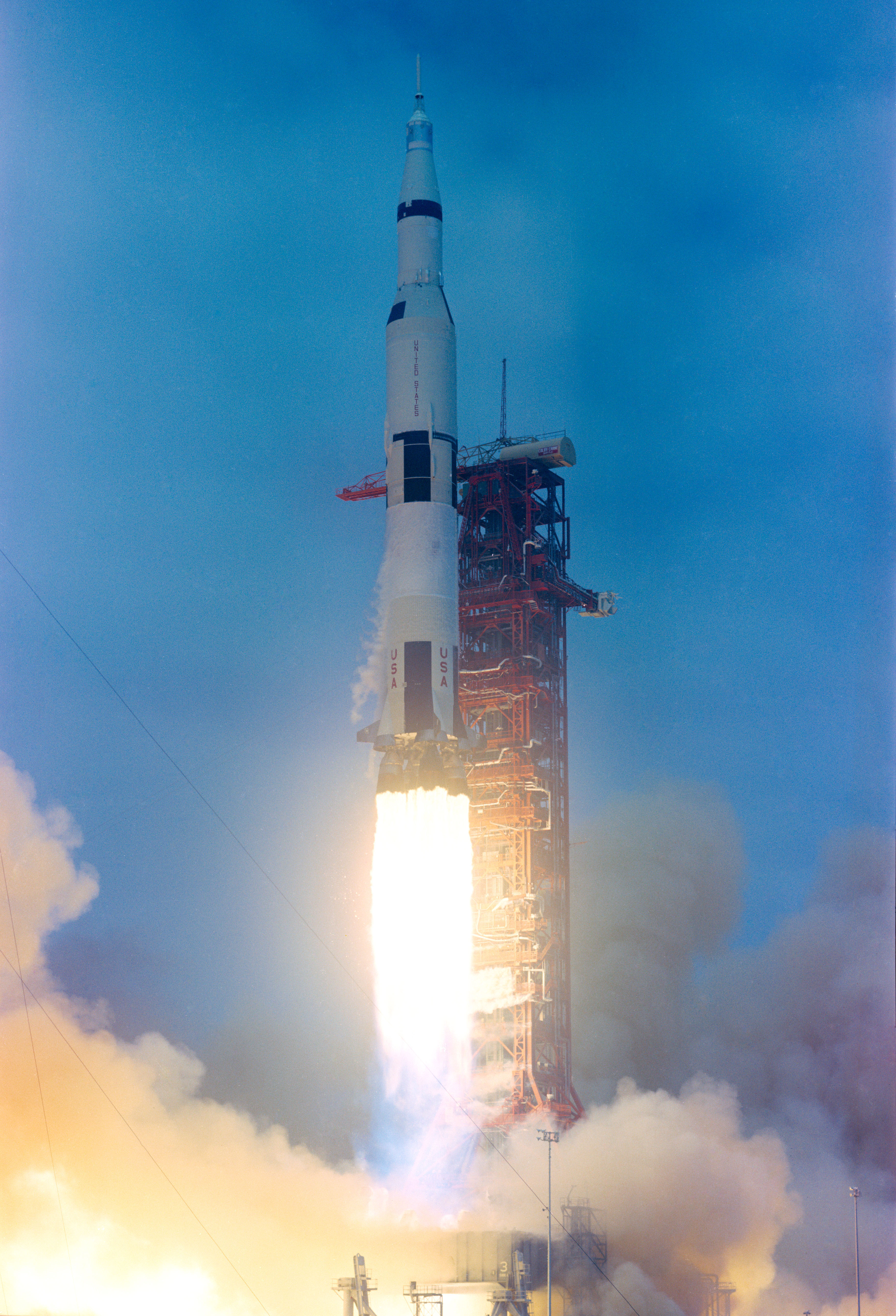
Apollo 10 launches from LC-39B (1969)

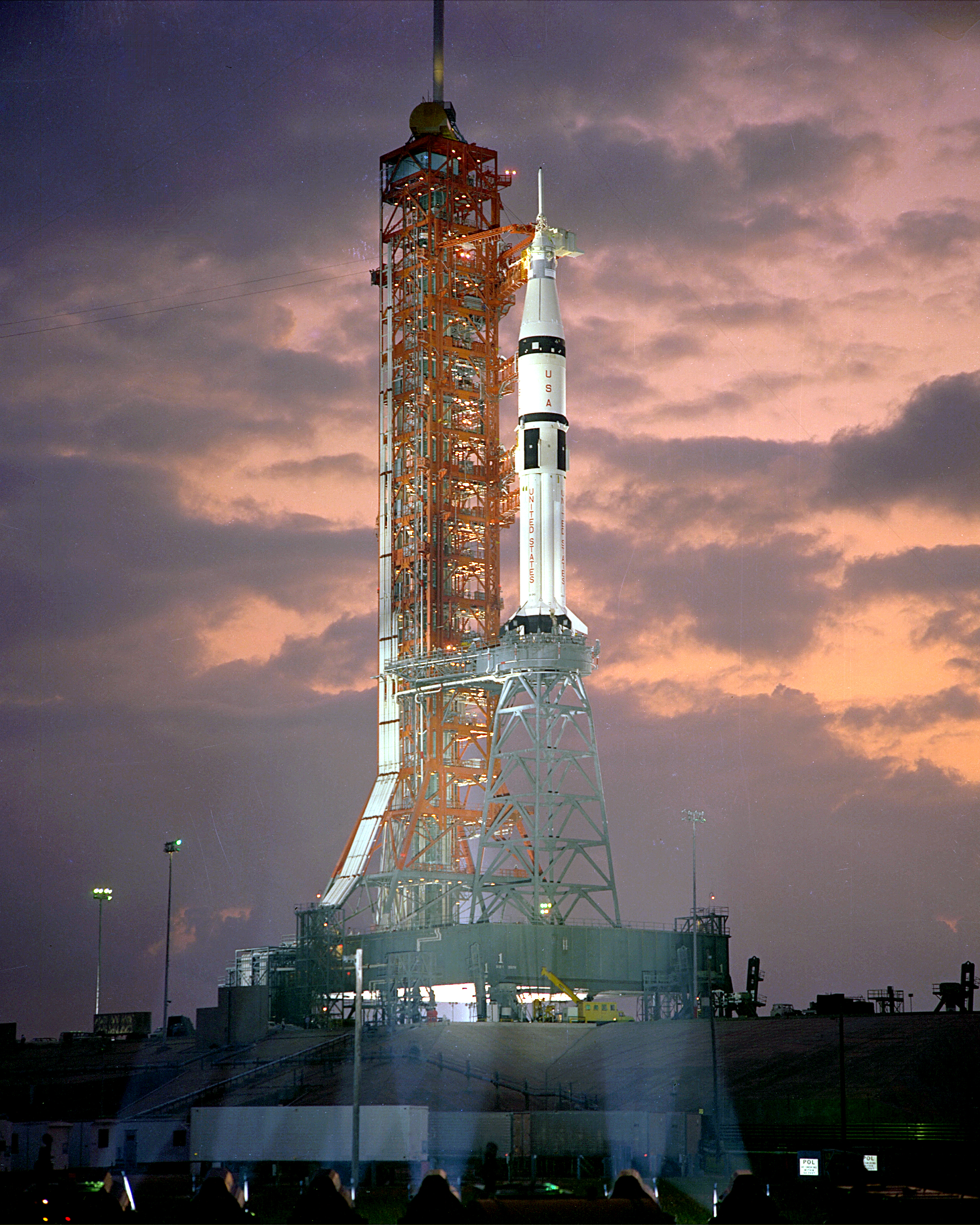
Pad 39B holding a Saturn IB on the "milkstool" launcher to be used for the Apollo-Soyuz Test Project (1975)

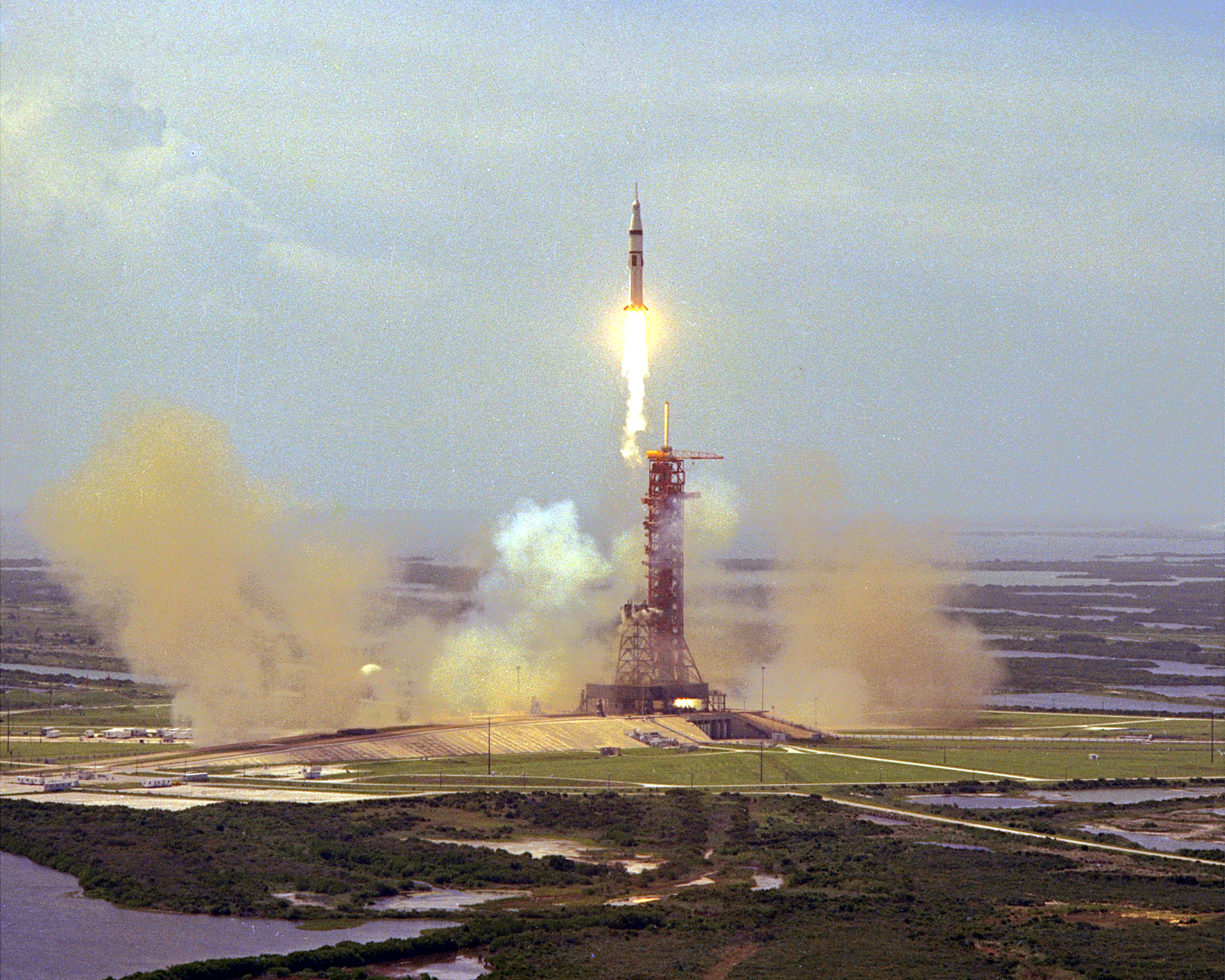
The Apollo-Soyuz Test Project launches from LC-39B (1975)

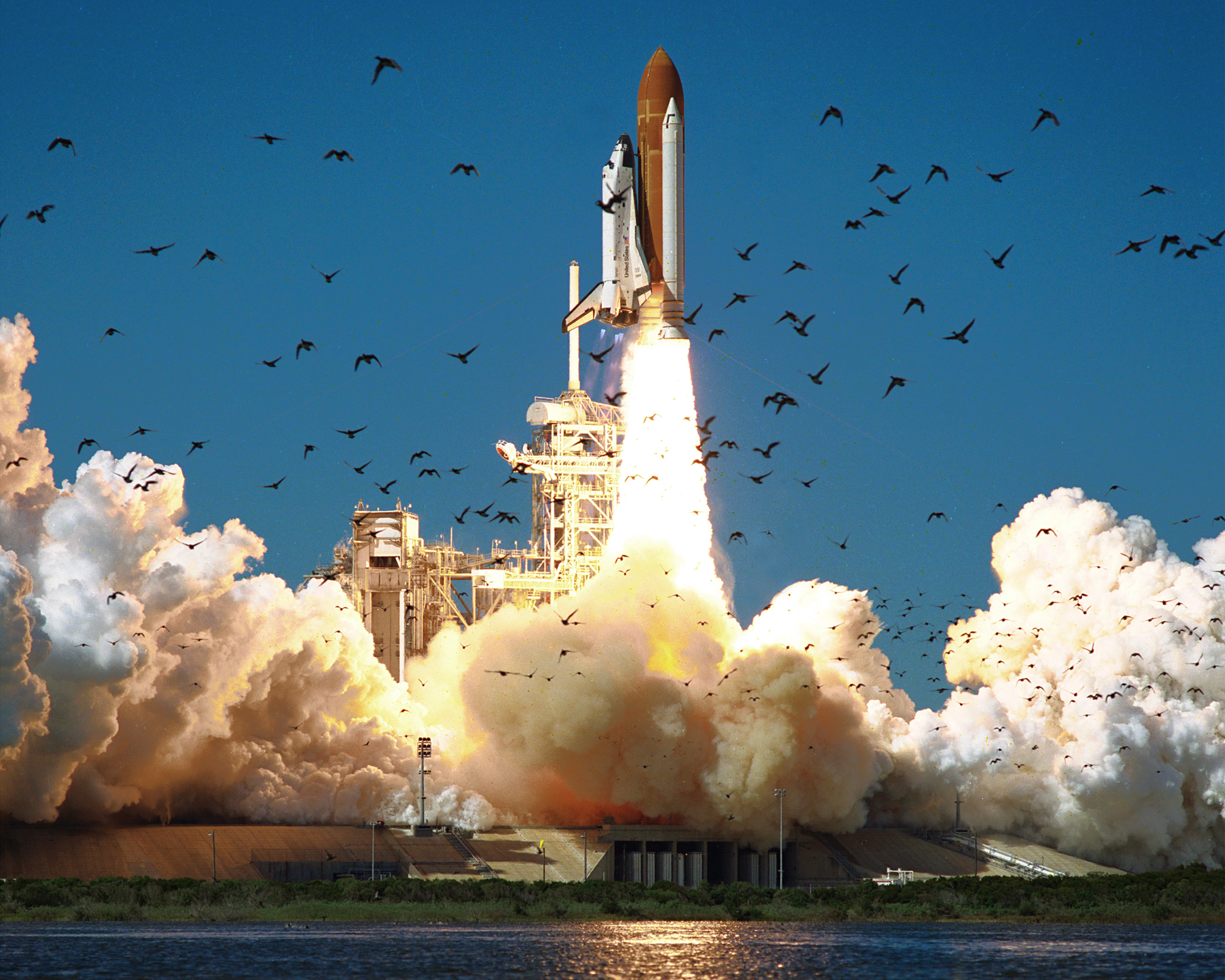
Space Shuttle Challenger launches from LC-39B on STS-51-L (1986)

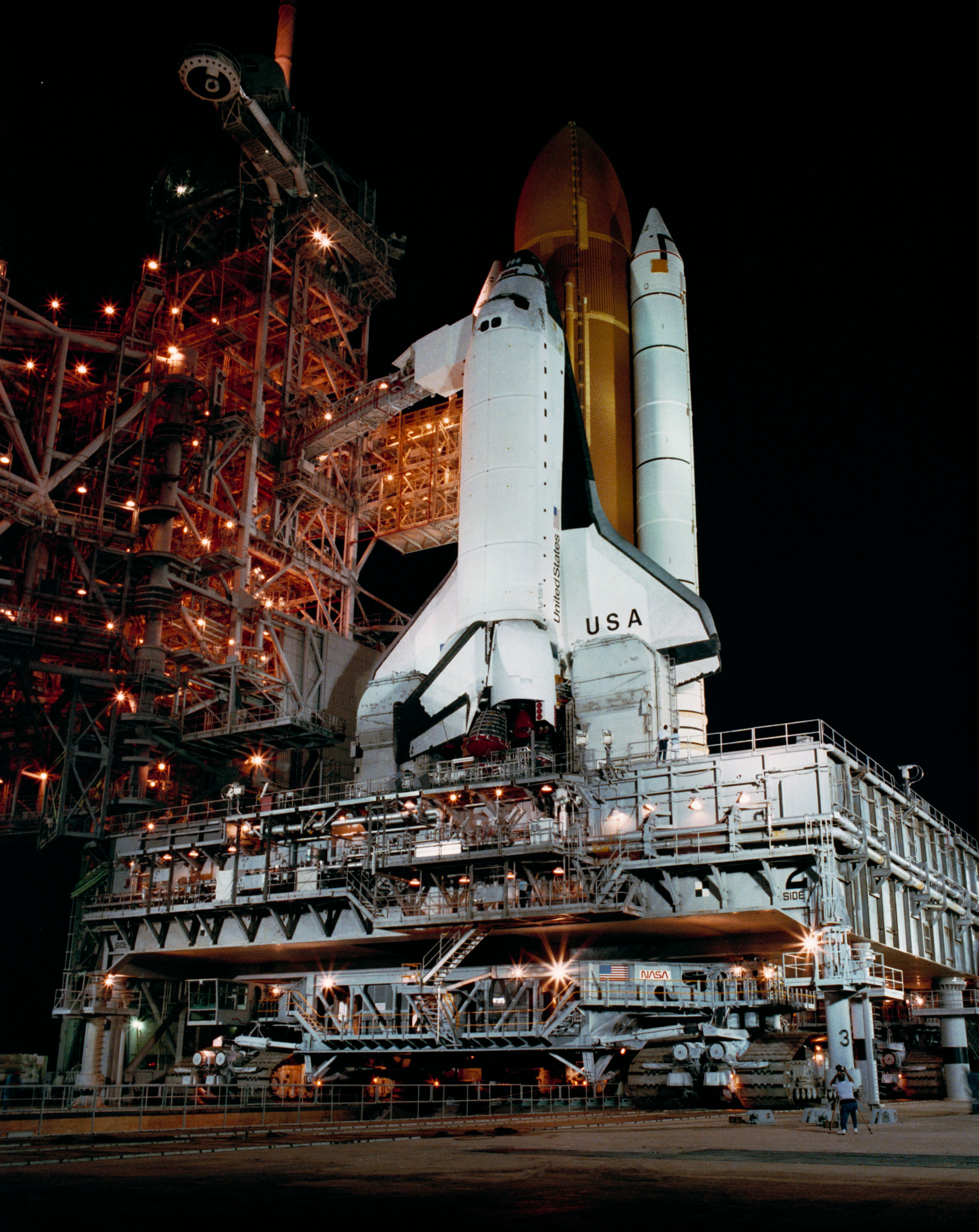
Space Shuttle Columbia on the pad of LC-39B ahead of STS-28 (1989)

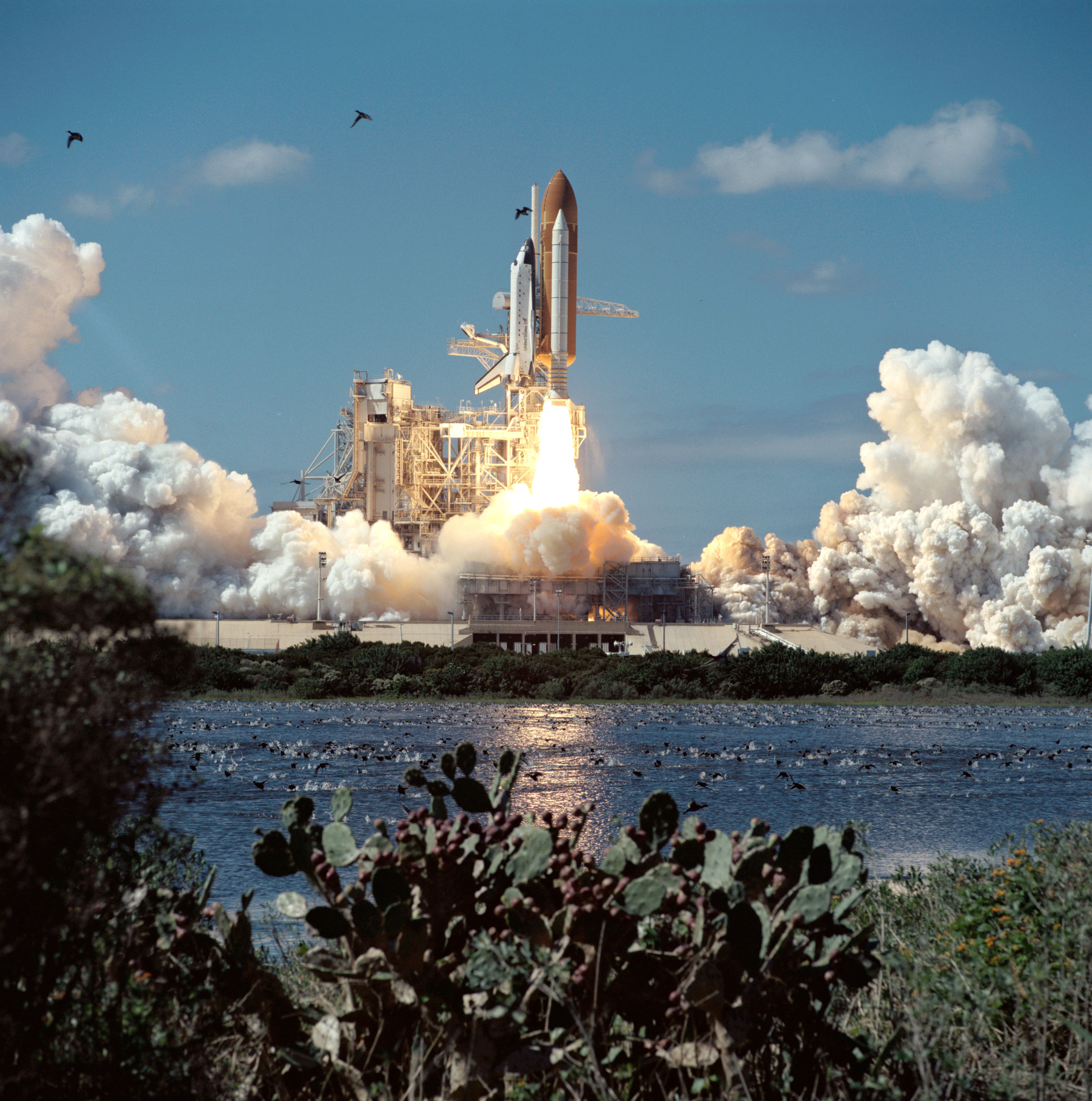
Space Shuttle Atlantis launches from LC-39B on STS-66 (1994)

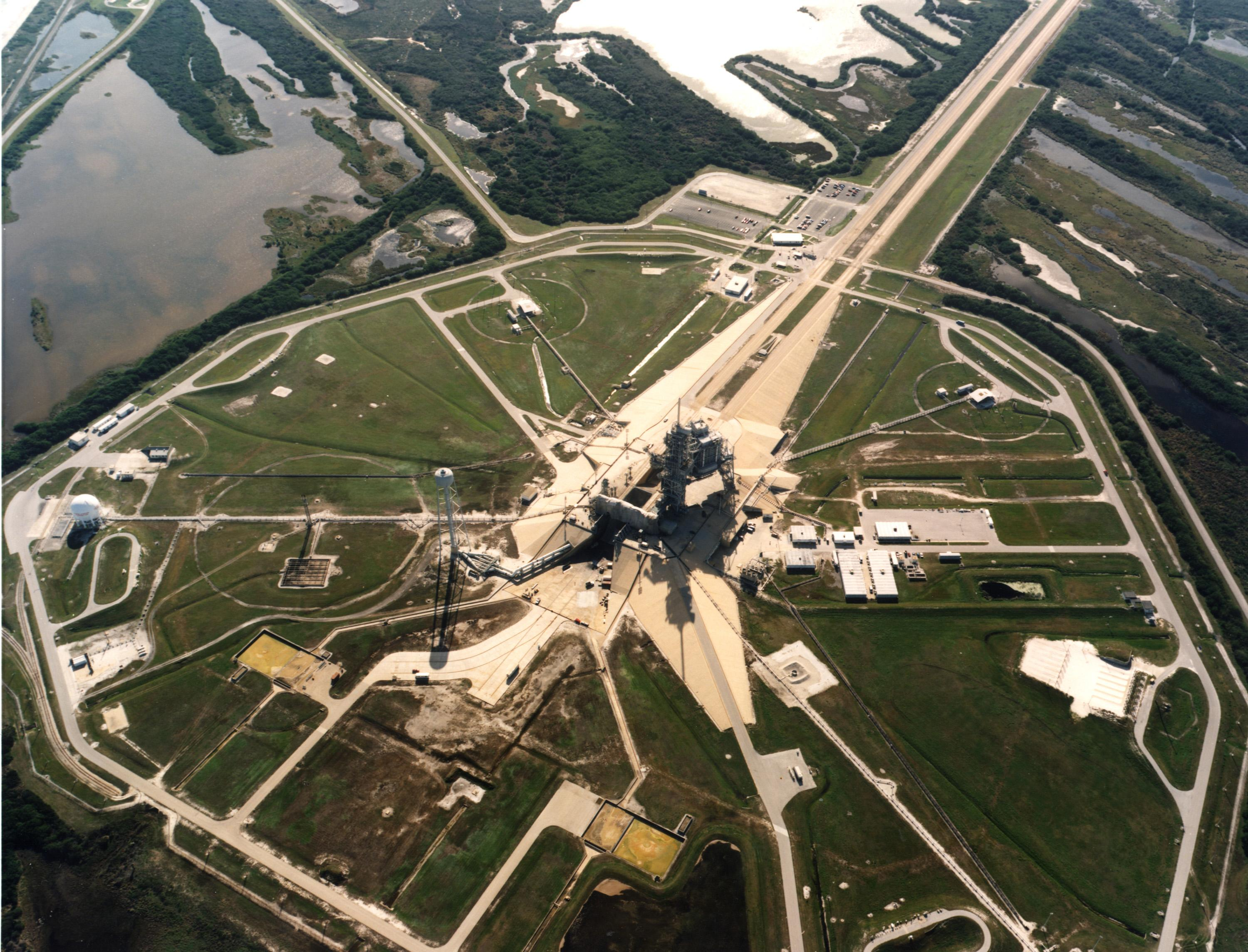
An aerial shot LC-39B during the Space Shuttle era, looking towards the south (1998)

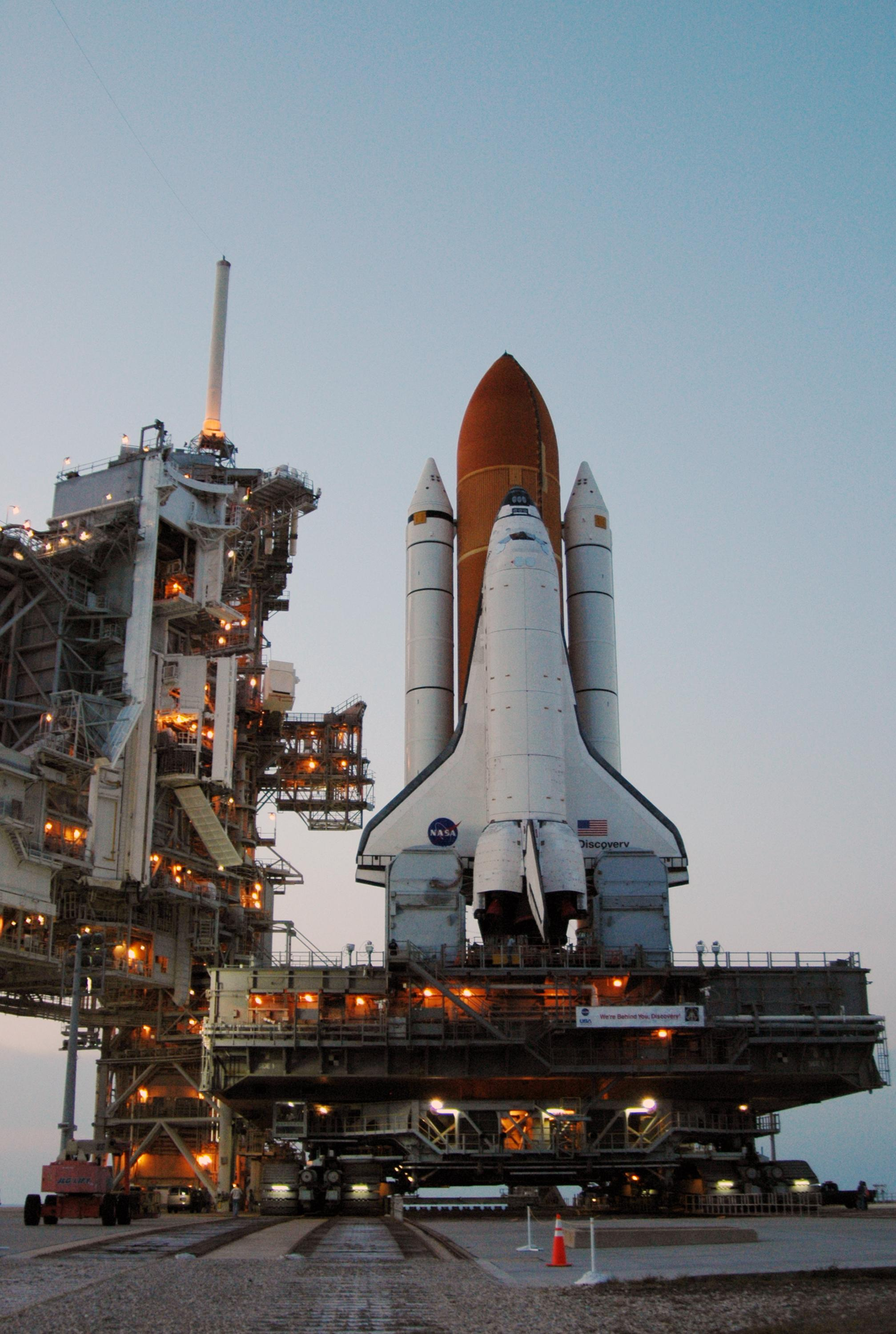
Space Shuttle Discovery on the pad of LC-39B ahead of STS-121 (2006)

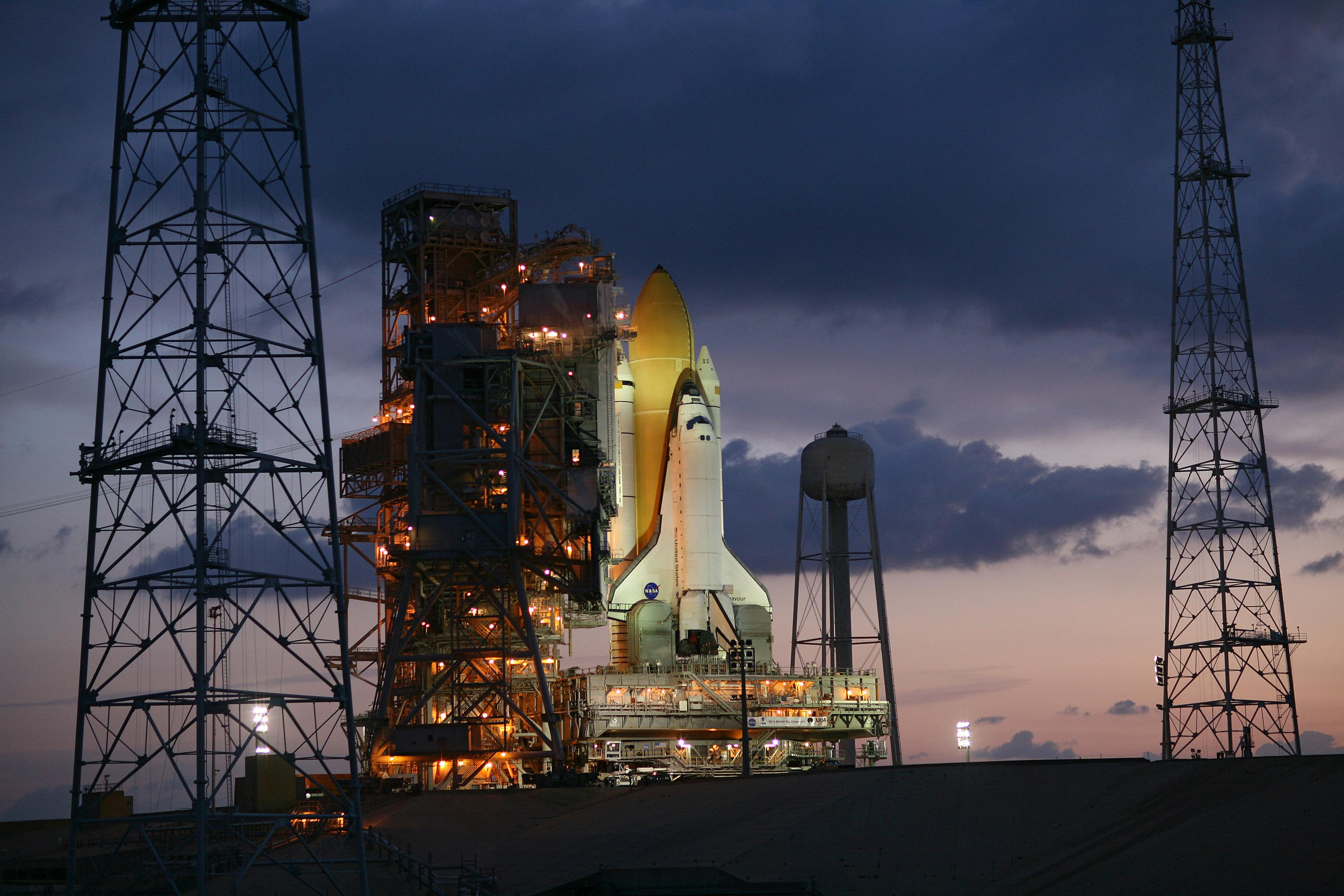
Space Shuttle Endeavour on standby on LC-39B as part of the unflown contingency rescue flight STS-400 (2009)

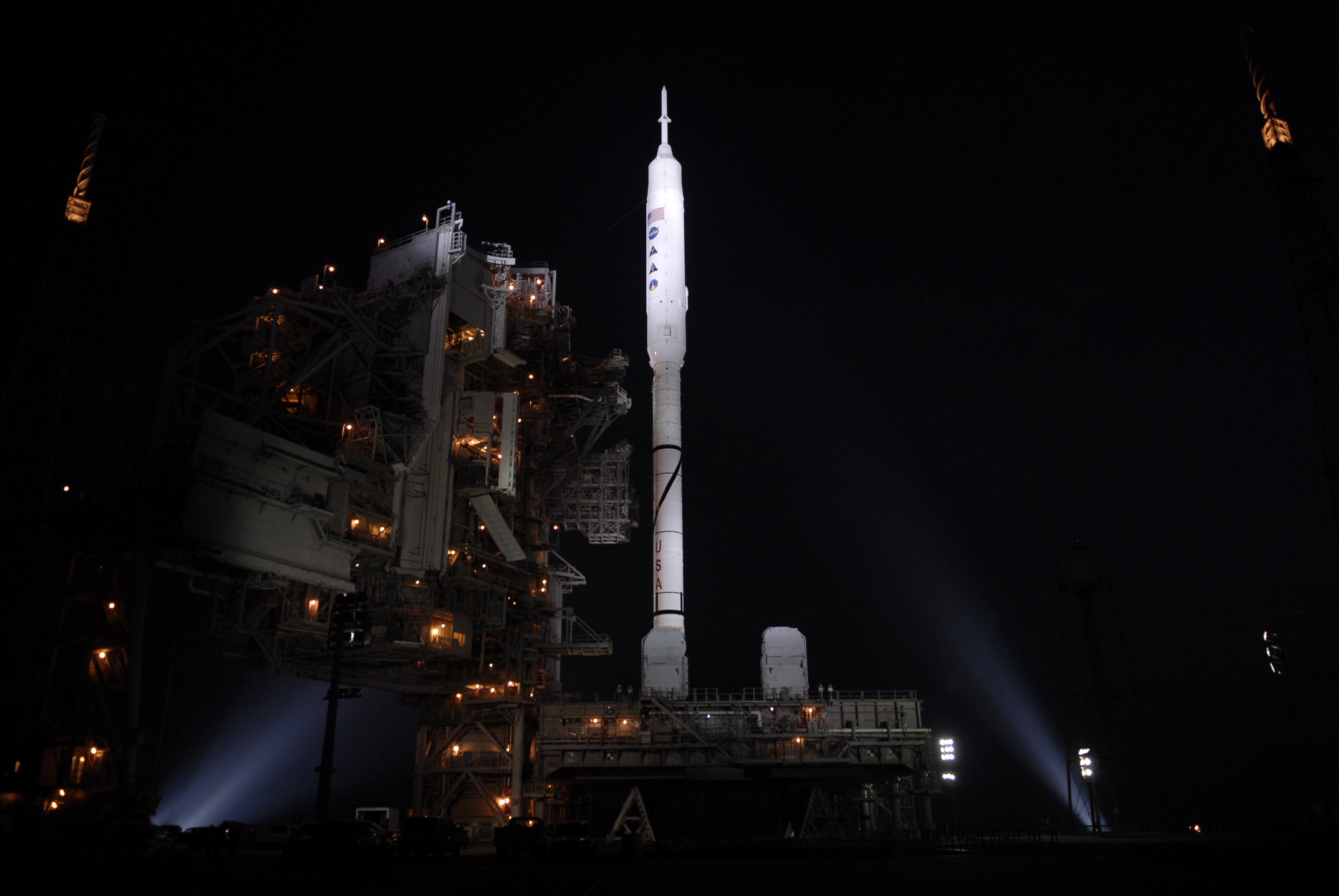
Ares I-X on the pad of LC-39B (2009)

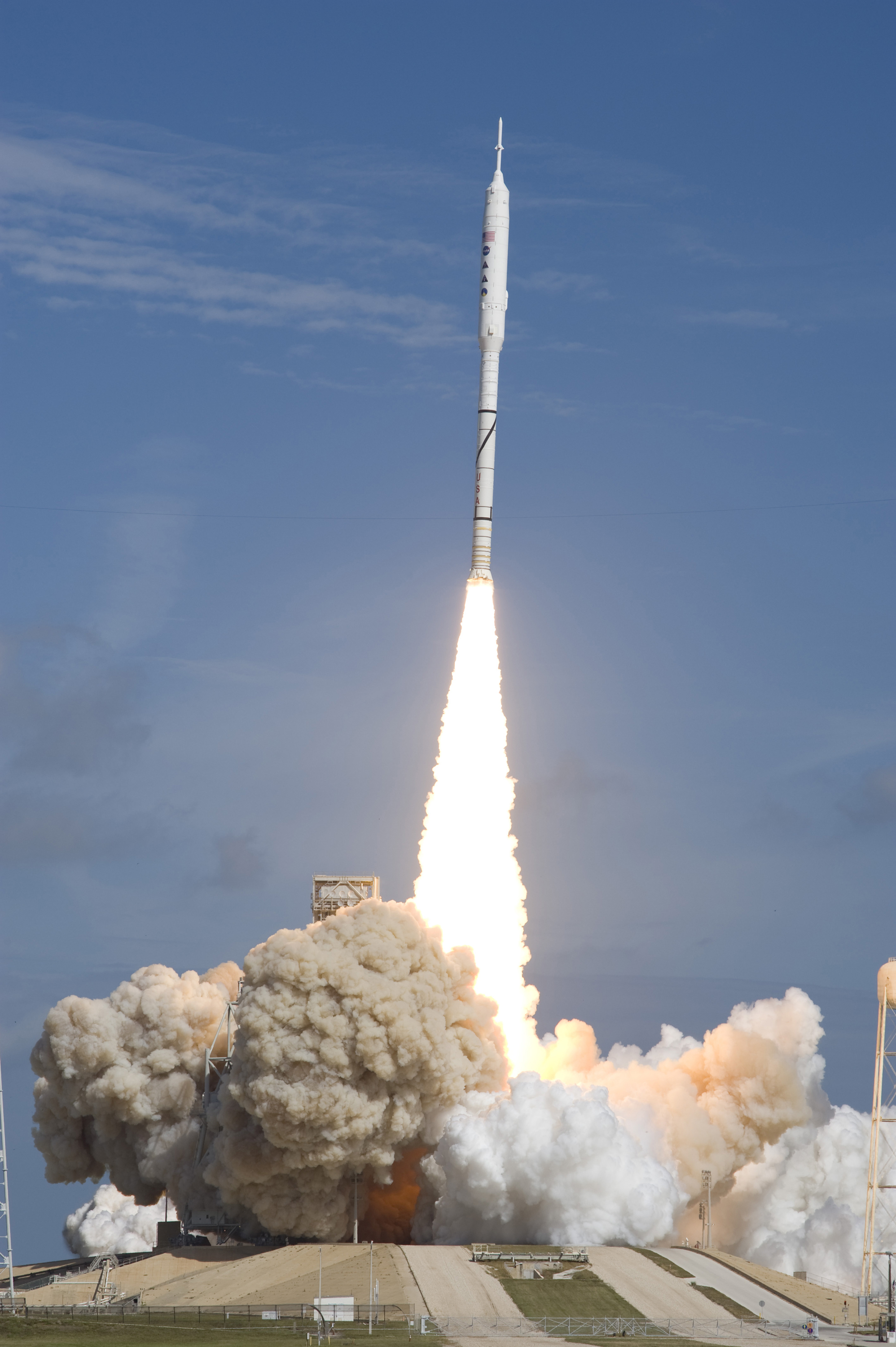
The Ares I-X launches from LC-39B (2009)

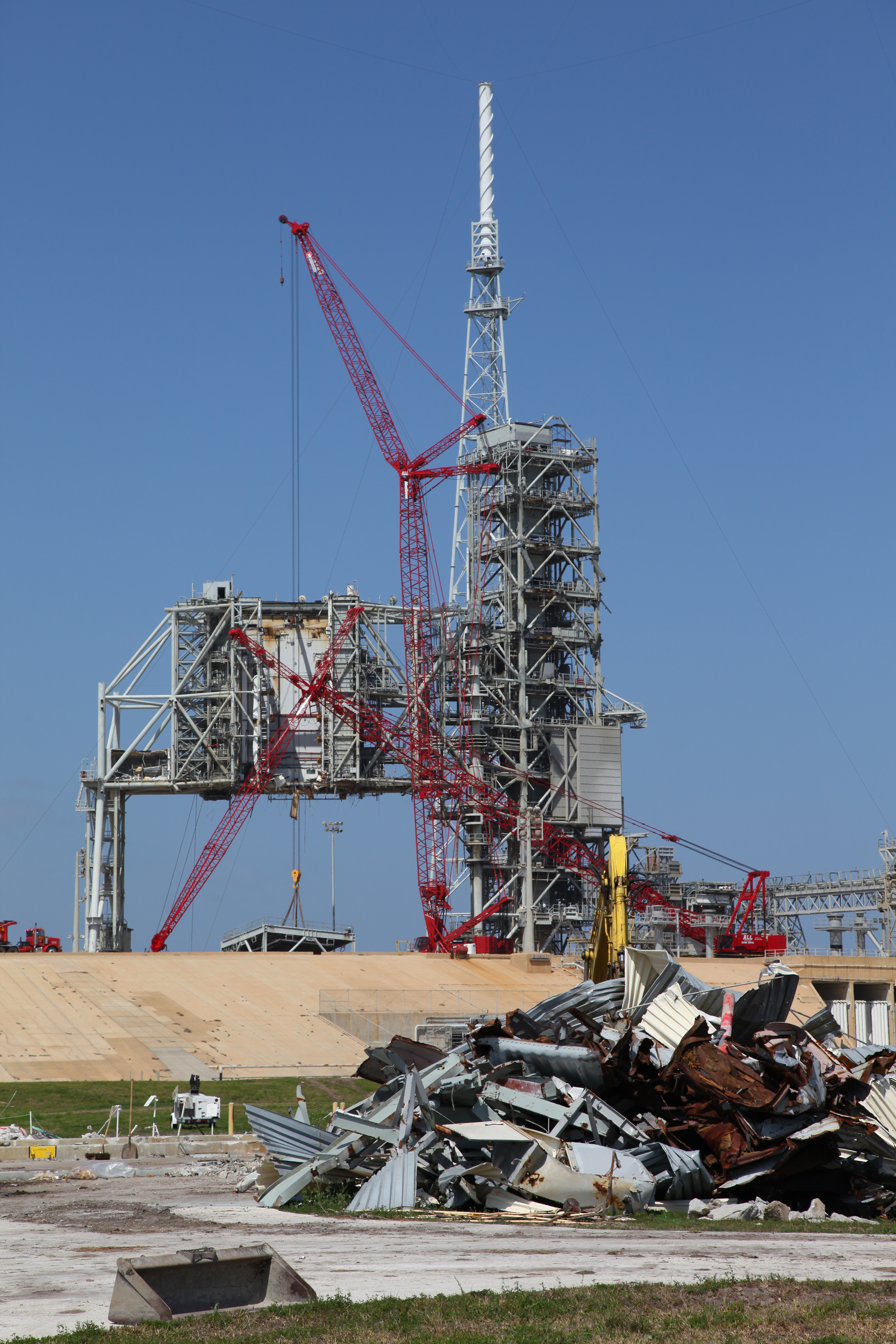
The Fixed Service Structure on LC-39B is dismantled following the end of the Space Shuttle programme (2011)

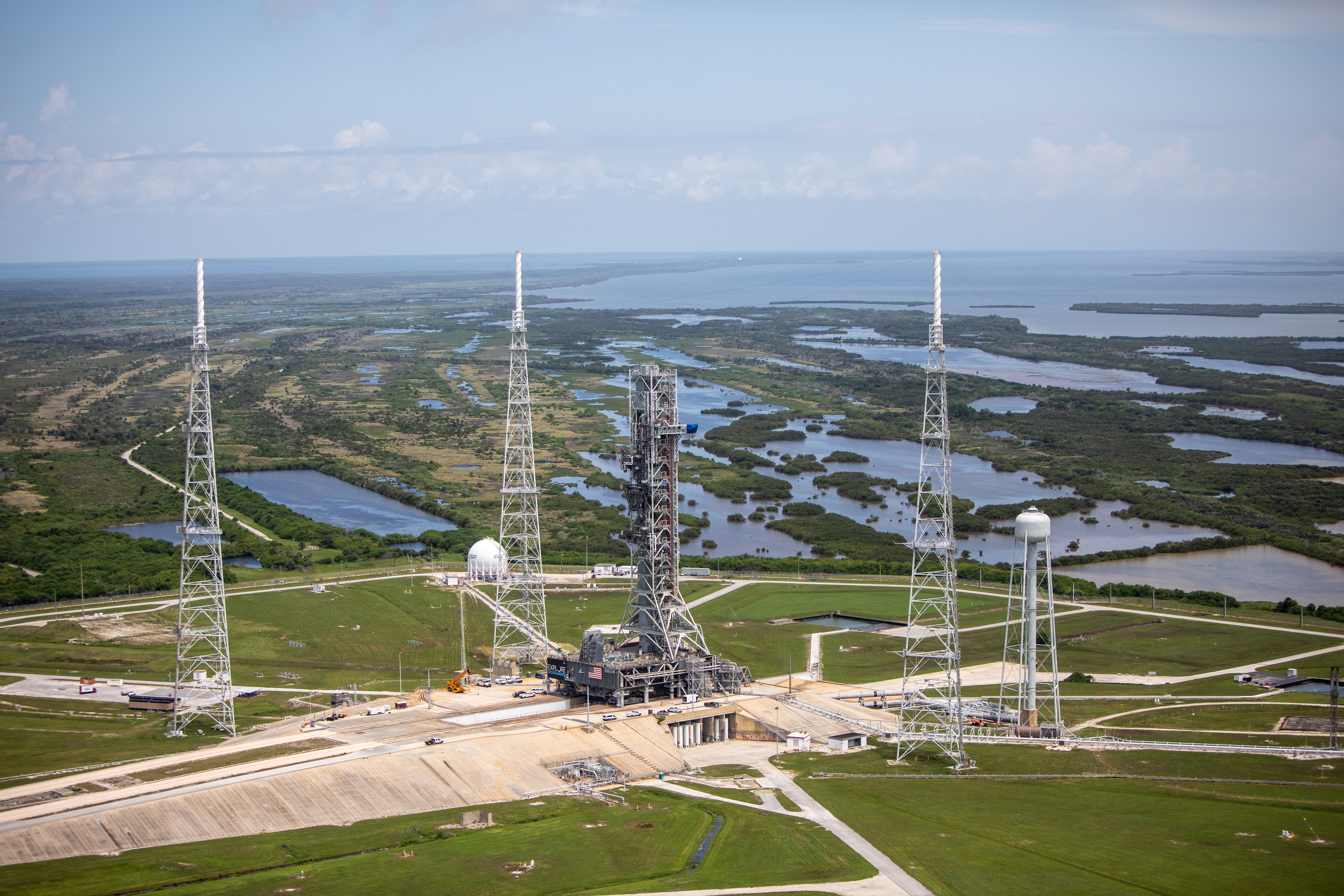
LC-39B with added lightning towers and holding the SLS Block 1 mobile launcher (2019)

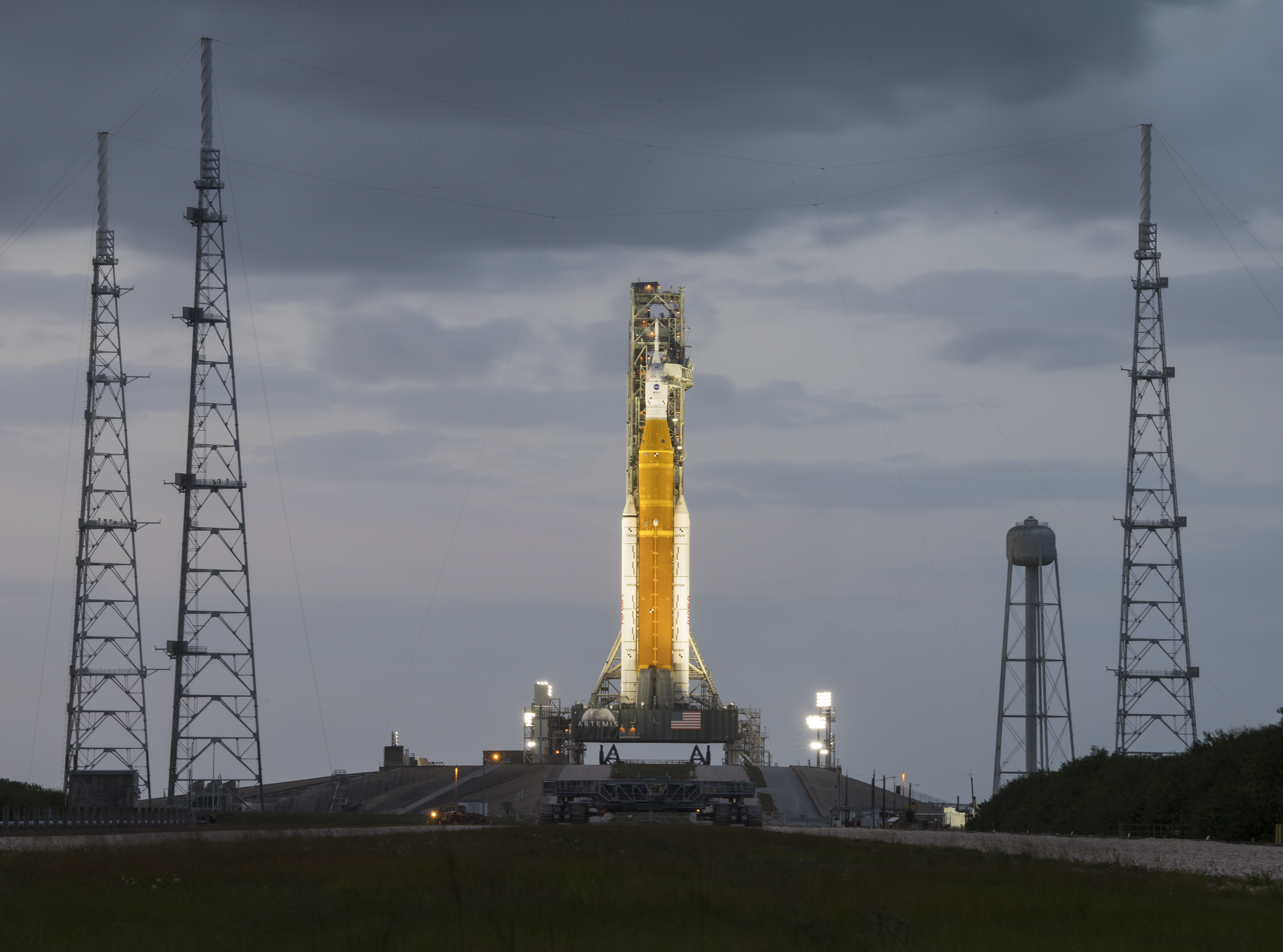
The SLS used in Artemis I on the pad of LC-39B (2022)

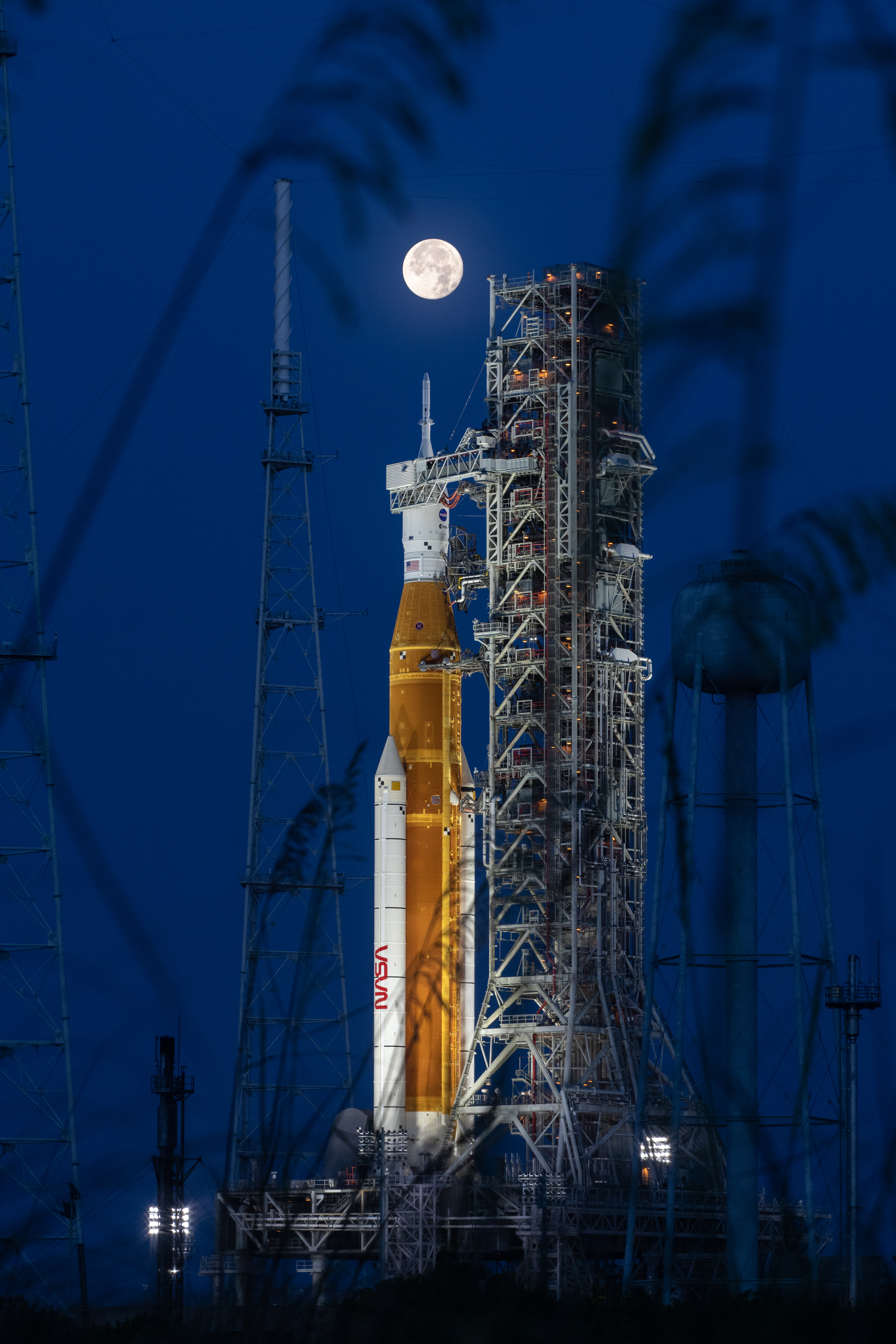
Artemis I on the pad of LC-39B (2022)

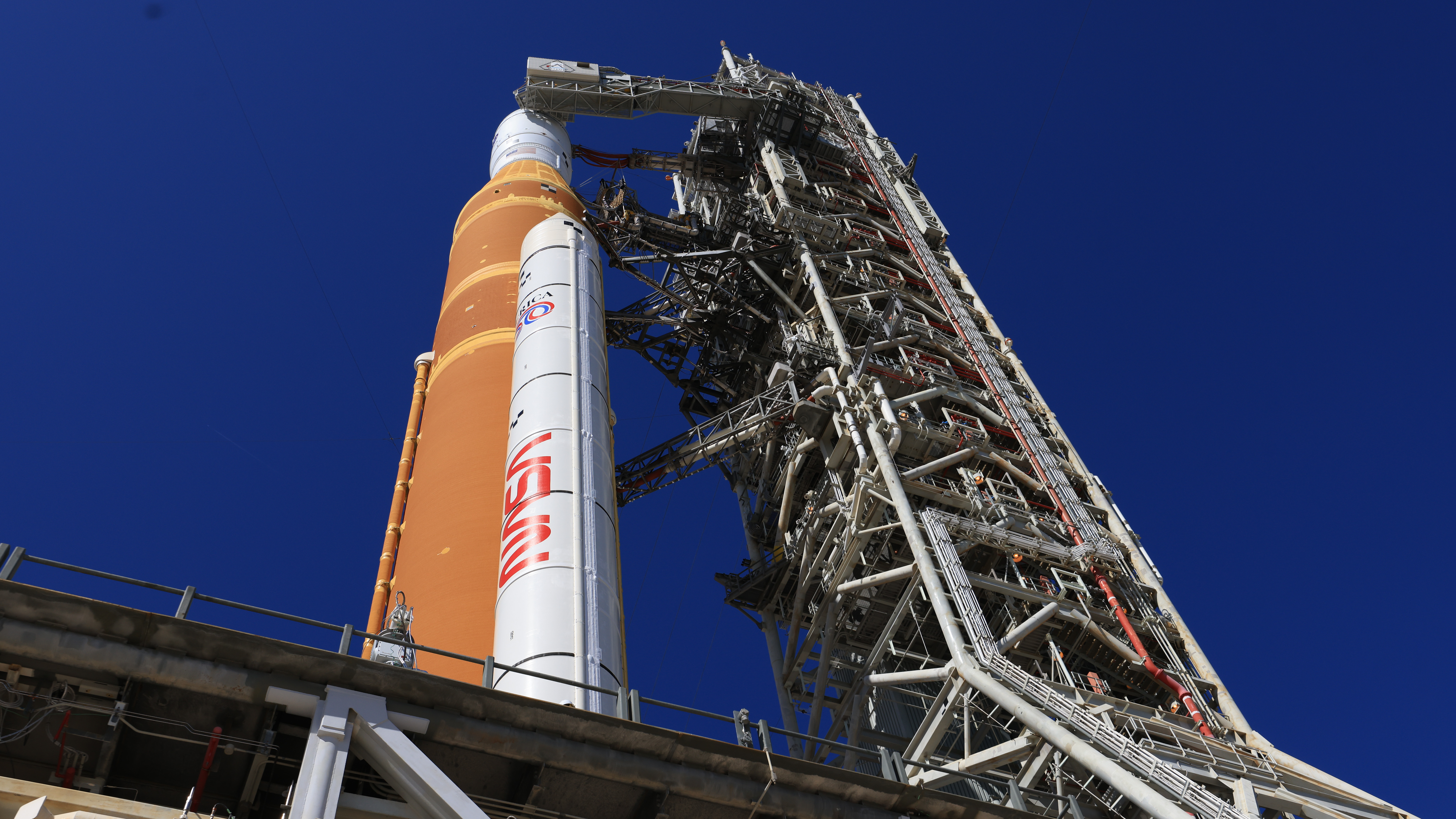
A view of the SLS used in Artemis II on the pad at LC-39B (2026)

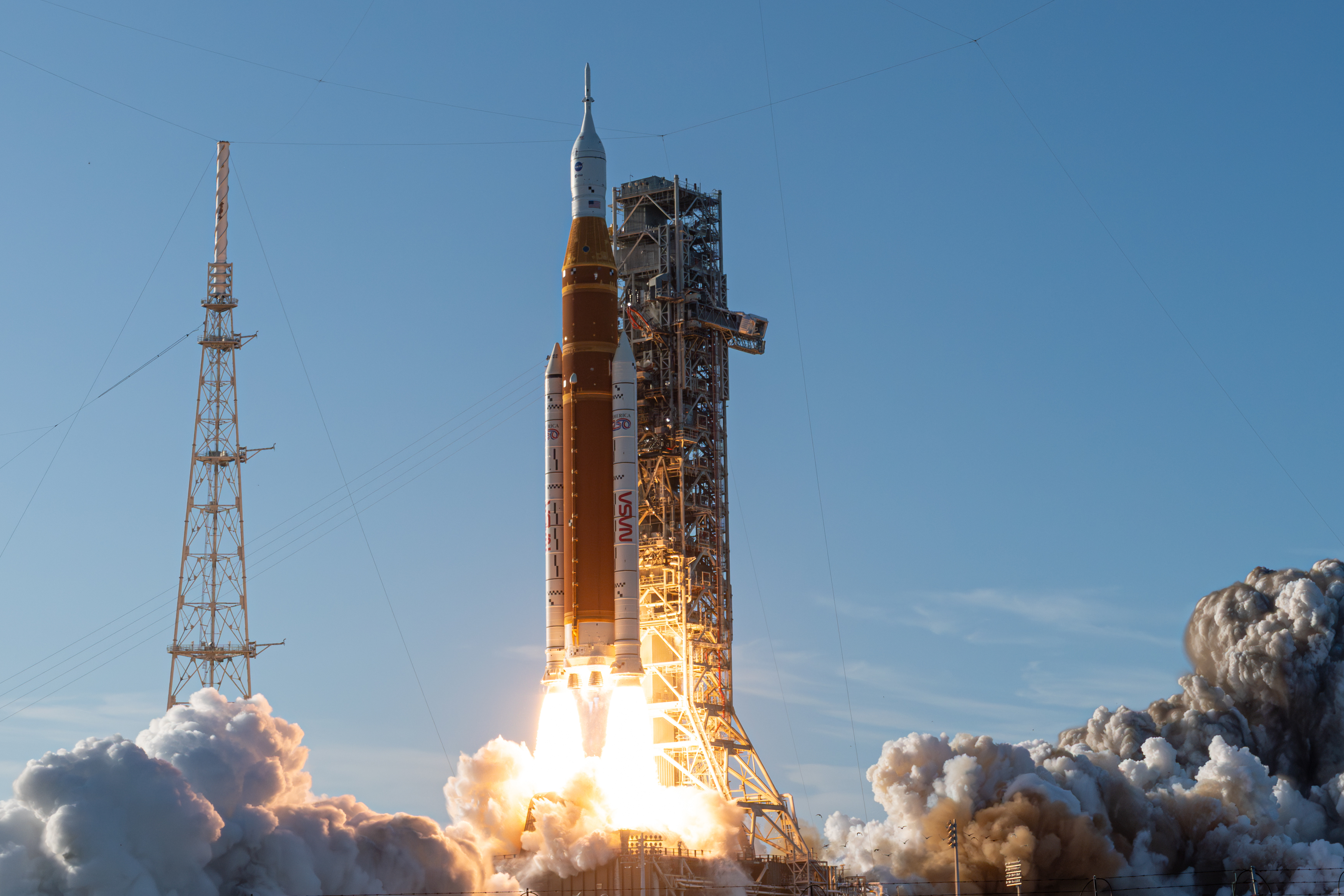
Artemis II launches from LC-39B (2026)

== See also ==
- List of Cape Canaveral and Merritt Island launch sites
