= Ares I-X =

Prototype and design concept demonstrator rocket

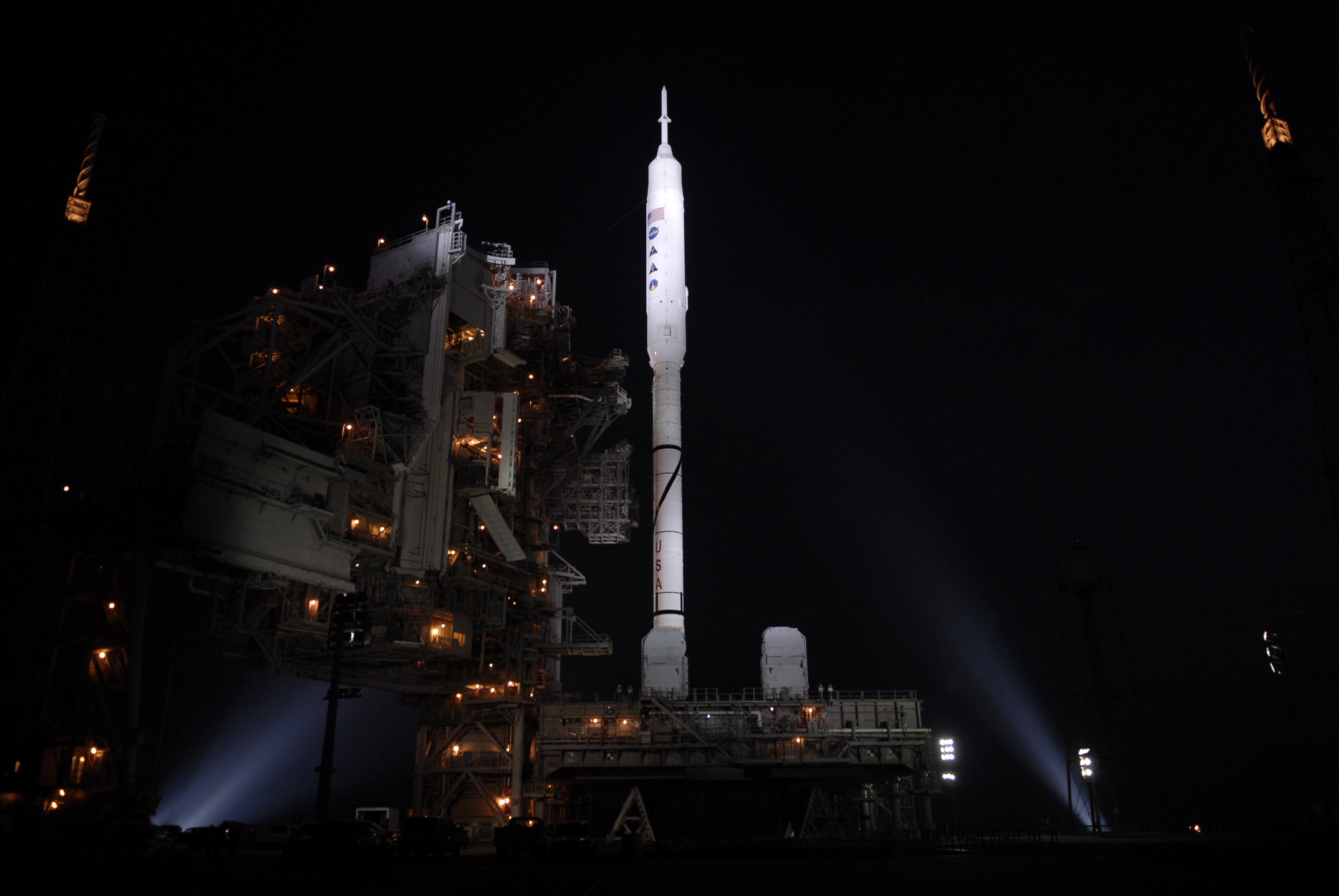
- Ares I-X before launch

Ares I-X launch
- Launch: October 28, 2009, 15:30 UTC
- Operator: NASA
- Pad: Kennedy LC-39B
- Outcome: Success
- Apogee: c. 28 miles (45 km)
- Launch duration: 6 minutes

Components
- First stage: 4-segment SRB with a fifth segment mass simulator
- Second stage: Upper stage simulator (USS)
- Ares I-X insignia

Ares I-X was the first-stage prototype and design concept demonstrator of Ares I, a launch system for human spaceflight developed by the National Aeronautics and Space Administration (NASA). Ares I-X was successfully launched on October 28, 2009. The project cost was $445 million. It was the final launch from LC-39B until Artemis I, which launched 13 years later.

The Ares I-X vehicle used in the test flight was similar in shape, mass, and size to the planned configuration of later Ares I vehicles, but had largely dissimilar internal hardware consisting of only one powered stage. Ares I vehicles were intended to launch Orion crew exploration vehicles. Along with the Ares V launch system and the Altair lunar lander, Ares I and Orion were part of NASA's Constellation program, which was developing spacecraft for U.S. human spaceflight after the Space Shuttle retirement.

== Test objectives ==
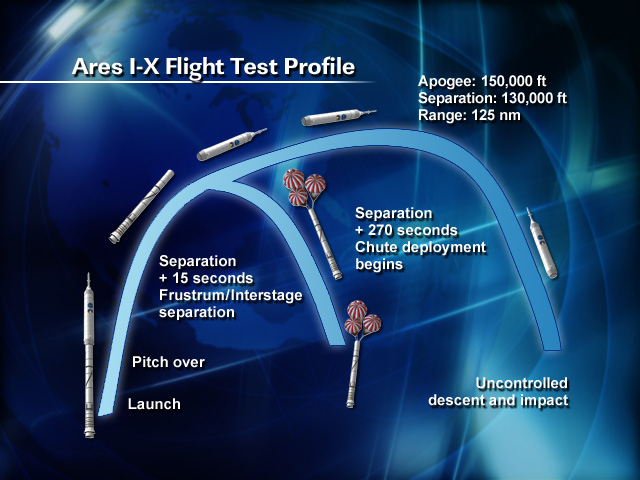
Two minutes after launch, the Ares I-X's expended Solid Rocket Booster (SRB) first stage was detached from the unpowered Upper Stage Simulator (USS); both landed in the Atlantic Ocean at different locations, as planned.

Ares I-X was the only test flight of a launch vehicle like the Ares I. The test flight objectives included:

- Demonstrating control of a dynamically similar vehicle using control algorithms similar to those used for Ares I.
- Performing an in-flight separation/staging event between an Ares I-similar First Stage and a representative Upper Stage.
- Demonstrating assembly and recovery of an Ares I-like First Stage at Kennedy Space Center (KSC).
- Demonstrating First Stage separation sequencing, and measuring First Stage atmospheric entry dynamics, and parachute performance.
- Characterizing the magnitude of integrated vehicle roll torque throughout First Stage flight.

The flight also had several secondary objectives, including:

- Quantifying the effectiveness of the first-stage booster deceleration motors.
- Characterizing induced environments and loads on the vehicle during ascent.
- Demonstrating a procedure for determining the vehicle's position to orient the flight control system.
- Characterize induced loads on the Flight Test Vehicle while on the launch pad.
- Assess potential Ares I access locations in the VAB and on the Pad.
- Assess First Stage electrical umbilical performance.

The Ares I-X flight profile closely approximated the flight conditions that the Ares I would expect to experience through Mach 4.5, at an altitude of about 130,000 feet (40,000 m) and through a maximum dynamic pressure ("Max Q") of approximately 800 pounds per square foot (38 kPa).

The Ares I-X flight profile resembled the uncrewed Saturn I flights of the 1960s, which tested the Saturn propulsion concept.

By flying the vehicle through first-stage separation, the test flight also verified the performance and dynamics of the Ares I solid rocket booster in a "single stick" arrangement, which is different from the solid rocket booster's then-current "double-booster" configuration alongside the external tank on the space shuttle.

== Description ==
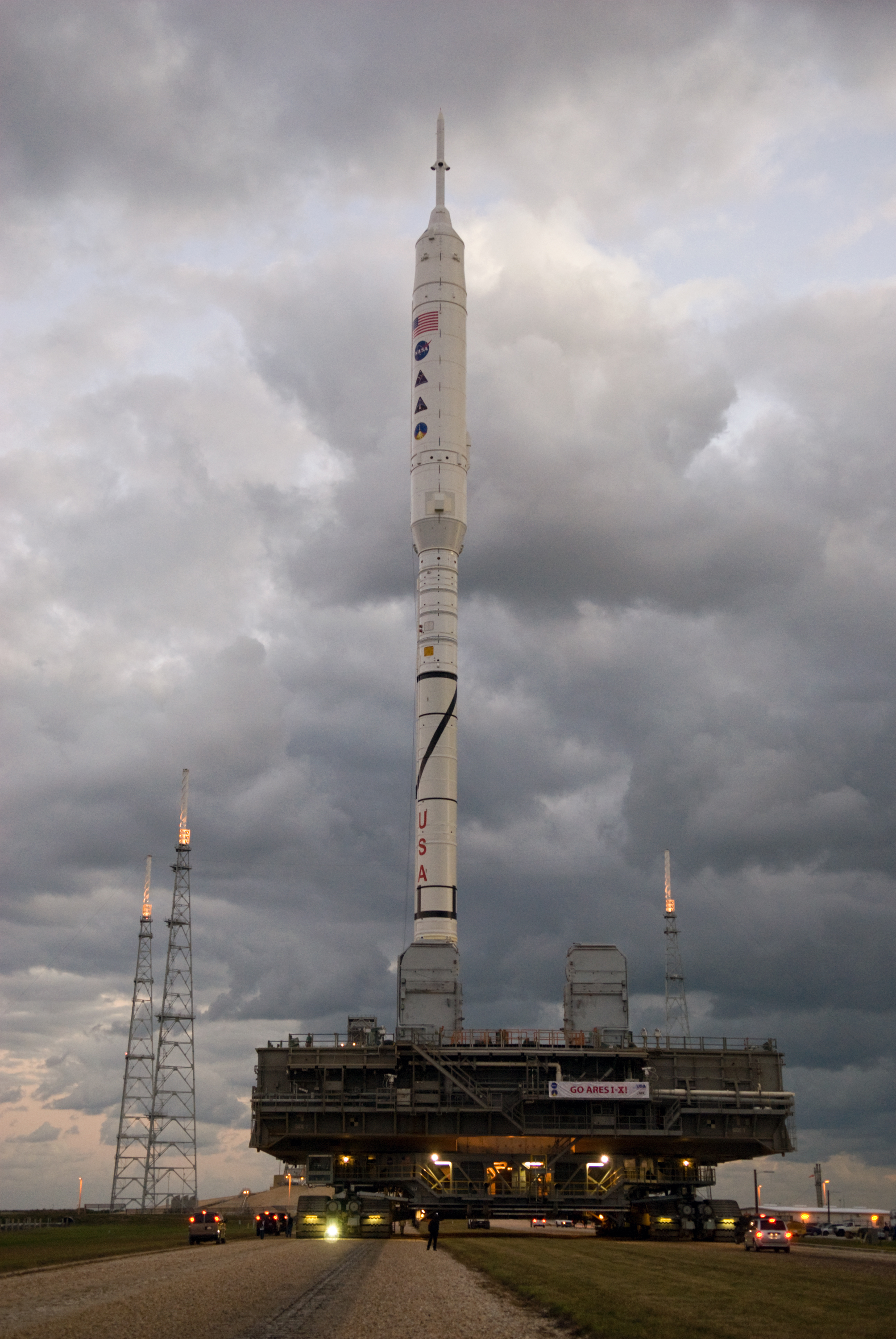
Rollout of Ares I-X at Kennedy Space Center Launch Complex 39 secured by four bolts on a mobile launcher platform.

The Ares I-X vehicle consisted of a functional four-segment solid rocket booster (SRB) stage, a fifth segment mass simulator, an upper-stage simulator (USS), which was similar in shape and heavier than the actual upper stage, as well as a simulated Orion crew module (CM) and launch abort system (LAS). Since the actual upper-stage hardware could not be produced in time for the flight test, the upper-stage mass simulator allowed the booster to fly approximately the same trajectory through the first stage of flight. The USS and the CM/LAS mass simulators launched by the Ares I-X were not recovered and fell into the Atlantic Ocean. The first stage, including the fifth segment mass simulator, was recovered to retrieve flight data recorders and reusable equipment.

=== First stage ===
The four-segment solid rocket motor and aft skirt for Ares I-X was drawn directly from the Space Shuttle inventory. The motor was manufactured by ATK Launch Services of Promontory, Utah. The new forward structures were manufactured by Major Tool & Machine of Indianapolis, Indiana. The first-stage element was managed by Marshall Space Flight Center in Huntsville, Alabama. Modifications to the solid rocket booster include:

- The aft skirt was modified to include eight booster deceleration motors, which pulled the booster directly away from the upper-stage simulator, as well as four booster tumble motors, which caused the booster to tumble horizontally to decrease its velocity prior to reentry. The aft skirt also housed one of two Redundant Rate Gyro Units (RRGUs), which provided data to inform the Fault Tolerant Inertial Navigation Unit (FTINU) of the vehicle's attitude and position. Steel ballast of 3,500 pounds (1,600 kg) was also added to the aft skirt to move the first stage's center of gravity aft to ensure that the first stage would tumble properly after separation.
- An extended service tunnel along the exterior, which accommodated:
  - An extended linear shaped charge for the flight termination system, to cover all four segments in the event the stage needed to be self-destructed.
  - Cabling for additional pressure and environmental instrumentation.
- A fifth segment simulator, which allowed the Ares I-X to simulate the length and mass of the Ares I five-segment motor and housed the First Stage Avionics Module (FSAM). The FSAM contained the electronics boxes that:
  - Captured and stored flight data for recovery after splashdown.
  - Provided electrical power for the avionics systems.
  - Performed separation and parachute deployment commands.
  - Contained video cameras that record the first-stage separation.
- A hollow forward skirt which simulated the Ares I First Stage forward skirt.
- A forward skirt extension, which housed new, larger parachutes. The three main parachutes each had a 150-foot (46 m) diameter, compared to the Shuttle booster main parachutes, which are 136 feet (41 m) across. It also had a Shuttle booster heritage nosecap that covers the pilot and drogue parachutes. Jettisoning the nosecap released the pilot parachute which pulled out the drogue. The forward skirt extension separated from the booster deploying the main parachutes.
- A frustum, which was a hollow, inverted half-cone that connected the 12-foot (3.7 m)-diameter first stage to the 18-foot (5.5 m)-diameter upper-stage simulator.

For the Ares I-X flight test, the frustum and forward skirt extension were made of aluminum. The forward skirt and fifth segment simulator were made of steel.

=== Upper-stage simulator ===
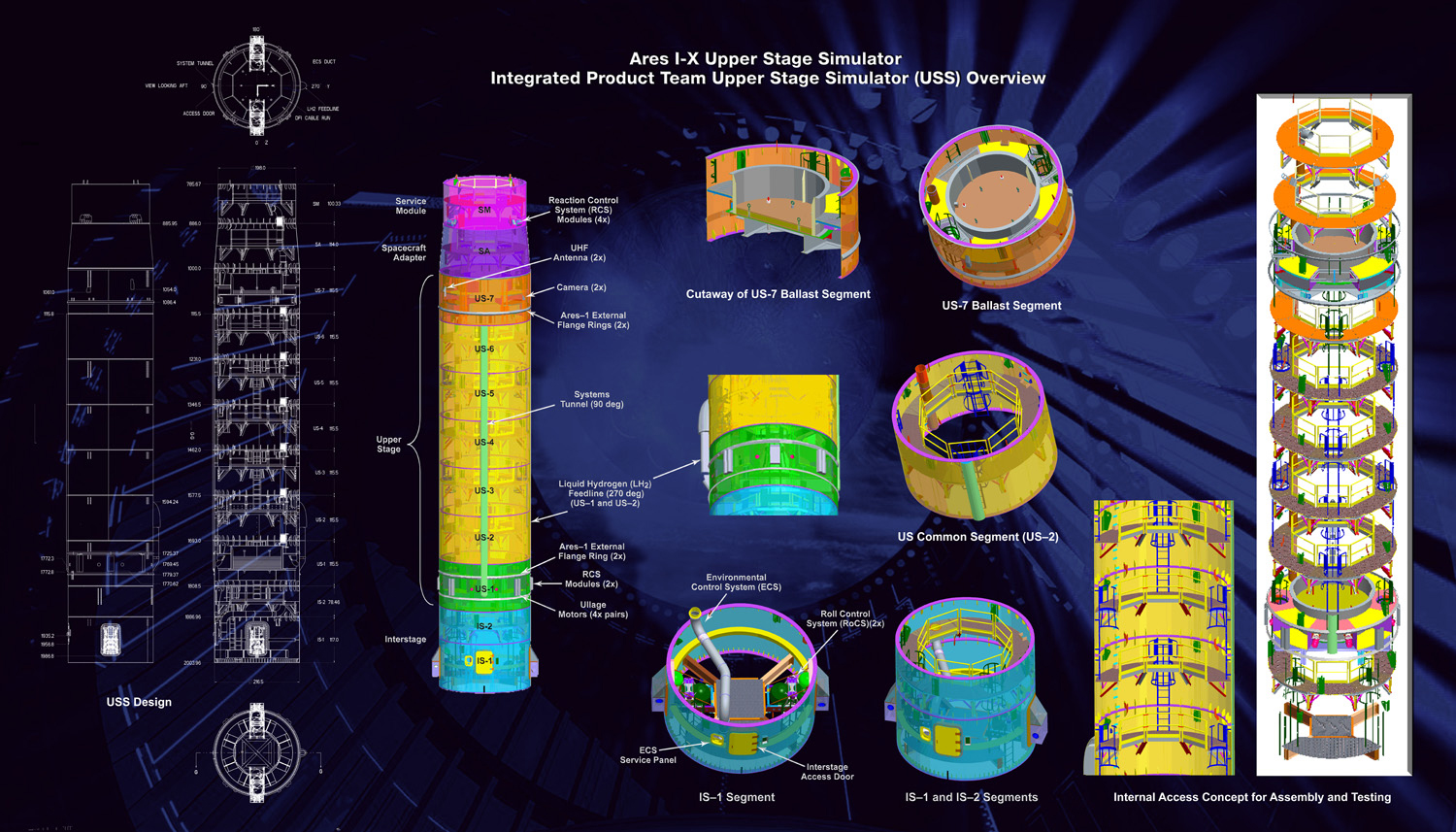
The upper stage simulator

The upper-stage simulator (USS) was manufactured by NASA personnel at Glenn Research Center in Cleveland. Because of transportation limitations (bridge heights on highways and rivers), the simulator was built out of eleven steel segments 9.5 feet (2.9 m) tall by 18 feet (5.5 m) wide. The USS simulated the shape, mass, and center of gravity characteristics of Ares I from the interstage to the top of the service module of the Orion Crew exploration vehicle. The centers of mass for the liquid hydrogen and liquid oxygen tanks were simulated through the use of steel ballast plates.

The USS included a variety of temperature, vibration, thermal, and acoustic sensors to collect the primary data needed to meet the mission objectives. It also housed the Fault Tolerant Inertial Navigation Unit (FTINU), which controlled the vehicle's flight and primary avionics functions. For stability, the FTINU was mounted on the underside of the lower ballast plates. Ground operations personnel accessed the FTINU through a crew hatch on the side of the interstage segment, which also housed the roll control system. Each USS segment included a ladder and ring-shaped platform to allow access to the sensors and cabling for the developmental flight instrumentation. The stairs and platforms were necessary because Launch Complex 39B is not tall enough to provide crew access to the upper parts of Ares I-X.

=== Roll control system ===
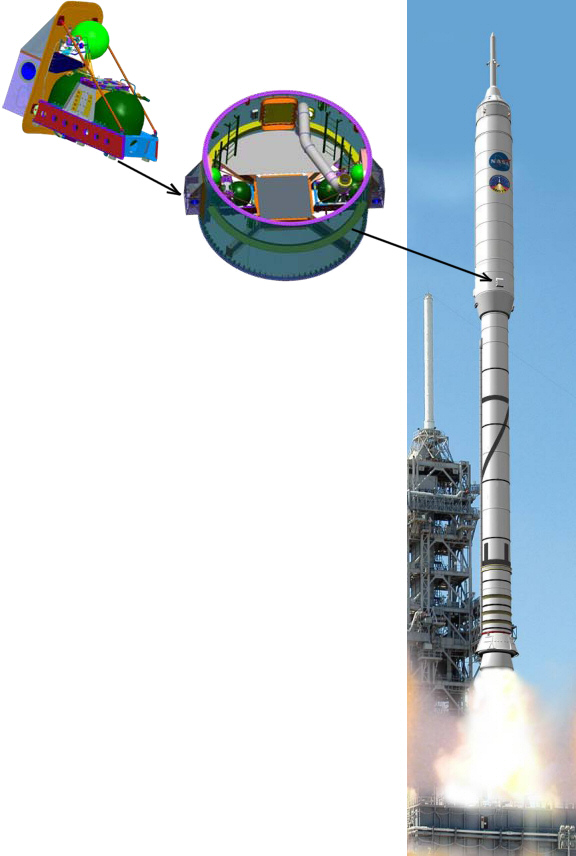
The roll control system (artist's impression of launch)

The active roll control system (RoCS) was needed because the flight test vehicle had a tendency to roll around its axis of forward motion. The RoCS for Ares I-X consisted of two modules containing engines originally used on now-decommissioned Peacekeeper missiles. The RoCS performed two primary functions:

- Rolling the vehicle 90 degrees after liftoff to emulate the Ares I roll attitude at launch.
- Maintaining a constant roll attitude during ascent up to stage separation.

The RoCS modules, placed on opposite sides of the outer skin of the Upper Stage Simulator, used hypergolic monomethyl hydrazine (MMH) and nitrogen tetroxide (NTO) for propellants and each included two nozzles, which fired tangential to the skin and at right angles to the roll axis in order to provide a controlling roll torque. The propellants were loaded into the modules at Kennedy Space Center's Hypergol Maintenance Facility (HMF) and transported on the ground for installation into the USS in the Vehicle Assembly Building (VAB) prior to rollout to Launch Complex 39B.

The RoCS modules were designed and constructed to fit into the Interstage segment of the USS by Teledyne Brown Engineering in Huntsville, Alabama. The engines were hot-fire tested at White Sands Test Facility in 2007 and 2008 to verify that they could perform the pulsing duty cycle required by Ares I-X.

=== Crew Module / Launch Abort System Simulator (CM/LAS Simulator) ===
At the top of the Ares I-X flight test vehicle was a combined Orion crew module and launch abort system simulator, resembling the structural and aerodynamic characteristics of Ares I. The full-scale crew module (CM) is approximately 16 feet (4.9 m) in diameter and 7 feet (2.1 m) tall, while the launch abort system (LAS) is 46 feet (14 m) long.

The CM/LAS simulator was built with high fidelity to ensure that its hardware components accurately reflect the shape and physical properties of the models used in computer analyses and wind tunnel tests. This precision enables NASA to compare CM/LAS flight performance with preflight predictions with high confidence.

Ares I-X flight data were collected with sensors throughout the vehicle, including approximately 150 sensors in the CM/LAS simulator that recorded thermal, aerodynamic, acoustic, vibration and other data. Data were transmitted to the ground via telemetry and also stored in the First Stage Avionics Module (FSAM), located in the empty fifth segment.

Aerodynamic data collected from sensors in the CM/LAS contribute to measurements of vehicle acceleration and angle of attack. How the tip of the rocket slices through the atmosphere is important because that determines the flow of air over the entire vehicle.

The CM/LAS splashed down in the ocean along with the upper-stage simulator (USS) after the boost phase of the mission.

This simulator was designed and built by a government-industry team at Langley Research Center in Virginia. It was flown to Kennedy Space Center by C-5 transport and was the last piece of hardware stacked onto the rocket in the Vehicle Assembly Building.

=== Avionics ===
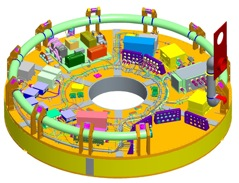
Avionics

Ares I-X used avionics hardware from the Atlas V Evolved Expendable Launch Vehicle (EELV) to control its flight. This hardware included the Fault Tolerant Inertial Navigation Unit (FTINU) and Redundant Rate Gyro Units (RRGUs), and cable harnesses. The first stage was controlled primarily by heritage hardware from existing Space Shuttle systems. A new electronics box, the Ascent Thrust Vector Controller (ATVC), acted as a translation tool to communicate commands from the Atlas-based flight computer to the solid rocket booster's thrust vector control system. The ATVC was the only new avionics box for the flight. All other components were existing or off-the-shelf units. Ares I-X also employed 720 thermal, acceleration, acoustic, and vibration sensors as part of its developmental flight instrumentation (DFI) to collect the data necessary for the mission. Some of this data was transmitted real-time via telemetry while the rest was stored in electronics boxes located in the First Stage Avionics Module (FSAM), located inside the hollow first-stage fifth segment.

The ground-based portion of the mission's avionics included a ground control, command, and communications (GC3) unit, which was installed on Mobile Launcher Platform-1 (MLP-1) for launch at Launch Complex 39B at Kennedy Space Center. The GC3 unit enabled the flight control system to interface with computers on the ground. The flight test vehicle flew autonomously and was controlled by the FTINU, located on the underside of the lower ballast plates of the upper-stage simulator (USS).

The avionics were developed by Lockheed-Martin of Denver, Colorado, a subcontractor to Jacobs Engineering of Huntsville, Alabama, and is managed by Marshall Space Flight Center in Huntsville, Alabama.

=== Commemorative payload ===
Three shoebox-size packages were affixed inside the fifth segment simulator of the first stage to carry:

- Three DVDs with 60-second home videos recorded by the public and submitted through NASA's website.
- 3,500 flags to be distributed to Ares I-X team members.

== Processing ==
=== Ground operations ===
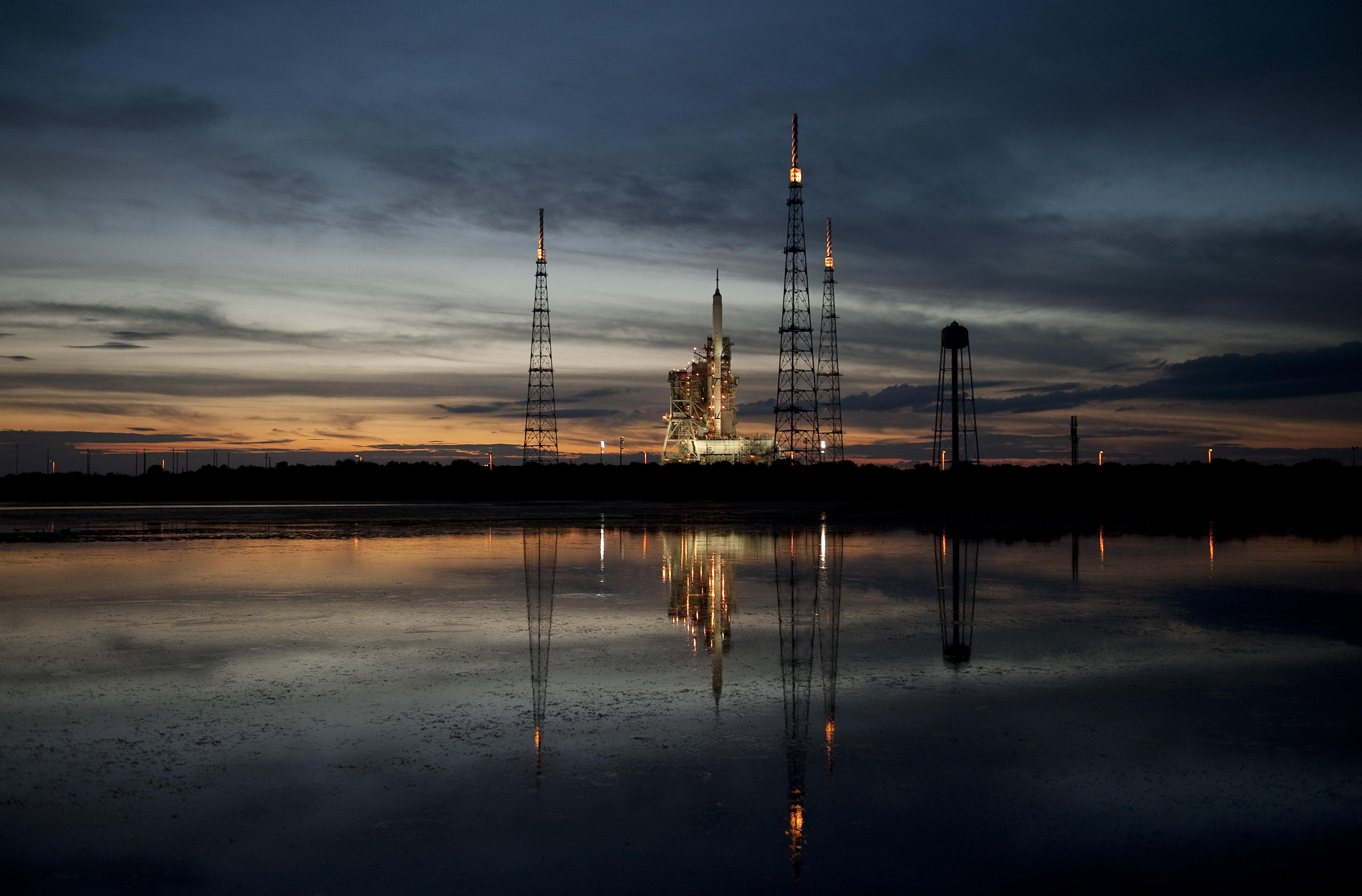
Ares I-X at the Launch Pad

Ground operations include activities such as vehicle stacking, integration, rollout, and liftoff, while ground systems include vehicle interfaces and lightning protection. Several new procedures and hardware items were developed for Ares I-X, including:

- A new, taller lightning protection system for Launch Complex 39B, which is taller than the existing tower used for Space Shuttle operations.
- A Shuttle-era VAB Firing Room 1 was completely remodeled and updated with new computer hardware to support Constellation and dedicated as the Young-Crippen Firing Room named after astronauts John Young and Bob Crippen in September 2009
- A new Mobile Launch (ML) gantry was constructed using universal connectors to allow commercial vehicles to launch using ML. ML was used in the test flight.
- Several systems on the Crawler Transporter were updated
- A platform inside the Vehicle Assembly Building was removed to allow the Ares I-X vehicle to fit and roll out.
- A new vehicle stabilization system (VSS), which kept the vehicle from swaying on the launch pad after rollout. The VSS uses off-the-shelf hydraulic shock absorbers from the Monroe division of Tenneco, Inc.
- Environmental control systems (ECS) regulated temperatures inside the VSS and fifth segment simulator to keep the avionics and ground crew cool.
- The ECS interfaces to the rocket are "T-0" units, meaning they disconnected from the launch vehicle automatically when the countdown reached zero.

Ground operations and ground systems were handled by United Space Alliance and NASA personnel at Kennedy Space Center.

=== Systems engineering and integration ===
The Ares I-X Systems Engineering & Integration (SE&I) Office, managed by the NASA Langley Research Center, was responsible for integrating the vehicle's parts into a complete rocket and making sure they work together as a system to meet flight test objectives. SE&I was responsible for ensuring all components functioned collectively to satisfy primary and secondary mission objectives. Detailed management of system interfaces, mission level requirements, validation plans, and flight instrumentation management were key SE&I contributions. SE&I provided the structural, thermal and aerodynamic analyses for the overall system to allow the components to be designed and built. SE&I also managed the mass of the vehicle and developed the trajectory and the guidance, navigation, and control algorithms used for vehicle flight.

To complete these tasks, wind tunnel testing and computational fluid dynamics (CFD) were used to investigate forces acting on the vehicle in various phases of flight, including lift-off, ascent, stage separation and descent. Once the basic design was understood SE&I provided structural analyses for the system to assure the rocket would behave properly once it was integrated.

Schedule development, management and control was provided by ATK Schedule Analysts permanently located at the NASA Langley Research Center working through the TEAMS contract agreement between ATK and NASA Langley.

== Flight test ==
Attempt	Planned	Result	Turnaround	Reason	Decision point	Weather go (%)	Notes
1	27 Oct 2009, 8:00:00 am	Scrubbed	—	Weather	27 Oct 2009, 11:20 am (T−00:04:00 hold)		High clouds compounded by numerous technical problems and range safety concerns.
2	28 Oct 2009, 11:30:00 am	Success	1 day 3 hours 30 minutes				

=== October 27, 2009 (Launch attempt 1) ===
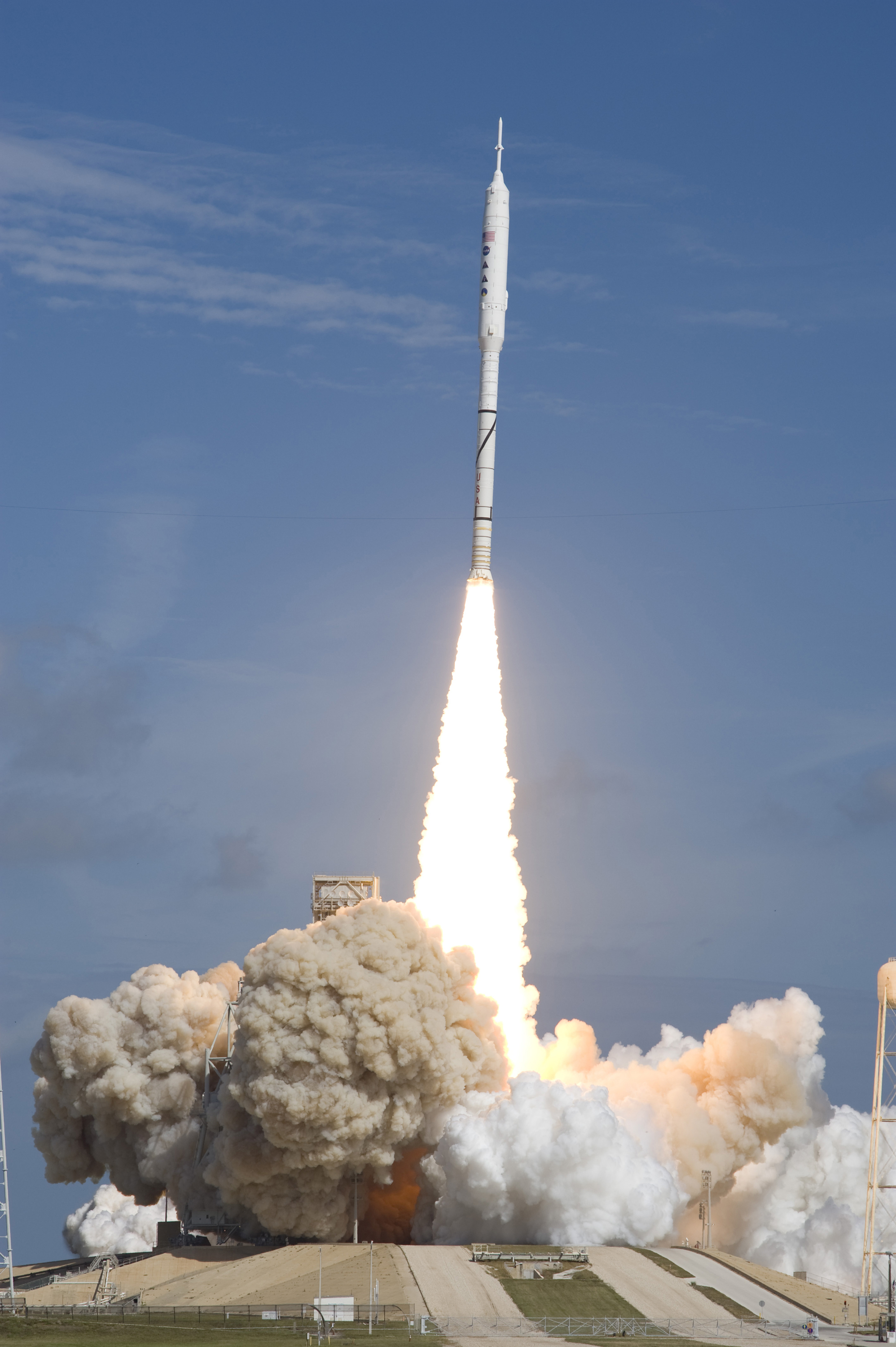
Ares I-X launches from LC-39B, 15:30 UTC, October 28, 2009. The dramatic yaw maneuver to clear the launch tower is evident in the photo.

Ares I-X had been scheduled for launch on October 27, 2009, the 48th anniversary of the first Saturn I launch. The launch attempt was delayed due to weather plus other last-minute concerns. The ground crew experienced difficulty removing a protective cover from an important nose-mounted five-port sensor package. A private watercraft had blundered into the restricted downrange safety zone and had to be chased away. Launching through the day's high cirrus clouds could have caused triboelectrification, potentially interfering with range safety communication and hampering the RSO's ability to issue the self-destruction command. Launch Director Ed Mango repeatedly delayed resumption of the countdown from the planned hold point at T−00:04:00. Ultimately, constraints of the 4-hour launch window, coupled with high clouds and other last-minute concerns, caused the mission to be scrubbed for the day at 15:20 UTC on October 27, 2009. Launch was rescheduled for a four-hour window opening at 12:00 UTC on October 28, 2009.

=== October 28, 2009 (Launch) ===
Ares I-X launch video

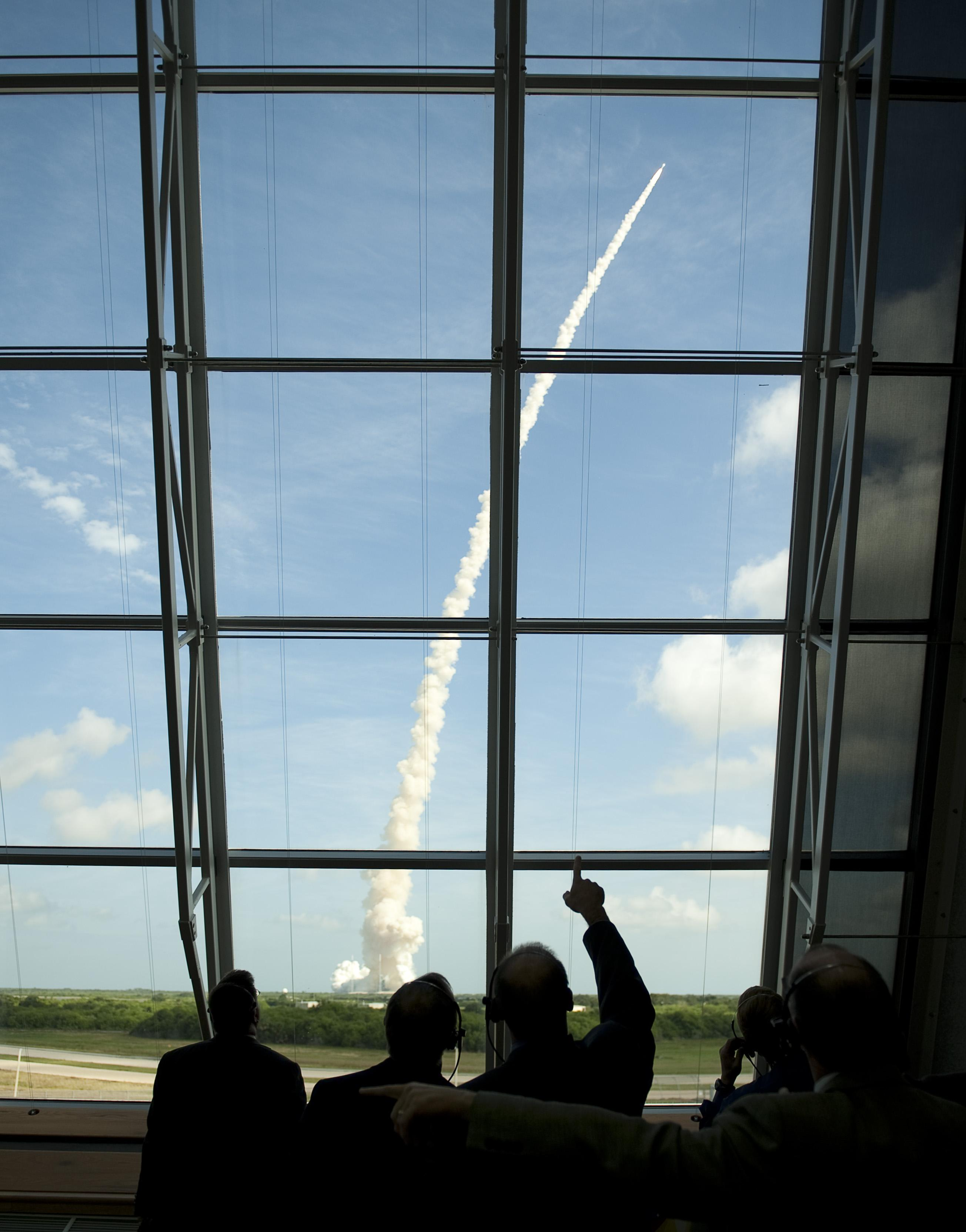
Mission managers watch the launch.

Ares I-X launched on October 28, 2009, at 11:30 EDT (15:30 UTC) from Kennedy Space Center LC-39B, successfully completing a brief test flight. The vehicle's first stage ignited at T−0 seconds and Ares I-X lifted off from Launch Complex 39B. The first stage separated from the upper-stage simulator and parachuted into the Atlantic Ocean roughly 150 miles (240 km) downrange of the launch site. The maximum altitude of the rocket was not immediately known, but had been expected to be 28 miles (45 km).

The launch accomplished all primary test objectives, and many lessons were learned in preparing and launching a new vehicle from Kennedy Space Center.

==== Thrust oscillation ====
Prior to the flight there had been some concern among NASA scientists and among Ares critics and skeptics that the thrust oscillation would prove too violent for human astronauts to safely ride an Ares rocket. NASA Watch revealed that the first-stage solid rocket booster of the Ares I could create high vibrations during the first few minutes of ascent. The vibrations are caused by sudden acceleration pulses due to thrust oscillations inside the first stage. NASA admitted that this potential problem was very real, rating it four out of five on a risk scale, while also remaining confident that they could solve the problem, referring to a long history of successful problem solving. NASA officials had known about the problem since fall 2007, stating in a press release that they had wanted to solve it by March 2008. According to NASA, analysis of the data and telemetry from the Ares I-X flight showed that vibrations from thrust oscillation were within the normal range for a Space Shuttle flight.

==== Pad damage ====
Approximately two hours after launch of Ares I-X, safing crews entering pad LC-39B reported a small cloud of residual nitrogen tetroxide leaking from an obsolete shuttle oxidizer line at the 95-foot (29 m)-level of the Fixed Service Structure, where it connects to the Rotating Service Structure. At 8:40 am on October 29, 2009, a hydrazine leak was detected on the 95-foot (29 m)-level, between the Payload Changeout Room and the Fixed Service Structure. Both leaks were capped without injury to personnel.

Due to the Pad Avoidance Maneuver performed by Ares I-X, shortly after liftoff, the Fixed Service Structure at LC-39B received significantly more direct rocket exhaust than occurs during a normal Space Shuttle launch. The resulting damage was reported as "substantial," with both pad elevators rendered inoperable, all communication lines between the pad and launch control destroyed and all outdoor megaphones melted. The vehicle-facing portions of the Fixed Service Structure appear to have suffered extreme heat damage and scorching, as do the hinge columns supporting the Rotating Service Structure. This damage was anticipated as NASA intended to remove the FSS and launch future Ares flights from a "clean pad".

==== Parachute malfunction ====
During the flight, a pyrotechnic charge on the reefer, which holds the chute together, was set off early while still inside the parachute, causing the parachute to overload and fail on deployment. The added stress on the second parachute caused it to overload and partially fail as well. The two remaining parachutes guided the booster to a rough landing, but it luckily sustained minimal damage. The parachute lanyard design was changed as well to prevent repeat incidents.

According to NASA, partial parachute failures were common in Space Shuttle Solid Rocket Boosters, from which the Ares I-X is derived. Eleven partial parachute failures occurred on Space Shuttle SRBs, including on STS-128.

==== First-stage damage ====
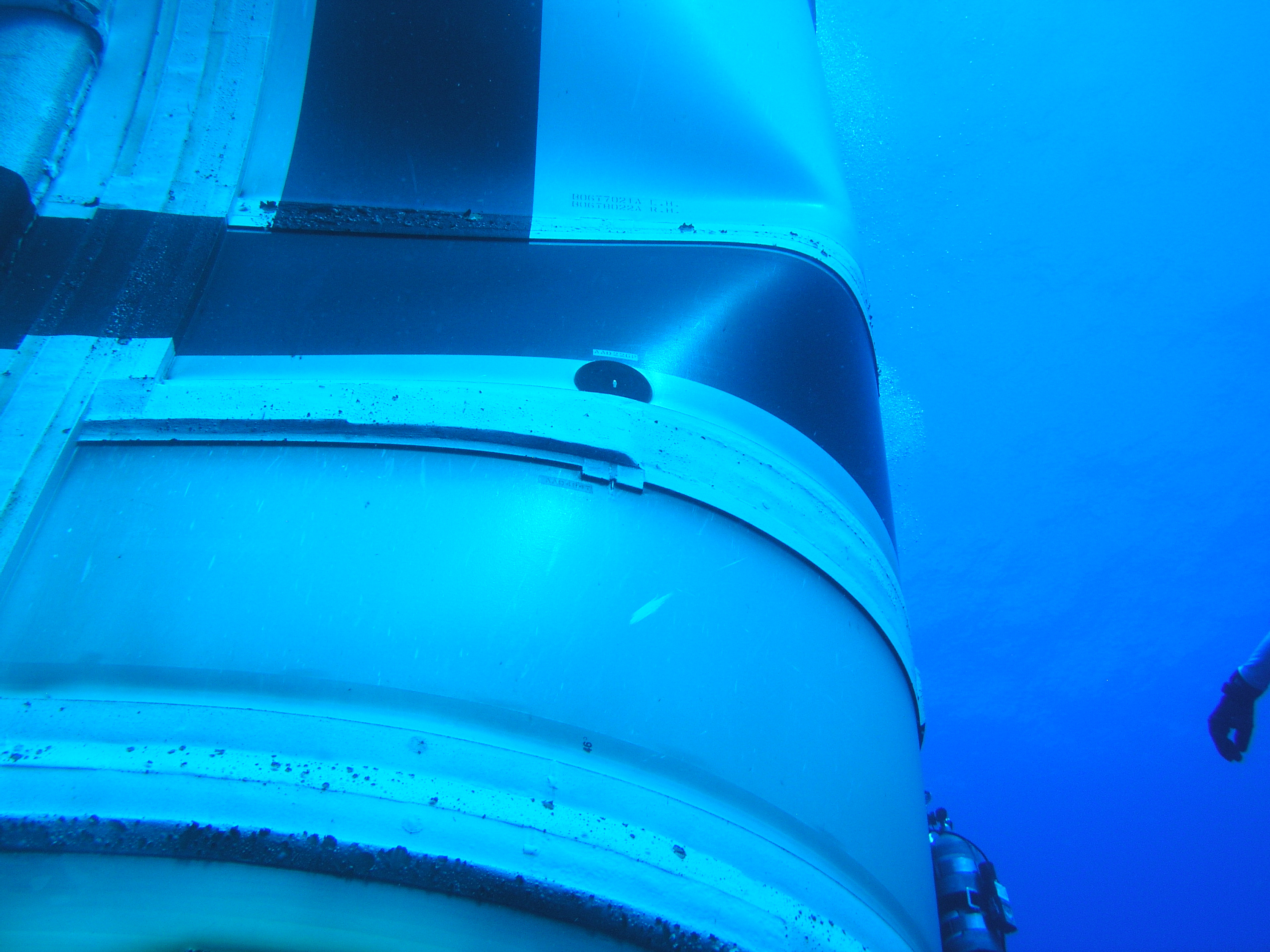
A portion of the large dent in the first-stage lower segment, as photographed by divers from the recovery vessel MV Freedom Star.

The first stage was found floating upright, as is typical of expended Space Shuttle Solid Rocket Boosters. However, recovery divers noted buckling of the lower portion. Reports also note an apparent fracture of the booster's forward segment casing and a fractured bracket that held an actuator, part of the SRM's nozzle vectoring system. A NASA memo states that engineers believe that the lower segment buckled when the first stage landed at a much higher speed than designed as a result of one of three main parachutes failing to deploy, as well as the failure of a second main parachute to remain deployed. It is unclear, at this point, what caused the apparent casing fracture and broken bracket, and NASA has not commented on this damage.

==== Upper Stage Simulator flat spin ====
The unpowered Upper Stage Simulator (USS), which was not meant to be retrieved, impacted further out into the Atlantic Ocean. The USS began to tumble, in a counterclockwise flat spin, almost immediately after staging. After initial concerns that the motion might have been caused by a collision between the USS and the first stage, further analysis showed that no actual recontact happened and that the tumble had been one of the possible behaviours predicted by pre-flight simulations.

The USS was not a precise match to the characteristics of a real Ares I upper stage, and was not intended to test the upper stage's independent performance. The fact that the upper stage was not powered, and separated at a lower altitude than the real upper stage would on the final Ares I, contributed to the spin.
