= STS-70 =

1995 American crewed spaceflight to deploy a Tracking and Data Relay Satellite

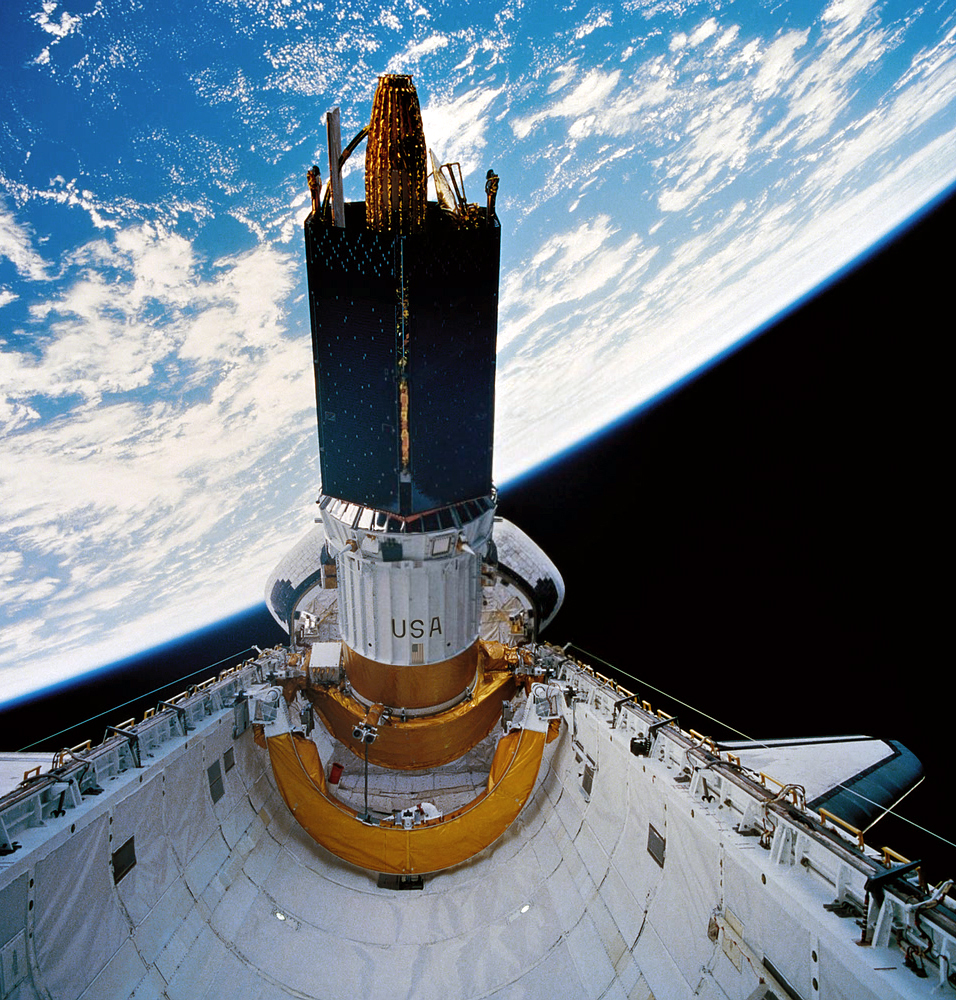
- Discovery prepares to deploy the TDRS-G satellite
- Names: Space Transportation System-70
- Mission type: Satellite deployment
- Operator: NASA
- COSPAR ID: 1995-035A
- SATCAT no.: 23612
- Mission duration: 8 days, 22 hours, 20 minutes, 05 seconds
- Distance travelled: 6,000,000 kilometres (3,700,000 mi)
- Orbits completed: 143

Spacecraft properties
- Spacecraft: Space Shuttle Discovery
- Payload mass: 20,159 kilograms (44,443 lb)

Crew
- Crew size: 5
- Members: Terence T. Henricks; Kevin R. Kregel; Nancy J. Currie; Donald A. Thomas; Mary Ellen Weber

Start of mission
- Launch date: July 13, 1995, 13:41:55.078 UTC, (9:41:55 am EDT)
- Launch site: Kennedy, LC-39B

End of mission
- Landing date: July 22, 1995, 12:02 UTC, (8:02:00 am EDT)
- Landing site: Kennedy, SLF Runway 33

Orbital parameters
- Reference system: Geocentric
- Regime: Low Earth
- Perigee altitude: 257 kilometres (160 mi)
- Apogee altitude: 257 kilometres (160 mi)
- Inclination: 28.45 degrees
- Period: 90.5 min
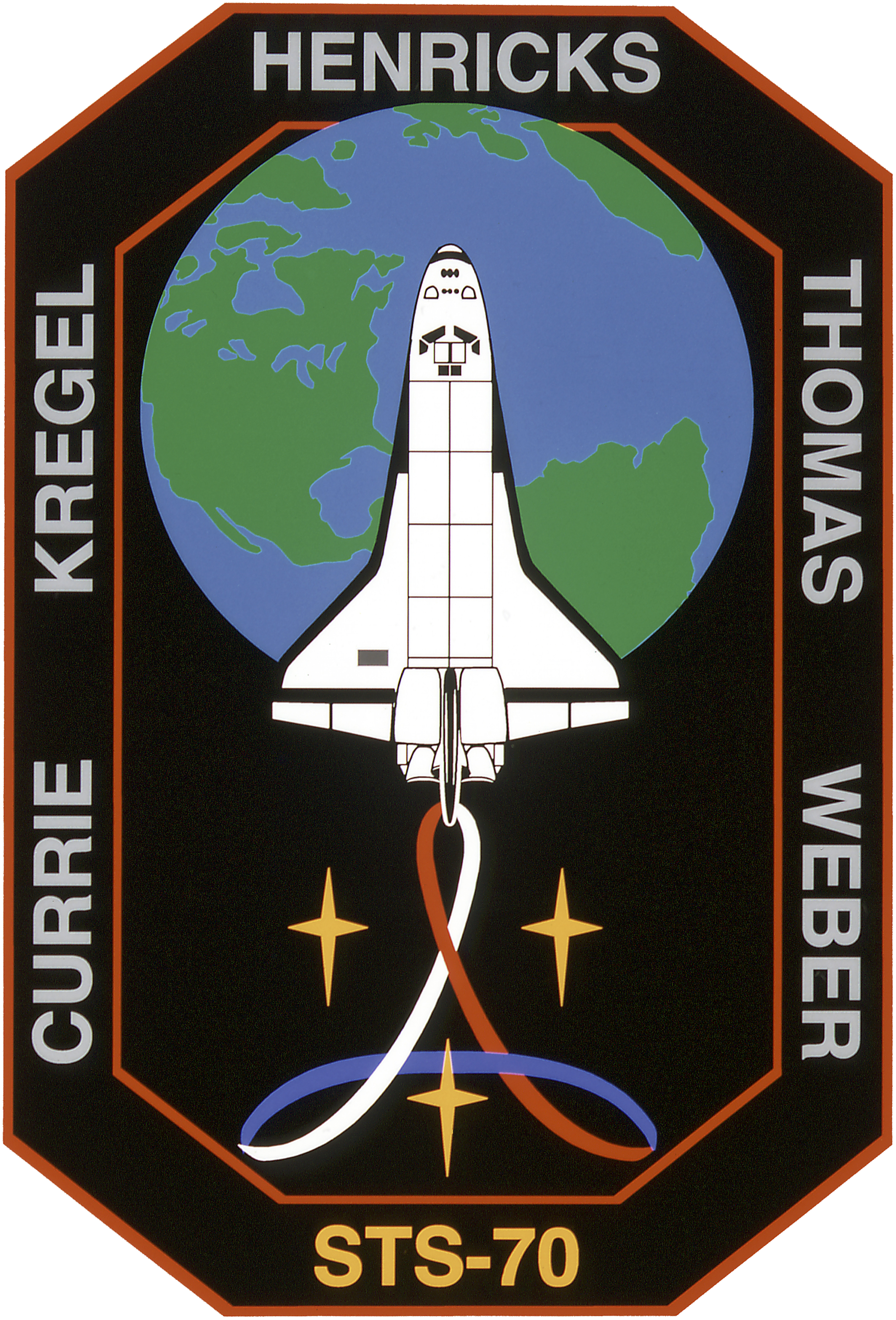
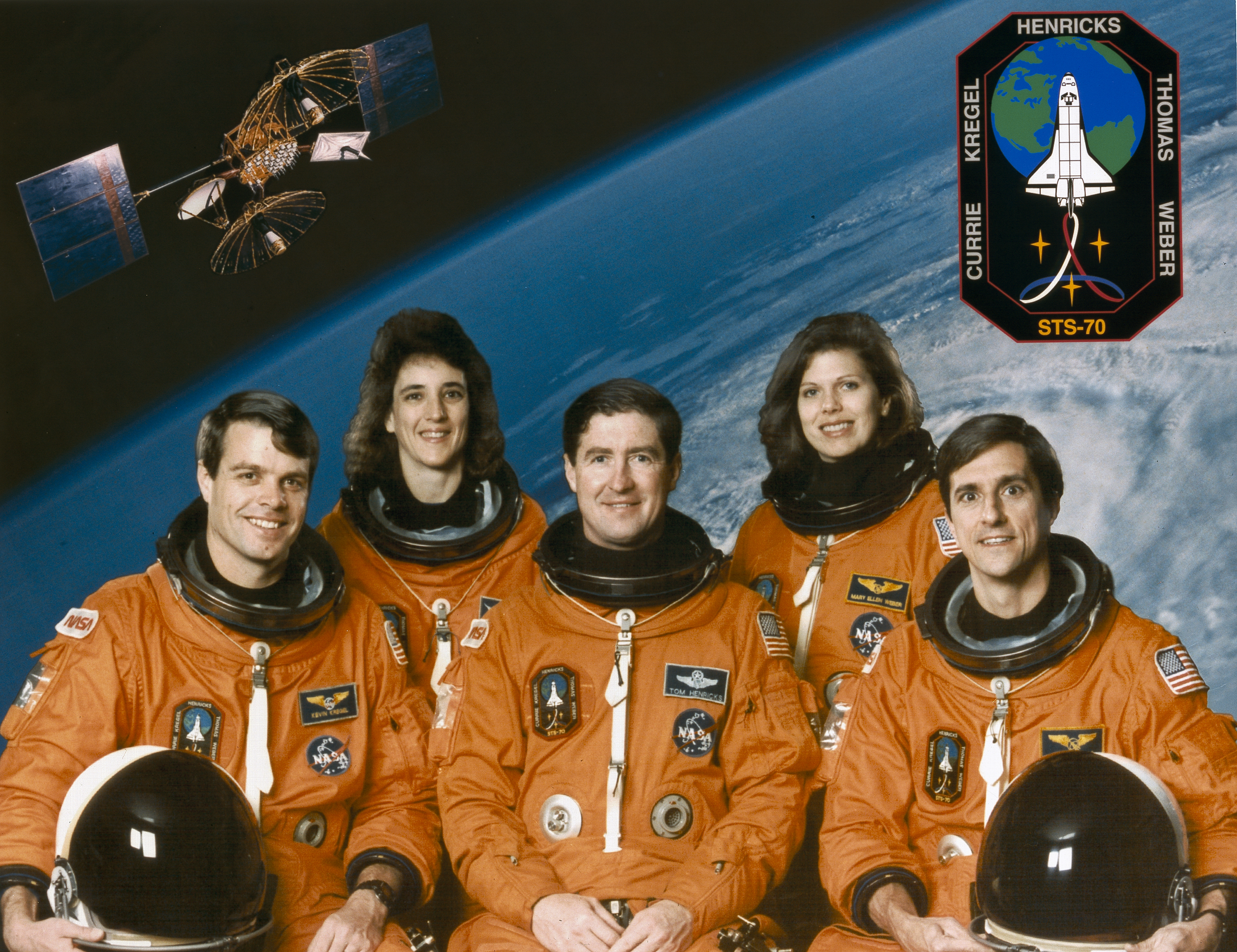
- Left to right: Kregel, Currie, Henricks; Weber, Thomas Space Shuttle program

STS-70 was the 21st flight of the Space Shuttle Discovery, and the last of 7 shuttle missions to carry a Tracking and Data Relay Satellite (TDRS). This was the first shuttle mission controlled from the new mission control center room at the Johnson Space Center in Houston.

STS-70 was also the first flight of the new Block 1 orbiter main engine, designed to improve both engine performance and safety. The mission was launched from Kennedy Space Center in Florida on July 13, 1995, only six days after the landing of sister ship Atlantis, marking the fastest turnaround between flights in the history of the program.

== Crew ==
Position	Astronaut
Commander	Terence T. Henricks; Third spaceflight
Pilot	Kevin R. Kregel; First spaceflight
Mission Specialist 1	Donald A. Thomas; Second spaceflight
Mission Specialist 2 Flight Engineer	Nancy J. Currie-Gregg; Second spaceflight
Mission Specialist 3	Mary Ellen Weber; First spaceflight

=== Crew seat assignments ===
Seat	Launch	Landing	Seats 1–4 are on the flight deck. Seats 5–7 are on the mid-deck.
1	Henricks		Seats 1–4 are on the flight deck. Seats 5–7 are on the mid-deck.
2	Kregel		Seats 1–4 are on the flight deck. Seats 5–7 are on the mid-deck.
3	Thomas	Weber	Seats 1–4 are on the flight deck. Seats 5–7 are on the mid-deck.
4	Currie		Seats 1–4 are on the flight deck. Seats 5–7 are on the mid-deck.
5	Weber	Thomas	Seats 1–4 are on the flight deck. Seats 5–7 are on the mid-deck.
6	Unused		Seats 1–4 are on the flight deck. Seats 5–7 are on the mid-deck.
7	Unused		Seats 1–4 are on the flight deck. Seats 5–7 are on the mid-deck.

== Preparations and launch ==
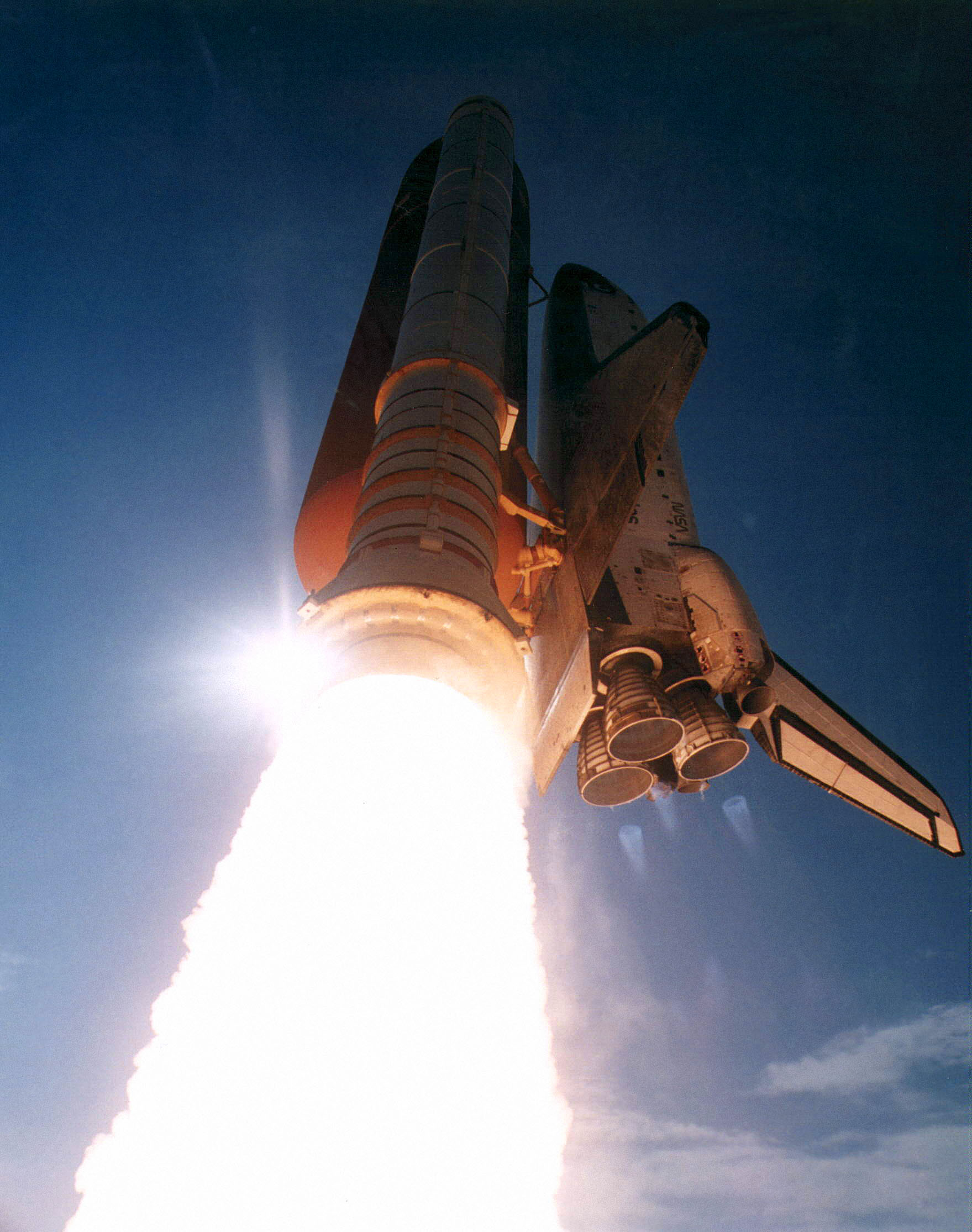
Liftoff of the 70th Space Shuttle mission.

STS-70 had originally moved ahead of STS-71 because of a delay in the launch of the Russian Spektr laboratory module to the Russian space station Mir. However, on May 31, 1995, shuttle managers assessed damage to the External Tank of STS-70 caused by nesting flicker woodpeckers. The damage consisted of about 71 holes (ranging in size from 4 inches in diameter to 1/2 inch in diameter) in the ETs thermal protection foam insulation. Technicians installed safeguards against additional damage. On June 2, NASA managers decided to delay the launch of Discovery in order to make repairs to the insulation, and STS-71 was moved ahead of STS-70. Discovery was rolled back to the VAB on June 8, and was returned to the pad on June 15.

Launch occurred on July 13, 1995, at 9:41:55.078 a.m. EDT. The launch window was 2 hours 30 min. The hatch was closed at 8:13 am EDT and the count proceeded smoothly until T−31 sec. The count was held for 55 seconds at T−31 sec by the Booster Range Safety Engineer (CBRS) Tod Gracom at the LCC C-5 Console due to fluctuations seen on the external tank automatic gain control (AGC) ET range safety system receiver. Launch Commit Criteria contingency procedures were worked and the count then proceeded on schedule. STS-70 marked the maiden flight of the new Block 1 orbiter main engine. Engine number 2036 featured the new high-pressure liquid oxygen turbopump, a two-duct powerhead, baffleless main injector, single-coil heat exchanger and start sequence modifications. The Block I engine flew in the number one position on Discovery. The other two engines were of the existing Phase II design.

== Mission highlights ==
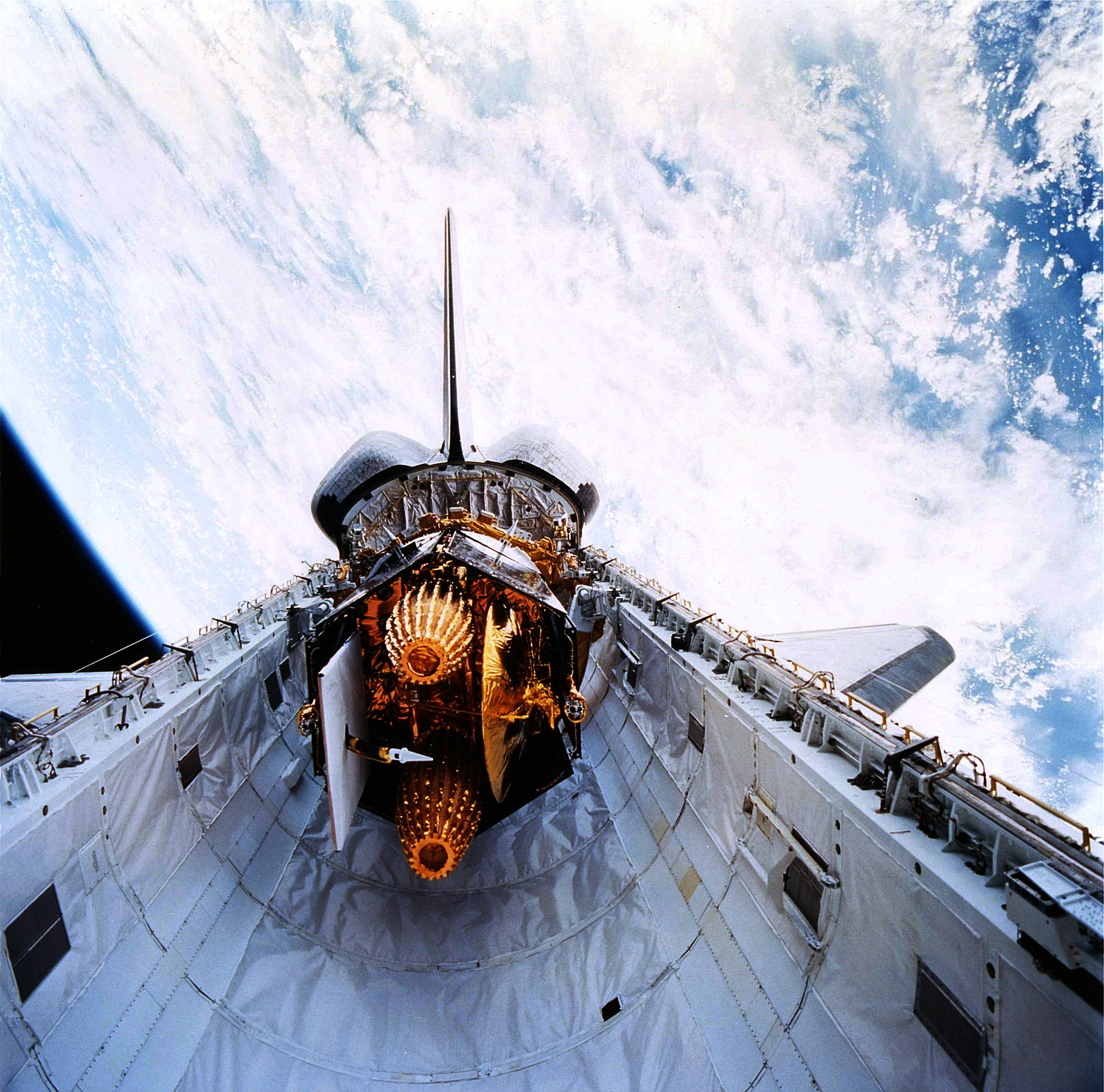
TDRS-G in Discovery's Payload Bay.

The primary mission was the launch and deployment of the 7th Tracking and Data Relay Satellite (TDRS-G) by means of the two-stage Inertial Upper Stage (IUS) solid rocket. It was built by TRW and weighs about 2,200 kilograms (4,900 lb). The satellite was ejected from Discovery's cargo bay exactly on time at 2:55 p.m. CDT, approximately six hours into the flight. The release of the satellite was overseen by Mission Specialists Donald Thomas and Mary Ellen Weber.

About 15 minutes later, Discovery's Commander Tom Henricks fired the shuttle's engines to raise the orbit and move away from the vicinity of the satellite and the IUS. At about 3:55 p.m., the IUS fired the first of two burns that would put TDRS-G into its proper, 22,000-mile-high geostationary orbit above the central Pacific Ocean at 178 degrees West longitude.

The deployment operations utilized three separate control centers; the White Sands ground station controlled the TDRS, the JSC Mission Control Center (MCC) controlled the shuttle, and the Inertial Upper Stage (IUS) control center at Onizuka Air Force Base in Sunnyvale California controlled the booster stage. Once it reached its destination, the fully deployed satellite had a wingspan of 57 ft. The TDRS was the sixth placed in operational use. TDRS-1 was launched aboard STS-6 on 1983-04-04 with a scheduled lifetime of seven years. The second satellite, TDRS-B, was lost aboard Challenger on mission STS-51-L. TDRS-3 was deployed from STS-26, TDRS-4 from STS-29, TDRS-5 from STS-43 and TDRS-6 was deployed by STS-54. The on-orbit TDRS network was rearranged and included two fully operational spacecraft occupying the TDRS East and West slots, one on-orbit fully functional spare, TDRS-1, which was nearly depleted having exceeded its planned lifetime, and the partially operational TDRS-3 spacecraft dedicated to supporting the Compton Gamma Ray Observatory and providing coverage an area that can't be seen by the other satellites known as the Zone of Exclusion.

== Additional payloads and experiments ==
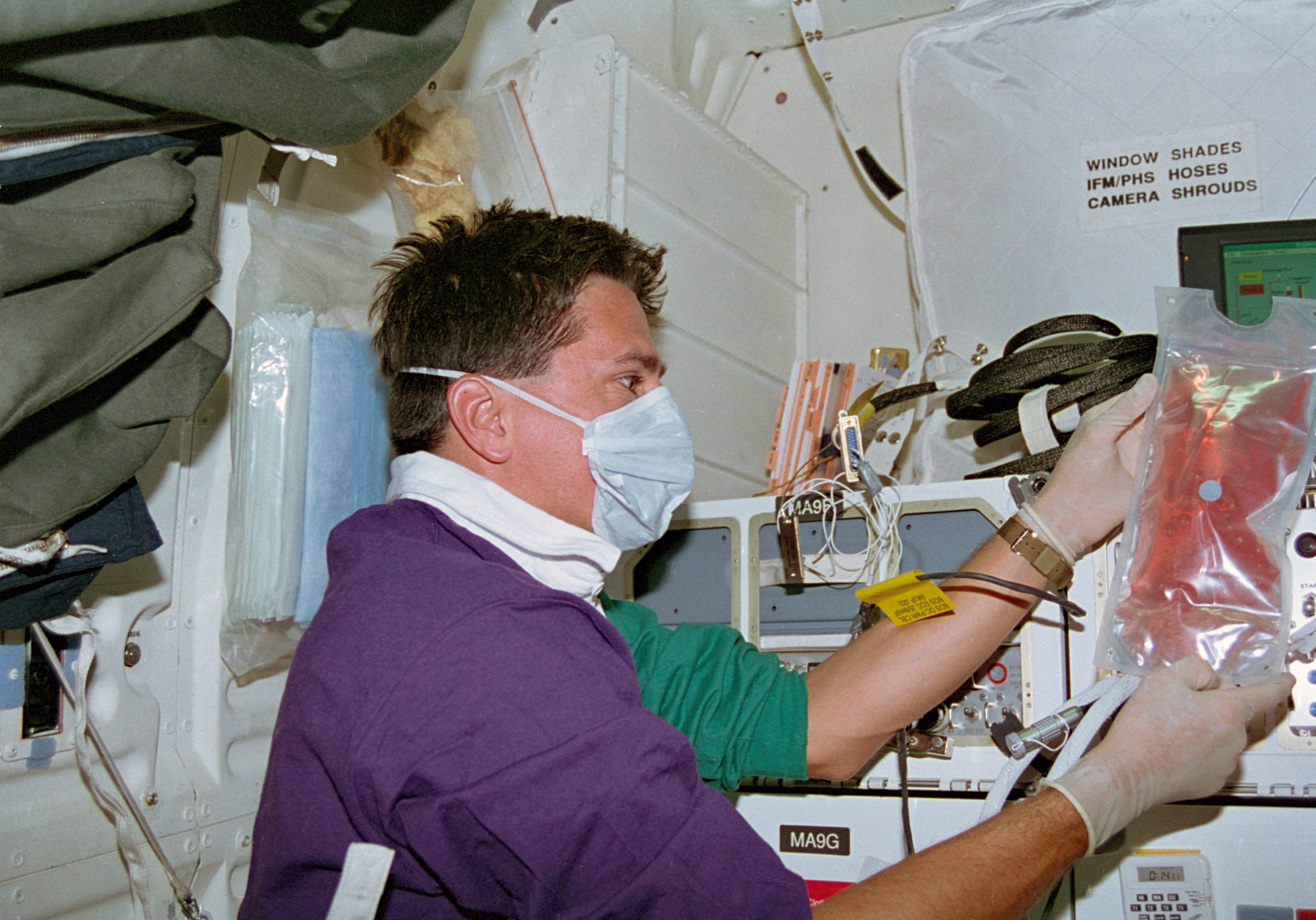
Mission Specialist Donald Thomas works with Bioreactor samples.

Secondary objectives of the mission were to fulfill the requirements of the Physiological and Anatomical Rodent Experiment / National Institutes of Health-Rodents (PARE/NIH-R); Bioreactor Demonstration System (BDS), Commercial Protein Crystal Growth (CPCG); Space Tissue Loss/National Institutes of Health-Cells (STL/NIH-C); Biological Research in Canisters (BRIC); Shuttle Amateur Radio Experiment-II (SAREX-II), Visual Function Tester-4 (VFT-4); Hand-Held, Earth Oriented, Real-Time, Cooperative, User-Friendly, Location-Targeting and Environmental System (HERCULES); Microcapsules in Space-B (MIS-B); Windows Experiment (WINDEX); Radiation Monitoring Equipment-III (RME-III); and the Military Applications of Ship Tracks (MAST).

The Bioreactor Demonstration System was designed to use ground-based and space-bioreactor systems to grow individual cells into organized tissue that is morphologically and functionally similar to the original tissue or organ. The BDS was composed of a device developed at the Johnson Space Center that used a rotating cylinder to suspend cells and tissues in a growth medium, simulating some aspects of microgravity. The system, which was already used extensively in ground-based research, also provided for gas and nutrient exchange. The purpose of the flight experiment was to demonstrate the performance of the bioreactor in actual microgravity. As such, the primary goal was to assess the fluid dynamic characteristics of the bioreactor in microgravity.

A club membership patch from the world famous Coney Island Polar Bear Club was carried on this mission.

== Landing ==
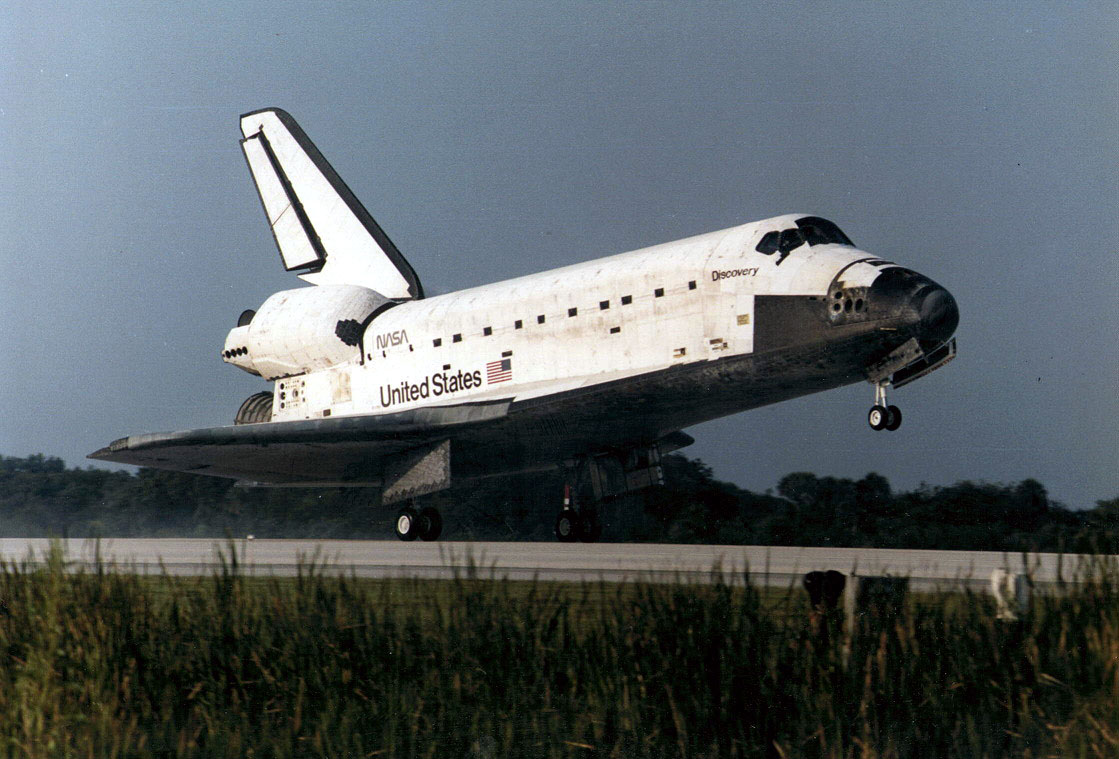
Discovery touches down at KSC

Landing opportunities at the Kennedy Space Center at 7:54 am EDT and 9:31 am July 21, 1995, were waved off due to a buildup of ground fog over the Shuttle Landing Facility. Flight Director Rich Jackson directed the five STS-70 astronauts to remain aloft for another day after poor visibility prevented Discovery's homecoming on the two consecutive landing opportunities. Discovery's astronauts were informed that their landing had been waved off for the day at 7:10 am CDT after astronaut Steve Oswald, flying weather reconnaissance in a Shuttle Training Aircraft over the landing strip, reported that he could not see the three-mile-long runway from his vantage point. STS-70 landed at the Kennedy Space Center on July 22, 1995, at 8:02 a.m. EDT on Runway 33. Nose gear touchdown occurred at 8:02:11 am EDT (Mission Elapsed Time of 8 days 22 hours 20 minutes and 16 seconds) with wheels stop at 8:02:57 am (MET of 8 d 22 h 21 min 2 s). An earlier KSC landing opportunity at 6:26 am EDT was waved off due to marginal yet improving weather conditions at KSC.

== Image gallery ==
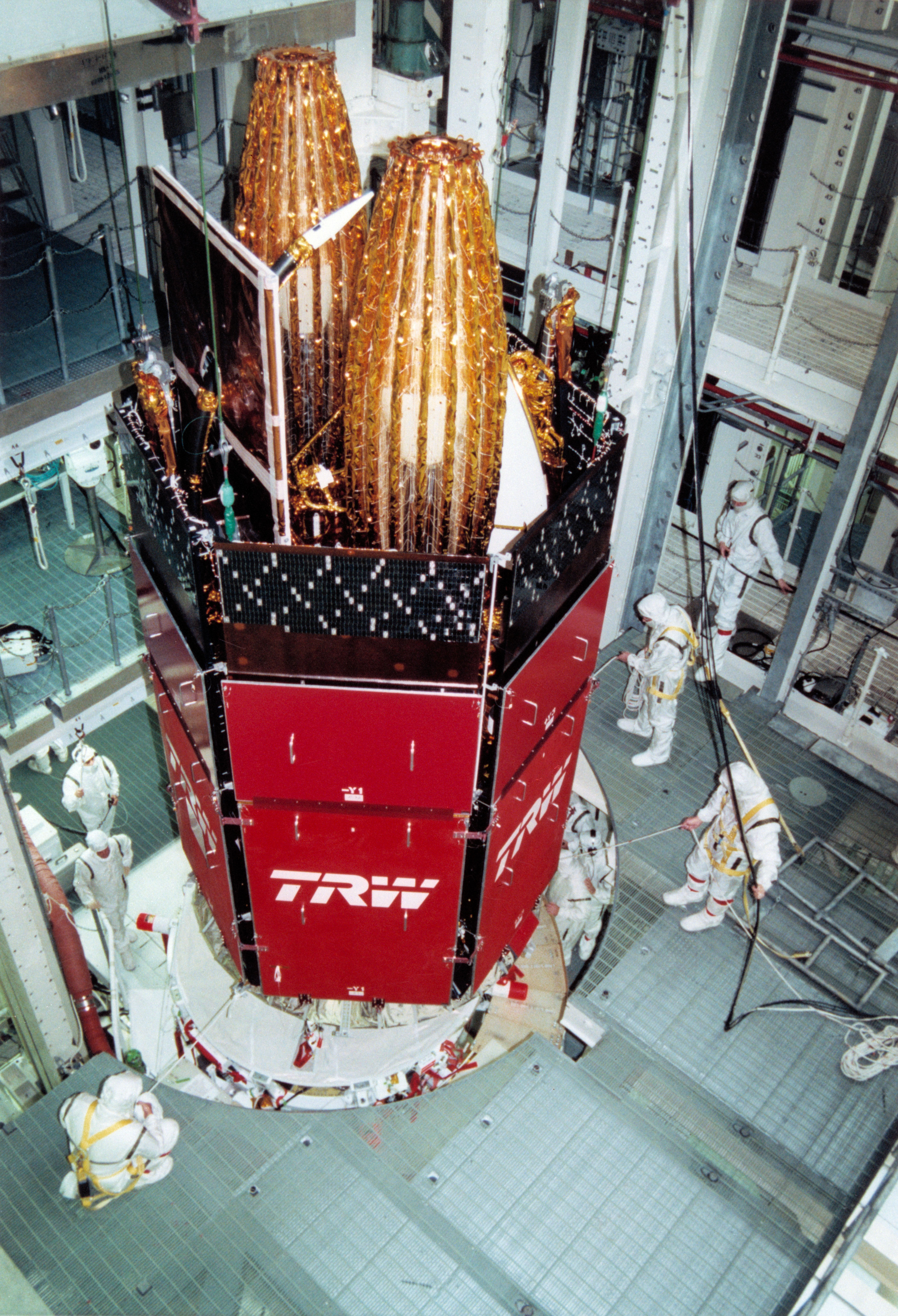
TDRS-G satellite.

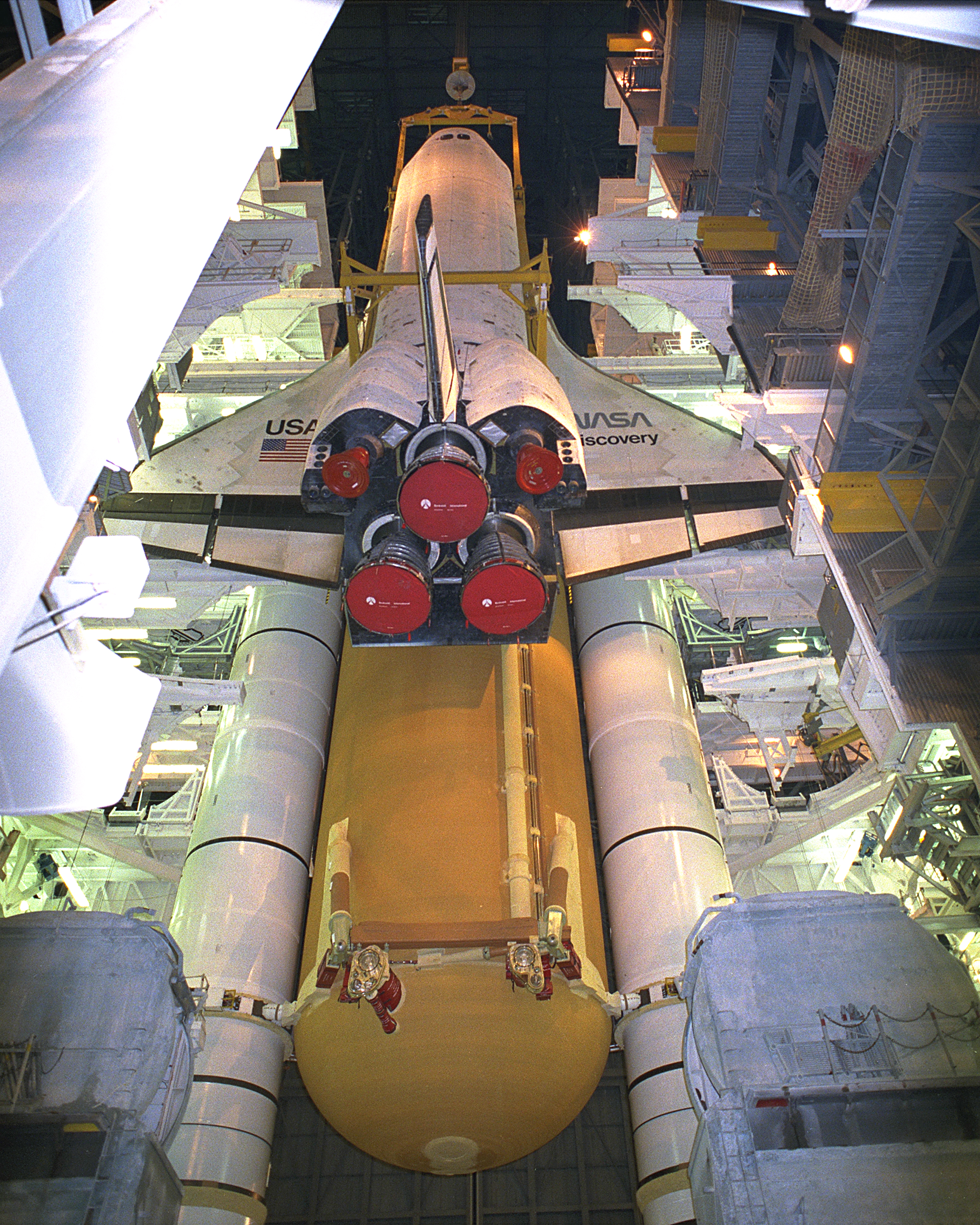
Discovery being lowered into position to be mated with its External Fuel tank.

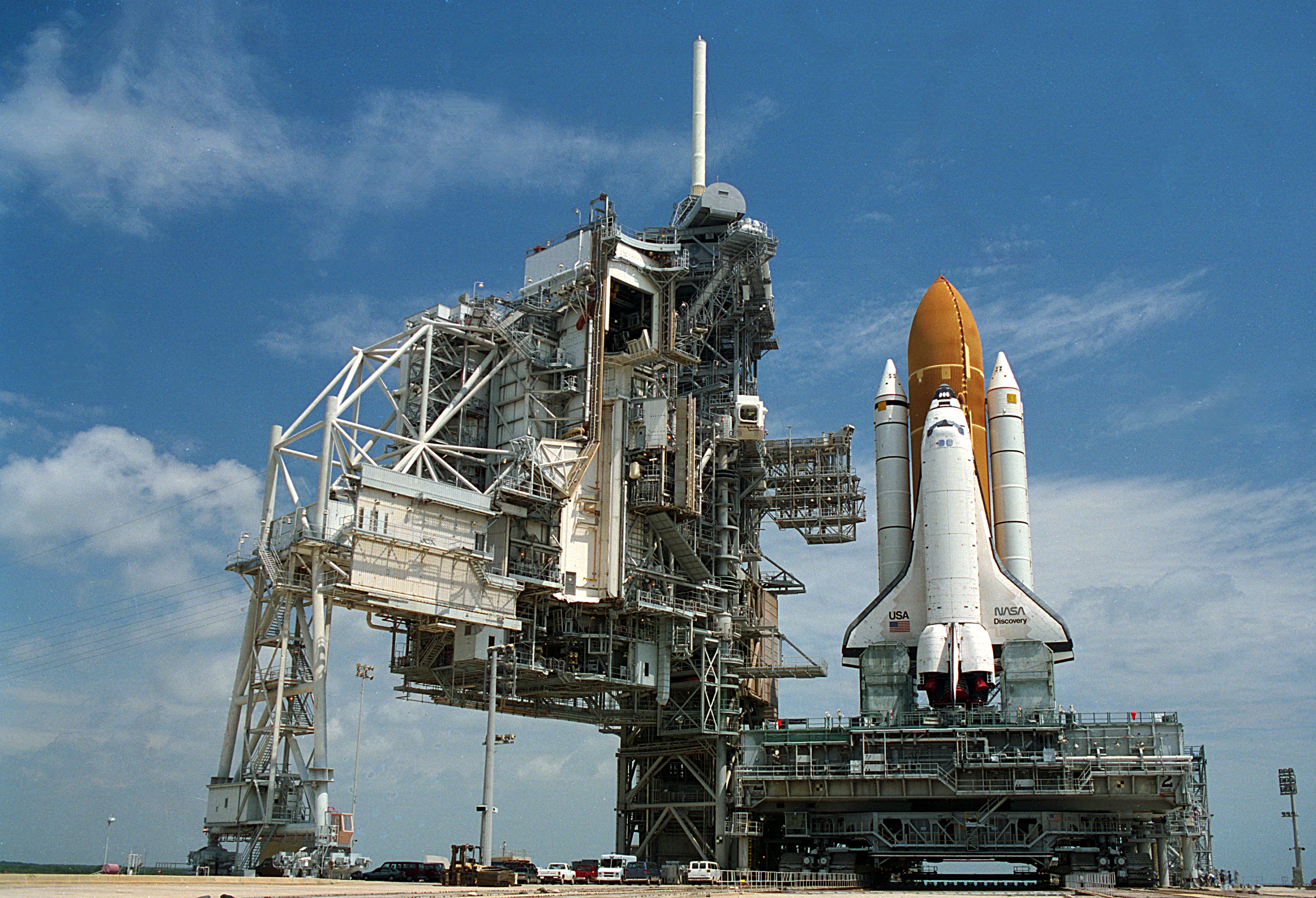
STS-70 Rollout on its Crawler Transporter with Mobile Launcher Platform to Launch Pad 39B

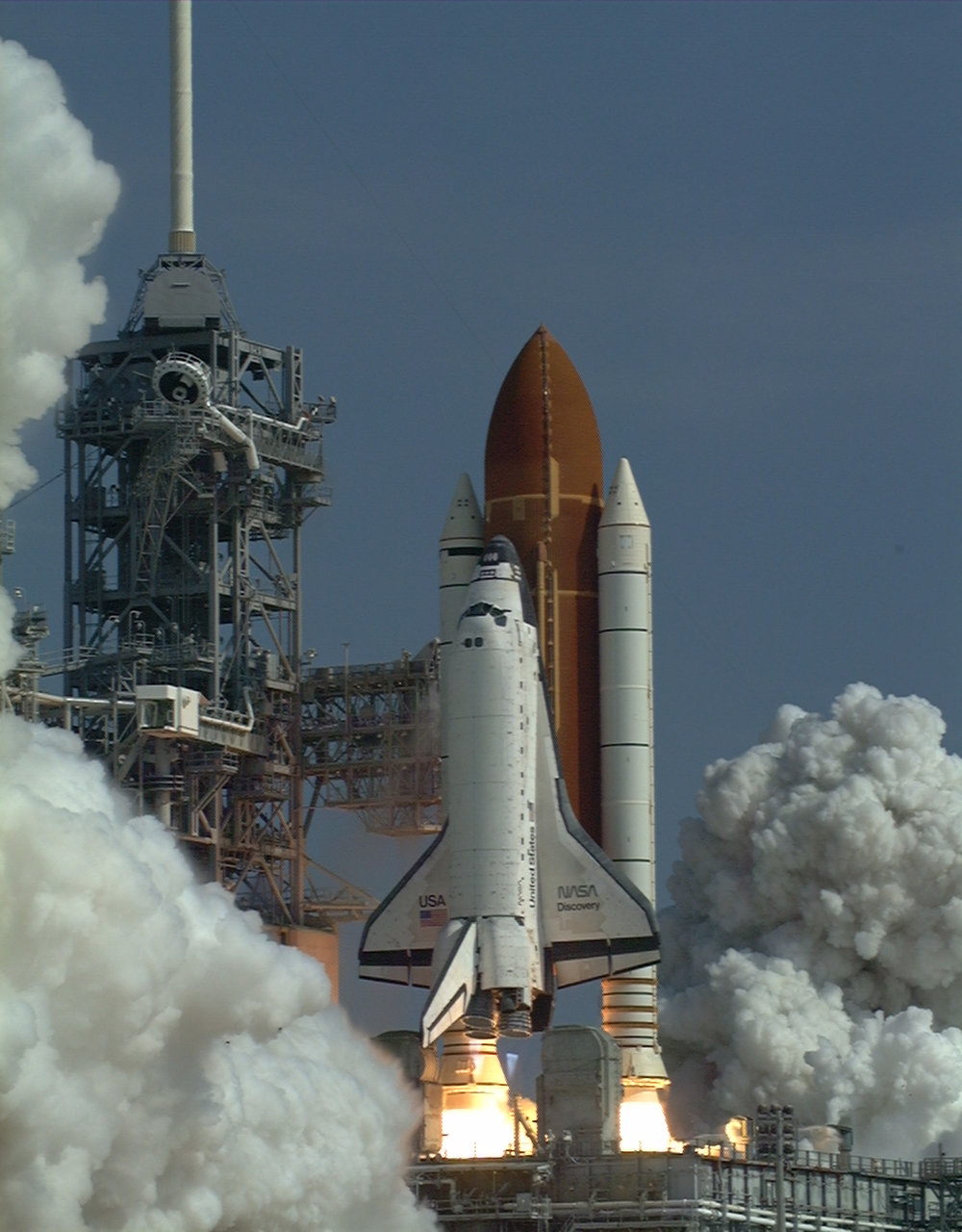
Space Shuttle Discovery STS-70 Launch. Taken with one of the first digital cameras: a Nikon E2.

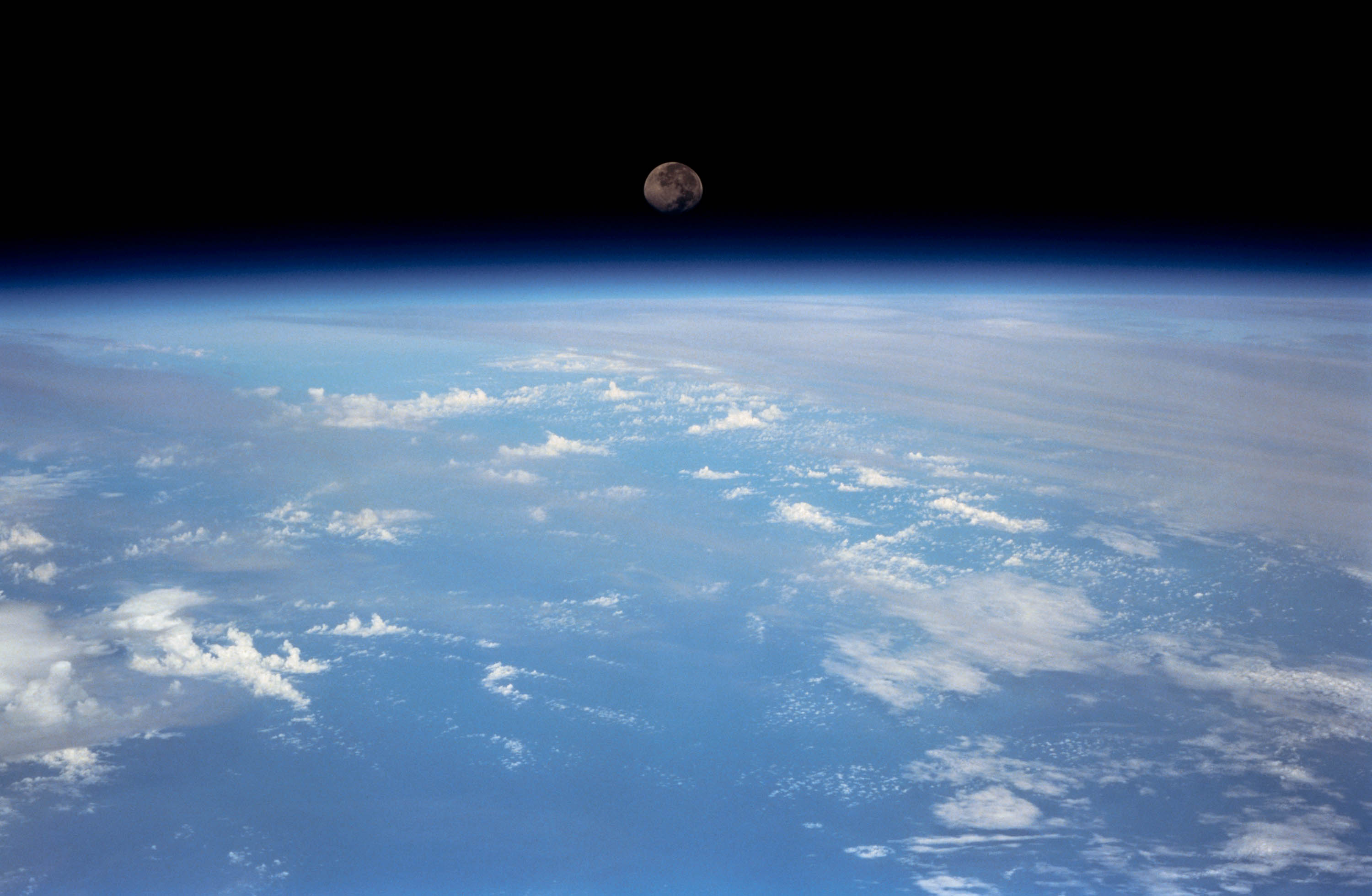
Moonrise viewed from the orbiter.

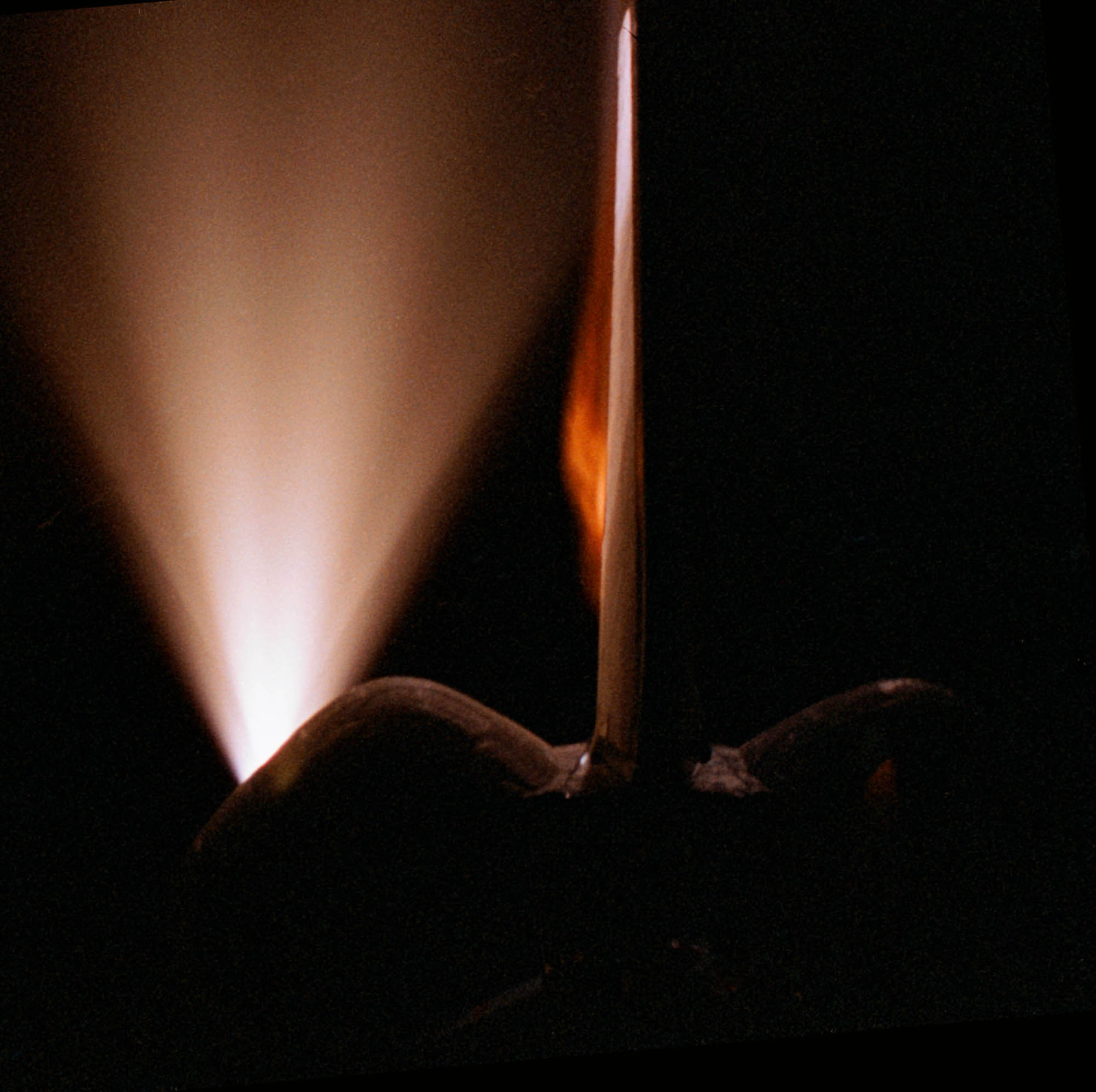
Thruster firing photographed in support of WINDEX experiment.

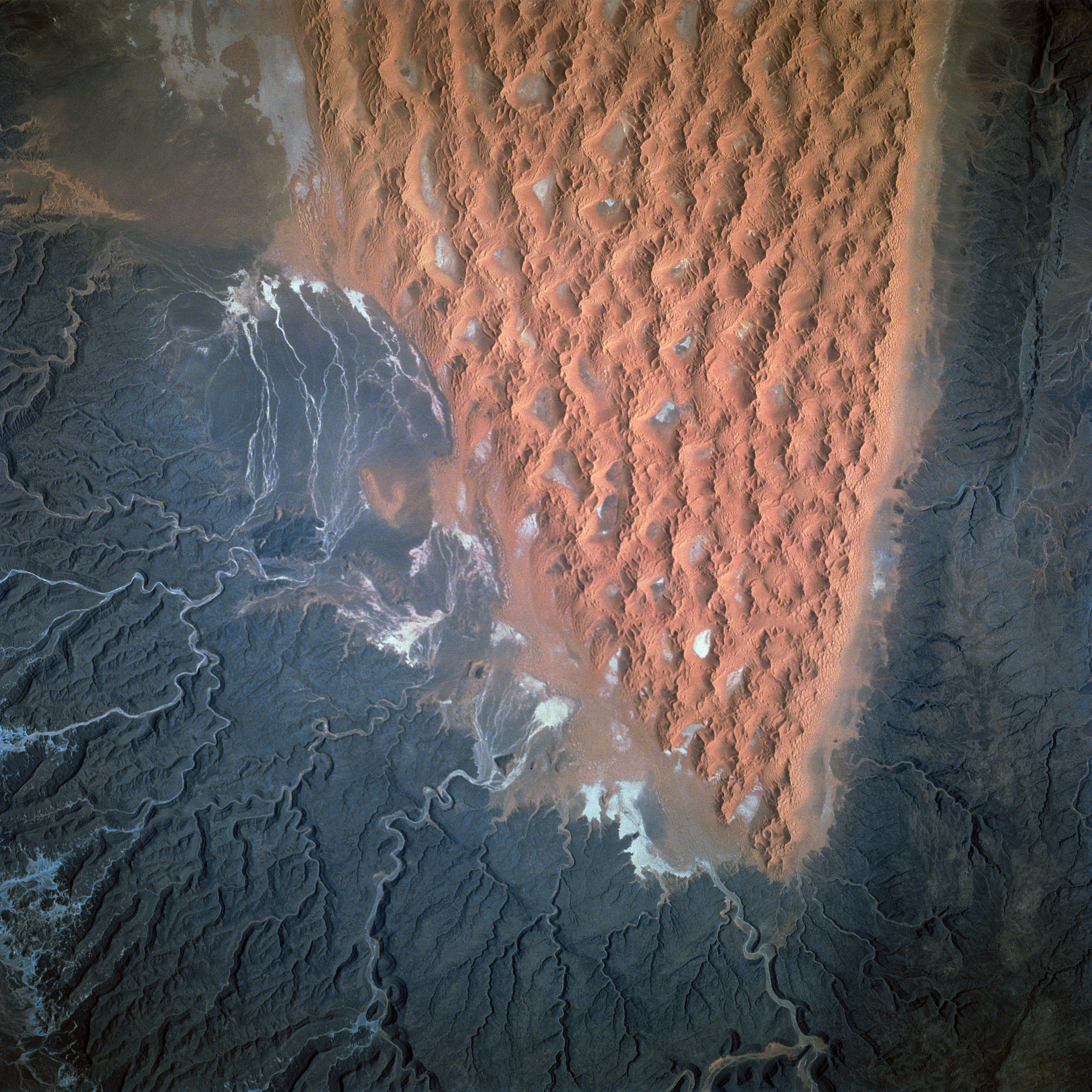
Dune fields in Algeria.

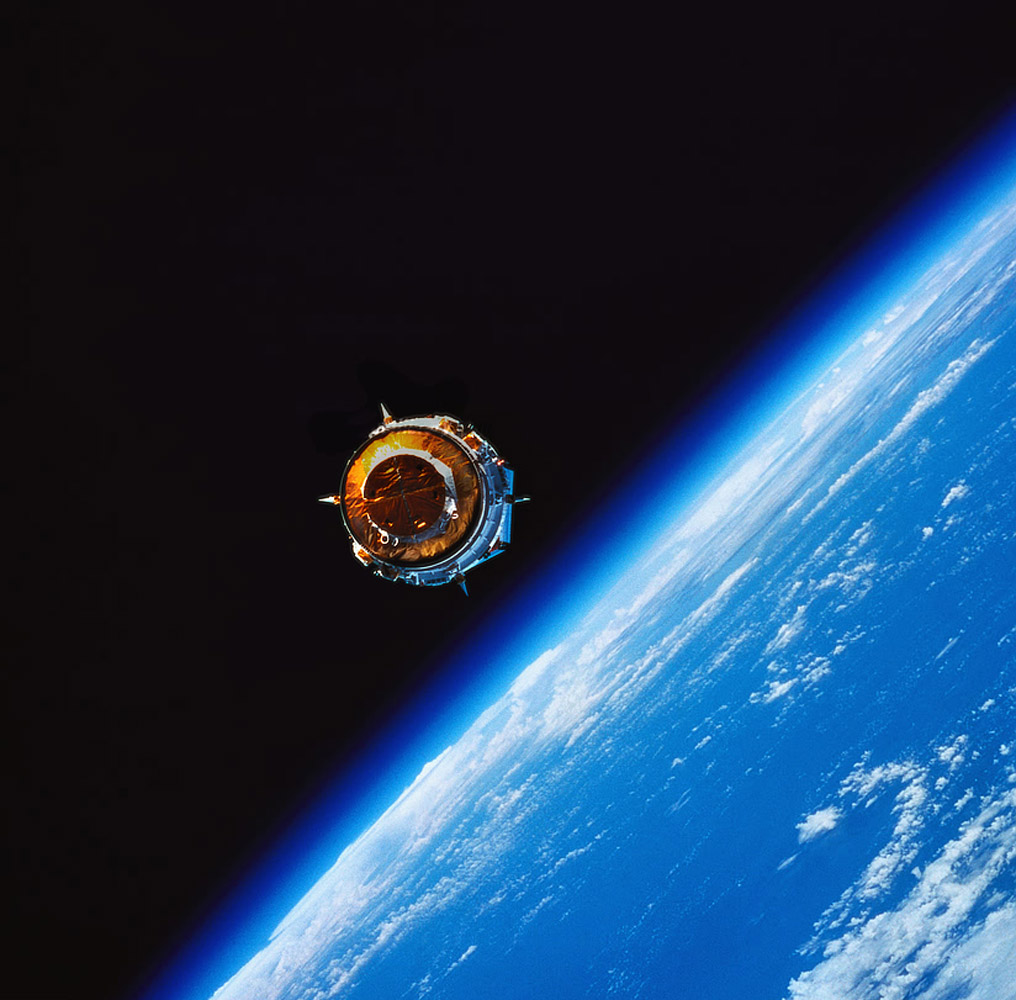
TDRS moving away following deployment.

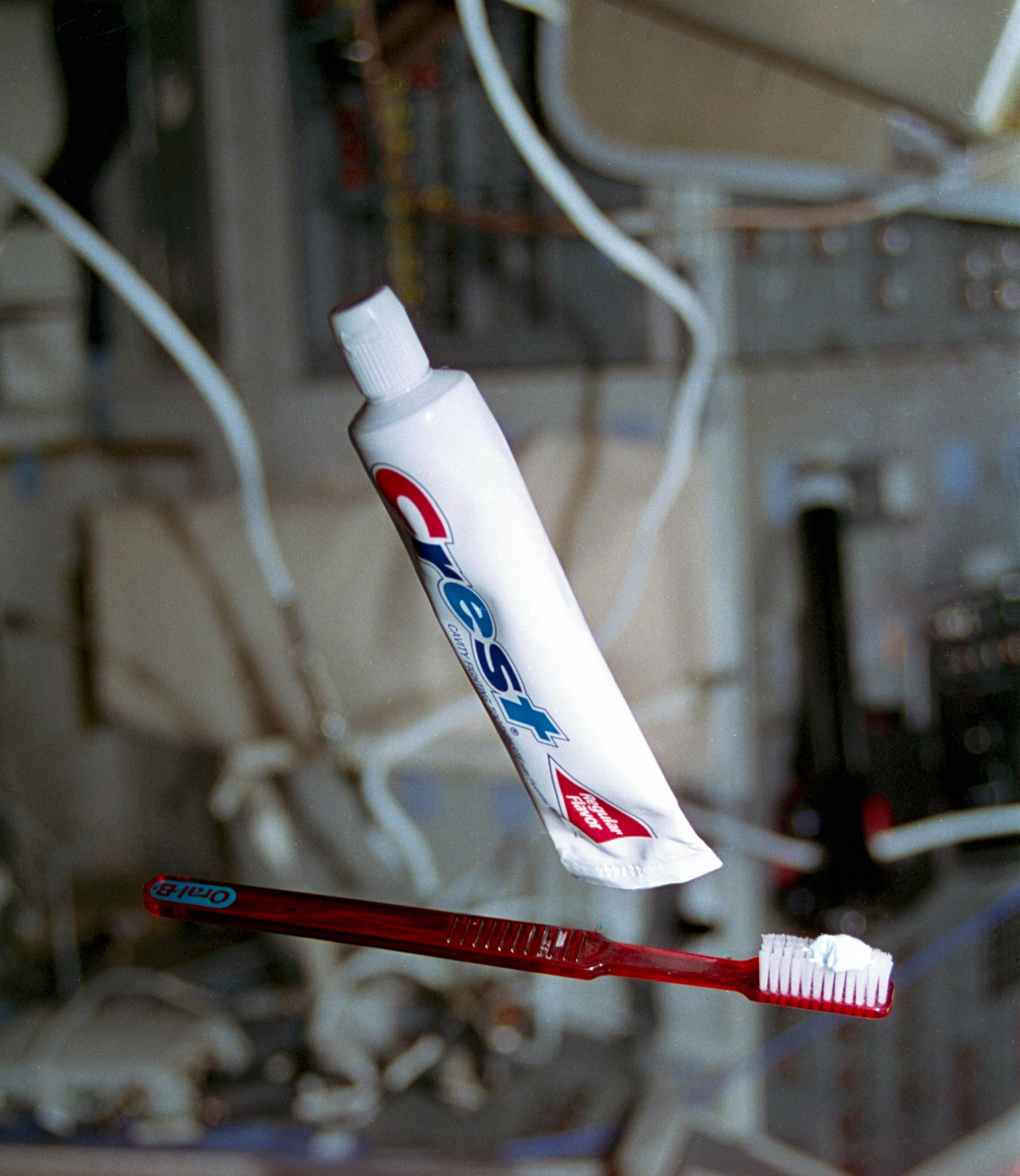
Toothbrush and tube of toothpaste floating in microgravity.

== See also ==
- List of human spaceflights
- List of Space Shuttle missions
- Outline of space science
- Space Shuttle
