= Mary Ellen Weber =

American astronaut (born 1962)

Mary Weber
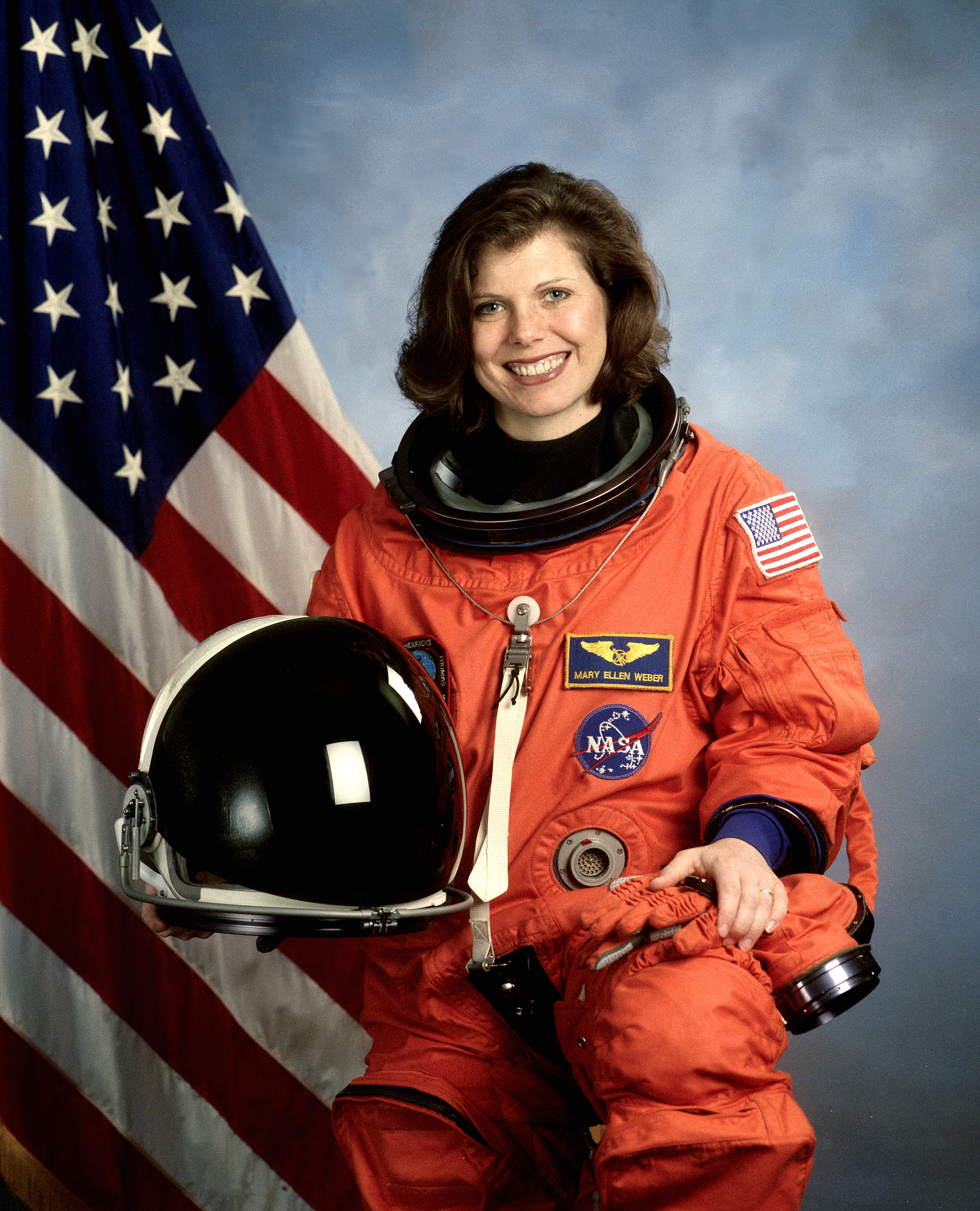
- Born: Mary Ellen Weber; August 24, 1962 (age 64); Cleveland, Ohio, U.S.
- Education: Purdue University (BS); University of California, Berkeley (MS, PhD); Southern Methodist University (MBA)
- Space career

NASA astronaut
- Time in space: 18d 18h 30m
- Selection: NASA Group 14 (1992)
- Missions: STS-70; STS-101
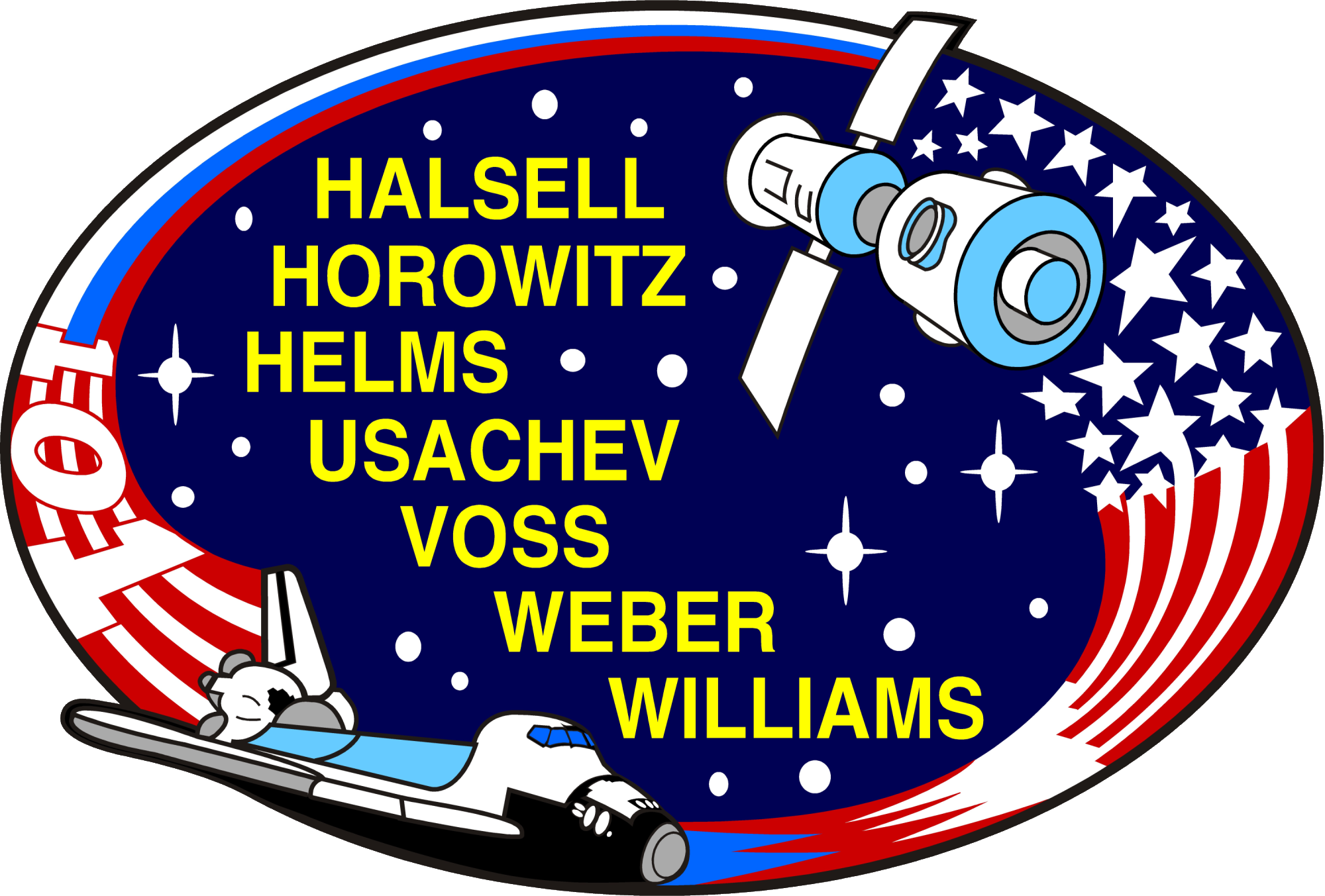
- Mission insignia

Mary Ellen Weber (born August 24, 1962) is an American executive, scientist, aviator, and a former NASA astronaut.

== Education ==
Weber was born in Cleveland, Ohio, and raised in Bedford Heights, Ohio. She graduated from Bedford High School in 1980; received a Bachelor of Science in chemical engineering (with honors) from Purdue University in 1984, where she was a member of Phi Mu sorority; received a Ph.D. in physical chemistry from the University of California, Berkeley in 1988; and received an Master of Business Administration from Southern Methodist University in 2002.

== Pre-NASA career ==
As an undergrad, Weber was a chemical engineering intern at Ohio Edison, Delco Electronics, and 3M. In her doctoral research at Berkeley, she explored the physics of chemical reactions involving silicon. At Texas Instruments she researched new processes and revolutionary equipment for making computer chips, with SEMATECH and Applied Materials. She holds one patent and published nine papers in scientific journals.

== NASA career ==
Weber was selected by NASA in the fourteenth group of astronauts in 1992. During her ten-year career with NASA, she held several positions. She worked extensively in technology commercialization, and as part of a team reporting to NASA's chief executive, she worked directly with a venture capital firm to successfully identify and develop a business venture leveraging a space technology. In addition, Weber was the Legislative Affairs liaison at NASA Headquarters in Washington, D.C., interfacing with Congress and traveling with NASA's chief executive. Prior to this appointment, she was chairman of the procurement board for the Biotechnology Program contractor, and she also served on a team that revamped the $2 billion plan for Space Station research facilities. Weber's principal technical assignments within the Astronaut Office included Shuttle launch preparations at the Kennedy Space Center, payload and science development, and development of standards and methods for crew science training. A veteran of two space flights, STS-70 and STS-101, she was among the youngest to fly in space and she logged over 450 hours. She is the recipient of the NASA Exceptional Service Medal. She resigned from NASA in December 2002.

=== Spaceflight experience ===
==== STS-70 ====
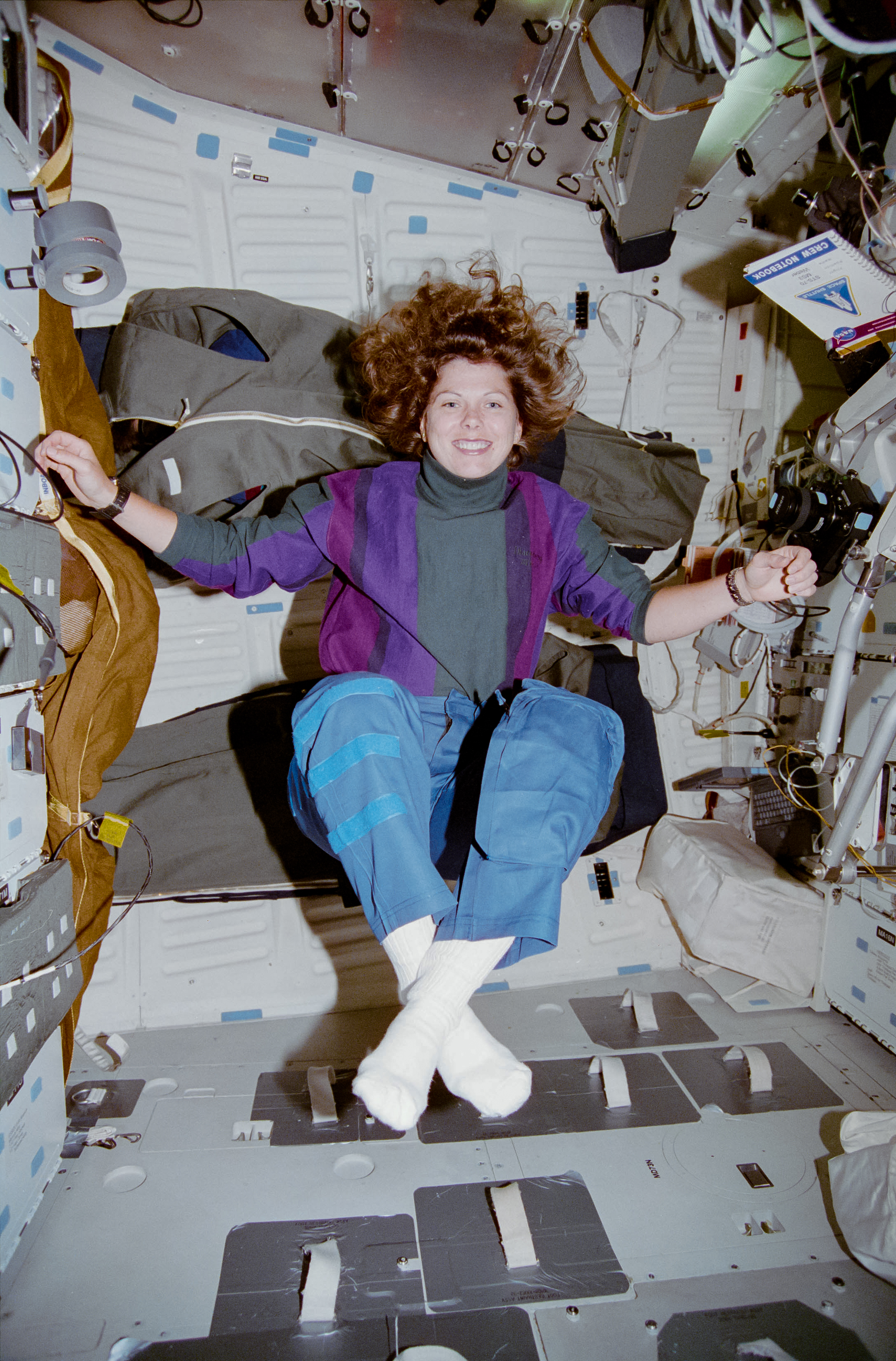
Weber floats in a yoga position during STS-70

Weber was mission specialist 3 on the crew of STS-70. Discovery launched from Kennedy Space Center Launch Complex 39B July 13, 1995, 13:41:55.078 UTC, STS-70 successfully delivered to orbit a critical $200 million NASA communications satellite, TDRS-G to its 22-thousand-mile orbit above the equator. Weber deployed the satellite and also performed pioneering biotechnology experiments, growing colon cancer tissues never before possible to later become a leading NASA biotechnology spokesperson in this field. She was the prime spacewalk crewmember in the event a malfunction required a spacewalk, crew medical officer, and flight deck crew member for landing. STS-70 was known for its "All-Ohio crew" and for its last-minute launch delay due to woodpeckers, becoming the "Woodpecker flight." The STS-70 mission was completed with a successful landing at the Shuttle Landing Facility July 22, 1995, 12:02 UTC after 142 orbits of the Earth, after traveling 3.7 million miles in 214 hours and 20 minutes.

==== STS-101 ====
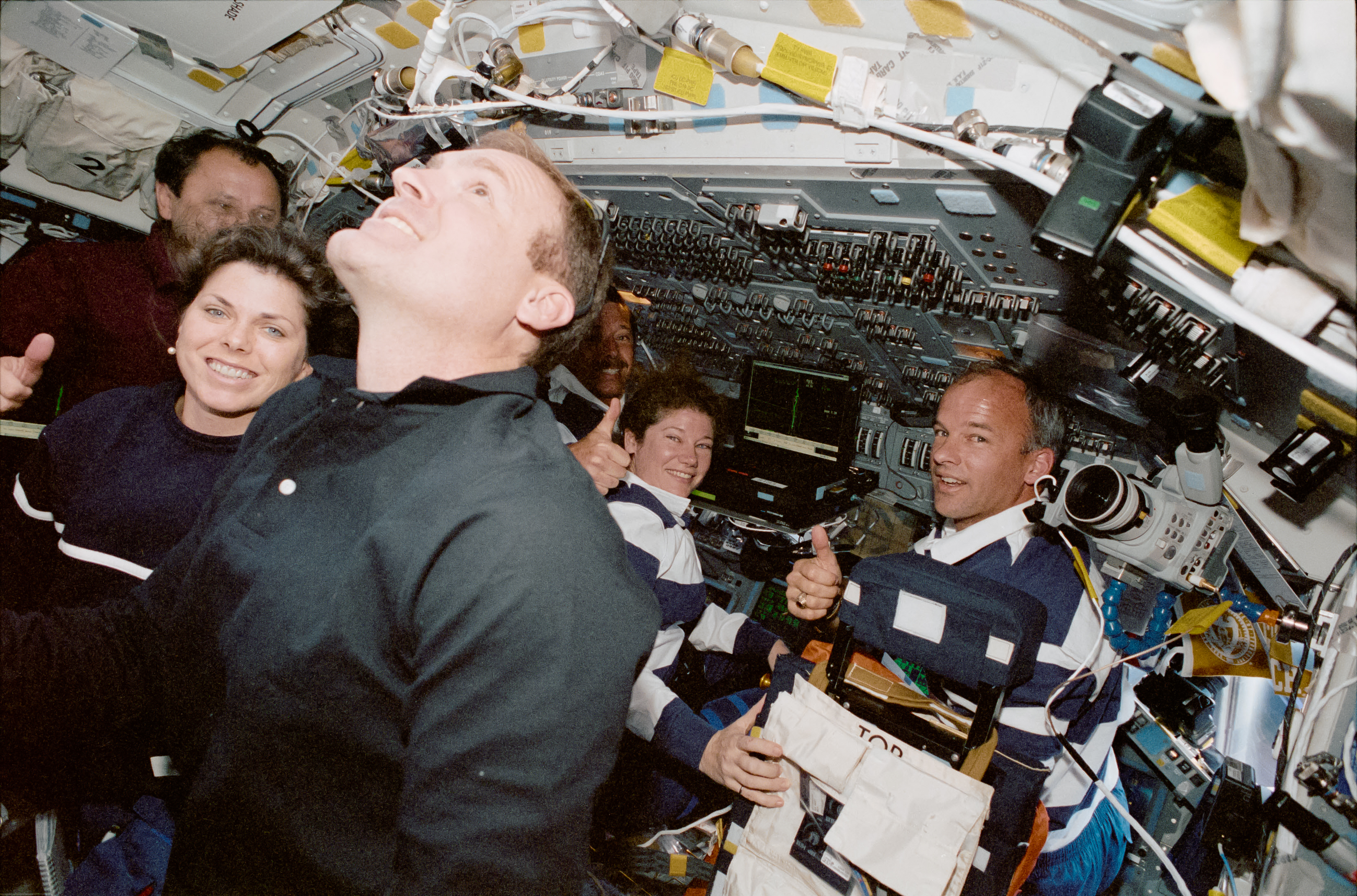
Weber (left) and her crewmates during STS-101 docking

Weber was mission specialist 1 on the crew of STS-101. Atlantis launched from Kennedy Space Center Launch Complex 39B May 19, 2000, 10:11 UTC. STS-101 was the third Shuttle mission devoted to International Space Station construction—a critical mission, with no mission to the fledgling Station in over a year and batteries failing. The crew repaired and installed electrical and life-support components, both inside and out, and boosted the Station to a safe orbit. Weber was a flight deck crew member for launch, landing and Station rendezvous, drove Atlantis' 60-foot robotic arm to maneuver spacewalk crewmembers along the Station surface, and directed the logistics and transfer of over three thousand pounds of equipment. She also developed new crew checklists for engine failures during ascent and new procedures for robotic arm operations. The STS-101 mission—the subject of an A&E documentary, Mission Possible—was completed with successful landing at the Shuttle Landing Facility May 29, 2000, 06:20 UTC after 155 orbits of the Earth, after traveling 4.1 million miles in 236 hours and 9 minutes.

== Post-NASA career ==
Weber is currently with Stellar Strategies, LLC, providing consulting services in strategies for operations in high-stakes business ventures, technology communications, and legislative strategy. She is also a speaker, with over twenty years of experience with a wide range of audiences and venues.

Prior to STELLAR Strategies, Weber was vice president for Government Affairs and Policy for nine years at the University of Texas Southwestern Medical Center in Dallas, Texas.

== Personal life ==
Weber is married to Jerome Elkind, who is originally from Bayonne, New Jersey.

Having logged nearly 6,000 skydives, Weber is an active skydiver, with 13 silver and bronze medals to date at the U.S. National Skydiving Championships and a world record in 2002 for the largest freefall formation with 300 skydivers. In addition, she is an instrument-rated pilot, a skier, and a scuba diver.
