= TDRS-7 =

American communications satellite

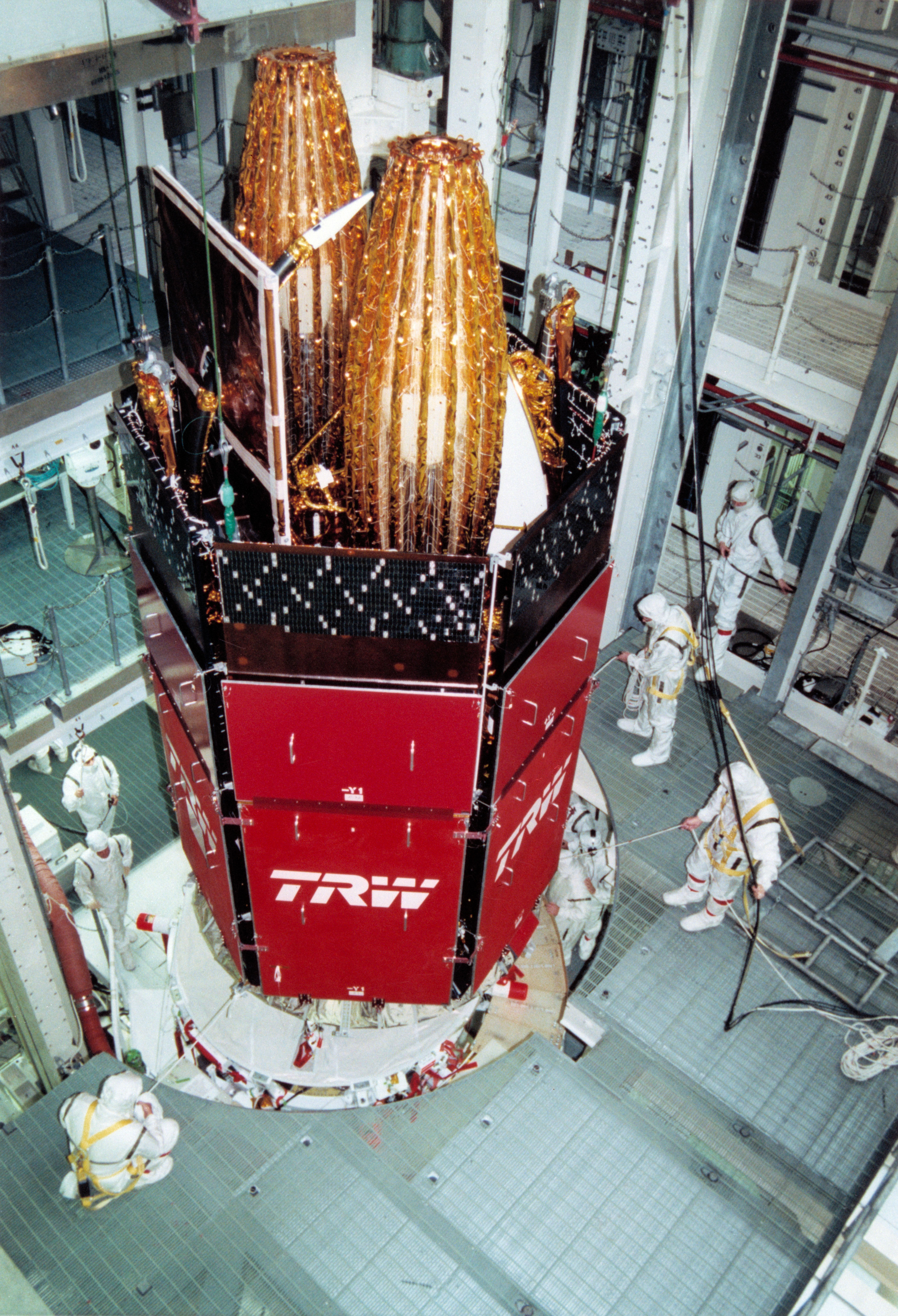
- TDRS-G before launch at Kennedy Space Center
- Mission type: Communication
- Operator: NASA
- COSPAR ID: 1995-035B
- SATCAT no.: 23613
- Mission duration: Planned: 10 years Elapsed: 30 years, 9 months and 11 days

Spacecraft properties
- Bus: TDRS
- Manufacturer: TRW
- Launch mass: 2,108 kilograms (4,647 lb)
- Dimensions: 17.3 metres (57 ft) long 14.2 metres (47 ft) wide
- Power: 1700 watts

Start of mission
- Launch date: 13 July 1995, 13:41:55 UTC
- Rocket: Space Shuttle Discovery; STS-70 / IUS
- Launch site: Kennedy Space Center, LC-39B
- Contractor: Rockwell International

Orbital parameters
- Reference system: Geocentric orbit
- Regime: Geostationary orbit
- Longitude: 150.0° West (1995–1996); 171.0° West (1996–2003); 150.5° West (2003–)
- Epoch: 14 July 1995

TDRS-7, known before launch as TDRS-G, is an American communications satellite, of first generation, which is operated by NASA as part of the Tracking and Data Relay Satellite System. It was constructed by TRW as a replacement for TDRS-B, which had been lost in the Challenger accident, and was the last first generation TDRS satellite to be launched.

== History ==
TDRS-7 is based on a custom satellite bus which was used for all seven first generation TDRS satellites. Whilst similar to its predecessors, it differed from them slightly in that twelve G/H band (C band (IEEE)) transponders which had been included on the previous satellites were omitted. It was the last communications satellite, other than amateur radio spacecraft, to be deployed by a Space Shuttle.

=== Launch ===
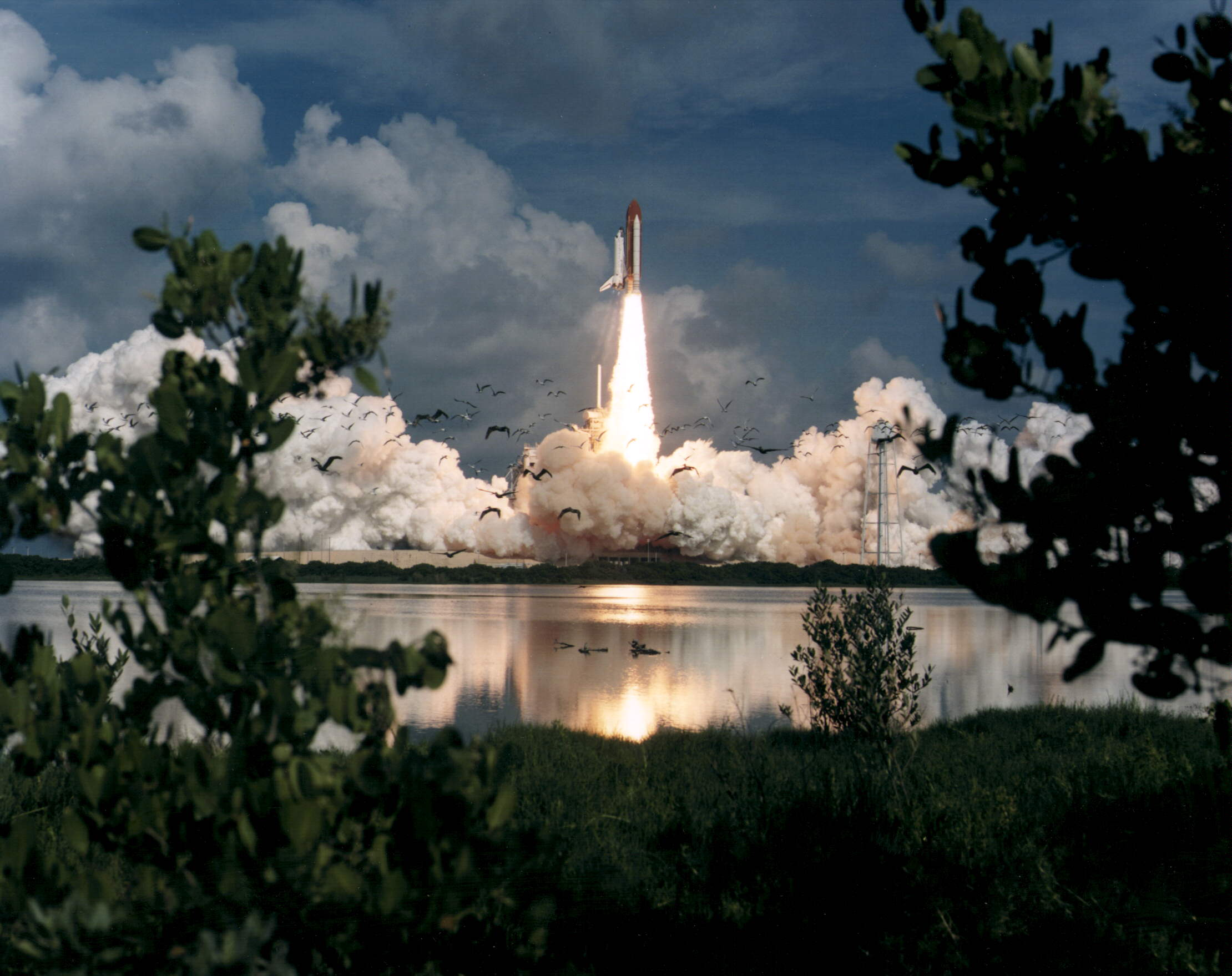
The launch of STS-70, carrying TDRS-G

The TDRS-G satellite was deployed from Space Shuttle Discovery during the STS-70 mission in 1995. Discovery was launched from Kennedy Space Center Launch Complex 39B at 13:41:55 UTC on 13 July 1995. TDRS-G was deployed from Discovery around six hours after launch, and was raised to geosynchronous orbit by means of an Inertial Upper Stage.

=== Deployment ===
The twin-stage solid-propellent Inertial Upper Stage made two burns. The first stage burn occurred around an hour after deployment from Discovery, and placed the satellite into a geosynchronous transfer orbit. At 02:30 UTC on 14 July 1995 it reached apogee, and the second stage fired, placing TDRS-G into geostationary orbit. At this point, it received its operational designation, TDRS-7. It was placed at a longitude 150.0° West of the Greenwich Meridian, where it underwent on-orbit testing. In May 1996, it was moved to 171.0° West where it was stored as an in-orbit spare, and subsequently entered service. In December 2003, it was relocated to 150.5° West. It arrived the next month, and was returned to storage as a reserve satellite.

Location of TDRS as of 26 May 2020

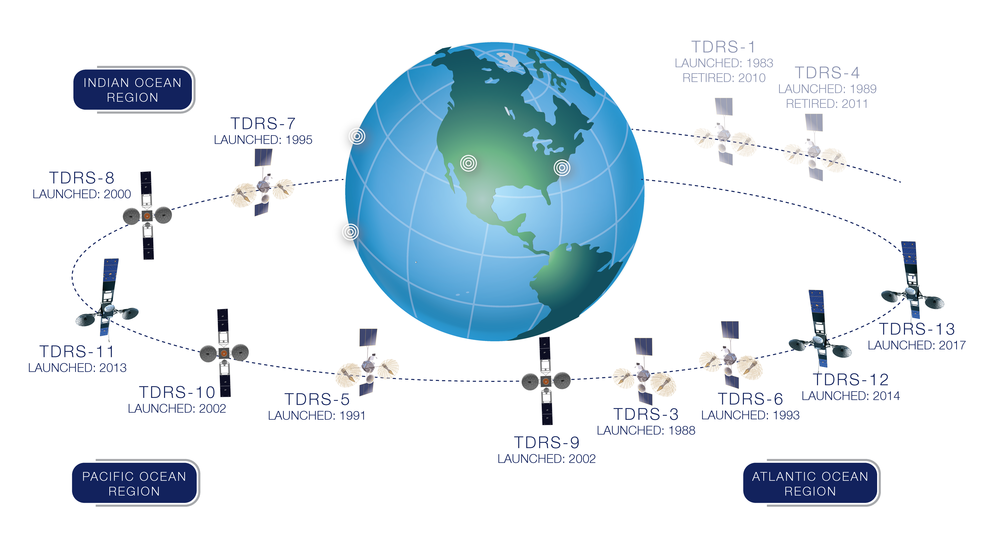
Location of TDRS as of 18 March 2019

== See also ==
- List of TDRS satellites
