= TDRS-B =

Destroyed American communications satellite

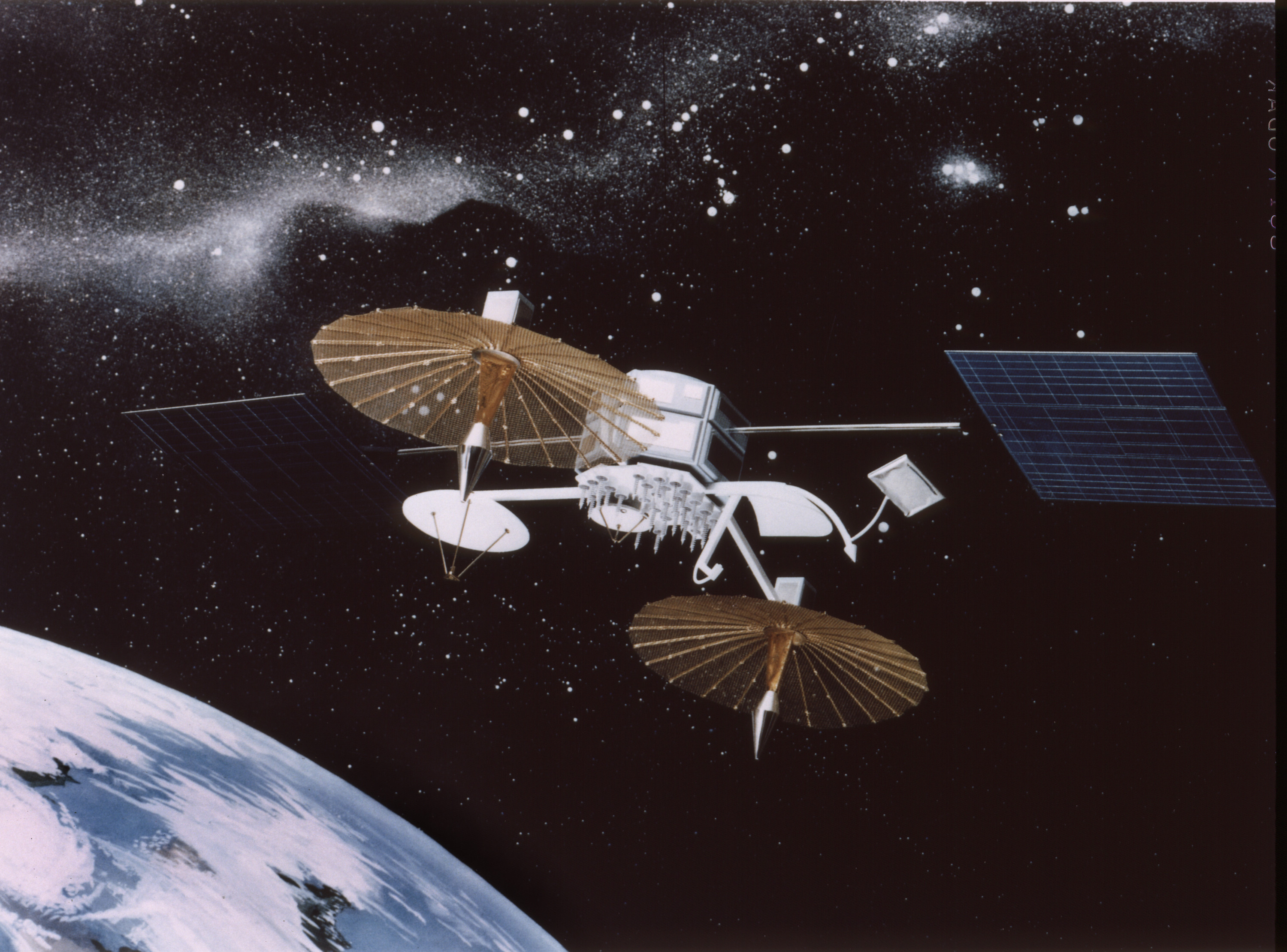
- Artist's impression of a TDRS satellite in orbit
- Mission type: Communications
- Operator: NASA
- COSPAR ID: TDRSS-B
- Mission duration: Planned: 10 years Final: 1 minute, 13 seconds Failed to orbit

Spacecraft properties
- Bus: TDRS
- Manufacturer: TRW
- Launch mass: 2,200 kg (4,850 lb)
- Dimensions: 17.4 × 12.9 m (57 × 42 ft)
- Power: 1700 watts

Start of mission
- Launch date: 28 January 1986, 16:38:00 UTC
- Rocket: Space Shuttle Challenger; STS-51-L / IUS
- Launch site: Kennedy LC-39B
- Contractor: Rockwell International

End of mission
- Destroyed: 28 January 1986, 16:39:13 UTC; Challenger disaster

Orbital parameters
- Reference system: Geocentric orbit
- Regime: Geostationary orbit
- Epoch: Planned

TDRS-B was an American communications satellite, of first generation, which was to have formed part of the Tracking and Data Relay Satellite System. It was destroyed in 1986 when the Space Shuttle Challenger disintegrated 73 seconds after launch.

== Launch ==
TDRS-B was launched in the payload bay of Challenger, attached to an Inertial Upper Stage (IUS). It was to have been deployed from the Shuttle in low Earth orbit. The IUS would have then performed two burns to raise the satellite into a geosynchronous orbit. On the previous TDRS launch, TDRS-1, the IUS second-stage motor malfunctioned following the first-stage burn, resulting in a loss of control, and delivery of the satellite into an incorrect orbit.

=== Launch failed ===
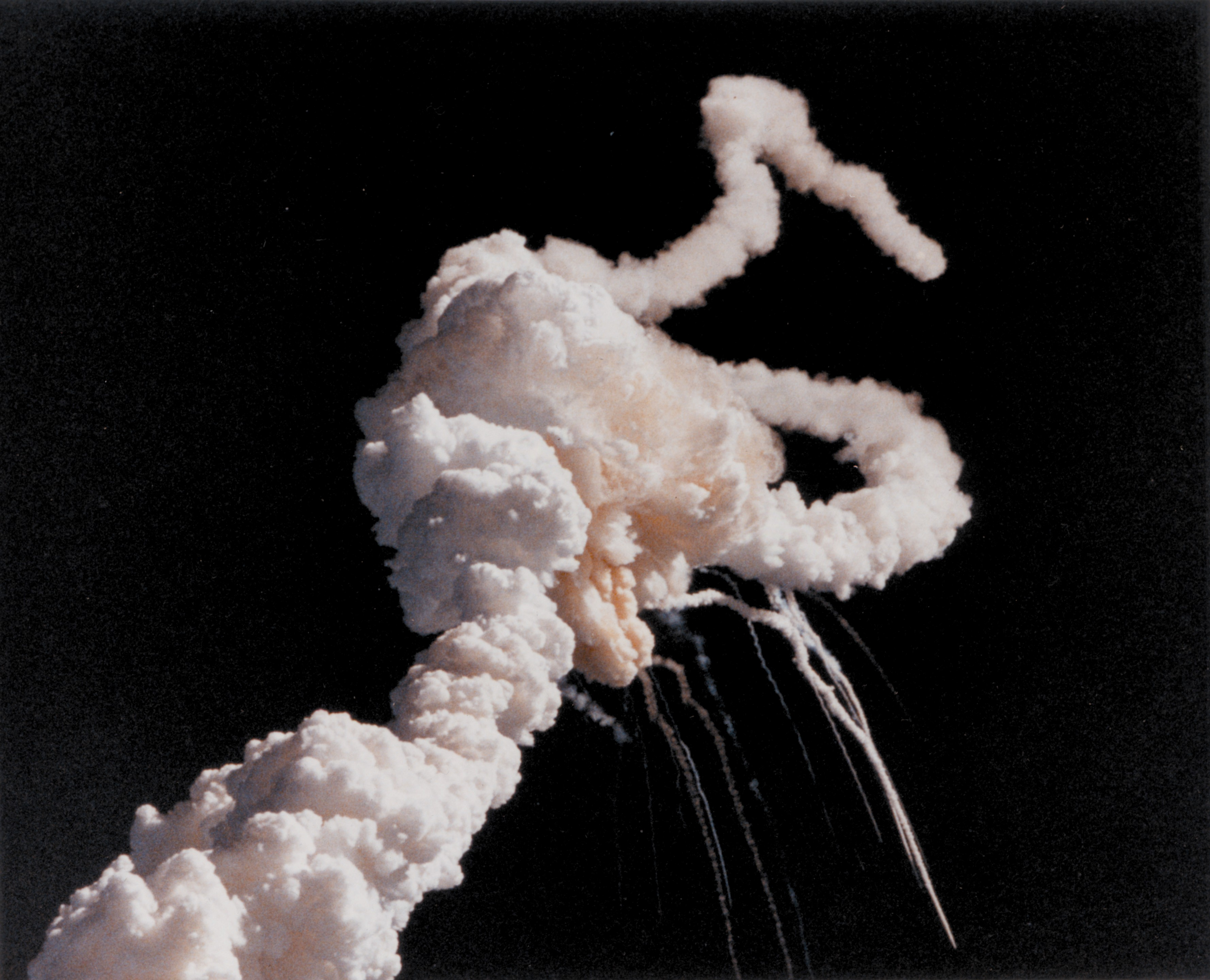
Challenger disintegrates 73 seconds after launch.

TDRS-B was originally scheduled for launch on STS-12 in March 1984; however, it was delayed and the flight cancelled following the IUS failure on TDRS-1. It was later re-manifested on STS-51-E; however, this too was cancelled due to concerns over the reliability of the IUS. It was eventually assigned to STS-51-L, which was also to carry the SPARTAN-Halley astronomy satellite.

STS-51-L launched with TDRS-B at 16:38:00 UTC on 28 January 1986. The Shuttle disintegrated 73 seconds after launch due to an O-ring failure in one of the Solid Rocket Boosters, killing the seven astronauts aboard and destroying TDRS-B.

=== Aftermath ===
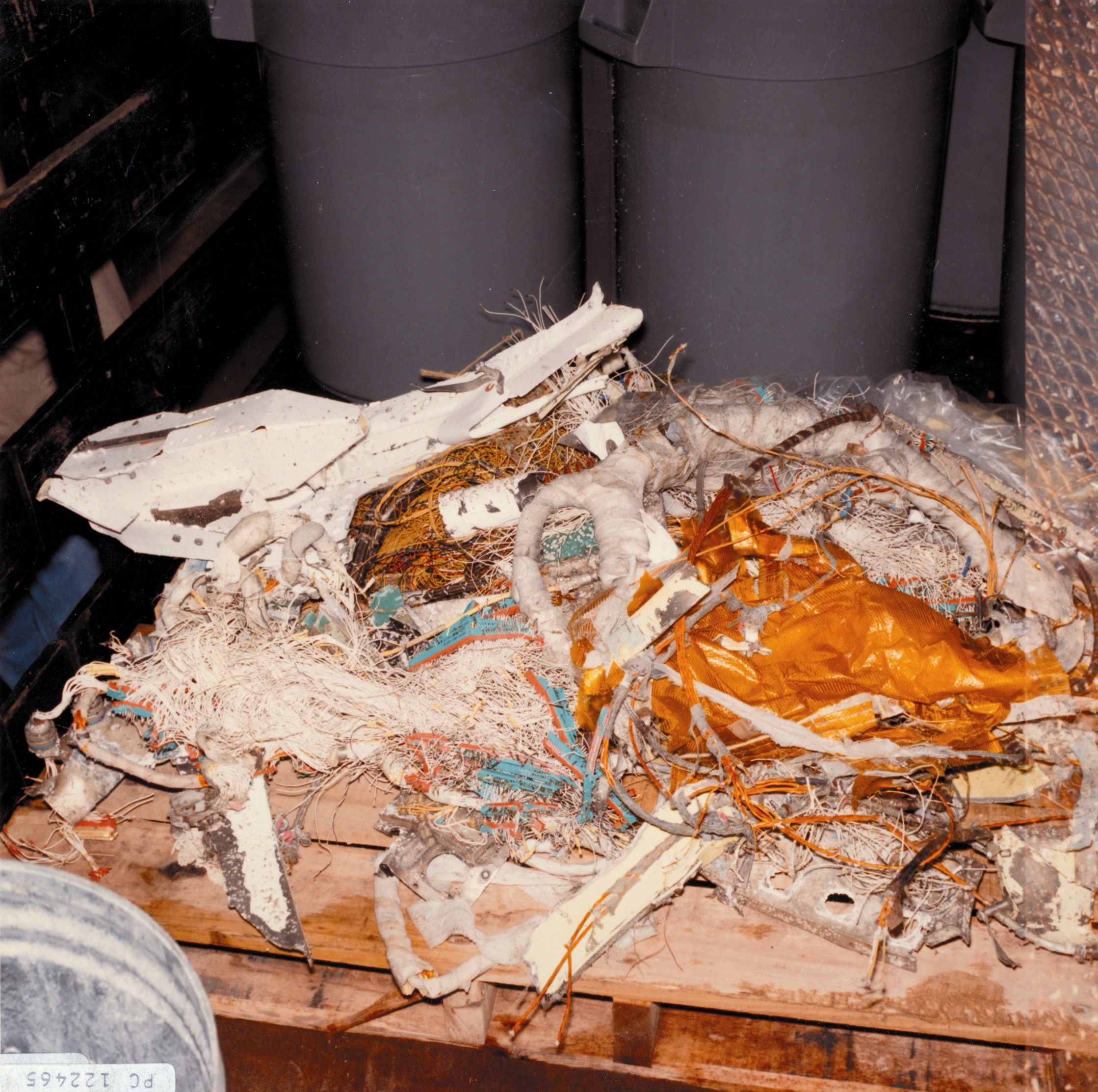
Debris from TDRS-B

Once it reached orbit, TDRS-B was to have been given the operational designation TDRS-2. Although normal practice was to reassign operational designations in the event of launch failures, the TDRS-2 designation was not reassigned, and when TDRS-C was launched, it became TDRS-3. Debris from TDRS-B was recovered along with the wreckage of Challenger, and was later buried with it at the silo of Cape Canaveral Launch Complex 31.

The TDRS-G satellite was ordered to replace TDRS-B. It was launched from Space Shuttle Discovery in 1995, on mission STS-70. It became TDRS-7 after reaching geosynchronous orbit.

== See also ==
- List of TDRS satellites
