= Titan IIIC =

Expendable launch system used by the US Air Force

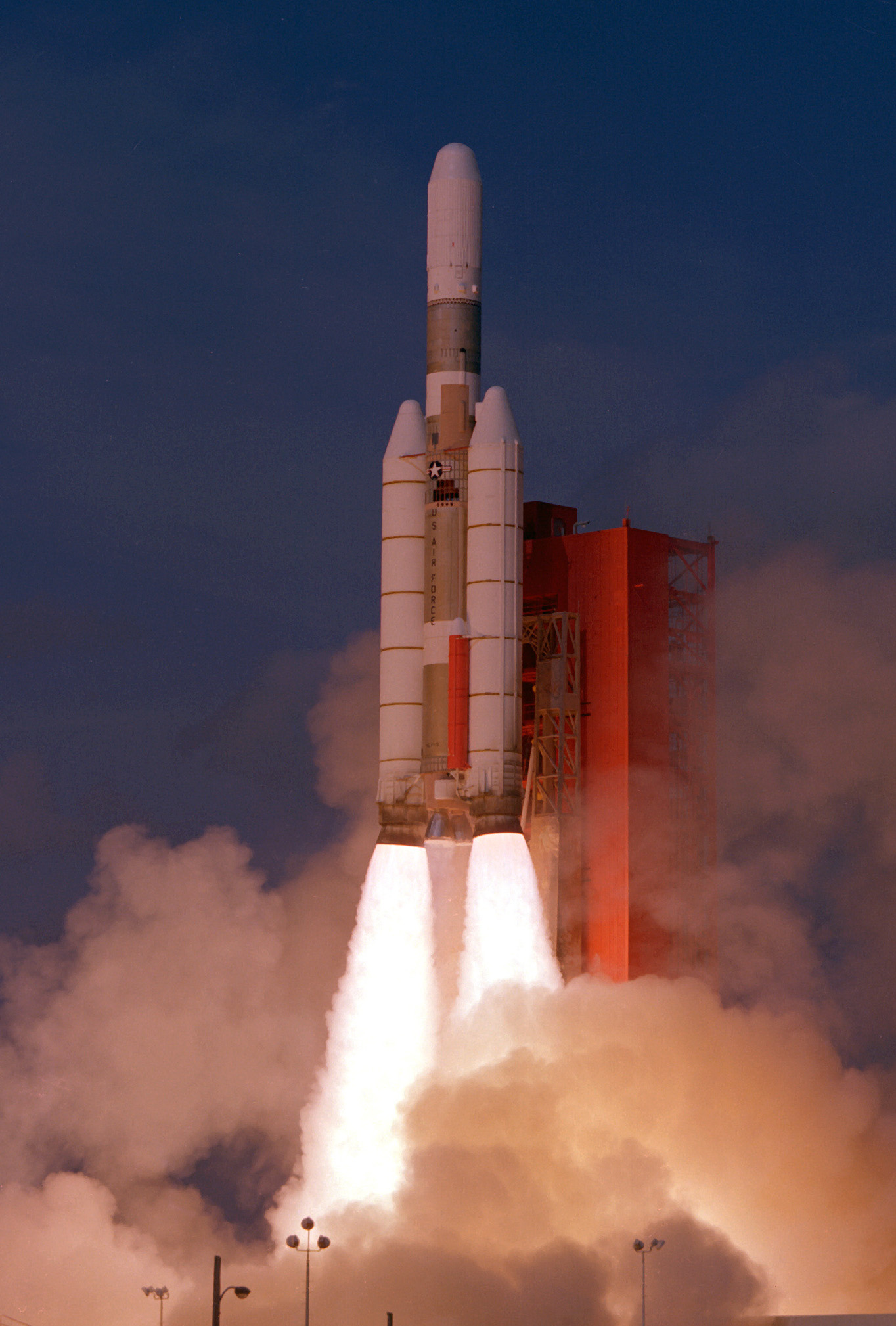
- Launch of a Titan IIIC
- Function: Medium-lift launch vehicle
- Manufacturer: Martin
- Country of origin: United States

Size
- Height: 137 ft (42 m)
- Diameter: 10 ft (3.0 m)
- Mass: 1,380,510 lb (626,190 kg)
- Stages: 2-3

Capacity

Payload to LEO
- Mass: 28,900 lb (13,100 kg)

Payload to GTO
- Mass: 6,600 lb (3,000 kg)

Payload to Mars
- Mass: 2,650 lb (1,200 kg)

Associated rockets
- Family: Titan

Launch history
- Status: Retired
- Launch sites: LC-40 & 41, CCAFS; SLC-6, Vandenberg AFB
- Total launches: 36
- Success(es): 31
- Failure: 5
- First flight: 18 June 1965
- Last flight: 6 March 1982

Boosters (Stage 0) – UA1205
- No. boosters: 2
- Maximum thrust: 1,315,000 lbf (5,850 kN)
- Specific impulse: 263 secs
- Burn time: 115 seconds
- Propellant: Solid

First stage
- Powered by: 1 LR87-AJ9
- Maximum thrust: 1,941.7 kN (436,500 lbf)
- Burn time: 147 seconds
- Propellant: N_{2}O_{4} / Aerozine 50

Second stage
- Powered by: 1 LR91-AJ9
- Maximum thrust: 453.1 kN (101,900 lbf)
- Burn time: 205 seconds
- Propellant: N_{2}O_{4} / Aerozine 50

Upper stage – Transtage
- Powered by: 2 AJ-10-138
- Maximum thrust: 16,000 lbf (71 kN)
- Burn time: 440 seconds
- Propellant: N_{2}O_{4} / Aerozine 50

The Titan IIIC was an expendable launch system used by the United States Air Force from 1965 until 1982. It was the first Titan booster to feature large solid rocket motors and was planned to be used as a launcher for the Dyna-Soar, though the spaceplane was cancelled before it could fly. The majority of the launcher's payloads were DoD satellites, for military communications and early warning, though one flight (ATS-6) was performed by NASA. The Titan IIIC was launched exclusively from Cape Canaveral while its sibling, the Titan IIID, was launched only from Vandenberg AFB.

== History ==
The Titan rocket family was established in October 1955 when the Air Force awarded the Glenn L. Martin Company (later Martin Marietta and now Lockheed Martin) a contract to build an intercontinental ballistic missile (SM-68). It became known as the Titan I, the nation's first two-stage ICBM, and replaced the Atlas ICBM as the second underground, vertically stored, silo-based ICBM. Both stages of the Titan I used kerosene (RP-1) and liquid oxygen (LOX) as propellants. A subsequent version of the Titan family, the Titan II, was similar to the Titan I, but was much more powerful. Designated as LGM-25C, the Titan II was the largest USAF missile at the time and burned Aerozine 50 and nitrogen tetroxide (NTO) rather than RP-1 and LOX.

The Titan III family consisted of an enhanced Titan II core with or without solid rocket strap-on boosters and an assortment of upper stages. All Solid Rocket Motor SRM-equipped Titans (IIIC, IIID, IIIE, 34D, and IV) launched with only the SRMs firing at liftoff, the core stage not activating until T+105 seconds, shortly before SRM jettison. The Titan IIIA (an early test variant flown in 1964–65) and IIIB (flown from 1966 to 1987 with an Agena D upper stage in both standard and extended tank variants) had no SRMs. The Titan III launchers provided assured capability and flexibility for launch of large-class payloads.

All Titan II/III/IV vehicles contained a special range safety system known as the Inadvertent Separation Destruction System (ISDS) that would activate and destroy the first stage if there was a premature second stage separation. Titans that carried Solid Rocket Boosters (SRBs) (Titan IIIC, IIID, 34D, and IV) had a second ISDS that consisted of several lanyards attached to the SRBs that would trigger and automatically destroy them if they prematurely separated from the core, said "destruction" consisting mainly of splitting the casings open to release the pressure inside and terminate thrust. The ISDS would end up being used a few times over the Titan's career.

Another slight modification to SRB-equipped Titans was the first stage engines being covered instead of the open truss structure on the Titan II/IIIA/IIIB. This was to protect the engines from the heat of the SRB exhaust.

Titan III/IV SRBs were fixed nozzle and for roll control, a small tank of nitrogen tetroxide was mounted to each motor. The N_{2}O_{4} would be injected into the SRB exhaust to deflect it in the desired direction.

As the IIIC consisted of mostly proven hardware, launch problems were generally only caused by the upper stages and/or payload.

=== Launch history ===
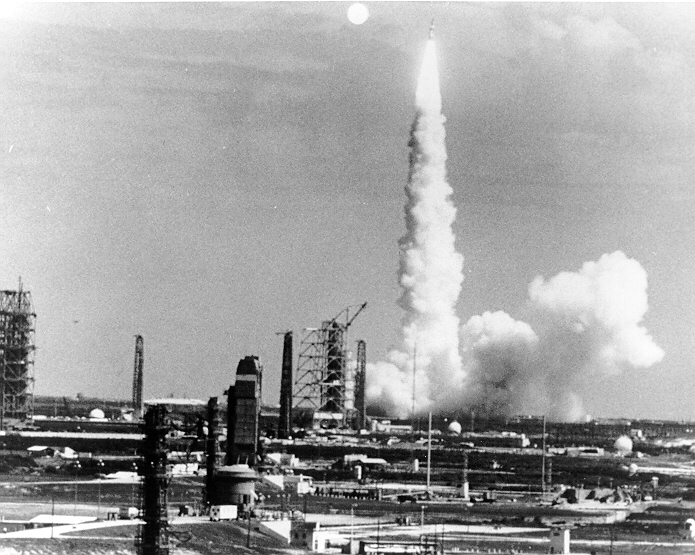
First Titan IIIC rocket with technological stage Transtage 4, June 18 1965.

The first Titan IIIC (3C-7) flew on June 18, 1965, and was the most powerful launcher used by the Air Force until it was replaced by the Titan 34D in 1982.

The second launch (3C-4) in October 1965 failed, when the Transtage suffered an oxidizer leak and was unable to put its payload (several small satellites) into the correct orbit. The third launch (3C-8) in December experienced a similar failure.

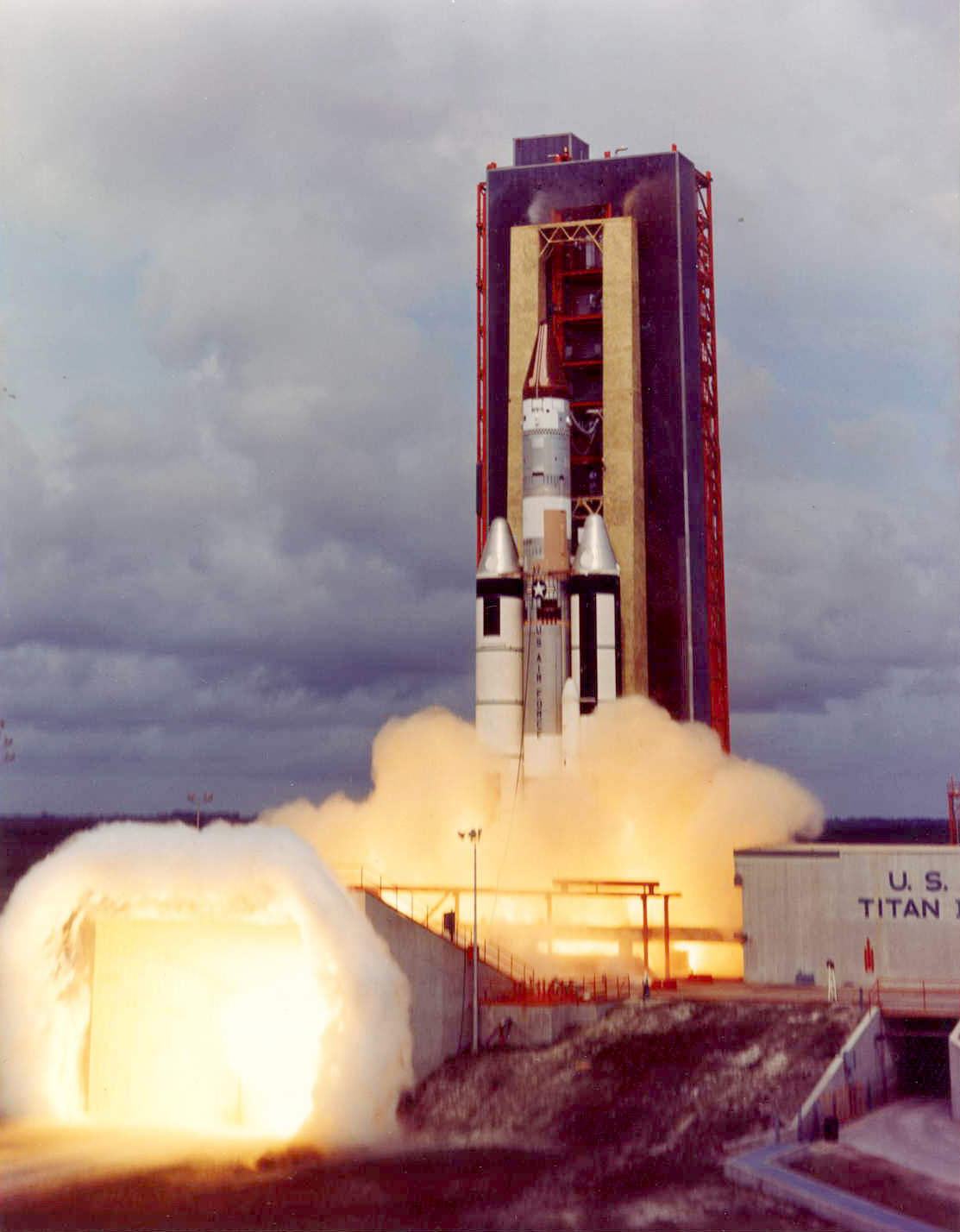
Titan IIIC-11 launch 16 June 1966 carrying first seven Initial Defense Communications Satellite Program satellites and GGTS

The fourth IIIC launch (3C-11 on June 16, 1966) was used to send the LES 4 (Lincoln Experimental Satellite 4) into orbit. It was a US Air Force experimental communications satellite launched along with OV2-3, LES 3, and Oscar 4 from Cape Canaveral aboard a single Titan 3C rocket. It transmitted in X-band.

The fifth Titan IIIC (3C-12 on August 26, 1966) failed shortly after launch when pieces of the payload fairing started breaking off. Around 80 seconds, the remainder of the shroud disintegrated, causing loss of launch vehicle control as well as the payload (a group of IDCSP satellites intended to provide radio communication for the US Army in Vietnam). The Titan performed a cartwheel, causing SRM #1 to break off the stack, activating its ISDS system and blowing up the entire launch vehicle. The exact reason for the shroud failure was not determined, but the fiberglass payload shrouds used on the Titan III up to this point were replaced with a metal shroud afterwards.

A Titan IIIC in November 1970 (3C-19) failed to place its missile early warning satellite (DSP 1) in the correct orbit due to a Transtage guidance problem and a 1975 launch (3C-25) of two DSCS II (DSCS-2 5 and DSCS-2 6) military communication satellites left in LEO by a Transtage power failure.

On March 25, 1978, a launch of two DSCS II satellites (3C-35 with DSCS-2 9 and DSCS-2 10) performed normally through stage 1 powered flight and part of stage 2 flight. At T+425 seconds, a hydraulic line ruptured from overpressurization caused by a malfunction of the hydraulic pump, causing immediate loss of system pressure. Engine gimbaling control was lost and the Titan began tumbling. The guidance system sensed negative acceleration and sent an automatic shutdown command to the engine. The Range Safety destruct command was sent at T+630 seconds, sending the DSCS satellites into the Atlantic Ocean.

The last IIIC (3C-38 with DSP 10) was launched in March 1982.

== Design ==
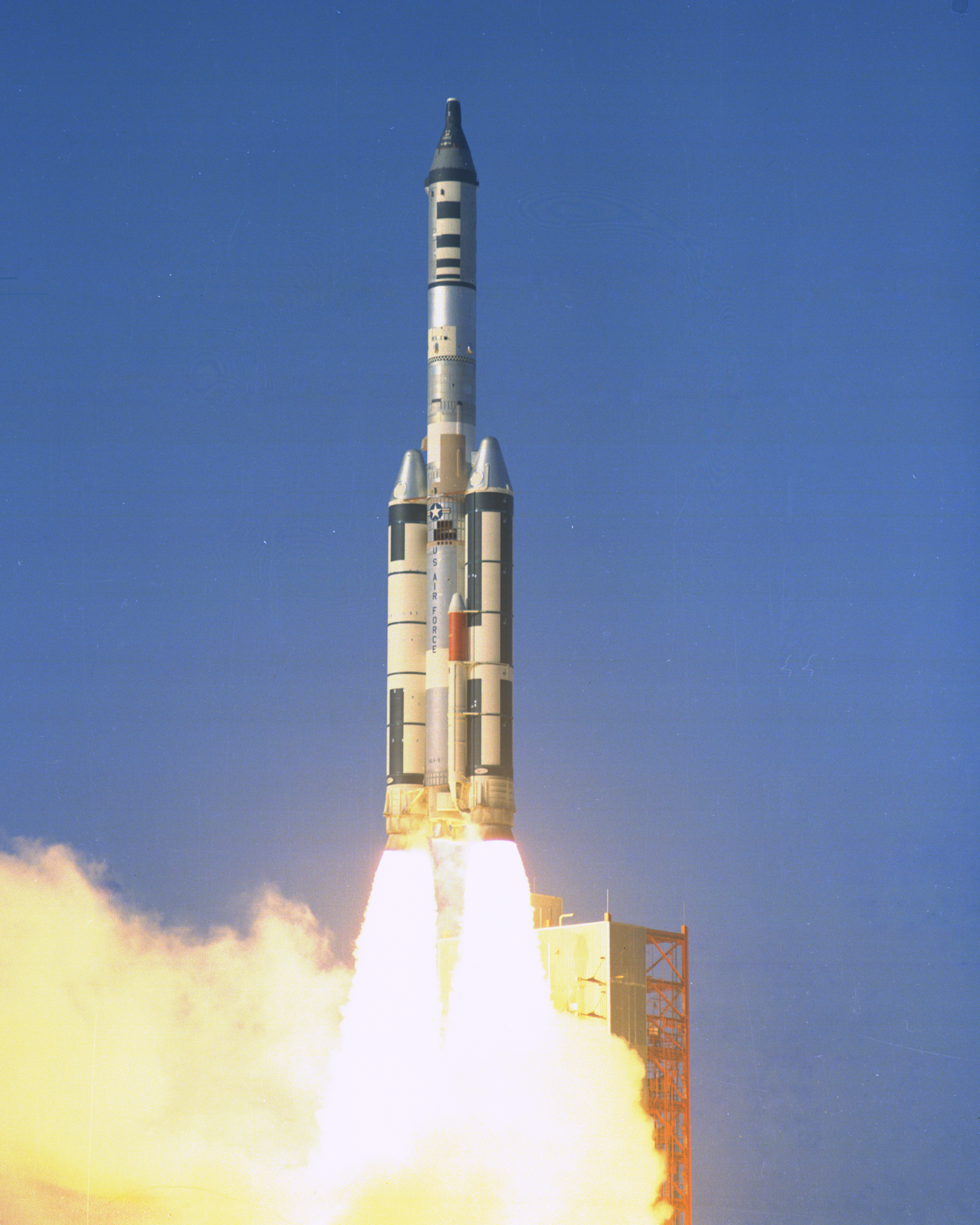
MOL mockup launch by a Titan IIIC on Nov. 3, 1966 from LC-41 Cape Canaveral

The Titan IIIC weighed about 1,380,000 lb (626,000 kg) at liftoff and consisted of a two-stage Titan core and upper stage called the Titan Transtage, both burning hypergolic liquid fuel, and two large UA1205 solid rocket motors.

The solid motors were ignited on the ground and were designated "stage 0". Each motor composed of five segments and was 10 ft (3.0 m) in diameter, 85 ft (26 m) long, and weighed nearly 500,000 lb (230,000 kg). They produced a combined 2,380,000 lbf (10,600 kN) thrust at sea level and burned for approximately 115 seconds. Solid motor jettison occurred at approximately 116 seconds.

The first core stage ignited about 5 seconds before SRM jettison. Designated the Titan 3A-1, this stage was powered by a twin nozzle Aerojet LR-87-AJ9 engine that burned about 240,000 lb (110,000 kg) of Aerozine 50 and nitrogen tetroxide (NTO) and produced 1,941.7 kN (436,500 lbf) thrust over 147 seconds. The Aerozine 50 and NTO were stored in structurally independent tanks to minimize the hazard of the two mixing if a leak should have developed in either tank.

The second core stage, the Titan 3A-2, contained about 55,000 lb (25,000 kg) of propellant and was powered by a single Aerojet LR-91-AJ9, which produced 453.7 kN (102,000 lbf) for 145 seconds.

The upper stage, the Titan Transtage, also burned Aerozine 50 and NTO. Its two Aerojet AJ-10-138 engines were restartable, allowing flexible orbital operations including orbital trimming, geostationary transfer and insertion, and delivery of multiple payloads to different orbits. This required complex guidance and instrumentation. Transtage contained about 22,000 lb (10,000 kg) of propellant and its engines delivered 16,000 lbf (71 kN).

=== Titan-3(23)C ===
The Titan-3(23)C variation introduced in late 1970 uses different versions of the engines for the first and second stages:

- First stage: twin nozzle Aerojet LR-87-AJ11
- Second stage: single Aerojet LR-91-AJ11

This configuration was used for 23 launches.

== General characteristics ==
- Primary Function: Space booster
- Builder: Martin Marietta
- Power Plant:
  - Stage 0 consists of two solid rocket motors.
  - Stage 1 uses two LR87 liquid propellant engines.
  - Stage 2 uses one LR91 liquid propellant engine.
  - Stage 3 uses two Aerojet AJ-10-138 liquid propellant engines.
- Length: 42 m
  - Stage 0: 25.91 m
  - Stage 1: 22.28 m
  - Stage 2: 7.9 m
  - Stage 3: 4.57 m
- Diameter:
  - Stage 0: 3.05 m
  - Stage 1: 3.05 m
  - Stage 2: 3.05 m
  - Stage 3: 3.05 m
- Mass:
  - Stage 0: Empty 33,798 kg/ea; Full 226,233 kg/ea
  - Stage 1: Empty 5,443 kg; Full 116,573 kg
  - Stage 2: Empty 2,653 kg; Full 29,188 kg
  - Stage 3: Empty 1,950 kg; Full 12,247 kg
- Lift capability:
  - Up to 28,900 lb (13,100 kg) into a low Earth orbit with 28 degrees inclination.
  - Up to 6,600 lb (3,000 kg) into a geosynchronous transfer orbit when launched from Cape Canaveral Air Force Station, FL.
- Maximum takeoff weight: 626,190 kg
- Cost:
- Date deployed: June 1965.
- Launch sites: Cape Canaveral Air Force Station, FL., and Vandenberg Air Force Base, CA.

== List of launches ==
Date/Time (GMT)	Launch site	S/N	Version	Payload	Outcome	Remarks
18 June 1965; 14:00	CCAFS LC-40	3C-7	Titan IIIC	N/A	Success	Transtage test flight
14 October 1965; 17:24	CCAFS LC-40	3C-4	Titan IIIC	LCS-2; OV2-1	Failure	Transtage failed in low Earth orbit due to oxidizer tank leak
21 December 1965; 14:00	CCAFS LC-41	3C-8	Titan IIIC	LES-3; LES-4; OV2-3; OSCAR 4	Partial failure	Transtage failed during 3rd burn due to stuck oxidizer valve; left payloads in GTO
16 June 1966; 14:00	CCAFS LC-41	3C-11	Titan IIIC	OPS-9311 (IDCSP); OPS-9312 (IDCSP); OPS-9313 (IDCSP); OPS-9314 (IDCSP); OPS-9315 (IDCSP); OPS-9316 (IDCSP); OPS-9317 (IDCSP); GGTS-1	Success	
26 August 1966; 14:00	CCAFS LC-41	3C-12	Titan IIIC	7X IDCSP; GGTS-2	Failure	Payload fairing broke up at T+78 seconds. RSO T+83 seconds.
3 November 1966; 13:50	CCAFS LC-40	3C-9	Titan IIIC	Gemini B OV1-6; OV4-1R/T; OV4-3	Success	Gemini B was launched on a sub-orbital trajectory
18 January 1967; 14:19	CCAFS LC-41	3C-13	Titan IIIC	OPS-9321 (IDCSP); OPS-9322 (IDCSP); OPS-9323 (IDCSP); OPS-9324 (IDCSP); OPS-9325 (IDCSP); OPS-9326 (IDCSP); OPS-9327 (IDCSP); OPS-9328 (IDCSP)	Success	
28 April 1967; 10:01	CCAFS LC-41	3C-10	Titan IIIC	OPS-6638 (Vela); OPS-6679 (Vela); ORS-4; OV5-1; OV5-3	Success	
1 July 1967; 13:15	CCAFS LC-41	3C-14	Titan IIIC	OPS-9331 (IDCSP); OPS-9332 (IDCSP); OPS-9333 (IDCSP); OPS-9334 (IDCSP); LES-5; DODGE	Success	
13 June 1968; 14:03	CCAFS LC-41	3C-16	Titan IIIC	OPS-9341 (IDCSP); OPS-9342 (IDCSP); OPS-9343 (IDCSP); OPS-9344 (IDCSP); OPS-9345 (IDCSP); OPS-9346 (IDCSP); OPS-9347 (IDCSP); OPS-9348 (IDCSP)	Success	
26 September 1968; 07:37	CCAFS LC-41	3C-5	Titan IIIC	LES-6; OV2-5; OV5-2; OV5-4	Success	
9 February 1969; 21:09	CCAFS LC-41	3C-17	Titan IIIC	TACOMSAT (OPS-0757)	Success	
23 May 1969; 07:57	CCAFS LC-41	3C-15	Titan IIIC	OPS-6909 (Vela); OPS-6911 (Vela); OV5-5; OV5-6; OV5-9	Success	
8 April 1970; 10:50	CCAFS LC-40	3C-18	Titan IIIC	OPS-7033 (Vela); OPS-7044 (Vela)	Success	
6 November 1970; 10:36	CCAFS LC-40	3C-19	Titan-3(23)C	DSP-1 (OPS-5960)	Partial failure	Transtage 3rd burn failure left satellite in unusable lower than planned orbit
5 May 1971; 07:43	CCAFS LC-40	3C-20	Titan-3(23)C	DSP-2 (OPS-3811)	Success	
3 November 1971; 03:09	CCAFS LC-40	3C-21	Titan-3(23)C	DSCS-II-1 (OPS-9431); DSCS-II-2 (OPS-9432)	Success	
1 March 1972; 09:39	CCAFS LC-40	3C-22	Titan-3(23)C	DSP-3 (OPS-1570)	Success	
12 June 1973; 07:14	CCAFS LC-40	3C-24	Titan-3(23)C	DSP-4 (OPS-6157)	Success	
13 December 1973; 23:57	CCAFS LC-40	3C-26	Titan-3(23)C	DSCS-II-3 (OPS-9433); DSCS-II-4 (OPS-9434)	Success	
30 May 1974; 13:00	CCAFS LC-40	3C-27	Titan-3(23)C	ATS-6	Success	
20 May 1975; 14:03	CCAFS LC-40	3C-25	Titan-3(23)C	DSCS-II-5 (OPS-9435); DSCS-II-6 (OPS-9436)	Failure	Transtage inertial measurement unit failure caused it to be stranded in low Earth orbit.
14 December 1975; 05:15	CCAFS LC-40	3C-29	Titan-3(23)C	DSP-5 (OPS-3165)	Success	
15 March 1976; 01:25	CCAFS LC-40	3C-30	Titan-3(23)C	LES-8; LES-9; Solrad-11A; Solrad-11B	Success	
26 June 1976; 03:00	CCAFS LC-40	3C-28	Titan-3(23)C	DSP-6 (OPS-2112)	Success	
6 February 1977; 06:00	CCAFS LC-40	3C-23	Titan-3(23)C	DSP-7 (OPS-3151)	Success	
12 May 1977; 14:27	CCAFS LC-40	3C-32	Titan-3(23)C	DSCS-II-7 (OPS-9437); DSCS-II-8 (OPS-9438)	Success	
25 March 1978; 18:09	CCAFS LC-40	3C-35	Titan-3(23)C	DSCS-II-9 (OPS-9439); DSCS-II-10 (OPS-9440)	Failure	Second stage hydraulics pump failure. RSO T+480 seconds.
10 June 1978; 19:08	CCAFS LC-40	3C-33	Titan-3(23)C	OPS-9454 (Vortex)	Success	
14 December 1978; 00:40	CCAFS LC-40	3C-36	Titan-3(23)C	DSCS-II-11 (OPS-9441); DSCS-II-12 (OPS-9442)	Success	
10 June 1979; 13:30	CCAFS LC-40	3C-31	Titan-3(23)C	DSP-8 (OPS-7484)	Success	
1 October 1979; 11:22	CCAFS LC-40	3C-34	Titan-3(23)C	OPS-1948 (Vortex)	Success	
21 November 1979; 02:09	CCAFS LC-40	3C-37	Titan-3(23)C	DSCS-II-13 (OPS-9443); DSCS-II-14 (OPS-9444)	Success	
16 March 1981; 13:30	CCAFS LC-40	3C-40	Titan-3(23)C	DSP-9 (OPS-7350)	Success	
31 October 1981; 09:22	CCAFS LC-40	3C-39	Titan-3(23)C	OPS-4029 (Vortex)	Success	
6 March 1982; 19:25	CCAFS LC-40	3C-38	Titan-3(23)C	DSP-10 (OPS-8701)	Success	
