= Titan IIID =

Expendable launch system used by the National Reconnaissance Office

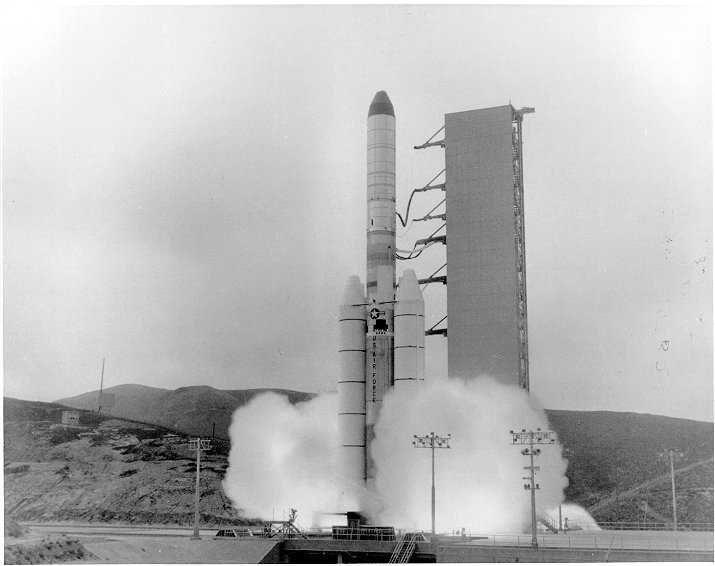
- Launch of a Titan IIID
- Function: Expendable launch system
- Manufacturer: Martin Marietta
- Country of origin: United States

Size
- Height: 36 m (118 ft)
- Diameter: 3.05 m (10.0 ft)
- Mass: 612,990 kg (1,351,410 lb)
- Stages: Two

Capacity

Payload to LEO
- Mass: 12,300 kg (27,100 lb)

Associated rockets
- Family: Titan

Launch history
- Status: Retired
- Launch sites: SLC-4E, Vandenberg AFB
- Total launches: 22
- Success(es): 22
- First flight: 15 June 1971
- Last flight: 17 November 1982

Boosters (Stage 0) – UA1205
- No. boosters: Two
- Powered by: off
- Maximum thrust: 5,849 kN (1,315,000 lb_{f})
- Specific impulse: 263 sec
- Burn time: 115 seconds
- Propellant: Solid

First stage
- Powered by: 2 LR87-11
- Maximum thrust: 2,340 kN (530,000 lb_{f})
- Specific impulse: 302 sec
- Burn time: 147 seconds
- Propellant: N_{2}O_{4} / Aerozine 50

Second stage
- Powered by: 1 LR91-11
- Maximum thrust: 454 kN (102,000 lb_{f})
- Specific impulse: 316 sec
- Burn time: 205 seconds
- Propellant: N_{2}O_{4} / Aerozine 50

The Titan IIID or Titan 3D was an American expendable launch system, part of the Titan rocket family. Titan IIID was flown 22 times with KH-9 and KH-11 satellites between 1971 and 1982, all successful launches. Essentially a Titan IIIC with the Transtage removed, it was designed for heavy LEO payloads.

The rocket had two UA1205 solid fuel boosters, the first stage was equipped with two LR-87-AJ11 engines and the second stage had a single LR-91-AJ11 engine.

Part of the Titan rocket family, the Titan IIID first flew on 15 June 1971, launching the first KH-9 satellite. It was retired from service in 1982, and replaced by the uprated Titan 34D. All launches occurred from Space Launch Complex 4E at Vandenberg Air Force Base.

== Launch history ==
Date/Time (GMT)	Launch site	S/N	Payload	Outcome	Remarks
15 June 1971; 18:41	VAFB LC-4E	3D-1	OPS-8709 (KH-9)	Success	
20 January 1972; 18:36	VAFB LC-4E	3D-2	OPS-1737 (KH-9)	Success	
7 July 1972; 17:46	VAFB LC-4E	3D-5	OPS-7293 (KH-9)	Success	
10 October 1972; 18:03	VAFB LC-4E	3D-3	OPS-8314 (KH-9)	Success	
9 March 1973; 21:00	VAFB LC-4E	3D-6	OPS-8410 (KH-9)	Success	
13 July 1973; 20:22	VAFB LC-4E	3D-7	OPS-8261 (KH-9)	Success	
10 November 1973; 20:12	VAFB LC-4E	3D-8	OPS-6630 (KH-9)	Success	
10 April 1974; 20:20	VAFB LC-4E	3D-9	OPS-6245 (KH-9)	Success	
29 October 1974; 19:30	VAFB LC-4E	3D-4	OPS-7122 (KH-9)	Success	
8 June 1975; 18:30	VAFB LC-4E	3D-10	OPS-6381 (KH-9)	Success	
4 December 1975; 20:30	VAFB LC-4E	3D-13	OPS-5547 (KH-9)	Success	
8 July 1976; 18:30	VAFB LC-4E	3D-14	OPS-4699 (KH-9)	Success	
19 December 1976; 18:19	VAFB LC-4E	3D-15	OPS-5705 (KH-11)	Success	
27 June 1977; 18:30	VAFB LC-4E	3D-17	OPS-4800 (KH-9)	Success	
26 March 1978; 18:40	VAFB LC-4E	3D-20	OPS-0460 (KH-9)	Success	
14 June 1978; 18:23	VAFB LC-4E	3D-18	OPS-4515 (KH-11)	Success	
16 March 1979; 18:30	VAFB LC-4E	3D-21	OPS-3854 (KH-9)	Success	
7 February 1980; 21:10	VAFB LC-4E	3D-19	OPS-2581 (KH-11)	Success	
18 June 1980; 18:30	VAFB LC-4E	3D-16	OPS-3123 (KH-9)	Success	
3 September 1981; 18:29	VAFB LC-4E	3D-22	OPS-3984 (KH-11)	Success	
11 May 1982; 18:35	VAFB LC-4E	3D-24	OPS-5642 (KH-9)	Success	
17 November 1982; 21:18	VAFB LC-4E	3D-23	OPS-9627 (KH-11)	Success	
