= Titan IIIM =

Planned American expendable launch vehicle

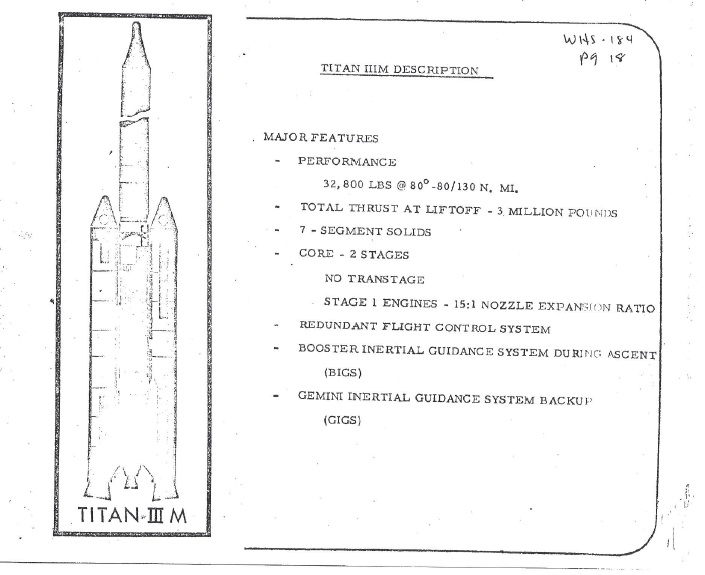
- Titan IIIM proposal
- Function: Expendable launch system
- Manufacturer: Martin Marietta
- Country of origin: United States
- Cost per launch: US$22 million (1965)

Size
- Height: 39.0 m (128.0 ft)
- Diameter: 3.05 m (10.0 ft)
- Mass: 836,560 kg (1,844,300 lb)
- Stages: 2

Capacity

Payload to 185 km (115 mi)
- Mass: 17,000 kg (37,000 lb)

Associated rockets
- Family: Titan

Launch history
- Status: Cancelled
- Launch sites: CCAFS LC-40; Vandenberg AFB SLC-6
- Total launches: 0

Boosters – UA1207
- No. boosters: 2
- Height: 34.14 m (112.0 ft)
- Diameter: 3.05 m (10.0 ft)
- Empty mass: 51,230 kg (112,940 lb)
- Gross mass: 319,330 kg (704,000 lb)
- Maximum thrust: 7,116.999 kN (1,599,965 lb_{f})
- Specific impulse: 272 s (2.67 km/s)
- Burn time: 120 s
- Propellant: Solid

First stage – Titan IIIB-1
- Height: 23.99 m (78.7 ft)
- Diameter: 3.05 m (10.0 ft)
- Empty mass: 7,000 kg (15,400 lb)
- Gross mass: 139,935 kg (308,504 lb)
- Powered by: 2 × LR87-11
- Maximum thrust: 2,413.191 kN (542,507 lb_{f})
- Specific impulse: 302 s (2.96 km/s)
- Burn time: 161 s
- Propellant: A-50 / N_{2}O_{4}

Second stage – Titan IIIB-2
- Height: 8.6 m (28.2 ft)
- Diameter: 3.05 m (10.0 ft)
- Empty mass: 2,900 kg (6,400 lb)
- Gross mass: 37,560 kg (82,810 lb)
- Powered by: 1 × LR91-11
- Maximum thrust: 460.314 kN (103,483 lb_{f})
- Specific impulse: 316 s (3.10 km/s)
- Burn time: 230 s
- Propellant: A-50 / N_{2}O_{4}

The Titan IIIM was a planned American expendable launch system, intended to launch the Manned Orbiting Laboratory and other payloads. Development was cancelled in 1969. The stretched core stage was used on some versions of the Titan IIIB and the projected UA1207 solid booster rockets were eventually used on the Titan IV.

== Development ==
- 1969 April 27 - First static test firing of Titan IIIM seven segment solid rocket booster motor. Firing took place at the United Technologies Coyote Canyon test site at the southern edge of San Jose, California, and generated 700,000 kgf (6,900,000 N; 1,500,000 lbf) for two minutes.

== Planned flights ==
- 1970 - Uncrewed Gemini-B/Titan IIIM qualification flight
- 1971 - Uncrewed Gemini-B/Titan IIIM qualification flight
