= Vortex (satellite) =

Class of spy satellite operated by the United States

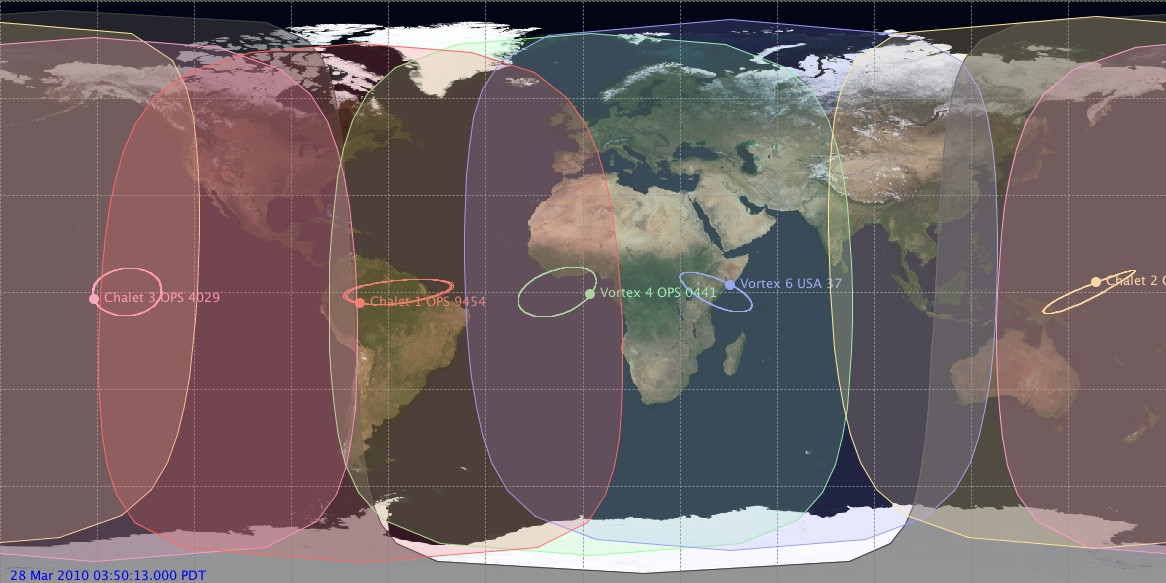
- Vortex satellite footprints
- Country of origin: United States
- Operator: National Reconnaissance Office; United States Air Force
- Applications: Espionage

Specifications
- Launch mass: 1,800 kilograms (4,000 lb)
- Regime: Non-stationary geosynchronous orbit

Production
- Built: 6
- Launched: 6
- Failed: 0
- Maiden launch: 10 June 1978, 19:08 UTC
- Last launch: 10 May 1989, 19:47:01 UTC

Vortex, previously known as Chalet, was a class of spy satellite operated by the United States during the 1980s and 1990s to collect signals intelligence (SIGINT) from high Earth orbit. The Vortex satellites were operated by the National Reconnaissance Office for the United States Air Force and listened to radio transmissions originating from Earth or space. The intercepted data is believed to have been fed into and analyzed by the National Security Agency ECHELON system.

The satellites each had a mass of approximately 1,800 kilograms and are operated from non-stationary geosynchronous orbits. Each reportedly carried a 38-meter-diameter umbrella-like reflecting dish to collect radio signals from Earth. At least six launch attempts were made of Chalet/Vortex satellites between 1978 and 1989. The Chalet/Vortex satellites replaced the older generation of Canyon satellites, and were superseded by the larger, more capable Mercury satellites.

== Launches ==
Name	COSPAR ID SATCAT No.	Launch date (UTC)	Launch vehicle	Launch site	Orbit	Remarks
OPS 9454	1978-058A; 10941	10 June 1978; 19:08	Titan III(23)C	CCAFS LC-40		
OPS 1948	1979-086A; 11558	1 October 1979; 11:22:00	Titan III(23)C	CCAFS LC-40		
OPS 4029	1981-107A; 12930	31 October 1981; 09:22:00	Titan III(23)C	CCAFS LC-40		
OPS 0441	1984-009A; 14675	31 January 1984; 03:08:01	Titan III(34)D/Transtage*	CCAFS LC-40		
USA-31	1988-077A; 19458	2 September 1988; 12:05:02	Titan III(34)D/Transtage	CCAFS LC-40		
USA-37	1989-035A; 19976	10 May 1989; 19:47:01	Titan III(34)D/Transtage	CCAFS LC-40		

* – The rockets used for the first three launches also included Transtages, however it was considered an integral component of the Titan III(23)C rocket, and an additional upper stage for Titan III(34)D launches.

== See also ==
- Magnum SIGINT satellites – a similar, contemporary program run for the Central Intelligence Agency
- Mercury or "Advanced Vortex" SIGINT satellites – replacements for Vortex
