= Titan 34D =

American expendable rocket

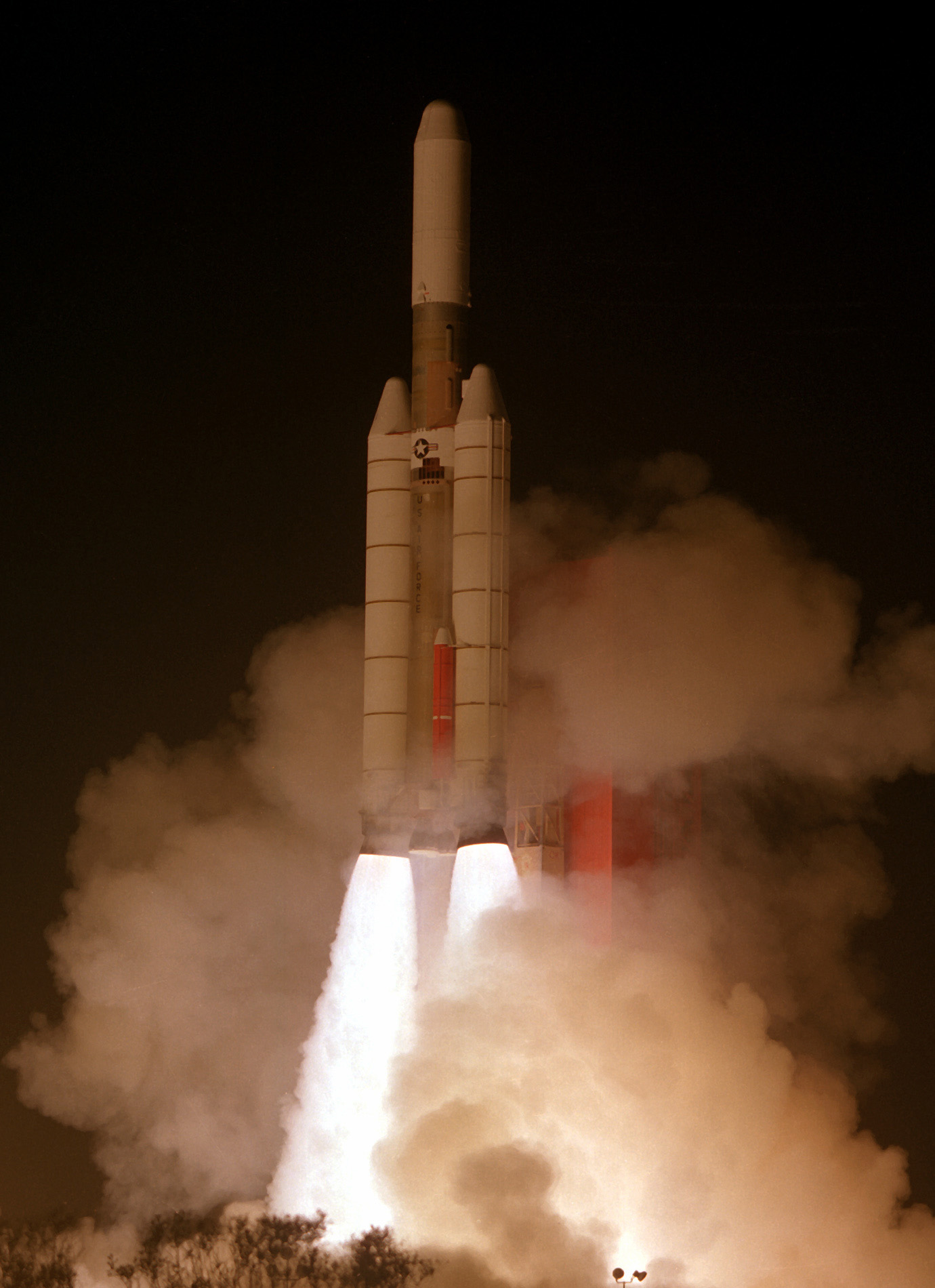
- Launch of the Titan 34D
- Function: Heavy carrier rocket
- Manufacturer: Martin Marietta
- Country of origin: United States

Size
- Stages: UA1206 (2); Titan 3B-1; Titan 3B-2; Inertial Upper Stage; Transtage

Capacity

Payload to LEO
- Mass: 14,515 kg (32,000 lb)

Payload to GTO
- Mass: 5,000 kg (11,000 lb)

Associated rockets
- Family: Titan

Launch history
- Status: Retired
- Launch sites: LC-40, CCAFS; SLC-4E, VAFB
- Total launches: 15
- Success(es): 12
- Failure: 2
- Partial failure: 1
- First flight: 30 October 1982
- Last flight: 4 September 1989

0 stage – UA1206
- Height: 27.56 m (90.4 ft)
- Diameter: 3.05 m (10.0 ft)
- Empty mass: 40,827 kg (90,008 lb)
- Gross mass: 251,427 kg (554,302 lb)
- Maximum thrust: 6,227 kN (1,400,000 lb_{f})
- Specific impulse: 265 s
- Burn time: 114 s
- Propellant: Solid (Polybutadiene acrylonitrile-based APCP)

First stage – Titan IIIB-1
- Height: 23.99 m (78.7 ft)
- Diameter: 3.05 m (10.0 ft)
- Empty mass: 7,000 kg (15,400 lb)
- Gross mass: 139,935 kg (308,504 lb)
- Powered by: 2× LR-87-11
- Maximum thrust: 2,413.191 kN (542,507 lb_{f})
- Specific impulse: 302 s
- Burn time: 161 s
- Propellant: N_{2}O_{4} / Aerozine 50

Second stage – Titan IIIB-2
- Height: 8.60 m (28.2 ft)
- Diameter: 3.05 m (10.0 ft)
- Empty mass: 2,900 kg (6,400 lb)
- Gross mass: 37,560 kg (82,810 lb)
- Powered by: LR-91-11
- Maximum thrust: 460.314 kN (103,483 lb_{f})
- Specific impulse: 316 s
- Burn time: 230 s
- Propellant: N_{2}O_{4} / Aerozine 50

The Titan 34D was a United States expendable launch vehicle used to launch a number of satellites for military applications.

== Service history ==
Derived from the Titan III, the Titan 34D featured Stage 1 and Stage 2 stretched with more powerful UA1206 solid motors. A variety of upper stages were available, including the Inertial Upper Stage, the Transfer Orbit Stage, and the Transtage. The Titan 34D made its maiden flight in the year of 1982 on the 30th of October with two DSCS defense communications satellites for the United States Department of Defense (DOD).

All of the launches were conducted from either LC-40 at Cape Canaveral Air Force Station or SLC-4E at Vandenberg Air Force Base. Overall, fifteen launches were carried out, of which three failed.

=== 1985 failure, Titan 34D-7 ===
The first failure was the launch of a KH-11 photoreconnaissance satellite in the year 1985 on the 28th of August. The core stage suffered a propulsion system malfunction and was destroyed by Range Safety. The flight proceeded normally until the core engine starts at T+108 seconds. At T+112 seconds, an abnormal start transient occurred and Engine 2 began experiencing thrust decay. At T+212 seconds, Engine 1 shut down, causing a loss of attitude control. The onboard computer shut off Engine 2 at T+256 seconds and began a premature separation and ignition of Stage 2. With the Titan now tumbling and headed back towards land, the destruct command was issued at T+272 seconds and the KH-11 crashed into the Pacific Ocean. During Stage 1's powered flight, the oxidizer tank began leaking N_{2}O_{4} which was thought to have resulted in the loss of lubrication to the Engine 1 turbopump and breakdown of the pinion gear. The attempts by the Navy to salvage booster debris from the ocean floor were largely unsuccessful. Investigators also complained that tracking camera coverage during the core stage burn was inadequate.

Titan 34D-7 was the first failed launch of a solid motor-equipped Titan vehicle from Vandenberg (there have been several failures from Cape Canaveral over the years) and was particularly vexing because of inadequate launch data. The Titan III's flawless West Coast launch record meant that the Air Force felt confident enough to remove several telemetry measurements from the boosters in the interest of reduced weight and complexity. There had evidently been leaks from both the fuel and oxidizer tanks, as well as suspicion hinged on clamps that held the propellant feed lines in place. However, the clamps had not failed on any previous launches so it was not clear why they would suddenly fail now. Some members of the investigative board even proposed that the SRBs had suffered an exhaust gas leak which caused damage to the core stage. As evidence, they noted that a piece of cork insulation had broken off one SRB shortly after launch. The official cause of the failure was "Leakage of oxidizer resulting in loss of turbopump lubrication and breakdown of the pinion gear." However, most of the members of the investigative team were unsatisfied with this verdict.

As a result of 34D-7, the Air Force took measures to ensure that a repeat failure would not occur. These included reinstalling some of the deleted telemetry probes on the Titan as well as improved camera coverage; the next launch would even have the aircraft flying overhead to provide additional photography.

=== 1986 failure, Titan 34D-9 ===
Titan 34D-9 was launched 18 April 1986 at Vandenberg AFB. Instead of the advanced KH-11 satellite carried on 34D-7, this booster carried the older model KH-9 in what would be the final launch of that satellite and the final launch of a film capsule photoreconnaissance satellite by the United States. Lifting off at 10:45 AM Pacific Time, the Titan catastrophically exploded just above SLC-4E, showering the launch complex as well as the adjacent SLC-4W (used for Titan IIIB launches) with debris and toxic propellant.

The investigation indicated the right solid rocket motor rupturing starting at T+6 seconds with the resulting torque on the launch vehicle caused the left SRM to break away. This triggered its automatic destruct system, blowing Stage 1 to pieces and rupturing Stage 2's N_{2}O_{4} tank. The upper stages were ejected and launched through the air until a manual destruct command was sent by the range safety officer at T+20 seconds. The KH-9 was also blown up by its internal self-destruct mechanism, which was designed to destroy the classified satellite in the event of a launch malfunction. Debris rained onto SLC-4E, badly damaging the launch complex in the process and starting numerous small fires, some of which burned for up to two days. Extracting launch personnel from the blockhouse proved difficult due to the area around the pad being filled with toxic fumes and burning debris. The casing rupture had damaged the Inadvertent Separation Destruct System (ISDS) lanyards and prevented proper destruction of the SRM, which came down largely intact onto a concrete structure near the pad, which was unoccupied at the time of launch.

The disaster drew comparisons to the Challenger shuttle accident three months earlier, which was also the victim of a solid rocket motor malfunction. However, the Titan incident was found to have a different cause, as the O-rings had not burned-through. A small air pocket between the SRM propellant and its metal motor casing allowed hot exhaust gases to burn through the casing and eventually rupture the SRM. The loss of two photoreconnaissance satellites in a row also badly hampered American efforts to acquire intelligence on Soviet activities.

The Air Force, before finding out the true cause of 34D-9's failure, was so puzzled at the loss of two Titan IIIs in a row that it believed for a time that saboteurs had been at work on Vandenberg Air Force Base, and it had base personnel comb the nearby hills for bullet casings.

Due to the classified payload, extensive efforts were made to clean up all remains of the KH-9, whose film reels were ripped apart into hundreds of small pieces and scattered around the pad area. The satellite debris was taken away for burial in an undisclosed location in the State of Nevada.

The investigation found that the manufacturer of the UA1206 motors, Chemical Systems Division of United Technologies had inadequate quality control measures. Due to the Shuttle program, demand for expendable launch vehicles (ELVs) was greatly reduced during the 1980s and manufacturers had been cutting costs, dropping technical personnel, and preparing to phase out ELVs. However, the Challenger disaster created a renewed emphasis on ELVs and would see a considerable expansion of the upcoming Titan IV program, which was originally intended for just ten launches.

The exact reason for the air pocket in the #2 SRM was never satisfactorily determined. While all the rocket segments were at least five years old (since all flight article Titan 34Ds had been manufactured and delivered by 1982 and the production line long since shut down), there had been no similar problems on other SRMs of the same age. Thanks to Titan 34D-9 (and because an SRB malfunction was a possible cause of 34D-7's failure), more stringent measures were put in place. This included the construction of the Non-Destructive Testing (NDT) High Energy X-Ray Facility at Cape Canaveral in a crash program lasting 83 days from the start of construction to first tests in which Titan SRM segments were X-rayed to find propellant voids.

SLC-4E was out of commission until October 1987, after which it was the site of the remaining two Titan 34D launches without incident.

== Specification ==
The Titan 34D had a payload capacity of 14,515 kg (32,000 lb) to low Earth orbit, and of 5,000 kg (11,000 lb) to a GTO.

== Use with Vortex satellites ==
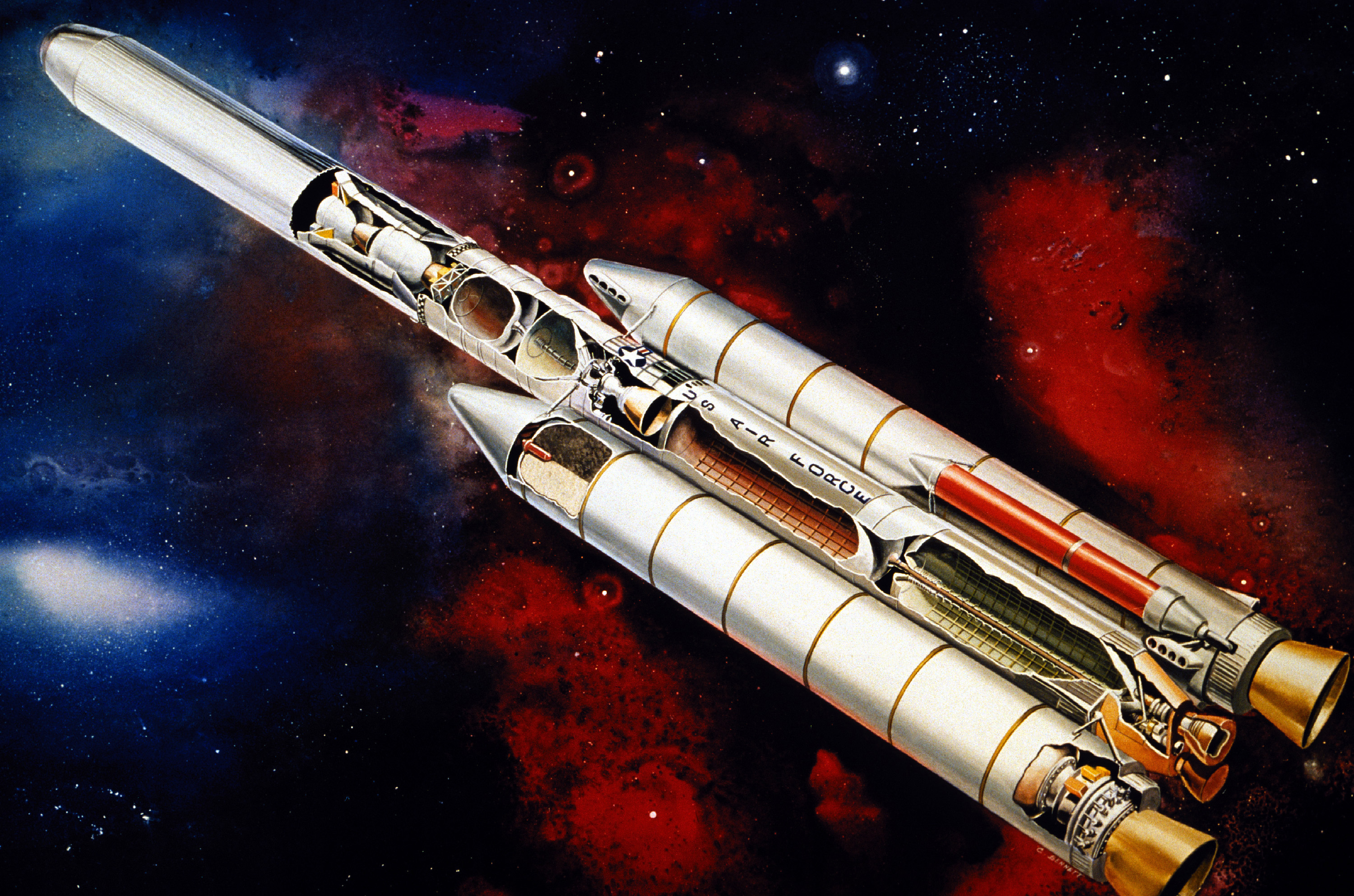
Artist's concept of Titan 34D

Three Vortex satellites were launched using Titan 34D vehicles between 1984 and 1989.

Date	Spacecraft	NSSDC ID	Comments
31 January 1984	OPS 0441	1984-009A	also called Vortex 4
2 September 1988	USA 31	1988-077A	also called Vortex 5
10 May 1989	USA 37	1989-035A	also called Vortex 6

== Launch history ==
Date/time (GMT)	Launch site	S/N	Upper stage	Payload	Outcome	Remarks
30 October 1982; 04:05	CCAFS LC-40	34D-1	IUS	DSCS-II-15 (OPS-9445); DSCS-III-A1	Success	
20 June 1983; 18:45	VAFB LC-4E	34D-5	N/A	OPS-0721 (KH-9)	Success	
31 January 1984; 03:08	CCAFS LC-40	34D-10	Transtage	OPS-0441 (Vortex)	Success	
14 April 1984; 16:52	CCAFS LC-40	34D-11	Transtage	DSP-11 (OPS-7641)	Success	
25 June 1984; 18:47	VAFB LC-4E	34D-4	N/A	USA-2 (KH-9)	Success	
4 December 1984; 18:03	VAFB LC-4E	34D-6	N/A	USA-6 (KH-11)	Success	
22 December 1984; 00:02	CCAFS LC-40	34D-13	Transtage	DSP-12 (USA-7)	Success	
28 August 1985; 21:20	VAFB LC-4E	34D-7	N/A	KH-11	Failure	First stage propellant leak caused engine to shut down.
18 April 1986; 18:45	VAFB LC-4E	34D-9	N/A	KH-9	Failure	Solid rocket motor exploded at T+8 seconds due to booster segment joint failure.
26 October 1987; 21:32	VAFB LC-4E	34D-15	N/A	USA-27 (KH-11)	Success	
29 November 1987; 03:27	CCAFS LC-40	34D-8	Transtage	DSP-13 (USA-28)	Success	
2 September 1988; 12:05	CCAFS LC-40	34D-3	Transtage	USA-31 (Vortex)	Partial failure	Transtage 3rd burn shut down early.
6 November 1988; 18:03	VAFB LC-4E	34D-14	N/A	USA-33 (KH-11)	Success	
10 May 1989; 19:47	CCAFS LC-40	34D-16	Transtage	USA-37 (Vortex)	Success	
4 September 1989; 05:54	CCAFS LC-40	34D-2	Transtage	DSCS-II-16 (USA-43); DSCS-III-A2 (USA-44)	Success	

== See also ==
- Titan III
- Titan IIIB
- Titan Missile Museum
- List of Titan launches
