= Transtage =

American upper rocket stage used on Titan III

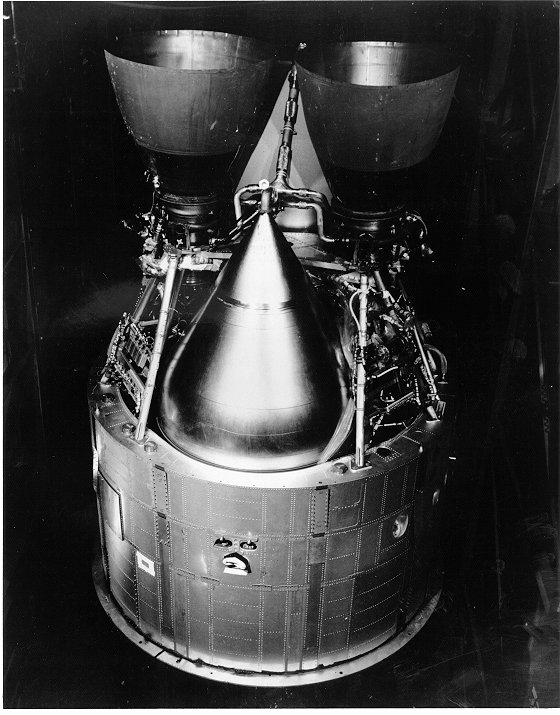
- A Transtage
- Manufacturer: Martin Marietta
- Country of origin: United States
- Used on: Titan III

General characteristics
- Height: 4.57 meters (15.0 ft)
- Diameter: 3.05 meters (10.0 ft)
- Gross mass: 12,247 kilograms (27,000 lb)

Engine details
- Powered by: 2 AJ10-138
- Maximum thrust: 8,000 lbf (36 kN) each
- Specific impulse: 311 seconds (3.05 km/s)
- Burn time: 440 seconds
- Propellant: Aerozine 50 / N_{2}O_{4}

Transtage, given the United States Air Force designation SSB-10A, was an American upper stage used on Titan III rockets, developed by Martin Marietta and Aerojet.

== History ==
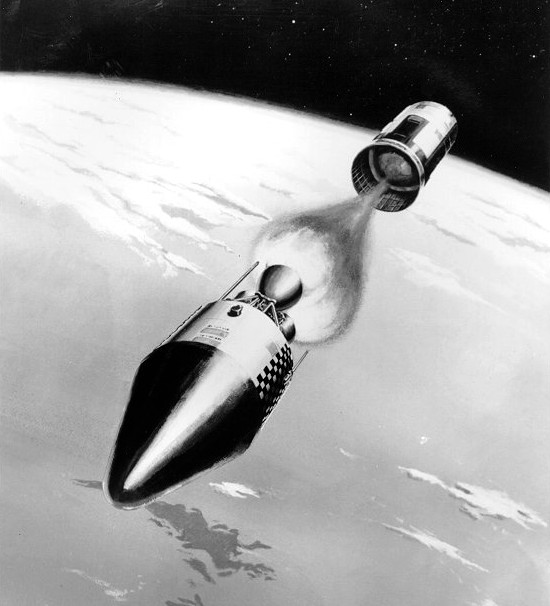
Artist's conception of a Titan III Transtage burn

Transtage was developed in anticipation of a requirement to launch military payloads to geostationary orbit; a contract for development of the stage was issued on 20 August 1962. Transtage used a pressure-fed two-chamber configuration, using Aerozine 50 fuel and nitrogen tetroxide as oxidizer; the thrust chambers were gimbaled for steering and each produced 8,000 lbf (36 kN) of thrust. The design specification required up to three restarts during the first six hours of a mission.

Forty-seven Titan III launches are known to have used Transtage upper stages; of those, three are known to have suffered launch failures. The first launch, boosted by a Titan IIIA, occurred on 1 September 1964; the Transtage failed to pressurize, resulting in premature engine cutoff, and a failure to reach orbit. The second launch, on 10 December, was successful, and all ensuing launches used the Titan IIIC launch vehicle. The last launch of a Transtage was on 4 September 1989, boosted by a Titan 34D rocket.

== See also ==
- Centaur (rocket stage)
- Inertial Upper Stage
- RM-81 Agena
