= UA120 =

Family of American solid rocket boosters

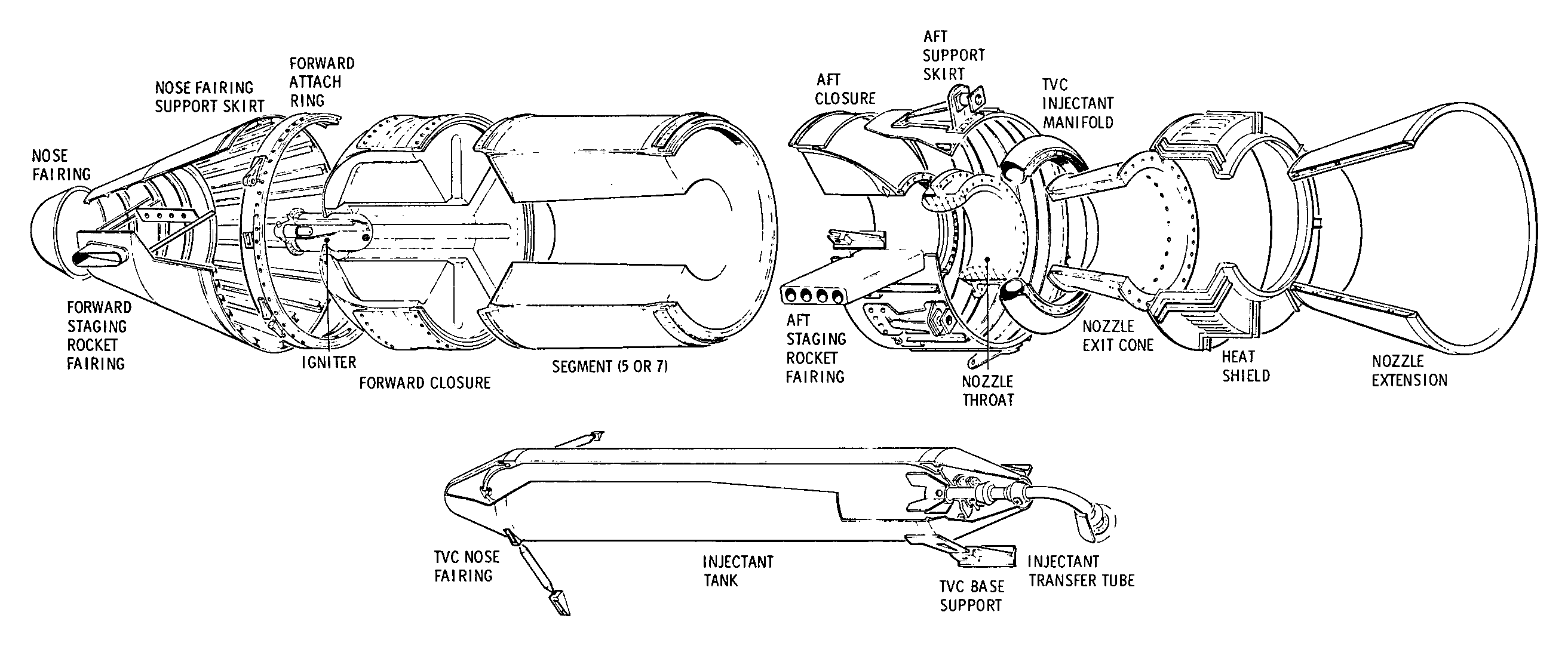
Schematic of the UA1205 and UA1207 boosters

UA120 was a family of American solid rocket boosters, manufactured by the Chemical Systems Division of United Aircraft (later United Technologies Corporation). They were used as strap-on boosters for the Titan rocket family. Several variants existed, with a varying number of segments.

== Design ==
All versions of UA120 shared a common design, with the only significant differentiating factor being the length of the motor. It was a segmented design, with between five and seven motor segments possible. A solid propellant used was a ammonium perchlorate composite propellant with polybutadiene acrylonitrile (PBAN) binder. The stage had an external diameter of 120 inches.

Attitude control in flight was provided by means of a liquid injection thrust vector control (LITVC) system, with an external nacelle containing nitrogen tetroxide attached to the side of each booster. Solid fueled separation rockets, used to jettison the spent boosters, were affixed at the top and bottom of the stage.

Thrust-termination capability, necessary for crewed rockets such as the Space Shuttle or Manned Orbiting Laboratory, was to be provided by two pyrotechnically triggered ports on the forward closure, which when opened would allow for the non-propulsive venting of exhaust gasses.

The forward end of the stage contained an aerodynamic nose cone, an ignitor, separation rockets, and the forward attachment ring. The aft end contained additional separation rockets, the nozzle, and a heat shield.

== Variants ==
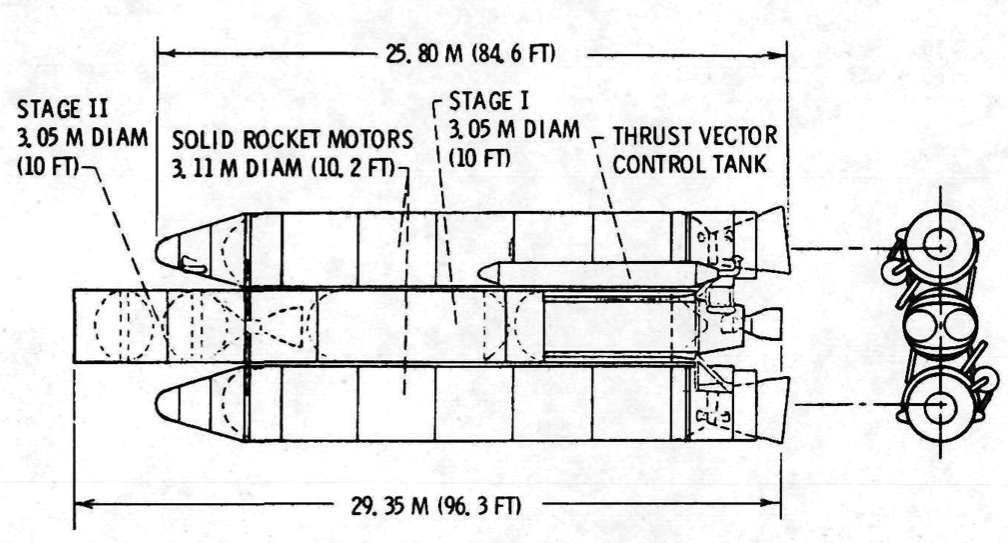
Titan IIIE with UA1205 solid rocket motors

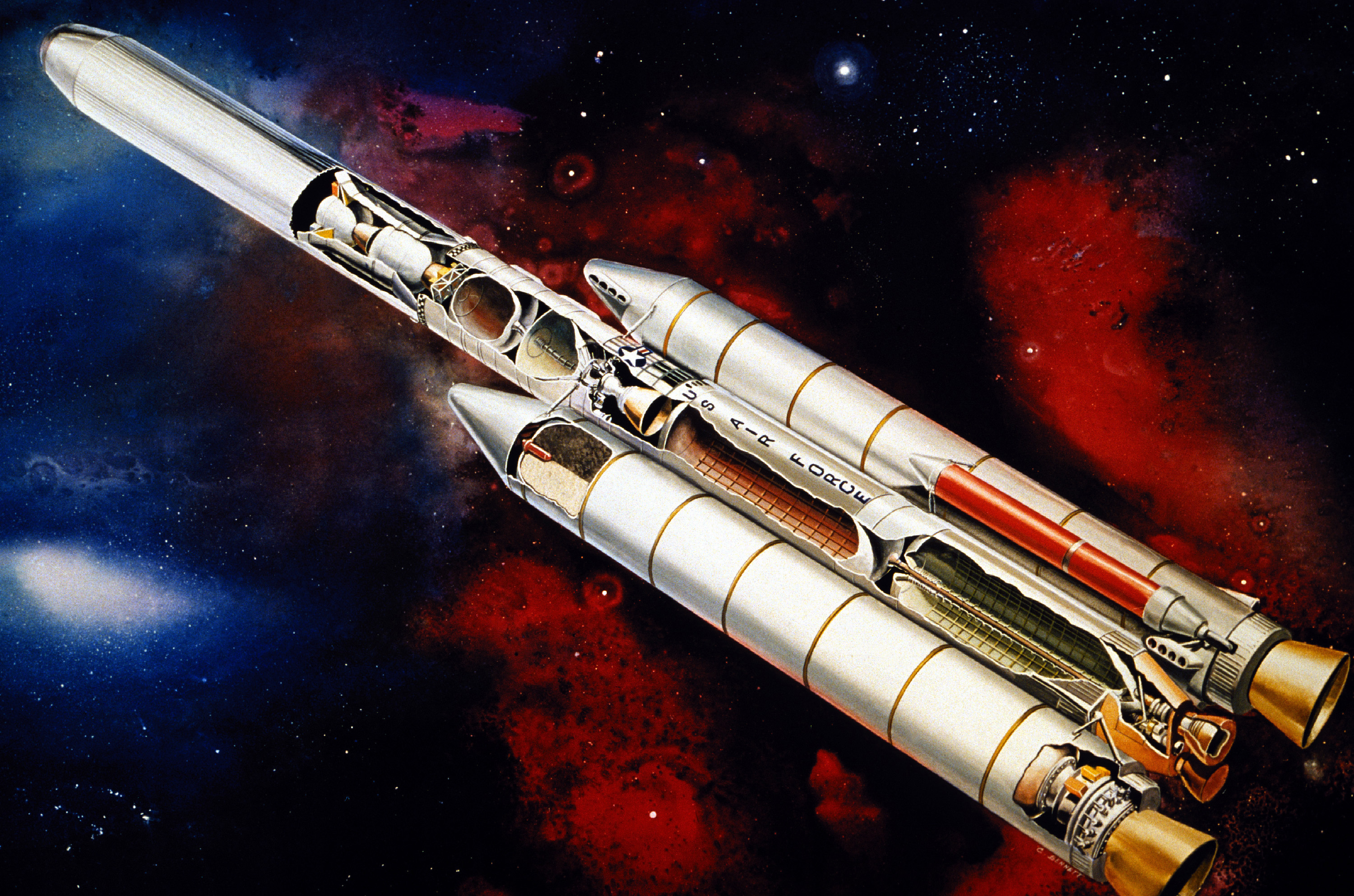
Titan 34D with UA1206 solid rocket motors

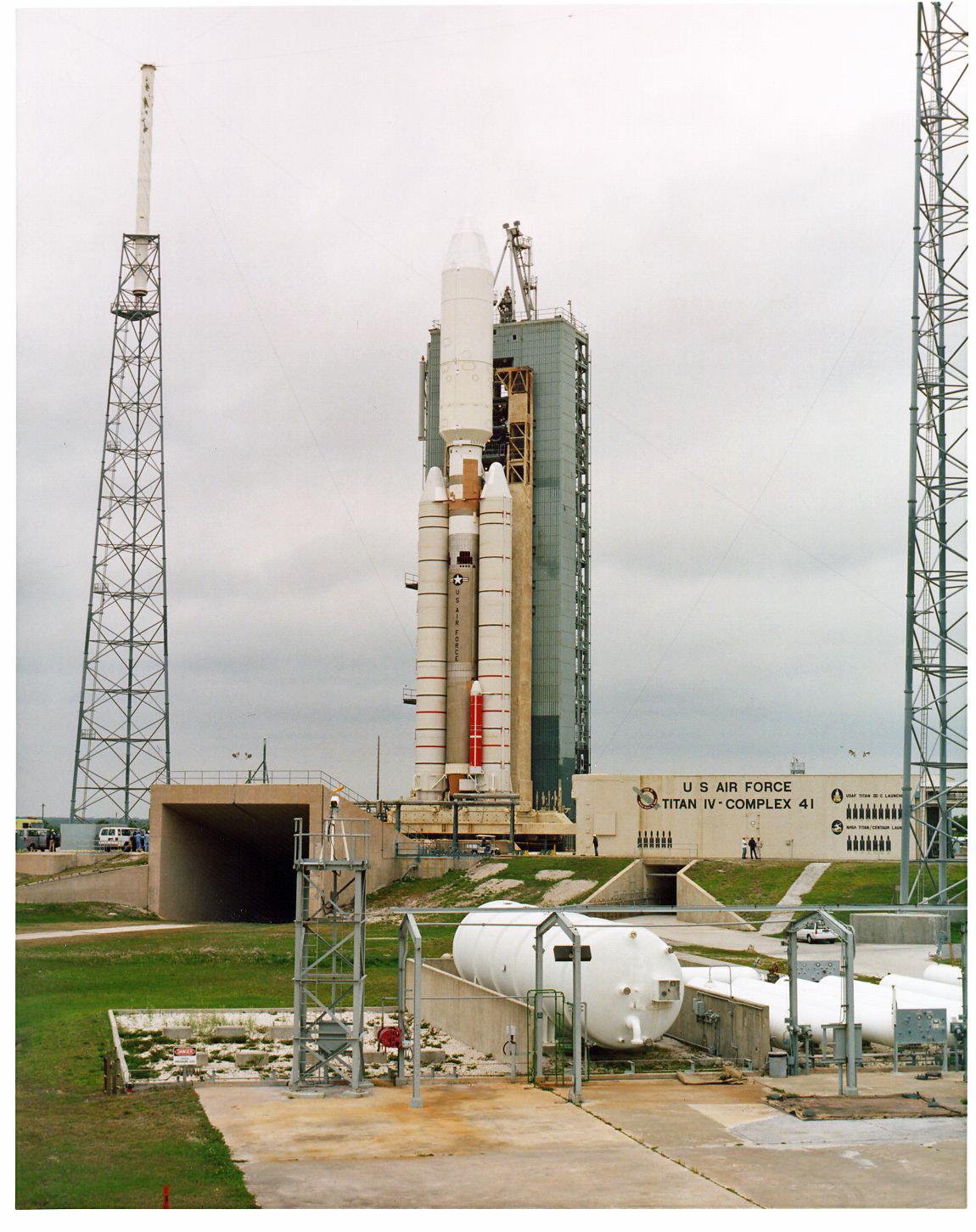
Titan IV-A with UA1207 solid rocket motors

The overall design of each variant was very similar, the main difference being the number of segments used. This is indicated by the number at the end of each designation.

=== UA1205 ===
UA1205 was flown between 1965 and 1982, and used as a strap-on booster on the Titan IIIC, Titan 23C, Titan IIID, and Titan IIIE rockets, besides being proposed for use on several derivatives of the Saturn rocket family, like the Saturn IB-D and MLV-V-4.

=== UA1206 ===
The UA1206 was flown between 1982 and 1992, and used as a strap-on booster on Titan 34D and Commercial Titan III.

=== UA1207 ===
UA1207 was first flown in 1989 and used on Titan IV-A. It was proposed for several other variants of Titan III and IV, as well as the Titan-IIIM, derivatives of the Saturn rocket family and the Space Shuttle.

== See also ==
- Solid Rocket Motor Upgrade
