= Titan (rocket family) =

Family of launch vehicles used in U.S. Air Force and space programs (1959–2005)

Titan family
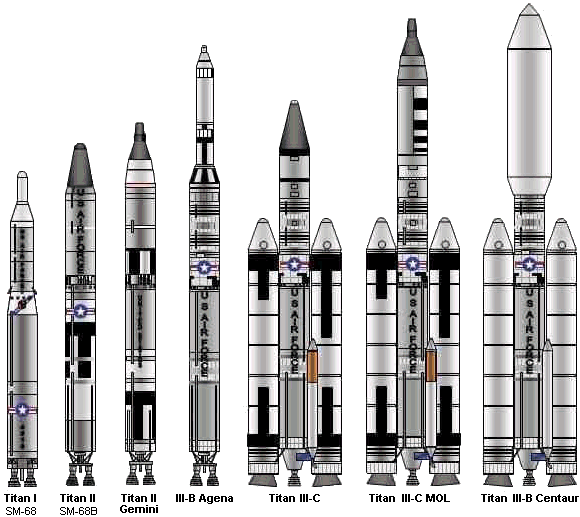
- The Titan rocket family, from left to right: Titan I (ICBM), II (ICBM), II GLV (manned), IIIB, IIIC, IIIM (manned), IIIE
- Manufacturer: Glenn L. Martin Company
- Country of origin: United States

Associated rockets
- Derivative work: Titan I Titan II; Titan IIIA; Titan IIIB; Titan IIIC; Titan IIID; Titan IIIE; Titan IIIM; Titan 34D; Titan IV

Launch history
- Status: Retired
- Total launches: 368
- First flight: December 20, 1958
- Last flight: October 19, 2005

Titan was a family of American intercontinental ballistic missiles (ICBM) and medium- and heavy-lift expendable launch vehicles used between 1959 and 2005. The Titan I and Titan II served as part of the United States Air Force's ICBM arsenal until 1987, while later variants were adapted for space launch purposes. Titan launch vehicles were used for 368 missions in total, including all Project Gemini crewed flights in the mid-1960s, as well as numerous U.S. military, civilian, and scientific payloads—ranging from reconnaissance satellites to space probes sent throughout the Solar System.

== Titan I missile ==
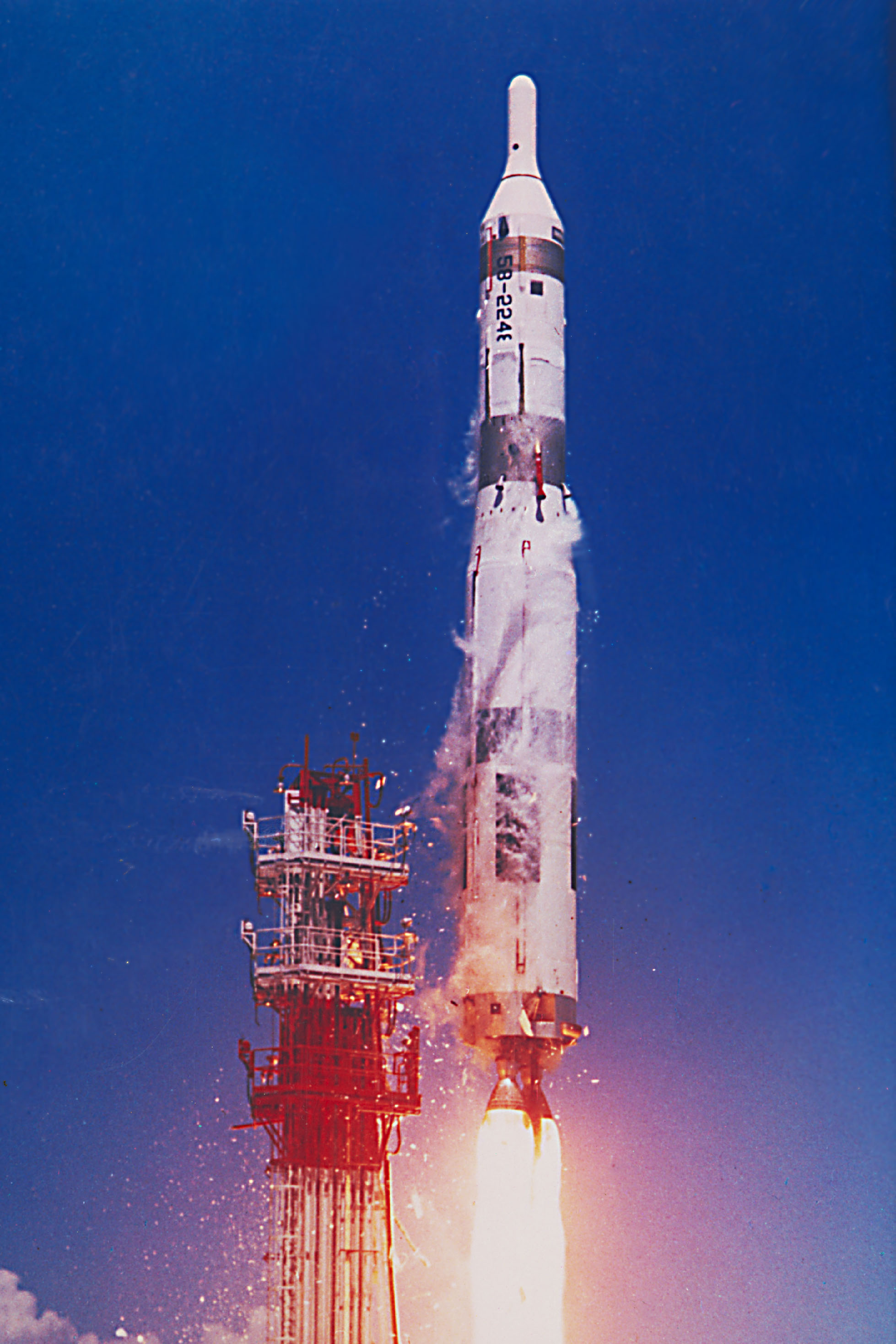
Titan I ICBM

The HGM-25A Titan I, built by the Martin Company, was the first version of the Titan family of rockets. It began as a backup ICBM project in case the SM-65 Atlas was delayed. It was a two-stage rocket operational from early 1962 to mid-1965 whose LR-87 booster engine was powered by RP-1 (kerosene) and liquid oxygen (LOX). The ground guidance for the Titan was the UNIVAC ATHENA computer, designed by Seymour Cray, based in a hardened underground bunker. Using radar data, it made course corrections during the burn phase.

Unlike decommissioned Thor, Atlas, and Titan II missiles, the Titan I inventory was scrapped and never reused for space launches or RV tests, as all support infrastructure for the missile had been converted to the Titan II/III family by 1965.

== Titan II ==
The Titan II family consists of the Titan II ICBM and two later versions adapted for space launches, the Titan II GLV and the Titan 23G.

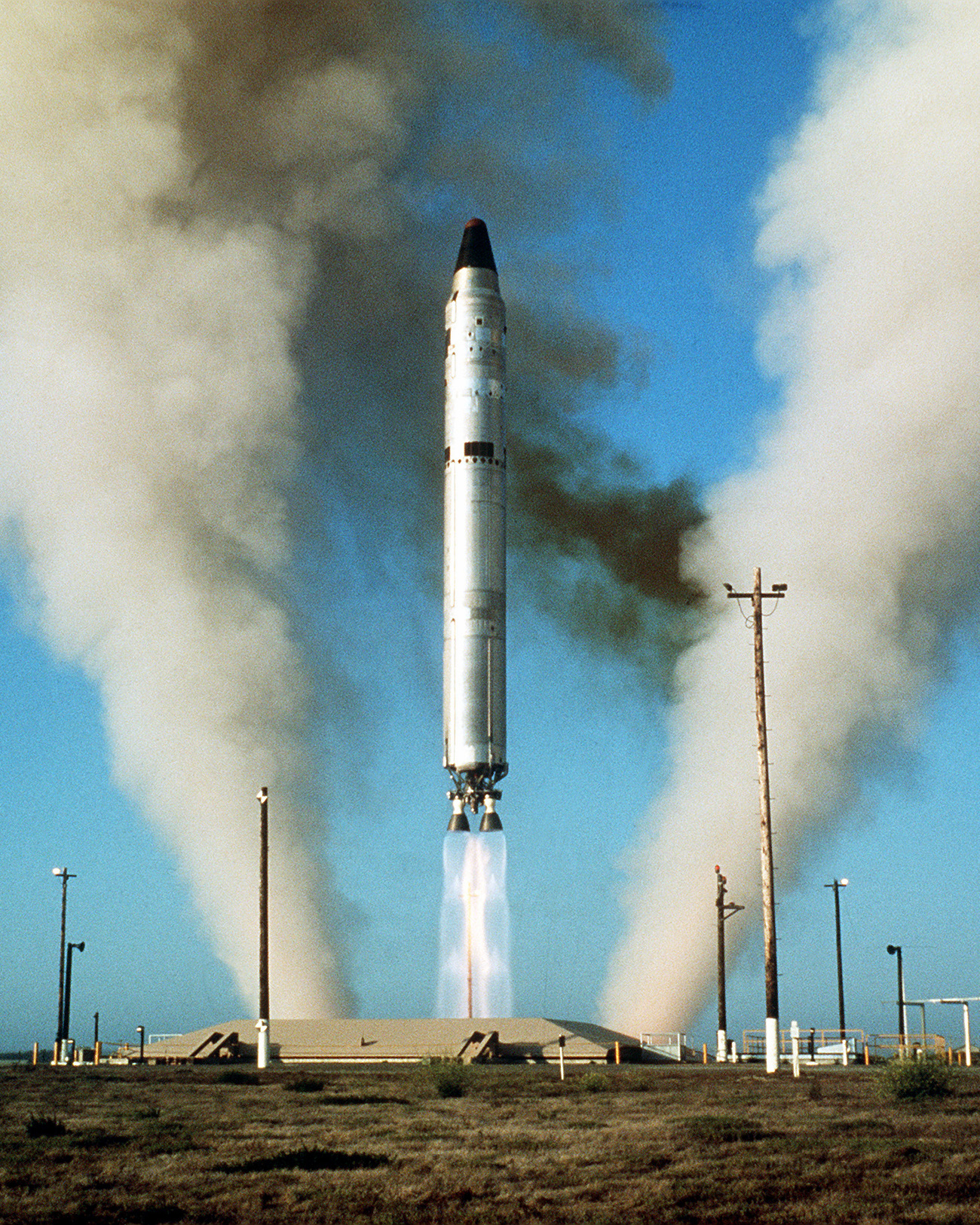
Titan II ICBM

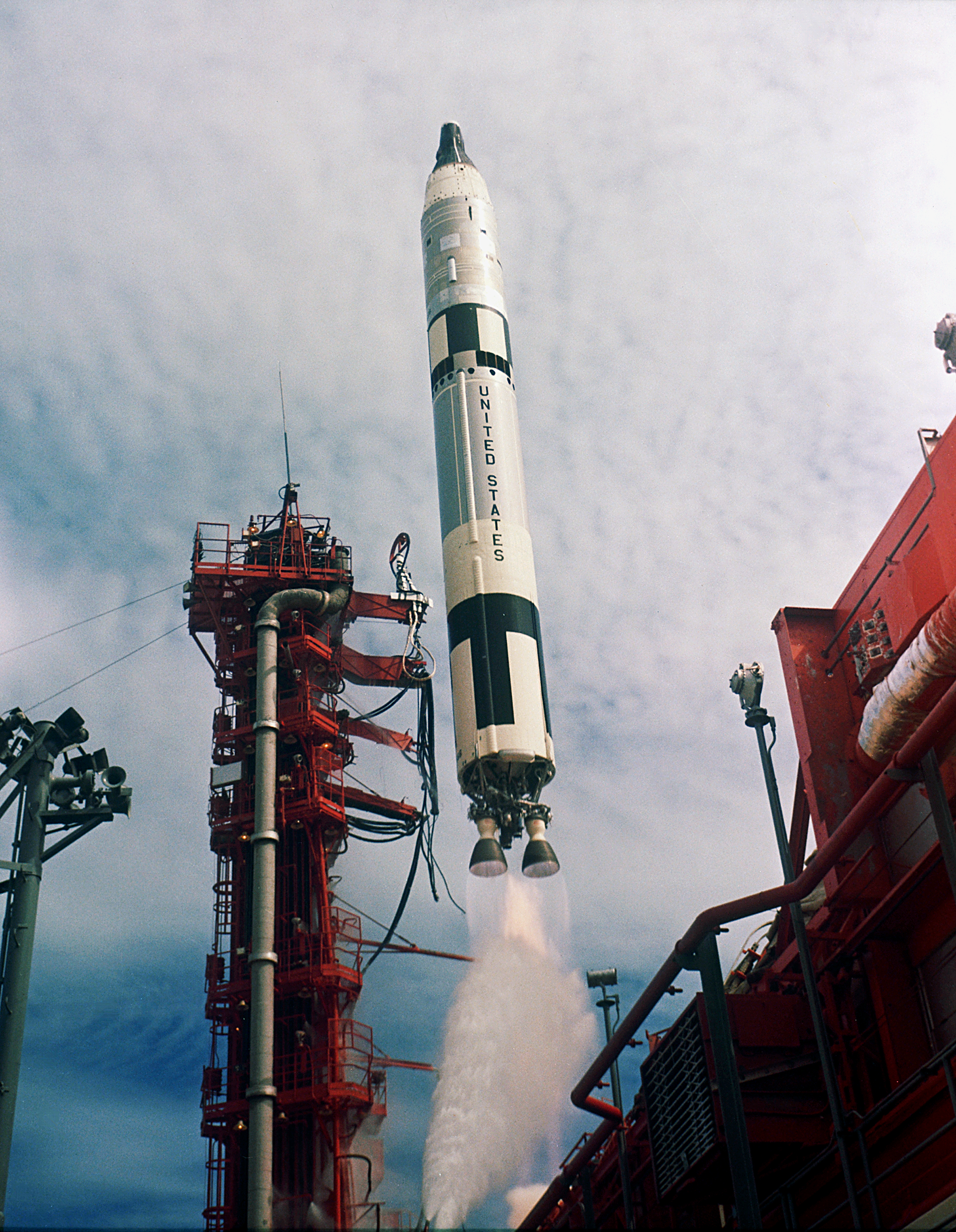
Titan II GLV

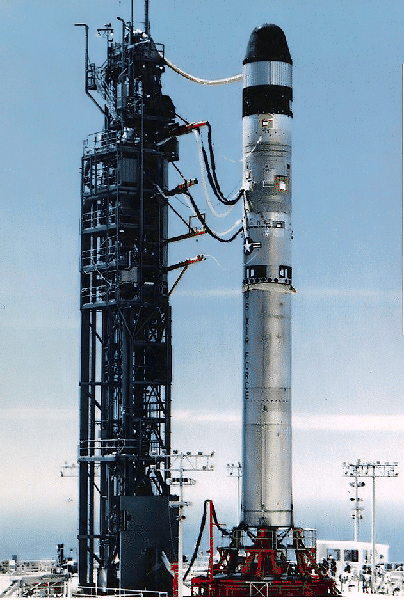
Titan 23G

=== Titan II missile ===
Most of the Titan rockets were the Titan II ICBM and their civilian derivatives for NASA. The Titan II used the LR-87-5 engine, a modified version of the LR-87, that used a hypergolic propellant combination of nitrogen tetroxide (NTO) for its oxidizer and Aerozine 50 (a 50/50 mix of hydrazine and unsymmetrical dimethylhydrazine (UDMH) instead of the liquid oxygen and RP-1 propellant of the Titan I).

The first Titan II guidance system was built by AC Spark Plug. It used an inertial measurement unit made by AC Spark Plug derived from original designs from the Charles Stark Draper Laboratory at MIT. The missile guidance computer (MGC) was the IBM ASC-15. When spares for this system became hard to obtain, it was replaced by a more modern guidance system, the Delco Electronics Universal Space Guidance System (USGS). The USGS used a Carousel IV IMU and a Magic 352 computer. The USGS was already in use on the Titan III space launcher when work began in March 1978 to replace the Titan II guidance system. The main reason was to reduce the cost of maintenance by $72 million per year; the conversions were completed in 1981.

==== Hypergolic propellants ====
Liquid oxygen is dangerous to use in an enclosed space, such as a missile silo, and cannot be stored for long periods in the booster oxidizer tank. Several Atlas and Titan I rockets exploded and destroyed their silos, although without loss of life. The Martin Company was able to improve the design with the Titan II. The RP-1/LOX combination was replaced by a room-temperature fuel whose oxidizer did not require cryogenic storage. The same first-stage rocket engine was used with some modifications. The diameter of the second stage was increased to match the first stage. The Titan II's hypergolic fuel and oxidizer ignited on contact, but they were highly toxic and corrosive liquids. The fuel was Aerozine 50, a 50/50 mix of hydrazine and UDMH, and the oxidizer was NTO.

==== Accidents at silos ====
There were several accidents in Titan II silos resulting in loss of life and/or serious injuries.

In August 1965, 53 construction workers were killed in fire in a missile silo northwest of Searcy, Arkansas. The fire started when hydraulic fluid used in the Titan II was ignited by a welding torch.

The liquid fuel missiles were prone to developing leaks of their toxic propellants. At a silo outside Rock, Kansas, an oxidizer transfer line carrying NTO ruptured on August 24, 1978. An ensuing orange vapor cloud forced 200 rural residents to evacuate the area. A staff sergeant of the maintenance crew was killed while attempting a rescue and a total of twenty were hospitalized.

Another site at Potwin, Kansas leaked NTO oxidizer in April 1980 with no fatalities, and was later closed.

In September 1980, at Titan II silo 374-7 near Damascus, Arkansas, a technician dropped an 8 lb (3.6 kg) socket that fell 70 ft (21 m), bounced off a thrust mount, and broke the skin of the missile's first stage, over eight hours prior to an eventual explosion. The puncture occurred about 6:30 p.m. and when a leak was detected shortly after, the silo was flooded with water and civilian authorities were advised to evacuate the area. As the problem was being attended to at around 3 a.m., leaking rocket fuel ignited and blew the 8,000 lb (3,630 kg) nuclear warhead out of the silo. It landed harmlessly several hundred feet away. There was one fatality and 21 were injured, all from the emergency response team from Little Rock AFB. The explosion blew the 740-ton launch tube cover 200 ft (60 m) into the air and left a crater 250 feet (76 m) in diameter.

==== Missile retirement ====
The 54 Titan IIs in Arizona, Arkansas, and Kansas were replaced by 50 MX "Peacekeeper" solid-fuel rocket missiles in the mid-1980s; the last Titan II silo was deactivated in May 1987. The 54 Titan IIs had been fielded along with a thousand Minuteman missiles from the mid-1960s through the mid-1980s.

A number of Titan I and Titan II missiles have been distributed as museum displays across the United States.

=== Titan II launch vehicle ===
The most famous use of the civilian Titan II was in the NASA Gemini program of crewed space capsules in the mid-1960s. Twelve Titan II GLVs were used for Project Gemini. Two flights were uncrewed and the remaining ten carried two-person crews. All of the launches were successful.

=== Titan 23G ===
Starting in the late 1980s, some of the deactivated Titan IIs were converted into space launch vehicles to be used for launching U.S. Government payloads. Titan 23G rockets consisted of two stages burning liquid propellant. The first stage was powered by one Aerojet LR87 engine with two combustion chambers and nozzles, and the second stage was propelled by an LR91. On some flights, the spacecraft included a kick motor, usually the Star-37XFP-ISS; however, the Star-37S was also used.

Thirteen were launched from Space Launch Complex 4W (SLC-4W) at Vandenberg Air Force Base starting in 1988. The final such vehicle launched a Defense Meteorological Satellite Program (DMSP) weather satellite on 18 October 2003.

== Titan III ==
The Titan III was a modified Titan II with optional solid rocket boosters. It was developed on behalf of the United States Air Force (USAF) as a heavy-lift satellite launcher to be used mainly to launch American military payloads and civilian intelligence agency satellites such as the Vela Hotel nuclear-test-ban monitoring satellites, observation and reconnaissance satellites (for intelligence-gathering), and various series of defense communications satellites. As a USAF project, Titan III was more formally known as Program 624A (SSLS), Standard Space Launch System, Standardized Space Launch System, Standardized Space Launching System or Standard Space Launching System (all abbreviated SSLS).

The Titan III core was similar to the Titan II, but had a few differences. These included:

- Thicker tank walls and ablative skirts to support the added weight of upper stages
- Radio ground guidance in place of the inertial guidance on ICBM Titan IIs
- Guidance package placed on the upper stages (if present)
- Removal of retrorockets and other unnecessary ICBM hardware
- Slightly larger propellant tanks in the second stage for longer burn time; since they expanded into some unused space in the avionics truss, the actual length of the stage remained unchanged.

The Titan III family used the same basic LR-87 engines as Titan II (with performance enhancements over the years), however SRB-equipped variants had a heat shield over them as protection from the SRB exhaust and the engines were modified for air-starting.

=== Avionics ===
The first guidance system for the Titan III used the AC Spark Plug company IMU (inertial measurement unit) and an IBM ASC-15 guidance computer from the Titan II. For the Titan III, the ASC-15 drum memory of the computer was lengthened to add 20 more usable tracks, which increased its memory capacity by 35%.

The more-advanced Titan IIIC used a Delco Carousel VB IMU and MAGIC 352 Missile Guidance Computer (MGC).

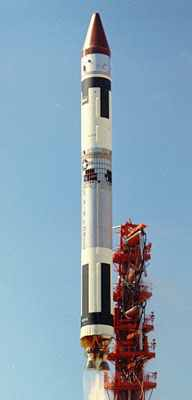
Titan IIIA

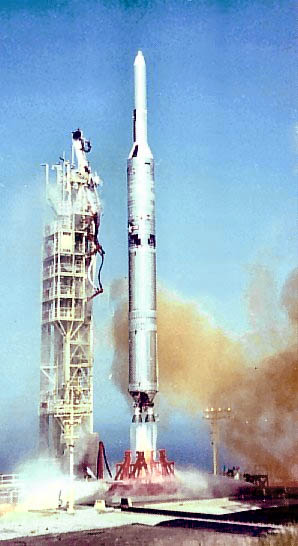
Titan IIIB

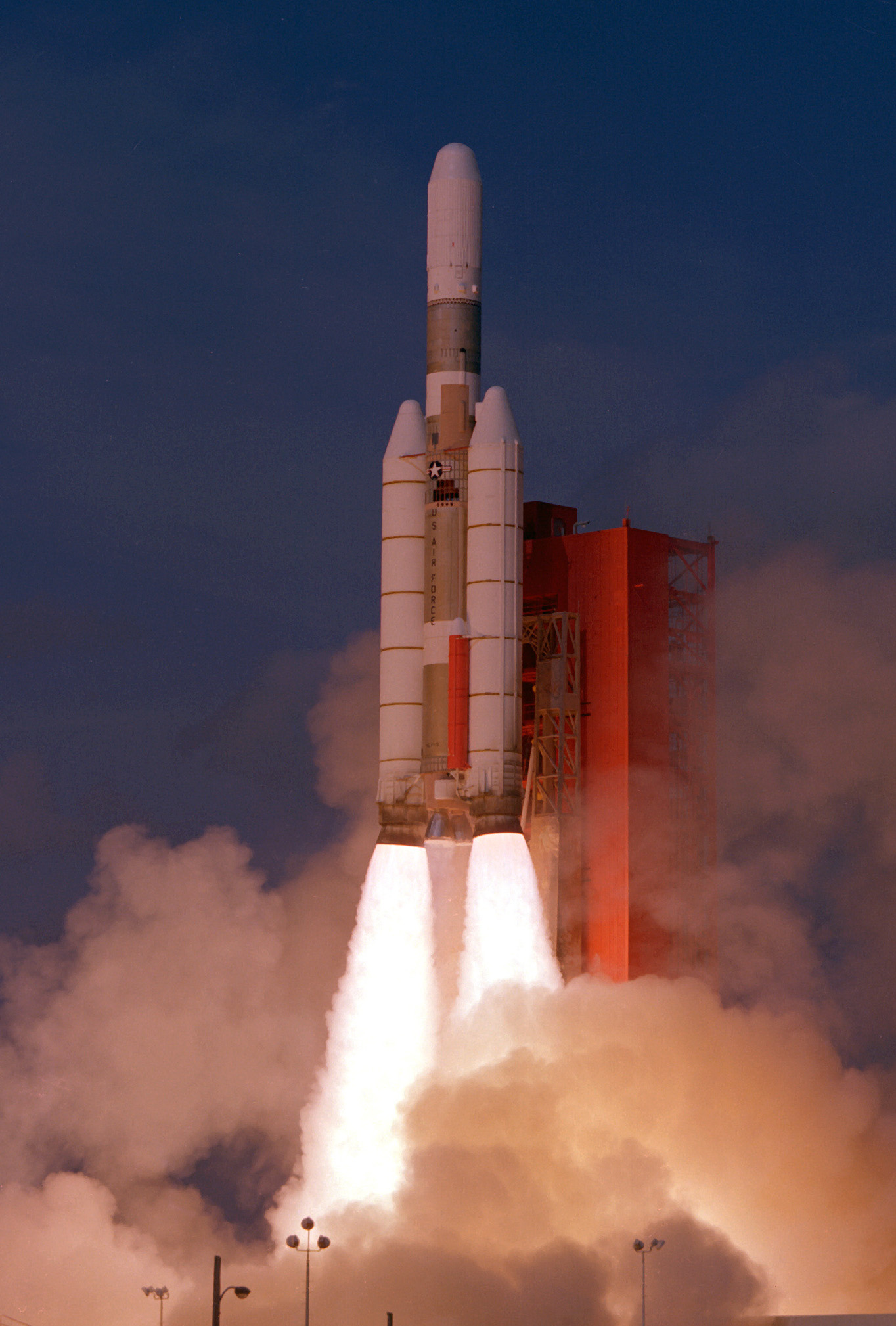
Titan IIIC

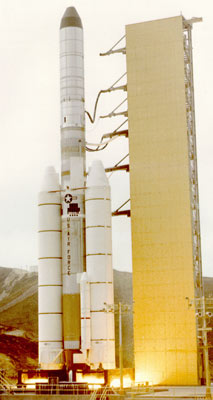
Titan IIID

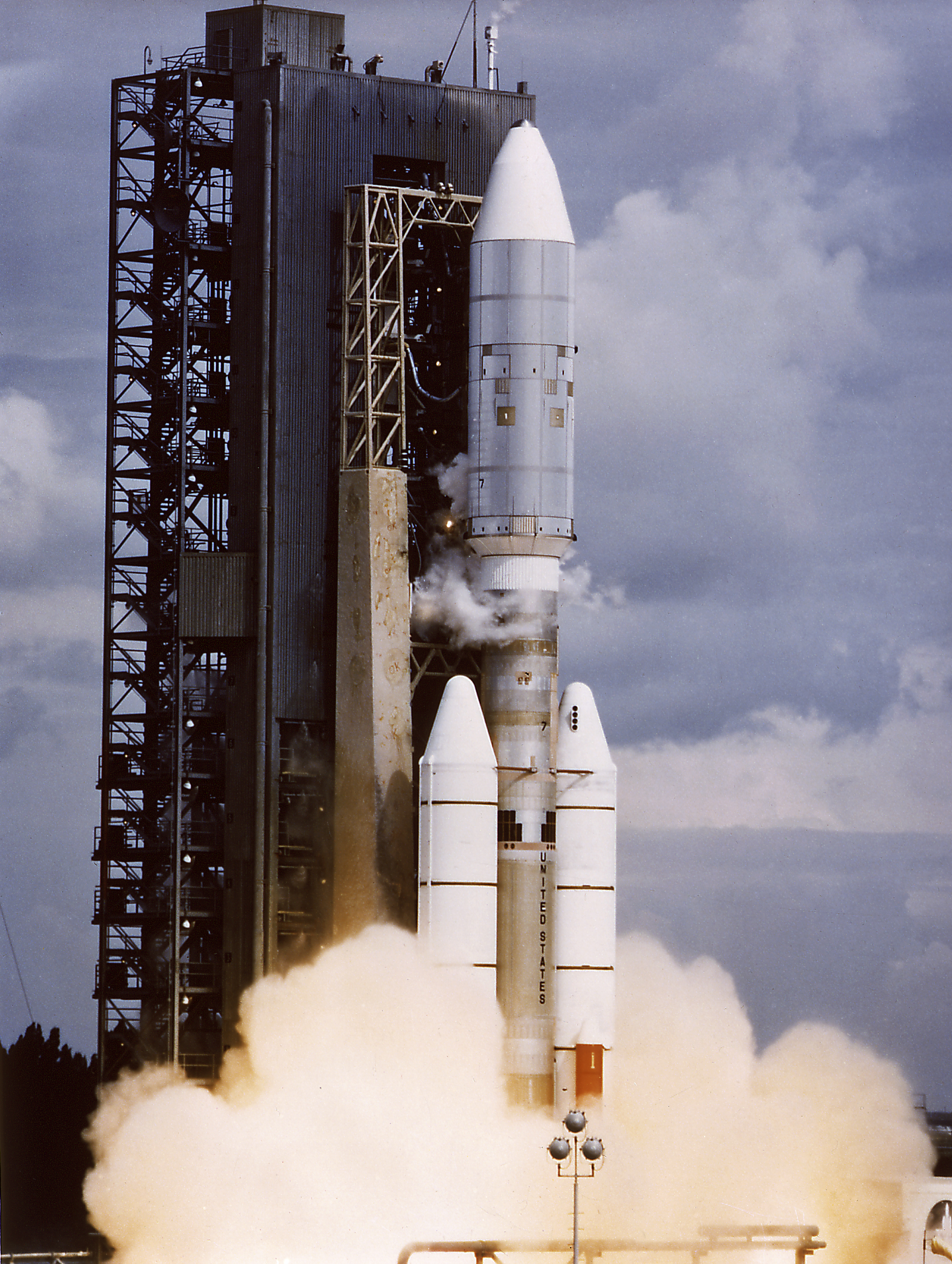
Titan IIIE

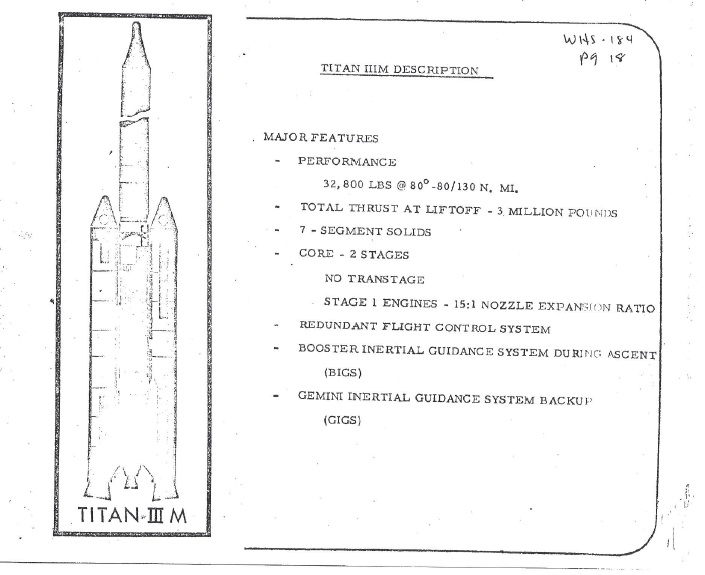
Titan IIIM

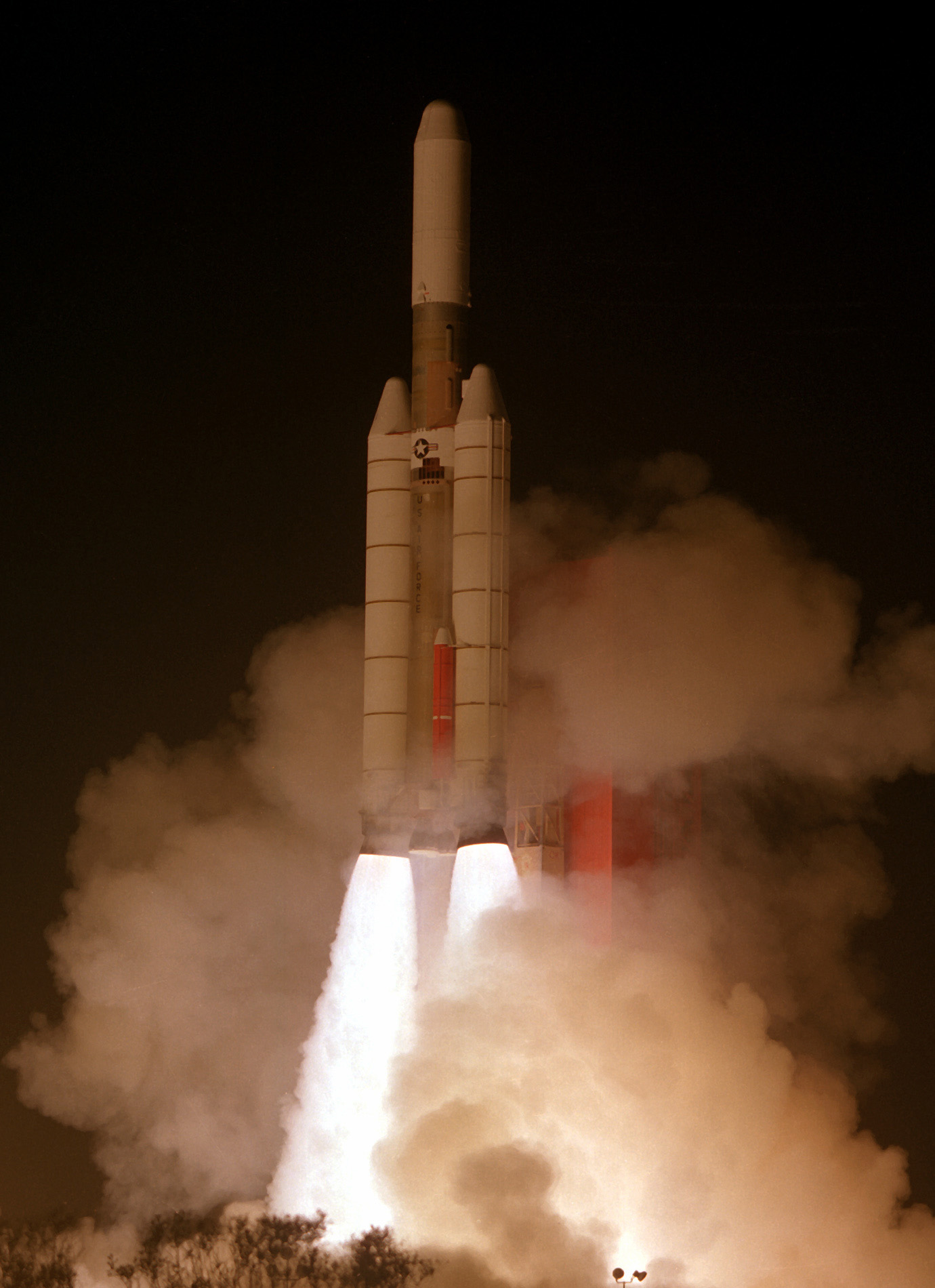
Titan 34D

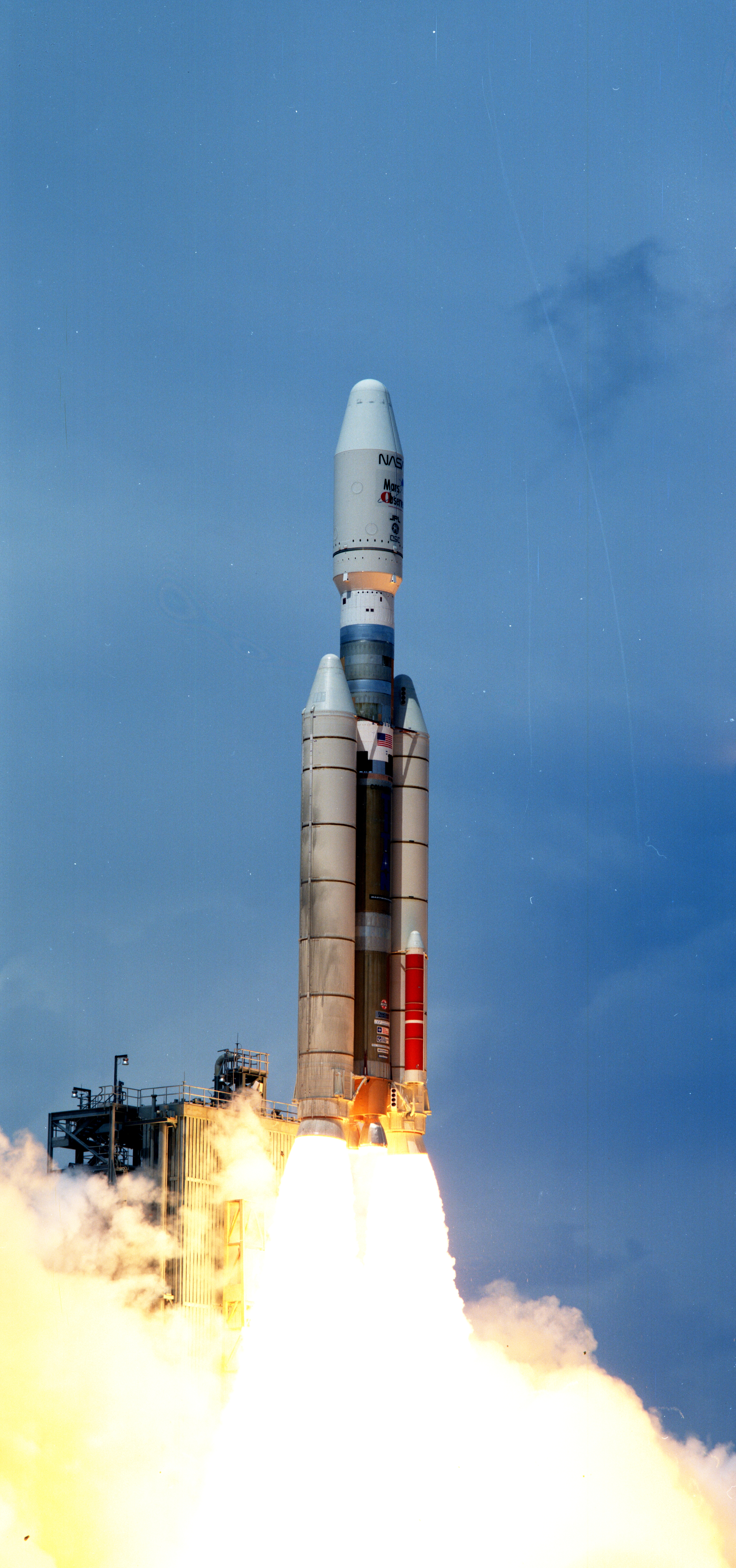
Commercial Titan III

=== Titan IIIA ===
The Titan IIIA was a prototype rocket booster and consisted of a standard Titan II rocket with a Transtage upper stage.

=== Titan IIIB ===
The Titan IIIB with its different versions (23B, 24B, 33B, and 34B) had the Titan III core booster with an Agena D upper stage. This combination was used to launch the KH-8 GAMBIT series of intelligence-gathering satellites. They were all launched from Vandenberg Air Force Base, due south over the Pacific into polar orbits. Their maximum payload mass was about 7,500 lb (3,000 kg).

=== Titan IIIC ===
The powerful Titan IIIC used a Titan III core rocket with two large strap-on solid-fuel boosters to increase its launch thrust and maximum payload mass. The solid-fuel boosters that were developed for the Titan IIIC represented a significant engineering advance over previous solid-fueled rockets, due to their large size and thrust, and their advanced thrust-vector control systems.

=== Titan IIID ===
The Titan IIID was the Vandenberg Air Force Base version of the Titan IIIC, without a Transtage, that was used to place members of the Key Hole series of reconnaissance satellites into polar low Earth orbits.

=== Titan IIIE ===
The Titan IIIE, with a high-specific-impulse Centaur upper stage, was used to launch several scientific spacecraft, including both of NASA's two Voyager space probes to Jupiter, Saturn and beyond, and both of the two Viking missions to place two orbiters around Mars and two instrumented landers on its surface.

=== Titan 34D ===
The Titan 34D featured Stage 1 and Stage 2 stretched with more powerful UA1206 solid motors. A variety of upper stages were available, including the Inertial Upper Stage, the Transfer Orbit Stage, and the Transtage. The Titan 34D made its maiden flight on 30 October 1982 with two DSCS defense communications satellites for the United States Department of Defense (DOD).

=== Commercial Titan III ===
Derived from the Titan 34D and originally proposed as a medium-lift expendable launch system for the US Air Force, who selected the Delta II instead. Development was continued as a commercial launch system, and the first rocket flew in 1990. The Commercial Titan III differed from the Titan 34D in that it had a stretched second stage, and a larger payload fairing to accommodate dual satellite payloads.

=== Titan IIIM ===
The Titan IIIM was intended to launch the Manned Orbiting Laboratory and other payloads. Development was cancelled in 1969. The projected UA1207 solid booster rockets were eventually used on the Titan IV, while the extended core was used in the 3B and 34B variants of the Titan IIIB.

== Titan IV ==
The Titan IV was an extended length Titan III with solid rocket boosters on its sides. The Titan IV could be launched with a Centaur upper stage, the USAF Inertial Upper Stage (IUS), or no upper stage at all. This rocket was used almost exclusively to launch US military or Central Intelligence Agency payloads. However, it was also used for a purely scientific purpose to launch the NASA–ESA Cassini / Huygens space probe to Saturn in 1997. The primary intelligence agency that needed the Titan IV's launch capabilities was the National Reconnaissance Office (NRO).

When it was being produced, the Titan IV was the most powerful uncrewed rocket available to the United States, with proportionally high manufacturing and operations expenses. By the time the Titan IV became operational, the requirements of the Department of Defense and the NRO for launching satellites had tapered off due to improvements in the longevity of reconnaissance satellites and the declining demand for reconnaissance that followed the internal disintegration of the Soviet Union. As a result of these events and improvements in technology, the unit cost of a Titan IV launch was very high. Additional expenses were generated by the ground operations and facilities for the Titan IV at Vandenberg Air Force Base for launching satellites into polar orbits. Titan IVs were also launched from the Cape Canaveral Air Force Station in Florida, a location often used for launch into non-polar orbits.

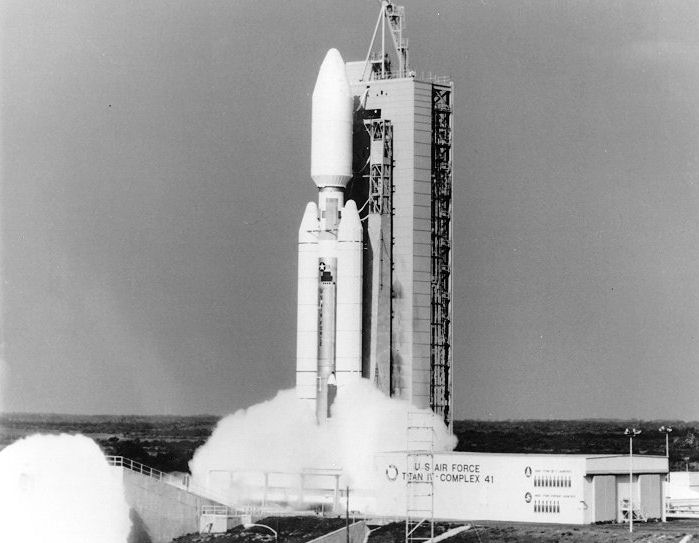
Titan IV-A

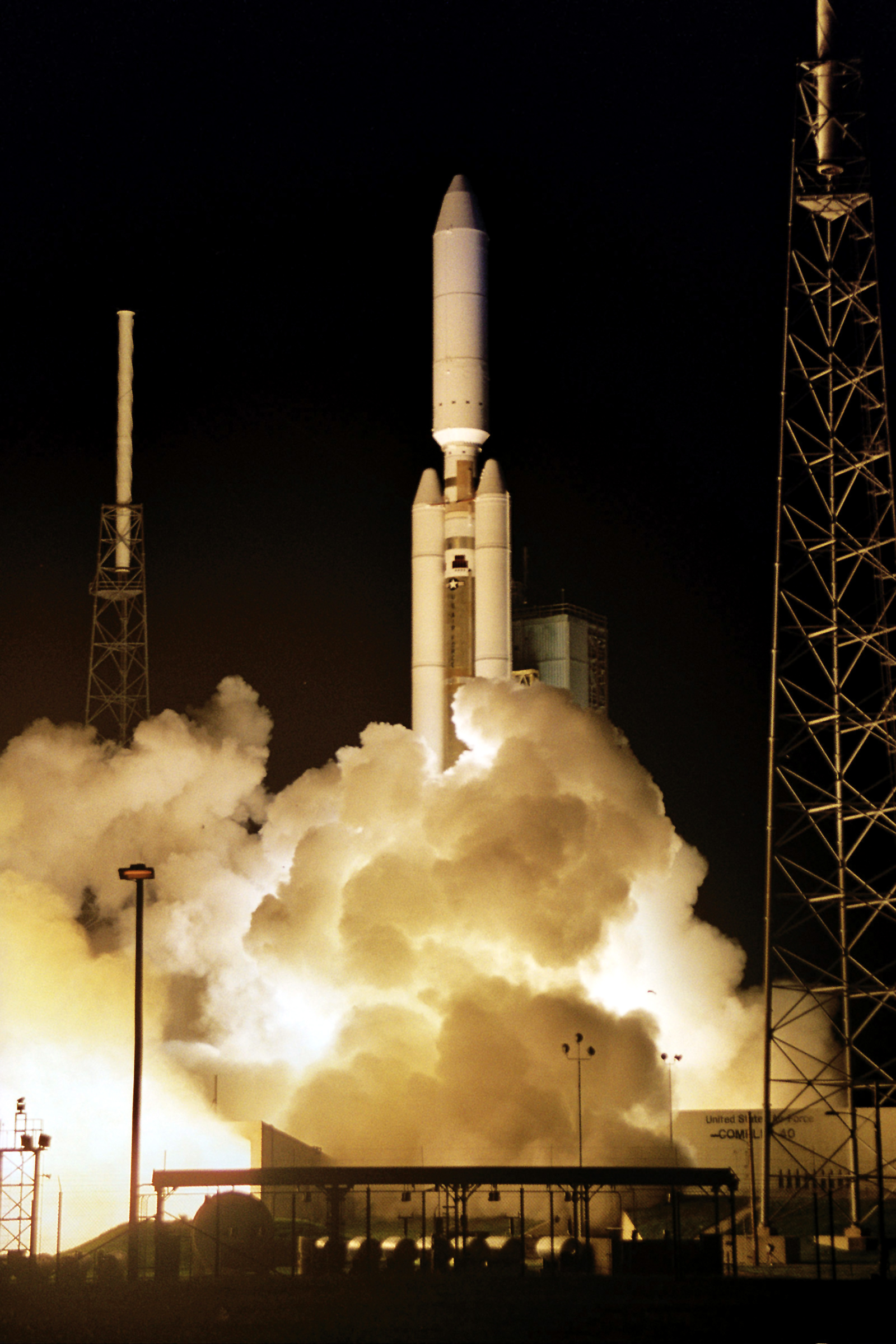
Titan IV-B

== Titan V concept ==
The Titan V was a proposed development of the Titan IV, that saw several designs being suggested. One Titan V proposal was for an enlarged Titan IV, capable of lifting up to 90,000 pounds (41,000 kg) of payload. Another used a cryogenic first stage with LOX/LH2 propellants; however the Atlas V EELV was selected for production instead.

== Launch vehicle retirement ==
Most of the decommissioned Titan II ICBMs were refurbished and used for Air Force space launch vehicles, with a perfect launch success record.

For orbital launches, there were strong advantages to using higher-performance liquid hydrogen or RP-1 fueled vehicles with liquid oxygen; the high cost of using hydrazine and nitrogen tetroxide, along with the special care that was needed due to their toxicity, were a further consideration. Lockheed Martin decided to extend its Atlas family of rockets instead of its more expensive Titans, along with participating in joint-ventures to sell launches on the Russian Proton rocket and the new Boeing-built Delta IV class of medium and heavy-lift launch vehicles. The Titan IVB was the last Titan rocket to remain in service, making its penultimate launch from Cape Canaveral on 30 April 2005, followed by its final launch from Vandenberg Air Force Base on 19 October 2005, carrying the USA-186 optical imaging satellite for the National Reconnaissance Office.

== See also ==
- Titan Missile Museum
- List of Titan launches
- Comparison of orbital launchers families
- Comparison of orbital launch systems
- Titan site 374-7 explosion
