= Aerozine 50 =

Storable hypergolic rocket fuel

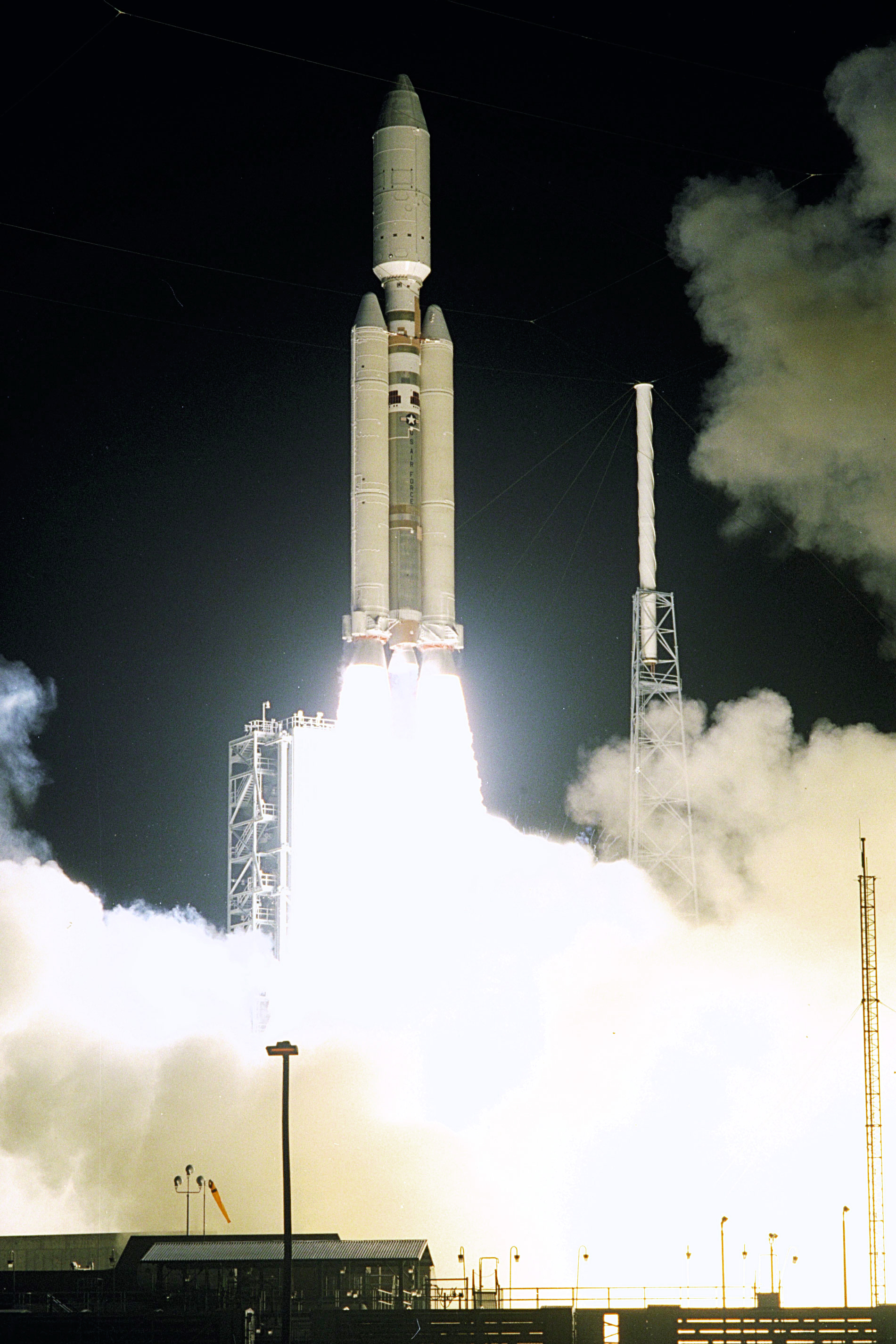

Aerozine 50 is a 50:50 mix by weight of hydrazine and unsymmetrical dimethylhydrazine (UDMH), developed in the late 1950s by Aerojet General Corporation as a storable, high-energy, hypergolic fuel for the Titan II ICBM rocket engines. Aerozine continues in wide use as a rocket fuel, typically with dinitrogen tetroxide (N_{2}O_{4}) as the oxidizer, with which it is hypergolic. Aerozine 50 is more stable than hydrazine alone, and has a higher density and boiling point than UDMH alone.

Pure hydrazine has a higher performance than Aerozine 50, but an inconvenient freezing point of 2 °C. A mix of hydrazine and UDMH has a far lower freezing point due to freezing-point depression. In addition, UDMH is a more stable molecule; this reduces the risk of pure hydrazine decomposing unexpectedly, increasing safety and allowing the blend to be used as a coolant in regeneratively cooled engines.

This type of fuel is mainly used for interplanetary probes and spacecraft propulsion. Unlike other more common propellants like liquid oxygen or liquid hydrogen, Aerozine 50 is liquid at room temperature and can be stored in liquid state without significant boil off, thus making it a storable propellant better suited for long-term interplanetary missions. Aerozine 50 was largely used in ICBMs and in their derivative launchers such as the core stages of the Titan-II/III/IV rocket because an ICBM requires long-term storage and launch on short notice; the rocket must be stored already fueled. This fuel was also used in ICBM-derived upper stages, such as the Delta II rocket. It was also used by the Apollo Lunar Module and the Service Propulsion System engine in the Apollo CSM. The Ariane 1 through Ariane 4 family used a related fuel, a mixture of 75% UDMH and 25% hydrazine hydrate called UH 25.

Aerozine is not used as a monopropellant (a propellant that is not mixed with anything). The extra stability conferred by the methyl groups affects reactivity and thrust.

In 1980, an accidental leakage of Aerozine 50 resulted in the 1980 Damascus Titan missile explosion. The leak occurred due to puncture of the first-stage Titan fuel tank by a dropped tool. The initial explosion removed the 740-ton silo door and ejected the second stage and warhead out of the silo. The Titan's second stage exploded, and the W53 warhead landed 30 meters from the silo portal without detonating or leaking fissile material.

== Alternatives ==
Hydrazine may also be mixed with monomethyl hydrazine (MMH). Because MMH is slightly denser, net performance is increased slightly.

With 2-Dimethylaminoethylazide, a potentially novel hypergolic alternative compound has been developed based on tertiary amine azides called CINCH (Competitive Impulse Non-Carcinogenic Hypergol).

== Trivia ==
According to John D. Clark, the propellant community disliked and ignored brandnames such as Aerojet's Aerozine, preferring its own jargon of engineering acronyms and nicknames. This particular mixture was called "50–50".

== See also ==
- UH 25 – a mixture of 75% UDMH and 25% hydrazine.
