= List of Titan launches =

This is a list of launches made by the LGM-25 Titan ICBMs, and their derivatives.

== Launch statistics ==
Rockets from the Titan family accumulated 368 launches between 1959 and 2005, 322 of which were successful, yielding a 87.5% success rate.

- Failure
- Partial failure
- Success

== Launches ==
Date/Time (GMT)	Configuration	Serial Numbers					Launch site	Trajectory	Result	Payload	Remarks
=== 1959 ===
6 February; 21:22	Titan I	A-3					CCAFS LC-15	Suborbital	Success		First flight of Titan I, Battleship second stage
25 February; 19:45	Titan I	A-5					CCAFS LC-15	Suborbital	Success		Battleship second stage
3 April; 17:11	Titan I	A-4					CCAFS LC-15	Suborbital	Success		Battleship second stage
4 May; 18:30	Titan I	A-6					CCAFS LC-15	Suborbital	Success		Battleship second stage
14 August; 16:00	Titan I	B-5					CCAFS LC-19	Suborbital	Failure		Premature umbilical release caused a shutdown command to be sent at T+5 seconds. Missile fell back onto the pad and exploded.
12 December; 17:11	Titan I	C-3					CCAFS LC-16	Suborbital	Failure	RVX-3	Vibration accidentally set off the RSO destruct charges at liftoff.
=== 1960 ===
2 February; 18:08	Titan I	B-7A					CCAFS LC-19	Suborbital	Success		
5 February; 21:46	Titan I	C-4					CCAFS LC-16	Suborbital	Failure	RVX-3	Guidance compartment collapsed at T+52 seconds. Missile destroyed itself T+56 seconds.
24 February	Titan I	G-4					CCAFS LC-15	Suborbital	Success	RVX-4	
8 March; 18:00	Titan I	C-1					CCAFS LC-16	Suborbital	Failure	RVX-3	Second stage failed to start. Stuck valve prevented operation of the gas generator.
22 March	Titan I	G-5					CCAFS LC-15	Suborbital	Success	RVX-4	
8 April	Titan I	C-5					CCAFS LC-16	Suborbital	Success	RVX-3	
21 April; 20:55	Titan I	G-6					CCAFS LC-15	Suborbital	Success	RVX-4	
28 April; 20:18	Titan I	C-6					CCAFS LC-16	Suborbital	Success	RVX-3	
13 May; 21:25	Titan I	G-7					CCAFS LC-15	Suborbital	Success	RVX-4	
27 May; 17:20	Titan I	G-9					CCAFS LC-16	Suborbital	Success	RVX-4	
24 June	Titan I	G-10					CCAFS LC-15	Suborbital	Success	RVX-4	
1 July; 17:29	Titan I	J-2					CCAFS LC-20	Suborbital	Failure	Mk.4 REV	Broken hydraulic line led to loss of control. RSO T+11 seconds.
28 July; 21:38	Titan I	J-4					CCAFS LC-20	Suborbital	Failure	Mk.4 REV	Premature first stage shutdown. LOX valve accidentally closed, terminating thrust.
10 August; 22:46	Titan I	J-7					CCAFS LC-19	Suborbital	Success	Mk.4 REV	
30 August	Titan I	J-5					CCAFS LC-20	Suborbital	Success	Mk.4 REV	
28 September	Titan I	J-8					CCAFS LC-19	Suborbital	Success	Mk.4 REV	
29 September; 14:20	Titan I	G-8					CCAFS LC-15	Suborbital	Success	RVX-4	
7 October; 15:50	Titan I	J-3					CCAFS LC-20	Suborbital	Success	Mk.4 REV	
24 October; 23:16	Titan I	J-6					CCAFS LC-19	Suborbital	Success	Mk.4 REV	
4 December; 05:35	Titan I	V-2					VAFB OSTF	Suborbital	Failure	Mk.4 REV	Silo elevator collapsed. Missile fell back into the silo and exploded.
20 December	Titan I	J-9					CCAFS LC-20	Suborbital	Failure	Mk.4 REV	Second stage gas generator failed to start.
=== 1961 ===
20 January; 20:53	Titan I	AJ-10					CCAFS LC-19	Suborbital	Failure	Mk.4 REV	Improper disconnect of a pad umbilical prevented second stage ignition.
10 February; 05:55	Titan I	AJ-11					CCAFS LC-20	Suborbital	Success	Mk.4 REV	
20 February	Titan I	AJ-13					CCAFS LC-19	Suborbital	Success	Mk.4 REV	
3 March	Titan I	AJ-12					CCAFS LC-20	Suborbital	Failure	Mk.4 REV	Second stage turbopump failure
28 March	Titan I	AJ-14					CCAFS LC-19	Suborbital	Success	Mk.4 REV	
31 March; 19:42	Titan I	AJ-15					CCAFS LC-20	Suborbital	Failure	Mk.4 REV	First stage turbopump failure
3 May	Titan I	VS-1					VAFB SLTF	Suborbital	Success		Missile intentionally destroyed at T+180 seconds as a test of the range safety system.
23 May	Titan I	AJ-16					CCAFS LC-20	Suborbital	Success	Mk.4 REV	
24 June; 03:28	Titan I	M-1					CCAFS LC-19	Suborbital	Failure	Mk.4 REV	Second stage hydraulics failure.
21 July; 02:00	Titan I	AJ-18					CCAFS LC-20	Suborbital	Success	Mk.4 REV	
25 July; 19:05	Titan I	M-2					CCAFS LC-19	Suborbital	Success	Mk.4 REV	
4 August	Titan I	AJ-19					CCAFS LC-20	Suborbital	Success	Mk.4 REV	
7 September; 01:30	Titan I	AJ-17					CCAFS LC-20	Suborbital	Success	Mk.4 REV	
8 September; 19:05	Titan I	M-3					CCAFS LC-19	Suborbital	Success	Mk.4 REV	
23 September; 20:36	Titan I	SM-2					VAFB LC-395-A1	Suborbital	Partial failure		Premature first stage cutoff resulted in early second stage start and burn until LOX depletion.
29 September; 01:52	Titan I	AJ-20					CCAFS LC-20	Suborbital	Success	Mk.4 REV	
7 October; 01:30	Titan I	M-4					CCAFS LC-19	Suborbital	Success	Mk.4 REV	Titan II guidance test
24 October; 23:28	Titan I	AJ-21					CCAFS LC-20	Suborbital	Success	Mk.4 REV	
22 November; 00:30	Titan I	AJ-22					CCAFS LC-20	Suborbital	Success	Mk.4 REV	
29 November; 19:05	Titan I	M-5					CCAFS LC-19	Suborbital	Success	Mk.4 REV	
13 December	Titan I	AJ-23					CCAFS LC-20	Suborbital	Success	Mk.4 REV	
15 December	Titan I	M-6					CCAFS LC-19	Suborbital	Failure	Mk.4 REV	Electrical malfunction prevented second stage start
=== 1962 ===
21 January; 00:57	Titan I	SM-4					VAFB LC-395-A3	Suborbital	Failure		Second stage yaw actuator malfunctioned at liftoff, causing the stage to tumble at separation and fail to start.
29 January; 23:30	Titan I	M-7					CCAFS LC-19	Suborbital	Success	Mk.4 REV	
23 February	Titan I	SM-18					VAFB LC-395-A1	Suborbital	Success		
16 March; 18:09	Titan II	N-2					CCAFS LC-16	Suborbital	Success	Mk.6 REV	First flight of Titan II
4 May; 21:43	Titan I	SM-34					VAFB LC-395-A1	Suborbital	Success		
7 June; 18:21	Titan II	N-1					CCAFS LC-15	Suborbital	Success	Mk.6 REV	
11 July; 18:51	Titan II	N-6					CCAFS LC-15	Suborbital	Success	Mk.6 REV	
25 July; 16:17	Titan II	N-4					CCAFS LC-16	Suborbital	Success	Mk.6 REV	
12 September; 15:50	Titan II	N-5					CCAFS LC-15	Suborbital	Success	Mk.6 REV	
6 October	Titan I	SM-35					VAFB LC-395-A1	Suborbital	Success		
12 October; 16:24	Titan II	N-9					CCAFS LC-16	Suborbital	Success	Mk.6 REV	
26 October; 17:05	Titan II	N-12					CCAFS LC-15	Suborbital	Success	Mk.6 REV	
5 December	Titan I	SM-11					VAFB LC-395-A1	Suborbital	Success		
6 December; 20:31	Titan II	N-11					CCAFS LC-16	Suborbital	Failure	Mk.4 REV	Pogo oscillation reduction experiment failed and caused premature first stage shutdown from vibration
19 December; 20:08	Titan II	N-13					CCAFS LC-15	Suborbital	Success	Mk.6 REV	
=== 1963 ===
10 January	Titan II	N-15					CCAFS LC-16	Suborbital	Failure	Mk.6 REV	Second stage developed low thrust and landed well short of its intended impact point
29 January	Titan I	SM-8					VAFB LC-395-A1	Suborbital	Success		
6 February; 17:59	Titan II	N-16					CCAFS LC-15	Suborbital	Success	Mk.6 REV	
16 February; 21:45	Titan II	N-7					VAFB LC-395-C	Suborbital	Failure	Mk.6 REV	Design flaw caused the silo umbilicals to rip wiring out of the missile at liftoff, cutting power to the guidance system and causing complete loss of control. The malfunction prevented the range safety destruct charges from working, but the backup destruct system activated at T+30 seconds. "Awful Tired"
21 March; 15:23	Titan II	N-18					CCAFS LC-15	Suborbital	Success	Mk.6 REV	
30 March; 08:45	Titan I	SM-3					VAFB LC-395-A2	Suborbital	Success	NTMP K-17	
5 April	Titan I	V-1					VAFB LC-395-A1	Suborbital	Success		
13 April	Titan I	SM-1					VAFB LC-395-A3	Suborbital	Success	NTMP K-21	
19 April	Titan II	N-21					CCAFS LC-15	Suborbital	Success		
27 April	Titan II	N-8					VAFB LC-395-C	Suborbital	Success	Mk.6 REV	"Dinner Party"
1 May; 10:15	Titan I	V-4					VAFB LC-395-A1	Suborbital	Failure		Stuck engine valve caused the missile to tip over at liftoff and explode on impact with the ground
9 May	Titan II	N-14					CCAFS LC-16	Suborbital	Success	Mk.6 REV	
13 May	Titan II	N-19					VAFB LC-395-D	Suborbital	Success	Mk.6 REV	"Flying Frog"
24 May; 17:33	Titan II	N-17					CCAFS LC-15	Suborbital	Success	Mk.6 REV	
29 May; 16:56	Titan II	N-20					CCAFS LC-16	Suborbital	Failure	Mk.6 REV	Pogo oscillation reduction experiment. Fuel valve leak caused a thrust section fire and loss of control. Missile self-destructed at T+52 seconds.
20 June	Titan II	N-22					VAFB LC-395-C	Suborbital	Success	Mk.6 REV	"Thread Needle"
16 July	Titan I	SM-24					VAFB LC-395-A2	Suborbital	Success		
15 August	Titan I	SM-7					VAFB LC-395-A1	Suborbital	Success		
21 August; 23:23	Titan II	N-24					CCAFS LC-15	Suborbital	Success	Pod T-202	Gemini Malfunction Detection System test
30 August	Titan I	SM-56					VAFB LC-395-A3	Suborbital	Success		
17 September	Titan I	SM-83					VAFB LC-395-A2	Suborbital	Success		
23 September	Titan II	N-23					VAFB LC-395-D	Suborbital	Success	Mk.6 REV	"Tar Top"
1 November; 20:15	Titan II	N-25					CCAFS LC-15	Suborbital	Success	Pod T	Pogo oscillation reduction experiment Gemini Malfunction Detection System test
9 November	Titan II	N-27					VAFB LC-395-C	Suborbital	Success		
14 November	Titan I	SM-68					VAFB LC-395-A1	Suborbital	Success		
12 December; 20:00	Titan II	N-29					CCAFS LC-15	Suborbital	Success	Pod T	Pogo oscillation reduction experiment Gemini Malfunction Detection System test
17 December	Titan II	N-28					VAFB LC-395-D	Suborbital	Success	Pod T	
=== 1964 ===
15 January	Titan II	N-31					CCAFS LC-15	Suborbital	Success	Pod T	Pogo oscillation reduction experiment Gemini Malfunction Detection System test
23 January	Titan II	N-26					VAFB LC-395-C	Suborbital	Success		
17 February; 16:15	Titan II	B-15					VAFB LC-395-B	Suborbital	Success		
26 February; 20:15	Titan II	N-32					CCAFS LC-15	Suborbital	Success		
13 March	Titan II	N-30					VAFB LC-395-C	Suborbital	Success		
24 March; 01:42	Titan II	N-33					CCAFS LC-15	Suborbital	Success	Pod T-207	Gemini Malfunction Detection System test
6 April; 16:00:01	Titan II GLV	GT-1					CCAFS LC-19	LEO	Success	Gemini 1	First Gemini launch, first orbital Titan launch
9 April; 20:00	Titan II	N-3A					CCAFS LC-15	Suborbital	Success		
30 July	Titan II	B-28					VAFB LC-395-D	Suborbital	Success		"Cobra Skin"
11 August	Titan II	B-9					VAFB LC-395-D	Suborbital	Success		"Double Talley"
13 August	Titan II	B-7					VAFB LC-395-D	Suborbital	Success		"Gentle Annie"
1 September; 15:00:06	Titan IIIA	3A-2			TS-1		CCAFS LC-20	Planned: LEO	Failure		First flight of Titan III, Transtage failed to pressurise
2 October	Titan II	B-1					VAFB LC-395-C	Suborbital	Success		"Black Widow"
4 November; 17:00	Titan II	B-32					VAFB LC-395-D	Suborbital	Success		"High Rider"
8 December	Titan I	SM-85					VAFB LC-395-A1	Suborbital	Success		"ST West Wind I"
10 December; 16:52:33	Titan IIIA	3A-1			TS-2		CCAFS LC-20	LEO	Success		
=== 1965 ===
14 January; 12:00	Titan I	SM-33					VAFB LC-395-A3	Suborbital	Success		"ST West Wind III"
19 January; 14:04:00	Titan II GLV	GT-2					CCAFS LC-19	Suborbital	Success	Gemini 2	
11 February; 15:19:05	Titan IIIA	3A-3					CCAFS LC-20	LEO	Success	LES-1	
5 March	Titan I	SM-80					VAFB LC-395-A3	Suborbital	Success		"ST West Wind II", final flight of Titan I
23 March; 14:24:00	Titan II GLV	GT-3					CCAFS LC-19	LEO	Success	Gemini 3	First crewed Titan launch
25 March; 02:15	Titan II	B-60					VAFB LC-395-B	Suborbital	Success		"Arctic Sun"
16 April; 19:19	Titan II	B-45					VAFB LC-395-C	Suborbital	Success		"Bear Hug"
30 April; 19:05	Titan II	B-54					VAFB LC-395-D	Suborbital	Failure		"Card Deck"First stage engines shut down T+100 seconds due to loss of turbopump lubricant
6 May; 15:00:03	Titan IIIA	3A-6					CCAFS LC-20	LEO	Success	LES-2; LCS-1	Final flight of Titan IIIA
21 May; 23:53	Titan II	B-51					VAFB LC-395-B	Suborbital	Success		"Front Sight"
3 June; 15:16:00	Titan II GLV	GT-4					CCAFS LC-19	LEO	Success	Gemini 4	Crewed flight
14 June; 13:31	Titan II	B-22					VAFB LC-395-C	Suborbital	Partial failure		"Gold Fish"One vernier engine failed, warhead missed target
18 June; 14:00:04	Titan IIIC	3C-7			TS-5		CCAFS LC-40	LEO	Success		First flight of Titan IIIC
30 June; 14:29	Titan II	B-30					VAFB LC-395-D	Suborbital	Success		"Busy Bee"
21 July; 18:18	Titan II	B-62					VAFB LC-395-B	Suborbital	Success		"Long Ball"
16 August; 20:04	Titan II	B-6					VAFB LC-395-C	Suborbital	Success		"Magic Lamp"
21 August; 14:00:00	Titan II GLV	GT-5					CCAFS LC-19	LEO	Success	Gemini 5 REP	Crewed flight
26 August; 00:04	Titan II	B-19					VAFB LC-395-D	Suborbital	Success		"New Role"
21 September; 14:04	Titan II	B-58					VAFB LC-395-B	Suborbital	Failure		"Bold Guy" Electrical short in guidance computer results in premature second stage cutoff. Planned range not achieved.
15 October; 17:23:59	Titan IIIC	3C-4					CCAFS LC-40	LEO	Failure	LCS-2; OV2-1	Transtage disintegrated
20 October; 18:09	Titan II	B-33					VAFB LC-395-C	Suborbital	Success		"Power Box"
27 November; 10:00	Titan II	B-20					VAFB LC-395-D	Suborbital	Success		"Red Wagon"
30 November; 14:44	Titan II	B-4					VAFB LC-395-B	Suborbital	Failure		"Cross Fire" Second stage fuel leak results in loss of control
4 December; 19:30:04	Titan II GLV	GT-7					CCAFS LC-19	LEO	Success	Gemini 7	Crewed flight
15 December; 13:37:26	Titan II GLV	GT-6					CCAFS LC-19	LEO	Success	Gemini 6A	Crewed flight
21 December; 14:00:01	Titan IIIC	3C-8					CCAFS LC-41	GTO (intended); HEO (achieved)	Partial failure	LES-4; LES-3; OV2-3; OSCAR 4	Third burn of the Transtage failed, and payloads failed to achieve GTO. OV2-3 failed to separate from the Transtage.
22 December; 14:10	Titan II	B-73					VAFB LC-395-C	Suborbital	Success		"Sea Rover"
=== 1966 ===
3 February; 11:11	Titan II	B-87					VAFB LC-395-D	Suborbital	Success		"Winter Ice"
17 February; 09:45	Titan II	B-61					VAFB LC-395-B	Suborbital	Success		"Black Hawk"
16 March; 16:41:02	Titan II GLV	GT-8					CCAFS LC-19	LEO	Success	Gemini 8	Crewed flight
25 March; 09:42	Titan II	B-16					VAFB LC-395-C	Suborbital	Success		"Close Touch"
5 April; 16:20	Titan II	B-50					VAFB LC-395-D	Suborbital	Success		"Gold Ring"
20 April; 08:44	Titan II	B-55					VAFB LC-395-B	Suborbital	Success		"Long Light"
24 May	Titan II	B-91					VAFB LC-395-C	Suborbital	Partial failure		"Silver Bullet"RV separation signal received, but not utilized.
3 June; 13:39:33	Titan II GLV	GT-9					CCAFS LC-19	LEO	Success	Gemini 9A	Crewed flight
16 June; 14:00:01	Titan IIIC	3C-11					CCAFS LC-41	Sub-GSO	Success	OPS-9311 (IDCSP); OPS-9312 (IDCSP); OPS-9313 (IDCSP); OPS-9314 (IDCSP); OPS-9315 (IDCSP); OPS-9316 (IDCSP); OPS-9317 (IDCSP); GGTS-1	
18 July; 22:20:27	Titan II GLV	GT-10					CCAFS LC-19	LEO	Success	Gemini 10	Crewed flight
22 July	Titan II	B-95					VAFB LC-395-B	Suborbital	Success		"Giant Train"
29 July; 18:43	Titan IIIB	3B-1			4751		VAFB SLC-4W	LEO	Success	OPS-3014 (KH-8)	First flight of Titan IIIB
26 August; 13:59:56	Titan IIIC	3C-12					CCAFS LC-41	Planned: Sub-GSO	Failure	7 x IDCSP; GGTS-2	Payload fairing disintegrated at T+78 seconds. ISDS destroyed vehicle T+83 seconds.
12 September; 14:42:27	Titan II-GLV	GT-11					CCAFS LC-19	LEO	Success	Gemini 11	Crewed flight
16 September	Titan II	B-40					VAFB LC-395-C	Suborbital	Success		"Black River"
28 September; 19:12	Titan IIIB	3B-2					VAFB SLC-4W	LEO	Success	OPS-4096 (KH-8)	
3 November; 13:50:42	Titan IIIC	3C-9					CCAFS LC-40	LEO	Success	Gemini B OV4-3; OV4-1R/T	Manned Orbiting Laboratory boilerplate Gemini B released on suborbital trajectory
11 November; 20:46:33	Titan II-GLV	GT-12					CCAFS LC-19	LEO	Success	Gemini 12	Final Crewed Titan flight
24 November; 10:00	Titan II	B-68					VAFB LC-395-B	Suborbital	Success		"Bubble Girl"
14 December; 18:14	Titan IIIB	3B-3					VAFB SLC-4W	LEO	Success	OPS-8968 (KH-8)	
=== 1967 ===
18 January; 14:19	Titan IIIC	3C-13					CCAFS LC-41	Sub-GSO	Success	OPS-9321 (IDCSP); OPS-9322 (IDCSP); OPS-9323 (IDCSP); OPS-9324 (IDCSP); OPS-9325 (IDCSP); OPS-9326 (IDCSP); OPS-9327 (IDCSP); OPS-9328 (IDCSP)	
24 February; 19:55	Titan IIIB	3B-4					VAFB SLC-4W	LEO	Success	OPS-4204 (KH-8)	
17 March	Titan II	B-76					VAFB LC-395-C	Suborbital	Success		"Gift Horse"
12 April	Titan II	B-81					VAFB LC-395-B	Suborbital	Failure		"Glamour Girl"Second stage yaw gyro short results in loss of control
26 April; 18:00	Titan IIIB	3B-5					VAFB SLC-4W	Planned: LEO	Failure	OPS-4243 (KH-8)	Second stage lost thrust due to probable fuel line obstruction. Vehicle impacted the Pacific Ocean 600 miles downrange.
28 April; 10:01	Titan IIIC	3C-10					CCAFS LC-41	HEO	Success	OPS-6638 (Vela); OPS-6679 (Vela); ORS-4; OV5-1; OV5-3	
20 June; 16:19	Titan IIIB	3B-8					VAFB SLC-4W	LEO	Success	OPS-4282 (KH-8)	
23 June	Titan II	B-70					VAFB LC-395-B	Suborbital	Success		"Buggy Wheel"
1 July; 13:15	Titan IIIC	3C-14					CCAFS LC-41	Sub-GSO	Success	OPS-9331 (IDCSP); OPS-9332 (IDCSP); OPS-9333 (IDCSP); OPS-9334 (IDCSP); LES-5; DODGE	
16 August; 17:02	Titan IIIB	3B-9					VAFB SLC-4W	LEO	Success	OPS-4886 (KH-8)	
11 September	Titan II	B-21					VAFB LC-395-B	Suborbital	Success		"Glowing Bright"
19 September; 18:28	Titan IIIB	3B-10					VAFB SLC-4W	LEO	Success	OPS-4941 (KH-8)	
25 October; 19:15	Titan IIIB	3B-11					VAFB SLC-4W	LEO	Success	OPS-4995 (KH-8)	
5 December; 18:45	Titan IIIB	3B-12					VAFB SLC-4W	LEO	Success	OPS-5000 (KH-8)	
=== 1968 ===
18 January; 19:04	Titan IIIB	3B-13					VAFB SLC-4W	LEO	Success	OPS-5028 (KH-8)	
28 February; 15:00	Titan II	B-88					VAFB LC-395-B	Suborbital	Success		"Glory Trip 04T" Follow-on Test and Evaluation launch
13 March; 19:55	Titan IIIB	3B-14					VAFB SLC-4W	LEO	Success	OPS-5057 (KH-8)	
2 April	Titan II	B-36					Vandenberg AFB Launch Complex 395-C	Suborbital	Success		"Glory Trip 10T" Follow-on Test and Evaluation
7 April; 17:00	Titan IIIB	3B-15					VAFB SLC-4W	LEO	Success	OPS-5105 (KH-8)	
5 June; 17:31	Titan IIIB	3B-16					VAFB SLC-4W	LEO	Success	OPS-5138 (KH-8)	
12 June	Titan II	B-82					Vandenberg AFB Launch Complex 395-C	Suborbital	Success		"Glory Trip 08T" Follow-on Test and Evaluation launch
13 June; 14:03	Titan IIIC	3C-16					CCAFS LC-41	Sub-GSO	Success	OPS-9341 (IDCSP); OPS-9342 (IDCSP); OPS-9343 (IDCSP); OPS-9344 (IDCSP); OPS-9345 (IDCSP); OPS-9346 (IDCSP); OPS-9347 (IDCSP); OPS-9348 (IDCSP)	
6 August; 16:33	Titan IIIB	3B-17					VAFB SLC-4W	LEO	Success	OPS-5187 (KH-8)	
21 August	Titan II	B-53					VAFB LC-395-C	Suborbital	Success		"Glory Trip 18T" Follow-on Test and Evaluation launch
10 September; 18:30	Titan IIIB	3B-18					VAFB SLC-4W	LEO	Success	OPS-5247 (KH-8)	
26 September; 07:37	Titan IIIC	3C-5					CCAFS LC-41	GSO	Success	LES-6; OV2-5; OV5-2; OV5-4	
6 November; 19:10	Titan IIIB	3B-19					VAFB SLC-4W	LEO	Success	OPS-5296 (KH-8)	
19 November	Titan II	B-3					VAFB LC-395-C	Suborbital	Success		"Glory Trip 23T" Follow-on Test and Evaluation
4 December; 19:23	Titan IIIB	3B-20					VAFB SLC-4W	LEO	Success	OPS-6518 (KH-8)	
=== 1969 ===
22 January; 19:10	Titan IIIB	3B-6					VAFB SLC-4W	LEO	Success	OPS-7585 (KH-8)	
9 February; 21:09	Titan IIIC	3C-17					CCAFS LC-41	GSO	Success	OPS-0757 (Tacsat)	
4 March; 19:30	Titan IIIB	3B-7					VAFB SLC-4W	LEO	Success	OPS-4248 (KH-8)	
15 April; 17:30	Titan IIIB	3B-21					VAFB SLC-4W	LEO	Success	OPS-5310 (KH-8)	
20 May	Titan II	B-83					VAFB LC-395-B	Suborbital	Success		"Glory Trip 39T" Follow-on Test and Evaluation
23 May; 07:57	Titan IIIC	3C-15					CCAFS LC-41	HEO	Success	OPS-6909 (Vela); OPS-6911 (Vela); OV5-5; OV5-6; OV5-9	
3 June; 16:49	Titan IIIB	3B-22					VAFB SLC-4W	LEO	Success	OPS-1077 (KH-8)	
23 August; 16:00	Titan III(23)B	23B-1		3B-23			VAFB SLC-4W	LEO	Success	OPS-7807 (KH-8A)	First flight of Titan 23B
14 October; 18:10	Titan III(23)B	23B-2		3B-24			VAFB SLC-4W	LEO	Success	OPS-8455 (KH-8A)	
=== 1970 ===
14 January; 18:43	Titan III(23)B	23B-3		3B-24			VAFB SLC-4W	LEO	Success	OPS-6531 (KH-8A)	
8 April; 10:50	Titan IIIC	3C-18					CCAFS LC-40	HEO	Success	OPS-7033 (Vela); OPS-7044 (Vela)	
15 April; 15:52	Titan III(23)B	23B-4		3B-26			VAFB SLC-4W	LEO	Success	OPS-2863 (KH-8A)	
25 June; 14:50	Titan III(23)B	23B-5		3B-27			VAFB SLC-4W	LEO	Success	OPS-6820 (KH-8A)	
18 August; 14:45	Titan III(23)B	23B-6		3B-28			VAFB SLC-4W	LEO	Success	OPS-7874 (KH-8A)	
23 October; 17:40	Titan III(23)B	23B-7		3B-29			VAFB SLC-4W	LEO	Success	OPS-7568 (KH-8A)	
6 November; 10:35	Titan III(23)C	23C-1		3C-19			CCAFS LC-40	Planned: GSO; Actual: Sub-GSO	Partial failure	OPS-5960 (IMEWS)	First flight of Titan 23C, reached lower orbit than planned
=== 1971 ===
21 January; 18:28	Titan III(23)B	23B-8		3B-30			VAFB SLC-4W	LEO	Success	OPS-7776 (KH-8A)	
21 March; 03:45	Titan III(33)B	33B-1		3B-36			VAFB SLC-4W	Molniya	Success	OPS-4788 (Jumpseat)	First flight of Titan 33B
22 April; 15:30	Titan III(23)B	23B-9		3B-31			VAFB SLC-4W	LEO	Success	OPS-7899 (KH-8A)	Final flight of Titan 23B
5 May; 07:43	Titan III(23)C	23C-2		3C-20			CCAFS LC-40	GSO	Success	OPS-3811 (IMEWS)	
15 June; 18:41	Titan III(23)D	23D-1					VAFB SLC-4E	LEO	Success	OPS-8709 (KH-9)	First flight of Titan IIID
20 June; 22:45	Titan II	B-12					VAFB LC-395-C	Suborbital	Success	SSTTP M1-17	
12 August; 15:30	Titan III(24)B	24B-1		3B-32			VAFB SLC-4W	LEO	Success	OPS-8607 (KH-8A)	First flight of Titan 24B
28 August; 02:22	Titan II	B-100					VAFB LC-395-C	Suborbital	Success	SSTTP M2-1	
23 October; 17:16	Titan III(24)B	24B-2		3B-33			VAFB SLC-4W	LEO	Success	OPS-7616 (KH-8A)	
3 November; 03:09	Titan III(23)C	23C-3		3C-21			CCAFS LC-40	GSO	Success	OPS-9431 (DSCS-II); OPS-9432 (DSCS-II)	
=== 1972 ===
20 January; 18:36	Titan III(23)D	23D-2					VAFB SLC-4E	LEO	Success	OPS-1737 (KH-9); SSF-B-22	
16 February; 09:59	Titan III(33)B	33B-2		3B-37			VAFB SLC-4W	Planned: Molniya	Failure	OPS-1844 (Jumpseat)	Failed to reach orbit
1 March; 09:39	Titan III(23)C	23C-4		3C-22			CCAFS LC-40	GSO	Success	OPS-1570 (IMEWS)	
17 March; 17:00	Titan III(24)B	24B-3		3B-34			VAFB SLC-4W	LEO	Success	OPS-1678 (KH-8A)	
20 May; 15:30	Titan III(24)B	24B-4		3B-35			VAFB SLC-4W	Planned: LEO	Failure	OPS-6574 (KH-8A)	Agena pressurization failure
24 May; 23:45	Titan II	B-46					VAFB LC-395-C	Suborbital	Success	SSTTP M2-10	
7 July; 17:46	Titan III(23)D	23D-5					VAFB SLC-4E	LEO	Success	OPS-7293 (KH-9); SSF-B-23	
1 September; 17:44	Titan III(24)B	24B-5		3B-39			VAFB SLC-4W	LEO	Success	OPS-8888 (KH-8A)	
10 October; 18:03	Titan III(23)D	23D-3					VAFB SLC-4E	LEO	Success	OPS-8314 (KH-9); SSF-C-3	
11 October; 11:30	Titan II	B-78					VAFB LC-395-C	Suborbital	Success	SSTTP M2-14	
21 December; 17:45	Titan III(24)B	24B-6		3B-40			VAFB SLC-4W	LEO	Success	OPS-3978 (KH-8A)	
=== 1973 ===
9 March; 21:00	Titan III(23)D	23D-6					VAFB SLC-4E	LEO	Success	OPS-8410 (KH-9)	
16 May; 16:40	Titan III(24)B	24B-7		3B-41			VAFB SLC-4W	LEO	Success	OPS-2093 (KH-8A)	
12 June; 07:14	Titan III(23)C	23C-6		3C-24			CCAFS LC-40	GSO	Success	OPS-6157 (IMEWS)	
26 June; 17:00	Titan III(24)B	24B-9		3B-43			VAFB SLC-4W	LEO	Failure	OPS-4018 (KH-8A)	Agena fuel valve failure
13 July; 20:24	Titan III(23)D	23D-7					VAFB SLC-4E	LEO	Success	OPS-8261 (KH-9)	
21 August; 16:07	Titan III(33)B	33B-3		3B-38			VAFB SLC-4W	Molniya	Success	OPS-7724 (Jumpseat)	Final flight of Titan 33B
27 September; 17:15	Titan III(24)B	24B-8		3B-42			VAFB SLC-4W	LEO	Success	OPS-6275 (KH-8A)	
6 October	Titan II	B-69					VAFB LC-395-C	Suborbital	Success	SSTTP M2-27	
10 November; 20:09	Titan III(23)D	23D-8					VAFB SLC-4E	LEO	Success	OPS-6630 (KH-9); SSF-B-24; SSF-C-4	
13 December; 23:57	Titan III(23)C	23C-8		3C-26			CCAFS LC-40	GSO	Success	OPS-9433 (DSCS-II); OPS-9434 (DSCS-II)	
=== 1974 ===
11 February; 13:48	Titan III(23)E	23E-1			TC-1		CCAFS LC-41	Planned: Sub-GSO	Failure	Sphinx; Viking-DS	First flight of Titan IIIE. Centaur LOX turbopump malfunction. RSO T+525 seconds.
13 February; 18:00	Titan III(24)B	24B-10		3B-44			VAFB SLC-4W	LEO	Success	OPS-6889 (KH-8A)	
1 March	Titan II	B-85					VAFB LC-395-C	Suborbital	Success	SSTTP M2-31	
10 April; 20:20	Titan III(23)D	23D-9					VAFB SLC-4E	LEO	Success	OPS-6245 (KH-9); SSF-B-25; IRCB	
30 May; 13:00	Titan III(23)C	23C-9		3C-27			CCAFS LC-40	GSO	Success	ATS-6	
6 June; 16:30	Titan III(24)B	24B-11		3B-45			VAFB SLC-4W	LEO	Success	OPS-1776 (KH-8A)	
14 August; 15:35	Titan III(24)B	24B-12		3B-46			VAFB SLC-4W	LEO	Success	OPS-3004 (KH-8A)	
29 October; 19:30	Titan III(23)D	23D-4					VAFB SLC-4E	LEO	Success	OPS-7122 (KH-9); OPS-8452 (S3); SSF-B-26	
10 December; 07:11	Titan III(23)E/Star-37E	23E-2			TC-2		CCAFS LC-41	Heliocentric	Success	Helios-1	Probe targeted to examine the Sun; first probe to fly inside the orbit of Mercury
=== 1975 ===
10 January; 02:27	Titan II	B-27					VAFB LC-395-C	Suborbital	Success	SOFT-1	
10 March; 04:41	Titan III(34)B	34B-1		3B-50			VAFB SLC-4W	Molniya	Success	OPS-2439 (Jumpseat)	First flight of Titan 34B
18 April; 16:48	Titan III(24)B	24B-14		3B-48			VAFB SLC-4W	LEO	Success	OPS-4883 (KH-8A)	
20 May; 14:03	Titan III(23)C	23C-7		3C-25			CCAFS LC-40	Planned: GSO; Actual: LEO	Failure	OPS-9435 (DSCS-II); OPS-9436 (DSCS-II)	Transtage gyroscope malfunction
8 June; 18:30	Titan III(23)D	23D-10					VAFB SLC-4E	LEO	Success	OPS-6381 (KH-9); SSF-C-5	
7 August	Titan II	B-52					VAFB LC-395-C	Suborbital	Success	DG-2	
20 August; 21:22	Titan III(23)E	23E-4			TC-4		CCAFS LC-41	Heliocentric	Success	Viking 1	Mars orbiter and lander; lander arrived at Chryse Planitia on July 20, 1976.
9 September; 18:39	Titan III(23)E	23E-3			TC-3		CCAFS LC-41	Heliocentric	Success	Viking 2	Mars orbiter and lander; lander arrived at Utopia Planitia on September 3, 1976.
9 October; 19:15	Titan III(24)B	24B-13		3B-47			VAFB SLC-4W	LEO	Success	OPS-5499 (KH-8A)	
4 December; 20:38	Titan III(23)D	23D-13					VAFB SLC-4E	LEO	Success	OPS-4428 (KH-9); OPS-5547 (S3)	
4 December	Titan II	B-41					VAFB LC-395-C	Suborbital	Success	DG-4	
14 December; 05:15	Titan III(23)C	23C-11		3C-29			CCAFS LC-40	GSO	Success	OPS-3165 (DSP)	
=== 1976 ===
15 January; 05:34	Titan III(23)E/Star-37E	23E-5			TC-5		CCAFS LC-41	Heliocentric	Success	Helios-2	Probe targeted to examine the Sun; achieved highest velocity of any man-made object, 252,792 km/h (157,078 mph) relative to the Sun.
15 March; 01:25	Titan III(23)C	23C-12		3C-30			CCAFS LC-40	GSO	Success	LES-8; LES-9; Solrad 11A; Solrad 11B	
22 March; 18:14	Titan III(24)B	24B-18		3B-52			VAFB SLC-4W	LEO	Success	OPS-7600 (KH-8A)	
2 June; 20:56	Titan III(34)B	34B-5		3B-55			VAFB SLC-4W	Molniya	Success	OPS-7837 (SDS)	
26 June; 03:00	Titan III(23)C	23C-10		3C-28			CCAFS LC-40	GSO	Success	OPS-2112 (DSP)	
28 June; 02:40	Titan II	B-17					VAFB LC-395-C	Suborbital	Success	ITF-1	"Rivet Hawk", final flight of Titan ICBM, carried prototype Titan 23G guidance system
8 July; 18:30	Titan III(23)D	23D-14					VAFB SLC-4E	LEO	Success	OPS-4699 (KH-9); OPS-3986 (S3); SSF-D-1	
6 August; 22:21	Titan III(34)B	34B-6		3B-56			VAFB SLC-4W	Molniya	Success	OPS-7940 (SDS)	
15 September; 18:50	Titan III(24)B	24B-17		3B-51			VAFB SLC-4W	LEO	Success	OPS-8533 (KH-8A)	
19 December; 18:19	Titan III(23)D	23D-15					VAFB SLC-4E	LEO	Success	OPS-5705 (KH-11)	
=== 1977 ===
6 February; 06:00	Titan III(23)C	23C-5		3C-23			CCAFS LC-40	GSO	Success	OPS-3151 (DSP)	
13 March; 18:41	Titan III(24)B	24B-19		3B-54			VAFB SLC-4W	LEO	Success	OPS-4915 (KH-8A)	
12 May; 14:26	Titan III(23)C	23C-14		3C-32			CCAFS LC-40	GSO	Success	OPS-9437 (DSCS-II); OPS-9438 (DSCS-II)	
27 June; 18:30	Titan III(23)D	23D-17					VAFB SLC-4E	LEO	Success	OPS-4800 (KH-9)	
20 August; 14:29	Titan III(23)E	23E-7			TC-7		CCAFS LC-41	Heliocentric	Success	Voyager 2	Probe targeted at Jupiter, Saturn, Uranus and Neptune; completed Planetary Grand Tour; Solar System escape velocity achieved on Jupiter fly-by
5 September; 12:56	Titan III(23)E	23E-6			TC-6		CCAFS LC-41	Heliocentric	Success	Voyager 1	Final flight of Titan IIIE; Probe targeted at Jupiter, Saturn, and Titan (moon); Solar System escape velocity achieved on Jupiter fly-by First man-made object to leave the Solar System; now furthest man-made object from the Sun
23 September; 18:34	Titan III(24)B	24B-23		3B-58			VAFB SLC-4W	LEO	Success	OPS-7471 (KH-8A)	
=== 1978 ===
25 February; 05:00	Titan III(34)B	34B-2		3B-49			VAFB SLC-4W	Molniya	Success	OPS-6031 (Jumpseat)	
16 March; 18:43	Titan III(23)D	23D-20					VAFB SLC-4E	LEO	Success	OPS-0460 (KH-9); SSF-D-2	
25 March; 18:09	Titan III(23)C	23C-17		3C-35			CCAFS LC-40	Planned: GSO	Failure	OPS-9439 (DSCS-II); OPS-9440 (DSCS-II)	Second stage hydraulic malfunction. RSO destruct.
10 June; 19:12	Titan III(23)C	23C-15		3C-33			CCAFS LC-40	HEO	Success	OPS-9454 (Chalet)	
14 June; 18:28	Titan III(23)D	23D-18					VAFB SLC-4E	LEO	Success	OPS-4515 (KH-11)	
5 August; 05:00	Titan III(34)B	34B-7		3B-57			VAFB SLC-4W	Molniya	Success	OPS-7310 (SDS)	
14 December; 00:43	Titan III(23)C	23C-18		3C-36			CCAFS LC-40	GSO	Success	OPS-9441 (DSCS-II); OPS-9442 (DSCS-II)	
=== 1979 ===
16 March; 18:30	Titan III(23)D	23D-21					VAFB SLC-4E	LEO	Success	OPS-3854 (KH-9); SSF-D-3	
28 May; 18:14	Titan III(24)B	24B-25		3B-61			VAFB SLC-4W	LEO	Success	OPS-7164 (KH-8A)	
10 June; 13:39	Titan III(23)C	23C-13		3C-31			CCAFS LC-40	GSO	Success	OPS-7484 (DSP)	
1 October; 11:22	Titan III(23)C	23C-16		3C-34			CCAFS LC-40	HEO	Success	OPS-1948 (Chalet)	
21 November; 21:36	Titan III(23)C	23C-19		3C-37			CCAFS LC-40	GSO	Success	OPS-9443 (DSCS-II); OPS-9444 (DSCS-II)	
=== 1980 ===
7 February; 21:10	Titan III(23)D	23D-19					VAFB SLC-4E	LEO	Success	OPS-2581 (KH-11)	
18 June; 18:29	Titan III(23)D	23D-16					VAFB SLC-4E	LEO	Success	OPS-3123 (KH-9); SSF-C-6	
13 December; 16:04	Titan III(34)B	34B-3		3B-53			VAFB SLC-4W	Molniya	Success	OPS-5805 (SDS)	
=== 1981 ===
28 February; 19:15	Titan III(24)B	24B-24		3B-59			VAFB SLC-4W	LEO	Success	OPS-1166 (KH-8A)	
16 March; 19:24	Titan III(23)C	23C-22		3C-40			CCAFS LC-40	GSO	Success	OPS-7350 (DSP)	
24 April; 21:32	Titan III(34)B	34B-8		3B-60			VAFB SLC-4W	Molniya	Partial failure	OPS-7225 (Jumpseat)	Spacecraft failed to separate
3 September; 18:29	Titan III(23)D	23D-22					VAFB SLC-4E	LEO	Success	OPS-3984 (KH-11)	
31 October; 09:22	Titan III(23)C	23C-21		3C-39			CCAFS LC-40	HEO	Success	OPS-4029 (Chalet)	
=== 1982 ===
21 January; 19:36	Titan III(24)B	24B-26		3B-62			VAFB SLC-4W	LEO	Success	OPS-2849 (KH-8A HB)	
6 March; 19:25	Titan III(23)C	23C-20		3C-38			CCAFS LC-40	GSO	Success	OPS-8701 (DSP)	Final flight of Titan IIIC
11 May; 18:45	Titan III(23)D	23D-24					VAFB SLC-4E	LEO	Success	OPS-5642 (KH-9); SSF-D-4	
30 October; 04:05	Titan 34D/IUS	4D-5		34D-1			CCAFS LC-40	GSO	Success	OPS-9446 (DSCS-II); OPS-6451 DSCS III-A1	First flight of Titan 34D
17 November; 21:22	Titan III(23)D	23D-23					VAFB SLC-4E	LEO	Success	OPS-9627 (KH-11)	Final flight of Titan IIID
=== 1983 ===
15 April; 18:45	Titan III(24)B	24B-27		3B-63			VAFB SLC-4W	LEO	Success	OPS-2925 (KH-8A)	
20 June; 18:45	Titan 34D	4D-3			34D-5		VAFB SLC-4E	LEO	Success	OPS-0721 (KH-9); SSF-C-7	
31 July; 15:41	Titan III(34)B	34B-9		3B-65			VAFB SLC-4W	Molniya	Success	OPS-7304 (Jumpseat)	
=== 1984 ===
31 January; 03:08	Titan 34D/Transtage	5D-1		34D-10			CCAFS LC-40	HEO	Success	OPS-0441 (Vortex)	
14 April; 16:52	Titan 34D/Transtage	5D-2		34D-11			CCAFS LC-40	GSO	Success	OPS-7641 (DSP)	
17 April; 18:45	Titan III(24)B	24B-28		3B-67			VAFB SLC-4W	LEO	Success	OPS-8424 (KH-8A)	Final flight of Titan 24B
25 June; 18:43	Titan 34D	4D-1			34D-4		VAFB SLC-4E	LEO	Success	USA-2 (KH-9); USA-3 (SSF-D)	
28 August; 18:03	Titan III(34)B	34B-4		3B-64			VAFB SLC-4W	Molniya	Success	USA-4 (SDS)	
4 December; 18:00	Titan 34D	4D-4			34D-6		VAFB SLC-4E	LEO	Success	USA-6 (KH-11)	
22 December; 00:02	Titan 34D/Transtage	5D-3		34D-13			CCAFS LC-40	GSO	Success	USA-7 (DSP)	
=== 1985 ===
8 February; 06:10	Titan III(34)B	34B-10		3B-69			VAFB SLC-4W	Molniya	Success	USA-9 (SDS)	
28 August; 21:20	Titan 34D	4D-6			34D-7		VAFB SLC-4E	Planned: LEO	Failure	KH-11	First stage oxidizer leak led to turbopump failure and premature shutdown. RSO T+272 seconds.
=== 1986 ===
18 April; 17:45	Titan 34D	4D-2			34D-9		VAFB SLC-4E	Planned: LEO	Failure	KH-9	SRM burn-through. Vehicle exploded 8 seconds after liftoff. Last KH-9 Hexagon satellite
=== 1987 ===
12 February; 06:40	Titan III(34)B	34B-51		3B-66			VAFB SLC-4W	Molniya	Success	USA-21 (SDS)	Final flight of Titan IIIB; Final use of Agena upper stage in any vehicle
26 October; 21:32	Titan 34D	4D-8			34D-15		VAFB SLC-4E	LEO	Success	USA-27 (KH-11)	
29 November; 03:28	Titan 34D/Transtage	5D-4		34D-8			CCAFS LC-40	GSO	Success	USA-28 (DSP)	
=== 1988 ===
2 September; 12:05	Titan 34D/Transtage	5D-5		34D-3			CCAFS LC-40	Planned: HEO; Actual: MEO	Failure	USA-31 (Vortex)	Transtage failed to repressurise
5 September; 09:25	Titan II(23)G	23G-1		B-56		B-98	VAFB SLC-4W	LEO	Success	USA-32 (Bernie)	First flight of Titan 23G
6 November; 18:03	Titan 34D	4D-7			34D-14		VAFB SLC-4E	LEO	Success	USA-33 (KH-11)	
=== 1989 ===
10 May; 19:47	Titan 34D/Transtage	5D-6		34D-16			CCAFS LC-40	HEO	Success	USA-37 (Vortex)	
14 June; 13:18	Titan IV(402)A	45D-1		4A-1	K-1	IUS-8	CCAFS LC-41	GSO	Success	USA-39 (DSP)	First flight of Titan IV. An engine bell burn-through left only a narrow margin for success.
4 September; 05:54	Titan 34D/Transtage	5D-7		34D-2			CCAFS LC-40	HEO	Success	USA-43 (DSCS-II); USA-44 (DSCS-III)	Final flight of Titan 34D; final use of the Transtage upper stage
6 September; 01:49	Titan II(23)G	23G-2		B-99		B-75	VAFB SLC-4W	LEO	Success	USA-45 (Bernie)	
=== 1990 ===
1 January; 00:07	Commercial Titan III	CT-1					CCAFS LC-40	LEO	Success	Skynet 4A; JCSAT-2	First flight of Commercial Titan III
14 March; 11:52	Commercial Titan III	CT-2					CCAFS LC-40	Planned: GTO; Actual: LEO	Partial failure	Intelsat 603	Second stage failed to separate from kick motor, upper stage jettison successfully commanded to save payload Spacecraft later recovered and reboosted by Space Shuttle Endeavour on mission STS-49
8 June; 05:22	Titan IV(405)A	45H-4		4A-4		K-4	CCAFS LC-41	LEO	Success	USA-59 (SLDCOM); USA-60 (NOSS); USA-61 (NOSS); USA-62 (NOSS)	First flight of Titan 405A
23 June; 11:19	Commercial Titan III	CT-3					CCAFS LC-40	LEO	Success	Intelsat 604	
13 November; 00:37	Titan IV(402)A	45D-2		4A-6	K-6	IUS-6	CCAFS LC-41	GSO	Success	USA-65 (DSP)	
=== 1991 ===
8 March; 12:03	Titan IV(403)A	45F-1		4A-5		K-5	VAFB SLC-4E	LEO	Success	USA-69 (Lacrosse)	First flight of Titan 403A
8 November; 07:07	Titan IV(403)A	45F-2		4A-8		K-8	VAFB SLC-4E	LEO	Success	USA-72 (SLDCOM); USA-74 (NOSS); USA-76 (NOSS); USA-77 (NOSS)	
=== 1992 ===
25 April; 08:53	Titan II(23)G	23G-3			B-102		VAFB SLC-4W	LEO	Success	USA-81 (Bernie)	
25 September; 17:05	Commercial Titan III/TOS	CT-4					CCAFS LC-40	Heliocentric	Success	Mars Observer	Final flight of Commercial Titan III
28 November; 21:34	Titan IV(404)A	45J-1		4A-3		K-3	VAFB SLC-4E	LEO	Success	USA-86 (KH-12)	First flight of Titan 404A
=== 1993 ===
2 August; 19:59	Titan IV(403)A	45F-9		4A-11		K-11	VAFB SLC-4E	Planned: LEO	Failure	SLDCOM; 3 x NOSS	SRM exploded due to damage caused during maintenance on ground
5 October; 17:56	Titan II(23)G/Star-37XFP	23G-5		B-65			VAFB SLC-4W	Planned: LEO	Failure	Landsat 6	Star-37 failed to ignite
=== 1994 ===
25 January; 16:34	Titan II(23)G	23G-11		B-67		B-89	VAFB SLC-4W	LEO	Success	Clementine; DSPSE-ISA	
7 February; 21:47	Titan IV(401)A	45E-3		4A-10	K-10	TC-12	CCAFS LC-40	GSO	Success	USA-99 (Milstar DFS-1)	First flight of Titan 401A
3 May; 15:55	Titan IV(401)A	45E-1		4A-7	K-7	TC-10	CCAFS LC-41	Molniya	Success	USA-103 (Trumpet)	
27 August; 08:58	Titan IV(401)A	45E-2		4A-9	K-9	TC-11	CCAFS LC-41	GSO	Success	USA-105 (Mercury)	
22 December; 22:19	Titan IV(402)A	45D-3		4A-14	K-14	IUS-20	CCAFS LC-40	GSO	Success	USA-65 (DSP)	Final flight of Titan 402A
=== 1995 ===
14 May; 13:45	Titan IV(401)A	45E-8		4A-23	K-23	TC-17	CCAFS LC-40	GSO	Success	USA-110 (Mentor)	
10 July; 12:38	Titan IV(401)A	45E-5		4A-19	K-19	TC-8	CCAFS LC-41	Molniya	Success	USA-112 (Trumpet)	
6 November; 05:15	Titan IV(401)A	45E-7		4A-21	K-21	TC-13	CCAFS LC-40	GSO	Success	USA-115 (Milstar DFS-2)	
5 December; 21:18	Titan IV(404)A	45J-3		4A-15		K-15	VAFB SLC-4E	LEO	Success	USA-116 (KH-12)	
=== 1996 ===
24 April; 23:37	Titan IV(401)A	45E-4		4A-16	K-16	TC-15	CCAFS LC-41	GSO	Success	USA-118 (Mercury)	
12 May; 21:32	Titan IV(403)A	45F-11		4A-22		K-22	VAFB SLC-4E	LEO	Success	USA-119 (SLDCOM); USA-120 (NOSS); USA-121 (NOSS); USA-122 (NOSS); USA-123 (TiPS); USA-124 (TiPS)	
3 July; 00:31	Titan IV(405)A	45H-1		4A-2		K-2	CCAFS LC-40	LEO	Success	USA-125 (SDS)	Final flight of Titan 405A
20 December; 18:04	Titan IV(404)A	45J-5		4A-13		K-13	VAFB SLC-4E	LEO	Success	USA-129 (KH-12)	NROL-2, final flight of Titan 404A
=== 1997 ===
23 February; 20:20	Titan IV(402)B	45D-4		4B-24	K-24	IUS-4	CCAFS LC-40	GSO	Success	USA-130 (DSP)	First flight of Titan IVB
4 April; 16:47	Titan II(23)G/Star-37S	23G-6		B-106			VAFB SLC-4W	LEO	Success	USA-131 (DMSP)	
15 October; 08:43	Titan IV(401)B	45E-13		4B-33	K-33	TC-21	CCAFS LC-40	Heliocentric	Success	Cassini; Huygens	First flight of Titan 401B
24 October; 02:32	Titan IV(403)A	45F-3		4A-18		K-18	VAFB SLC-4E	LEO	Success	USA-133 (Lacrosse)	NROL-3, final flight of Titan 403A
8 November; 02:05	Titan IV(401)A			4A-17	K-20	TC-16	CCAFS LC-41	Molniya	Success	USA-136 (Trumpet)	NROL-4
=== 1998 ===
9 May; 01:38	Titan IV(401)B			4B-25	K-25	TC-18	CCAFS SLC-40	GSO	Success	USA-139 (Mentor)	NROL-6
13 May; 15:52	Titan II(23)G/Star-37XFP	23G-12	B-72	B-80	B-84		VAFB SLC-4W	LEO	Success	NOAA-15	
12 August; 11:30	Titan IV(401)A			4A-20	K-17	TC-9	CCAFS SLC-41	Planned: GSO	Failure	NROL-7 (Mercury)	Final flight of Titan IV-A. Electrical short reset the guidance computer, resulting in an erroneous pitch down maneuver and vehicle breakup at T+40 seconds.
=== 1999 ===
9 April; 17:01	Titan IV(402)B			4B-27	K-32	IUS-21	CCAFS SLC-41	Planned: GSO; Actual: GTO	Failure	USA-142 (DSP)	IUS stage separation failure. Final flight of Titan from SLC-41 before being converted into an Atlas V launch facility.
30 April; 16:30	Titan IV(401)B			4B-32	K-26	TC-14	CCAFS SLC-40	Planned: GSO; Actual: MEO	Failure	USA-143 (Milstar DFS-3m)	Incorrectly programmed guidance computer caused loss of Centaur attitude control. Payload left in a useless orbit.
22 May; 09:36	Titan IV(404)B			4B-12		K-12	VAFB SLC-4E	LEO	Success	USA-144 (Misty)	NROL-9, first flight of Titan 404B
20 June; 02:15	Titan II(23)G	23G-7			B-75		VAFB SLC-4W	LEO	Success	QuickSCAT	
12 December; 17:38	Titan II(23)G/Star-37XFP	23G-8		B-44	B-94		VAFB SLC-4W	LEO	Success	USA-147 (DMSP)	
=== 2000 ===
8 May; 16:01	Titan IV(402)B			4B-29	K-29	IUS-22	CCAFS SLC-40	GSO	Success	USA-149 (DSP)	
17 August; 23:45	Titan IV(403)B			4B-28		K-25	VAFB SLC-4E	LEO	Success	USA-152 (Onyx)	NROL-11, first flight of Titan 403B
21 September; 10:22	Titan II(23)G/Star-37XFP	23G-13		B-39	B-96		VAFB SLC-4W	LEO	Success	NOAA-16	
=== 2001 ===
27 February; 21:20	Titan IV(401)B			4B-41	K-30	TC-22	CCAFS SLC-40	GSO	Success	USA-157 (Milstar DFS-4)	
6 August; 07:28	Titan IV(402)B			4B-31	K-31	IUS-16	CCAFS SLC-40	GSO	Success	USA-159 (DSP)	
5 October; 21:21	Titan IV(404)B			4B-34		K-34	VAFB SLC-4E	LEO	Success	USA-161 (KH-12)	NROL-14, first flight of Titan 404B
=== 2002 ===
16 January; 00:30	Titan IV(401)B			4B-38	K-35	TC-19	CCAFS SLC-40	GSO	Success	USA-164 (Milstar DFS-5)	
24 June; 18:23	Titan II(23)G/Star-37XFP	23G-14	B-72	B-92	B-71		VAFB SLC-4W	LEO	Success	NOAA-17	
=== 2003 ===
6 January; 14:19	Titan II(23)G	23G-4			B-72		VAFB SLC-4W	LEO	Success	Coriolis	
8 April; 13:43	Titan IV(401)B			4B-35		TC-23	CCAFS SLC-40	GSO	Success	USA-169 (Milstar DFS-6)	
9 September	Titan IV(401)B			4B-36		TC-20	CCAFS SLC-40	GSO	Success	USA-171 (Mentor)	NROL-19, final flight of Titan 401B
18 October; 16:17	Titan II(23)G/Star-37XFP	23G-9		B-107			VAFB SLC-4W	LEO	Success	USA-172 (DMSP)	Final flight of Titan II
=== 2004 ===
14 February; 18:50	Titan IV(402)B			4B-39	K-39	IUS-10	CCAFS SLC-40	GSO	Success	USA-176 (DSP)	Final flight of Titan 402B
=== 2005 ===
30 April; 00:50	Titan IV(403)B			4B-30			CCAFS SLC-40	LEO	Success	USA-182 (Onyx)	NROL-16, Final flight of Titan 403B
19 October; 18:05	Titan IV(404)B			4B-26		K-35	VAFB SLC-4E	LEO	Success	USA-186 (KH-12)	NROL-20, Final flight of Titan family

== See also ==
- List of Atlas launches
- List of Thor and Delta launches
