= USA-4 =

American reconnaissance satellite

- Operator: U.S. Air Force
- COSPAR ID: 1984-091A

Spacecraft properties
- Manufacturer: Lockheed Martin
- Launch mass: 700 kg (1,500 lb)
- Power: 980 W

Start of mission
- Launch date: 18:03 GMT, 28 August 1984
- Rocket: Titan III(34)B
- Launch site: Vandenberg, SLC-4W

Orbital parameters
- Periapsis altitude: 287 kilometres (178 mi)
- Apoapsis altitude: 38,156 kilometres (23,709 mi)
- Inclination: 63.60º
- Period: 702.80 min

USA-4 (BYEMAN codename QUASAR 5) was an American communication relay satellite carrying a Satellite Data System (SDS 5) payload operated by the National Reconnaissance Office and U.S. Air Force. The fifth of seven Quasar missions, it was launched on a Titan IIIB rocket from Vandenberg, SLC-4W in California on August 28, 1984.

== Overview ==
The QUASAR 5 satellite launched from what was then called the Air Force Western Test Range (AFWTR), now SLC-4W at Vandenberg SFB, for a launch cost of $25.8 million. The satellite was inserted into a highly elliptical 287 × 38,156 km orbit at an inclination of 63.3° (near-Molniya orbit). The apogee was set in the northern hemisphere.

The satellite was equipped with a Satellite Data System (SDS) payload developed by the US Air Force Space and Missile Systems Organization (SAMSO) and acted as a communication relay for transmitting real-time data from US reconnaissance satellites such as KH-9 Hexagon. It was also used for communications to US Air Force aircraft on polar routes. In 1984, the Permanent Representative of the US to the United Nations stated in a report that the spacecraft was engaged with "practical applications and uses of space technology such as weather or communications".

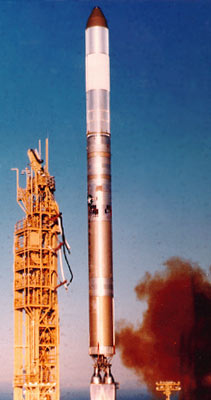
Titan-3(34)B Agena-D rocket launching from Vandenberg AFB

== See also ==
- List of USA satellites
