= Satellite Data System =

American military satellite communication system

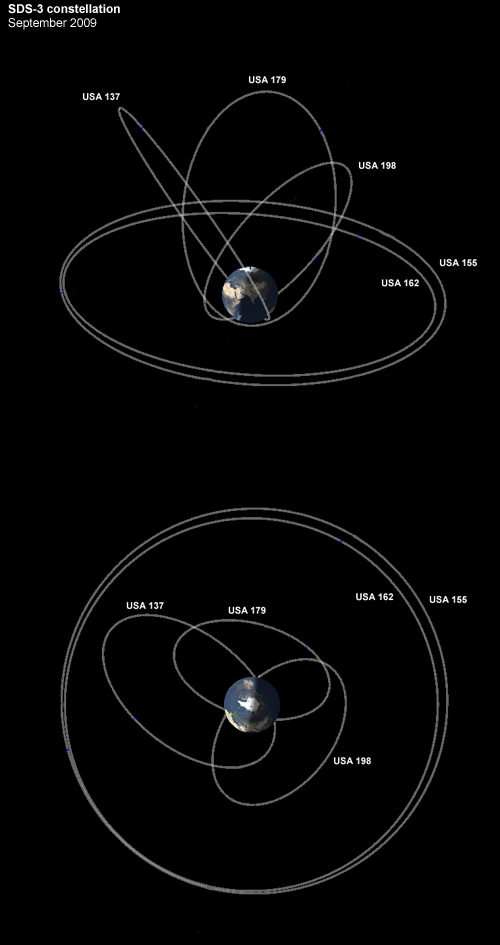
The current SDS-3 constellation, consisting of three Molniya orbit type and two geostationary satellites

The Satellite Data System (SDS) is a system of United States military communications satellites. At least three generations have been used: SDS-1 from 1976 to 1987; SDS-2 from 1989 to 1996; SDS-3 from 1998 to the present. It is believed that these satellites were known by the code name Quasar. The first generation was named simply 'SDS', the second generation was named 'Quasar' and the third generation each had their own designations.

== Orbital characteristics ==
SDS satellites have a highly elliptical orbit, going from about 300 kilometers at perigee to roughly 39,000 km at apogee in order to allow communications with polar stations that cannot contact geosynchronous satellites. The high apogee meant that the polar regions were visible for long amounts of time, and only two satellites were required in order to achieve constant communications ability. In addition, two geostationary satellites appear to be part of the system. The SDS satellites were constructed by Hughes Aircraft Company.

== Mission ==
The primary purpose of the SDS satellites is to relay imagery from low-flying reconnaissance satellites, notably the Keyhole optical reconnaissance and Lacrosse/Onyx radar reconnaissance satellites to ground stations in the United States.

== SDS-1 ==
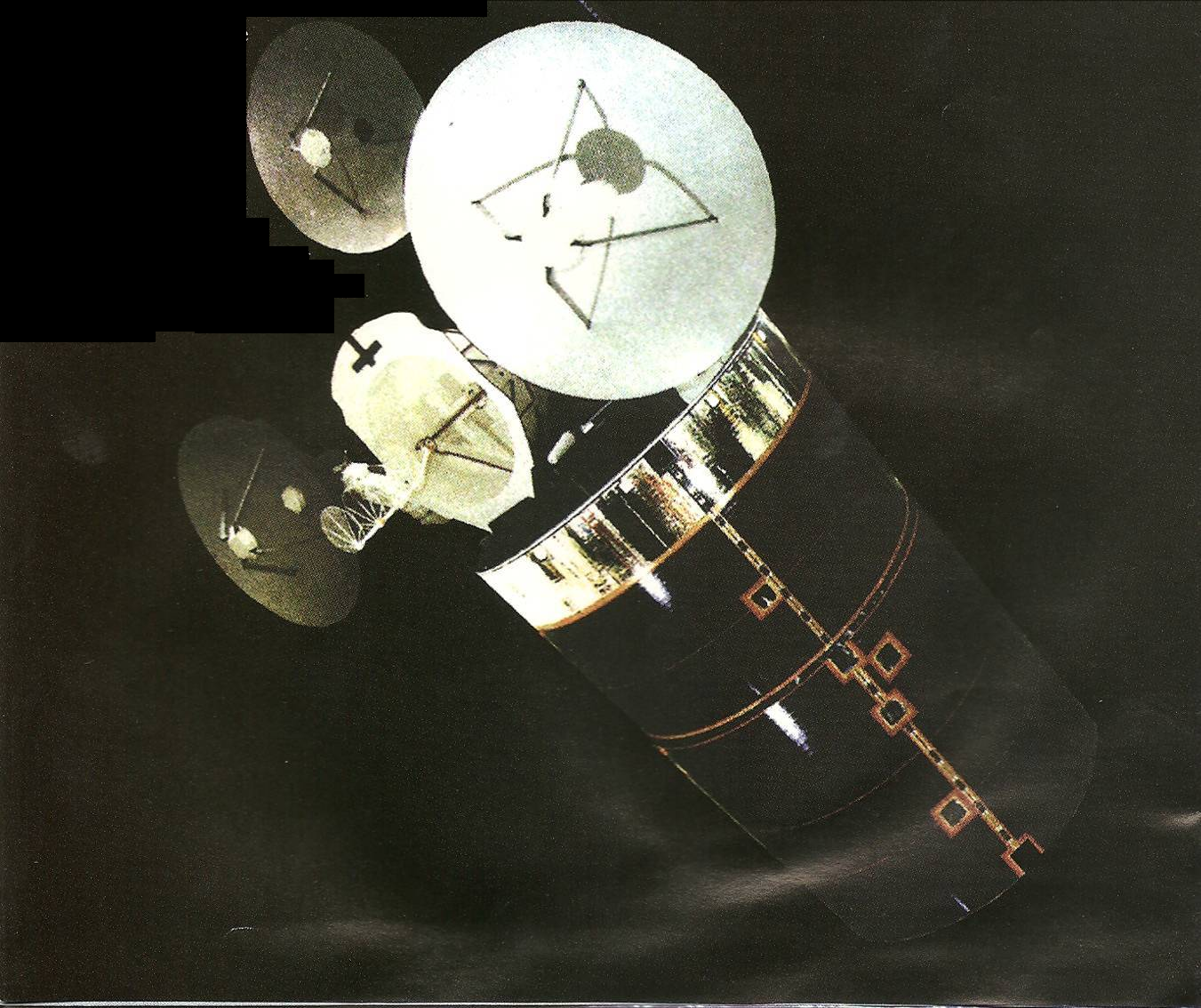
Releasable Picture of NRO satellite, possible SDS-1

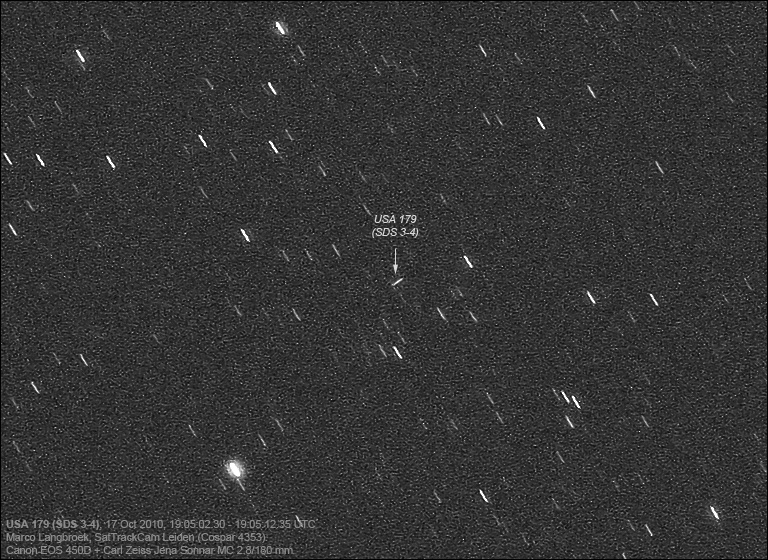
The SDS 3-4 satellite (USA 179, 2004-034A) created a tiny trail perpendicular to the star trails in this 10 second exposure with a Zeiss Sonnar MC 2.8/180mm lens made by amateur satellite observer Marco Langbroek.

Each SDS-1 satellite had 12 channels available for Ultra high frequency (UHF) communication. They were cylindrical in shape, roughly 25 ft (7.6 m) long. 980 watts of electrical power were available from solar panels and batteries. The SDS-1 had a mass of 630 kg (1,390 lb) and was launched on Titan-3B rockets. The SDS-1 satellites had similar orbits to the Air Force's Jumpseat ELINT satellites.

The partial declassification of JUMPSEAT in late 2025 revealed that USA-21, which had been previously attributed to SDS block 1, was the final JUMPSEAT launch.

It has been speculated that the early satellites served as data relays for the first KH-11 Kennen reconnaissance satellites.

== SDS-2 ==
The SDS-2 is significantly more massive at 2,335 kg (5,148 lb), with three separate communication dishes, including one for a K-band downlink. Two dishes are 4.5 m (15 ft) in diameter, while the third is 2 m (6 ft 7 in) in diameter. The solar arrays generate 1238 watts of power. It is believed that the Space Shuttle has been used to launch several satellites, possibly on missions STS-28, STS-38, and STS-53. Other launches have used the Titan IV launch vehicle.

== Satellites ==
Name	COSPAR ID SATCAT №	Launch date	Launch vehicle	Launch site	Launch designation	Perigee	Apogee	Inclination	Remarks
=== First generation ===
OPS 7837	1976-050A; 08871	2 June 1976	Titan III(34)B	VAFB, SLC-4W	SDS F-1	380 km	39315 km	63.3 deg	
OPS 7940	1976-080A; 09270	6 August 1976	Titan III(34)B	VAFB, SLC-4W	SDS F-2	380 km	39315 km	63.3 deg	
OPS 7310	1978-075A; 10993	5 August 1978	Titan III(34)B	VAFB, SLC-4W	SDS F-3	380 km	39315 km	63.3 deg	
OPS 5805	1980-100A; 12093	13 December 1980	Titan III(34)B	VAFB, SLC-4W					
USA-4	1984-091A; 15226	28 August 1984	Titan III(34)B	VAFB, SLC-4W	SDS F-5A				
USA-9	195-014A; 15546	8 February 1985	Titan III(34)B	VAFB, SLC-4W	USA-9				
=== Second generation ===
USA-40	1989-061B; 20167	2 June 1989	Space Shuttle Columbia; STS-28/Orbus-21S	KSC, LC-39B	N/A				
USA-67	1990-097B; 20963	15 November 1990	Space Shuttle Atlantis; STS-38/Orbus-21S	KSC, LC-39A	N/A				Geosynchronous satellite, deployed along with Prowler and initially misidentified as a Magnum SIGINT spacecraft
USA-89	1992-086B; 22518	2 December 1992	Space Shuttle Discovery; STS-53/Orbus-21S	KSC, LC-39A	N/A				
USA-125	1996-038A; 23945	3 July 1996	Titan IV(405)A	CCAFS, LC-40	N/A				
=== Third generation ===
USA-137	1998-005A; 25148	29 January 1998	Atlas IIA	CCAFS, SLC-36A	NROL-5				Capricorn, Molniya orbit
USA-155	2000-080A; 26635	6 December 2000	Atlas IIAS	CCAFS, SLC-36A	NROL-10				Great Bear, geosynchronous satellite at 10° West
USA-162	2001-046A; 26948	11 October 2001	Atlas IIAS	CCAFS, SLC-36B	NROL-12				Aquila, geosynchronous satellite at 144° West
USA-179	2004-034A; 28384	31 August 2004	Atlas IIAS	CCAFS, SLC-36A	NROL-1				Nemesis, Molniya orbit, final Atlas II launch
USA-198	2007-060A; 32378	10 December 2007	Atlas V 401	CCAFS, SLC-41	NROL-24				Scorpius, Molniya orbit
USA-227	2011-011A; 37377	11 March 2011	Delta IV-M+(4,2)	CCAFS, SLC-37B	NROL-27				Gryphon, geosynchronous satellite at 10° West, replaced USA-155
USA-236	2012-033A; 38466	20 June 2012	Atlas V 401	CCAFS, SLC-41	NROL-38				Drake, geosynchronous satellite at 144° West, replacement for USA-162
USA-252	2014-027A; 39751	22 May 2014	Atlas V 401	CCAFS, SLC-41	NROL-33				Geosynchronous satellite
USA-269	2016-047A; 41724	28 July 2016	Atlas V 421	CCAFS SLC-41	NROL-61				Spike, Geosynchronous orbit, might be a new generation
USA-279	2017-066A; 42973	15 October 2017	Atlas V 421	CCAFS, SLC-41	NROL-52				Likely Geosynchronous orbit
