= USA-198 =

American communications satellite

- Names: NROL-24; NRO Launch 24
- Operator: NRO
- COSPAR ID: 2007-060A
- SATCAT no.: 32378

Spacecraft properties
- Spacecraft type: SDS-3

Start of mission
- Launch date: 10 December 2007, 22:05:00 UTC
- Rocket: Atlas V (401)
- Launch site: Cape Canaveral, SLC-41

USA-198, known before launch as NRO Launch 24 (NROL-24), is an American communications satellite that was launched in 2007.

== Launch ==
United Launch Alliance (ULA) performed the launch of USA-198 using an Atlas V rocket in the 401 configuration from SLC-41 of the Cape Canaveral Space Force Station at 22:05 UTC on December 10, 2007.
