= Gravity Gradient Technology Satellite =

U.S. Gravity Gradient Satellite

Gravity Gradient Test Satellite (GGTS)
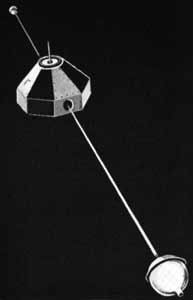
- Gravity Gradient Technology Satellite (GGTS)
- Mission type: Gravity-gradient stabilization
- Operator: United States Air Force
- COSPAR ID: 1966-053A
- SATCAT no.: 2207

Spacecraft properties
- Launch mass: 47 kilograms (104 lb)

Start of mission
- Launch date: June 16, 1966 14:00:01 UTC
- Rocket: Titan IIIC
- Launch site: Cape Canaveral LC41

Orbital parameters
- Reference system: Geocentric
- Regime: Geosynchronous
- Perigee altitude: 33,663 kilometers (20,917 mi)
- Apogee altitude: 33,858 kilometers (21,038 mi)
- Inclination: 4.2°
- Period: 1,334.00 minutes

The Gravity Gradient Test Satellite was launched by the US Air Force from Cape Canaveral LC41 aboard a Titan IIIC rocket on June 16, 1966, at 14:00:01 UTC. The satellite was launched along with seven IDCSP satellites, with which it shared a bus. In contrast to the solar-powered IDCSP satellites, GGTS was battery powered.

GGTS utilized the 26.4-pound (12.0 kg) Magnetically Anchored Gravity Systems (MACS), which consisted of two identical subsystem packages, each containing an extensible rod unit and a magnetically anchored spherical viscous damper. The rod units had an extended length of 15.8 meters (52 ft), and their 5-kilogram (11 lb) damper tip weights gave the satellite a symmetric dumbbell configuration. The dampers were produced by General Electric and consisted of two concentric spheres separated by a viscous damping fluid. The internal sphere contained a hollow cylindrical magnet which served to "anchor' the inner sphere to the Earth's magnetic field, stabilizing the satellite over time.

It had been hoped that within 60 days of launch, the satellite would reach a stabilization of ±8° on the x- and y-axis. The results were compromised, as one of the dampers was magnetically contaminated.

A follow-up GGTS mission was lost due to a launch vehicle failure on August 28, 1966.

== See also ==
- IDCSP
