= USA-229 =

Pair of signals intelligence satellites

- Names: NROL-34; NRO Launch 34; NOSS-3 5A and 5B; Intruder 9A and 9B
- Mission type: SIGINT
- Operator: United States NRO
- COSPAR ID: 2011-014A
- SATCAT no.: 37386 and 37391

Spacecraft properties
- Spacecraft: NOSS-3 5 (3rd Generation)
- Spacecraft type: Intruder
- Bus: NOSS-3
- Manufacturer: Lockheed Martin
- Launch mass: 3250 kg (each)

Start of mission
- Launch date: 15 April 2011, at 04:24 UTC
- Rocket: Atlas V 411 (AV-027)
- Launch site: Vandenberg, SLC-3E
- Contractor: ULA

Orbital parameters
- Reference system: Geocentric orbit
- Regime: Low Earth orbit
- Perigee altitude: 1015 km
- Apogee altitude: 1207 km
- Inclination: 63.46°

USA-229, known before launch as NRO Launch 34 (NROL-34), is a pair of American signals intelligence satellites which were launched in 2011. They are operated by the United States National Reconnaissance Office.

Both satellites were deployed by a United Launch Alliance Atlas V 411 launch vehicle, which launched from SLC-3E at the Vandenberg Air Force Base. The launch occurred at 04:24 UTC on 15 April 2011. The rocket placed the satellites into a low Earth orbit. By 04:29 UTC, official updates on the status of the spacecraft had been discontinued.

Whilst details of the satellites and their missions are officially classified, amateur observers have identified that the Atlas V deployed two satellites, one of which has officially been catalogued as debris. The two spacecraft have been identified as being a pair of third or fourth generation Naval Ocean Surveillance System satellites. Amateur observations have located the spacecraft in an orbit with a perigee of 1,015 kilometres (631 mi) and an apogee of 1,207 kilometres (750 mi), inclined at 63.46° to the plane of the equator. Current generation NOSS satellites are always launched and operated in pairs, and are used to locate and track ships and aircraft from the radio transmissions that they emit.
