= Jumpseat (satellite) =

Code name for class of satellites operated by the United States Air Force

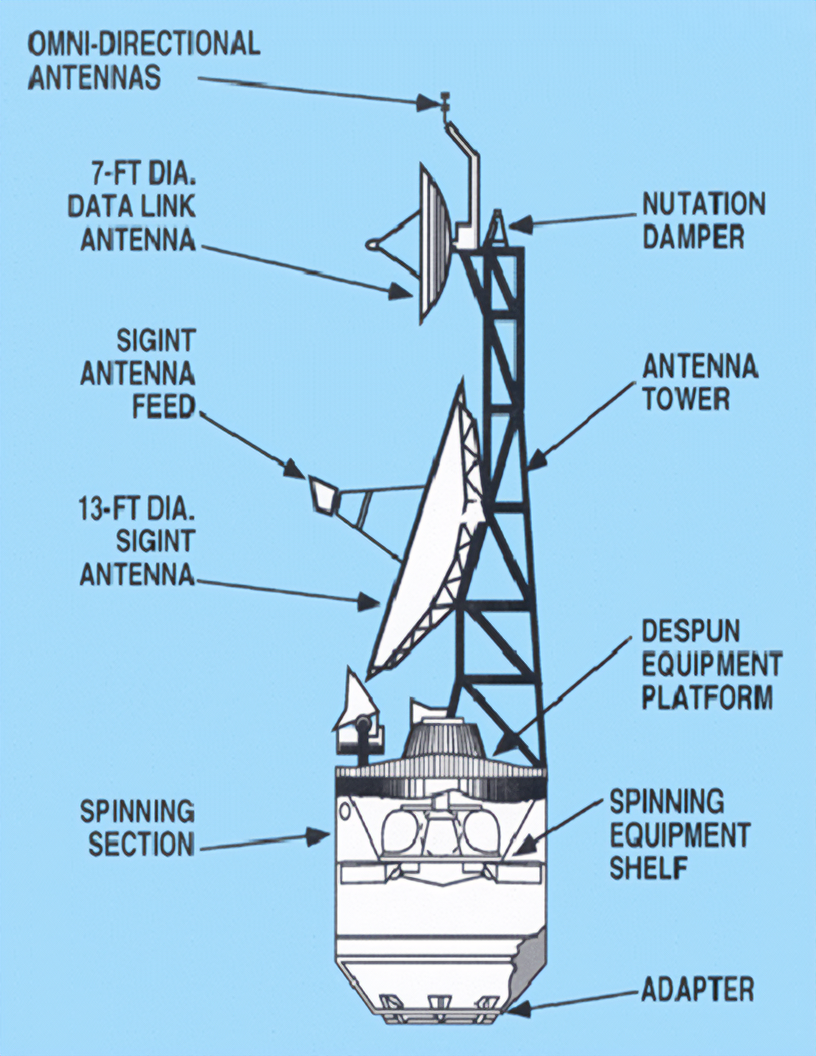
Diagram of an early JUMPSEAT SIGINT satellite with annotations

JUMPSEAT, also known as AFP-711 is a code name for a class of highly elliptical orbit SIGINT reconnaissance satellites operated by the National Reconnaissance Office for the United States Air Force in the 1970s and 1980s, and retired from use in 2006. These satellites were developed under Project EARPOP during the 1960s and early 1970s Some program details were declassified in December 2025.

== Satellites ==
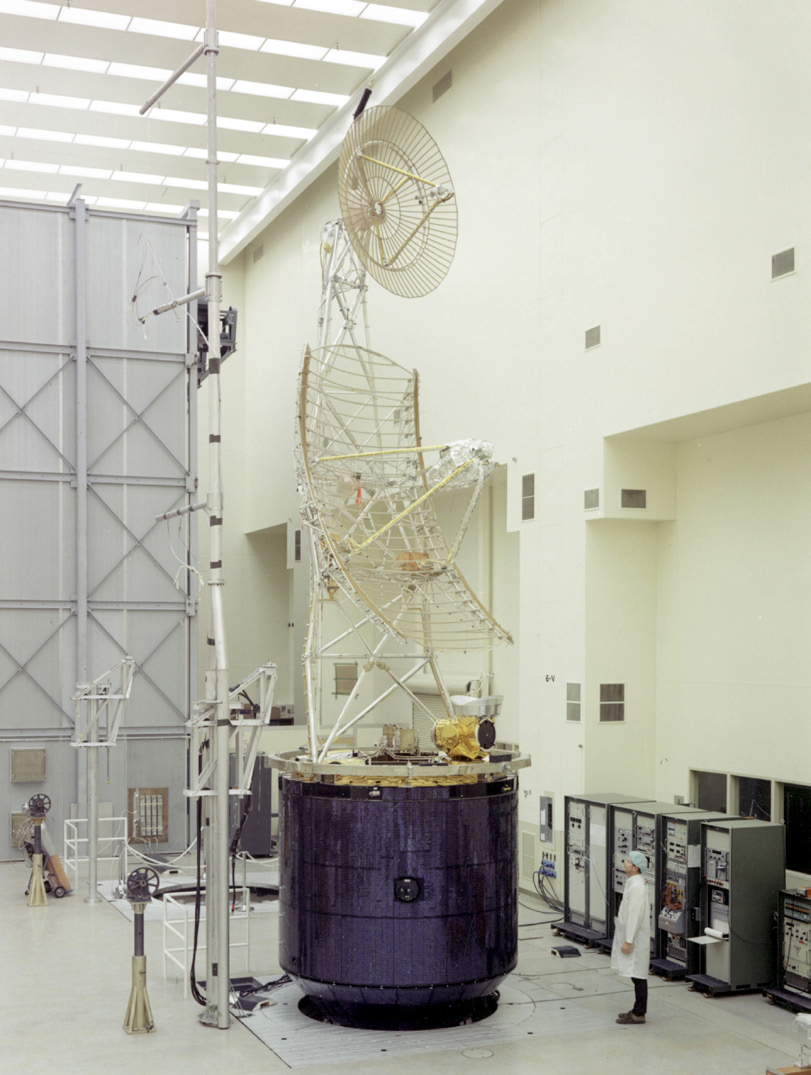
JUMPSEAT satellite construction

The JUMPSEAT satellites had the purpose of collecting electronic signals to provide information about adversarial countries weapon systems capabilities. This was a continuation of preexisting satellite constellations such as Grab or Poppy. Gathered data was downlinked to ground stations within the United States.

The 700 kilograms (1,500 lb) Jumpseat satellites were manufactured by Hughes Aircraft and were inserted into highly elliptical Molniya orbits with an inclination of 63 degrees and orbital periods of close to 12 hours. These were in similar orbits to the Satellite Data System relay satellites.

The successors to the Jumpseat series are the Trumpet satellites.

== List of satellite launches ==
Eight JUMPSEAT satellites with mission numbers 7701 to 7708 were launched between March 21, 1971, and February 12, 1987, from Vandenberg Space Launch Complex 4 West (SLC-4W) on Titan IIIB launch vehicles with Agena D boosters.

There was one failure (OPS 1844, on February 16, 1972), when the second satellite's Agena malfunctioned and left the satellite in a useless orbit.

List of JUMPSEAT launches
Name	COSPAR ID SATCAT No.	Launch date (UTC)	Launch vehicle	Result
OPS 4788	1971-021A; 05053	March 21, 1971; 03:45	Titan III(33)B	Success
OPS 1844	N/A	February 16, 1972; 09:59	Titan III(33)B	Failure
OPS 7724	1973-056A; 06791	August 21, 1973; 16:07	Titan III(33)B	Success
OPS 2439	1975-017A; 07687	March 10, 1975; 04:41	Titan III(34)B	Success
OPS 6031	1978-021A; 10688	February 25, 1978; 05:00	Titan III(34)B	Success
OPS 7225	1981-038A; 12418	April 24, 1981; 21:32	Titan III(34)B	Success
OPS 7304	1983-078A; 14237	July 31, 1983; 15:41	Titan III(34)B	Success
USA-21	1987-015A; 17506	February 12, 1987; 06:40	Titan III(34)B	Success

== General ==
- Richelson, Jeffrey T. ed. U.S. Military Uses of Space, 1945-1991 Vol 1, Guide. National Security Archive. 1991.
