= SLDCOM =

Satellite communications system of the United States Armed Forces

SLDCOM is a satellite communications system operated by the U.S. National Reconnaissance Office and used by the United States Armed Forces. The space-based assets of the system were flown as part of the Satellite Launch Dispenser (SLD) hardware on several Titan IV rocket launches which also launched Naval Ocean Surveillance System (NOSS) satellites. The SLDCOM system provides bent pipe UHF communications.
