= Initial Defense Communications Satellite Program =

American satellite family

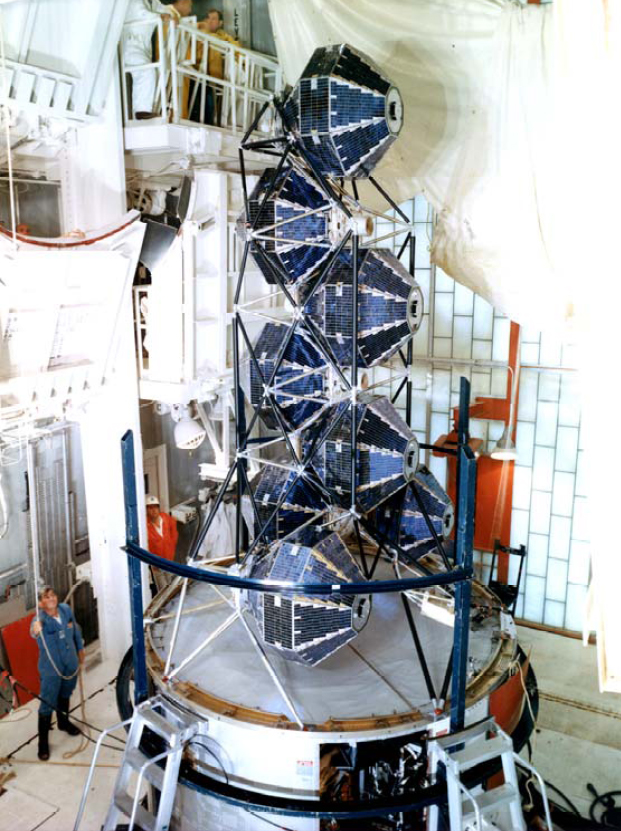
- Set of IDCSP satellites in truss of Titan IIIC Transtage
- Manufacturer: TRW
- Country of origin: United States
- Operator: Defense Communications Agency
- Applications: Satellite Communications

Specifications
- Spacecraft type: Small satellite
- Launch mass: 45 kilograms (99 lb)
- Equipment: SHF 7–8 GHz transponder
- Regime: Subsynchronous
- Design life: 6 years

Production
- Status: Retired
- Launched: 35 (8 launch failures, 27 in orbit)
- Maiden launch: 16 June 1966
- Last launch: 13 June 1968

The Initial Defense Communications Satellite Program or IDCSP was the first United States Department of Defense communications satellite constellation and the first stage of the Defense Communications Satellite Program (DCSP). Launched in five groups by Titan IIIC launch vehicles to near equatorial, subsynchronous orbits between 1966 and 1968, they were intended to be experimental testbeds. They were so successful that, by the time of the launch of the last set of eight satellites, the IDCSP was deemed operational and renamed Initial Defense Satellite Communications System or IDSCS. This system allowed real-time collection of battlefield intelligence during the Vietnam War. A total of 35 IDCSP satellites were launched, 27 successfully.

== Background ==
The Initial Defense Communications Satellite Program or IDCSP was the first stage in the Defense Communications Satellite Program (DCSP) commissioned by United States Secretary of Defense Robert McNamara in 1962. Under the DCSP, several increasingly sophisticated satellite series would test and provide long-range communications between "fixed, transportable or shipboard terminals". Development of these series would be managed by the Defense Communications Agency (DCA). This decision came on the heels of the cancellation of Project ADVENT, the first attempt at a military geosynchronous communications satellite system, begun February 1960. Originally costed at $140 million to develop, $170 million had been spent by 1962, and the estimated total cost had reached $325 million. The cheaper, "interim" IDCSP was chosen to replace ADVENT. It would use a constellation of 24-30 satellites launched into Medium Earth Orbit via ten Atlas Agena rockets for a total cost of $165 million ($60 million of which would be spent on satellites).

Philco's Western Development Division was originally selected by the United States Air Force (USAF) to build the satellites. However, by 1964, the development of the much more powerful Titan IIIC booster made it possible for fewer IDCSP satellites to fulfill the same mission at a higher altitude. Four to eight could be launched on a single Titan IIIC rocket into slightly subsynchronous orbit. Once there, the satellites would be deployed one at a time over the course of three minutes from the Transtage of the Titan. The satellites would drift randomly at an average rate of 28.5° per day becoming a roughly evenly spaced belt of satellites above the Earth's equator. In this way, at least one satellite of the constellation would always be visible to an Earth station if one failed. Full coverage would be provided by at least 12 satellites.

Thus, the Titan IIIC was chosen to replace the Atlas Agena as the IDCSP launch vehicle. This change did not go unchallenged; the House Committee on Government Operations denounced the move, saying that the "plan for short-range economies depending on a high-risk program may prove costly in the end". With the selection of the Titan IIIC as the IDCSP booster, the Pentagon dropped contract negotiations with Philco, preferring to develop the satellites in-house. Through early 1965 the satellites were still being designed so that they could be lofted to Medium Earth Orbit via Atlas Agena in the event that the Titan IIIC was not available.

The Titan IIIC was developed in time for use, the first launch taking place just four months behind the original schedule. The satellites built by 1966, sufficient for three launches, had cost just $33 million to produce (an overage of $3 million on original estimates).

== Design ==
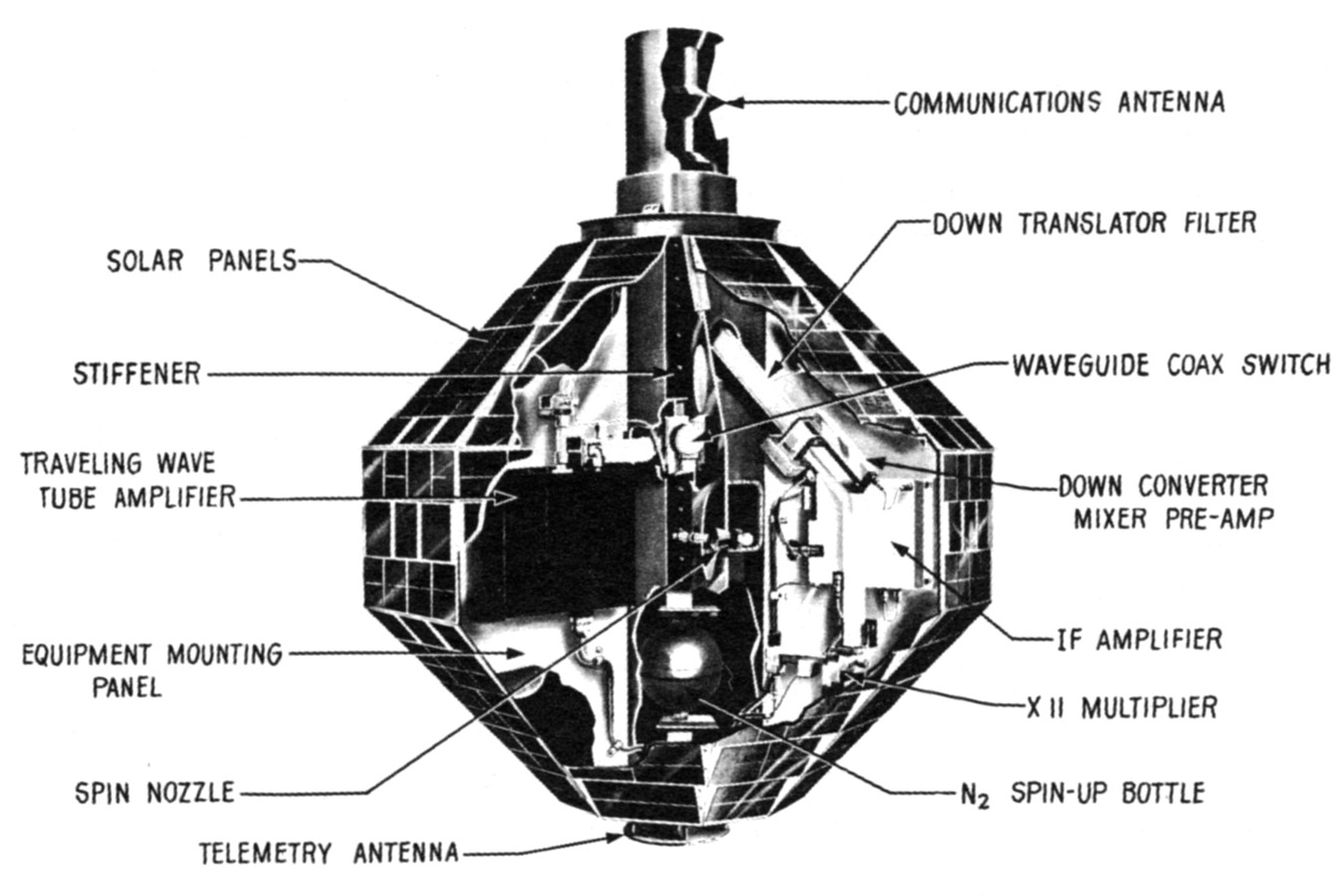
Initial Defense Communications Satellite Program satellite diagram

Developed primarily by TRW, the IDCSP spacecraft were identical communications satellites, spin-stabilized, 26-sided polygons, 86 cm (34 in) in diameter, covered with solar panels, and had a mass of 45 kilograms (99 lb). They were specifically designed to be simple to avoid the problems faced by the earlier Courier and Advent programs: no in-orbit control mechanisms were included, nor were the satellites equipped with batteries. The satellites were equipped with an automatic radiation shut-off device to deactivate them after six years in orbit.

Each satellite contained a single 3.5 Watt X-band or SHF transponder receiving at 8.025 GHz and transmitting 7.25–7.3 GHz (similar to the Lincoln Experimental Satellites procured around the same time) capable of concurrently supporting 600 voice or 6000 teletype conversations. Complementing these satellites were ground communications terminals used to transmit and receive via IDCSP satellite voice, imagery, computerized digital data, and teletype channel using Frequency-division multiplexing/Frequency Modulation (FDM/FM), Differential Phase Shift Keying (DPSK), Multiple frequency-shift keying (MFSK), and Spread Spectrum Multiple Access (SSMA) modulation techniques. The Eimac Division of Varian Associates supplied one of the two traveling wave amplifiers used by the satellite's transmitter, the other being produced by Watkins-Johnson Company. Because of the low power of the satellites' transponders, as well as its low-gain antenna, the receiving installations had to be very large.

== Operational history ==
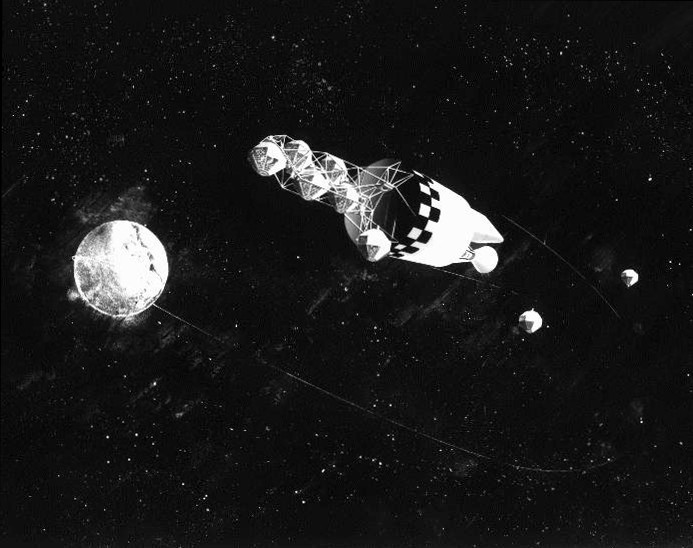
Artist's rendering of a Transtage deploying IDCSP satellites

The first launch of IDCSP satellites took place at 14:00:01 GMT on 16 June 1966 from Cape Canaveral Space Launch Complex 41 aboard the fourth Titan IIIC. After a successful Transtage burn placed the last stage of the Titan into a 33,670 km (20,920 mi) by 33,892 km (21,060 mi) orbit, the first seven IDCSP satellites (along with the Gravity Gradient Technology Satellite, a stabilization test satellite built on the same satellite bus) were dispersed one-by-one into orbit, each drifting 27.8° per day. Communications were conducted successfully between Fort Dix, New Jersey, and sites in California, England and Germany.

The second set of IDCSP satellites, totaling eight, was lost 26 August 1966 when a faulty payload fairing caused the launch failure of the fifth Titan IIIC. This proved to be the last unsuccessful Titan IIIC launch.

On 18 January 1967, the seventh Titan IIIC launch successfully placed a full constellation of eight IDCSP satellites into orbit, and on 1 July 1967, four more IDCSP satellites (including IDCSP 19, also known as DATS (Despun Antenna Test Satellite)) were put into orbit. IDCSP ground terminals had been installed at American bases at Saigon and Nha Trang by that time. Despite the comparative simplicity of the IDCSP constellation satellites, under Project Compass Link, the satellites made it possible for high-resolution photography to be transferred between the South Vietnamese capital and Washington, D.C., allowing near-real-time battlefield analysis. With the launch of the fourth system of eight satellites on 13 June 1968, DCA deemed the experimental system operational, renaming it the Initial Defense Satellite Communications System (IDSCS). This system afforded the American military a secure system for sensitive command-and-control communications, the more routine administrative and logistical messages being relayed via commercial satellites. The IDCSP constellation was also used by North Atlantic Treaty Organization states, which referred to the program as NATO-1.

In all, 35 IDCSP satellites were launched in 5 groups by Titan IIIC launch vehicles, 27 successfully to near equatorial, subsynchronous orbits. The automatic shut-off device installed on the IDCSP satellites did not work reliably, and many satellites operated long past their six-year lifespan. As of 1975, six were still functioning.

Technical and systems management assistance was provided to the USAF's Space Systems Division by The Aerospace Corporation. The IDCSP series was succeeded by the NATO-2 and DSCS-2 true geosynchronous satellites.

== Launches ==
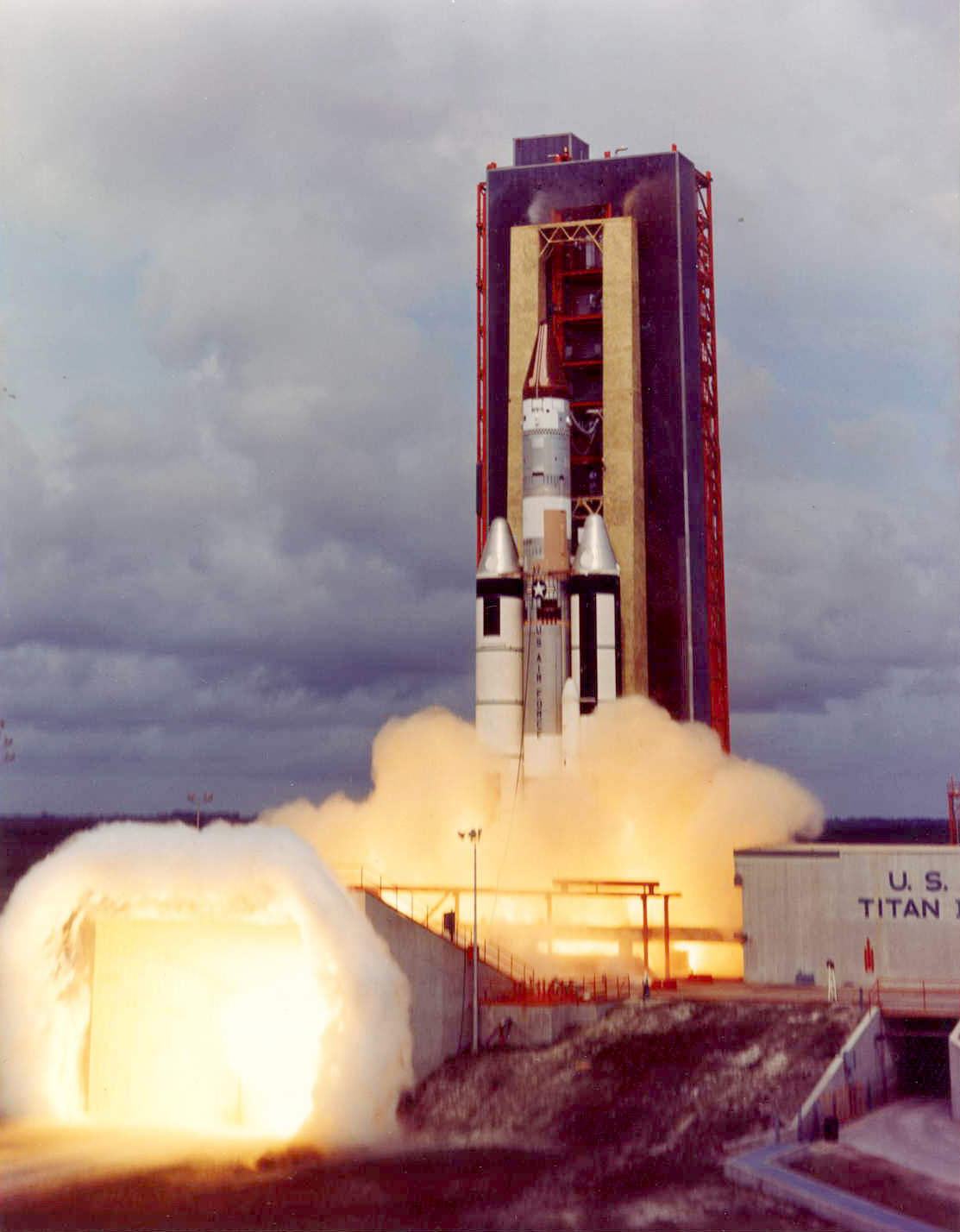
Titan IIIC-11 launch 16 June 1966

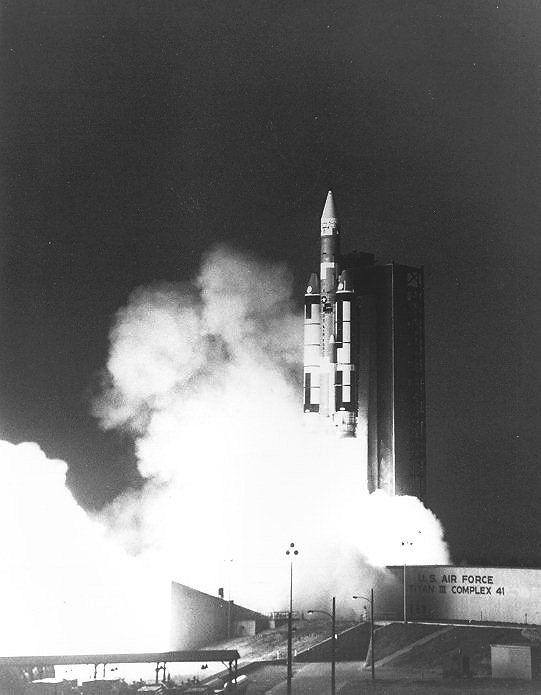
Titan IIIC-13 launch 18 January 1967

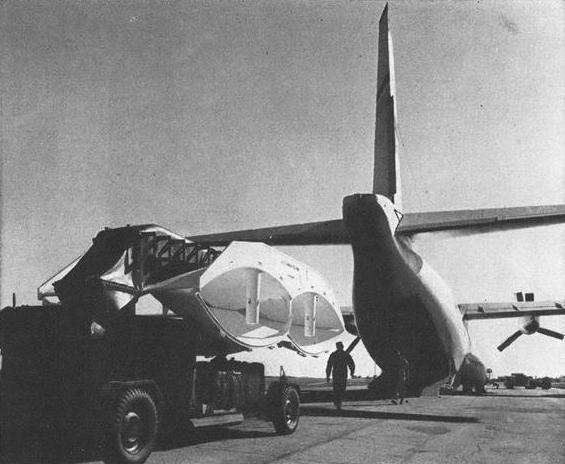
AN/TSC-54 communications ground terminal

Initial Defense Communications Satellite Program
Launch	Name(s)	Launch date	Rocket	Mass (kg)	Orbit regime	IRON	Re-entry
First
	IDCSP 1	16 June 1966	Titan IIIC	45	MEO	9311	In orbit
	IDCSP 2	16 June 1966	Titan IIIC	45	MEO	9312	In orbit
	IDCSP 3	16 June 1966	Titan IIIC	45	MEO	9313	In orbit
	IDCSP 4	16 June 1966	Titan IIIC	45	MEO	9314	In orbit
	IDCSP 5	16 June 1966	Titan IIIC	45	MEO	9315	In orbit
	IDCSP 6	16 June 1966	Titan IIIC	45	MEO	9316	In orbit
	IDCSP 7	16 June 1966	Titan IIIC	45	MEO	9317	In orbit
Second
	IDCSP	26 August 1966	Titan IIIC	45	MEO		Launch failure
	IDCSP	26 August 1966	Titan IIIC	45	MEO		Launch failure
	IDCSP	26 August 1966	Titan IIIC	45	MEO		Launch failure
	IDCSP	26 August 1966	Titan IIIC	45	MEO		Launch failure
	IDCSP	26 August 1966	Titan IIIC	45	MEO		Launch failure
	IDCSP	26 August 1966	Titan IIIC	45	MEO		Launch failure
	IDCSP	26 August 1966	Titan IIIC	45	MEO		Launch failure
	IDCSP	26 August 1966	Titan IIIC	45	MEO		Launch failure
Third
	IDCSP 8	18 January 1967	Titan IIIC	45	MEO	9321	In orbit
	IDCSP 9	18 January 1967	Titan IIIC	45	MEO	9322	In orbit
	IDCSP 10	18 January 1967	Titan IIIC	45	MEO	9323	In orbit
	IDCSP 11	18 January 1967	Titan IIIC	45	MEO	9324	In orbit
	IDCSP 12	18 January 1967	Titan IIIC	45	MEO	9325	In orbit
	IDCSP 13	18 January 1967	Titan IIIC	45	MEO	9326	In orbit
	IDCSP 14	18 January 1967	Titan IIIC	45	MEO	9327	In orbit
	IDCSP 15	18 January 1967	Titan IIIC	45	MEO	9328	In orbit
Fourth
	IDCSP 16	1 July 1967	Titan IIIC	45	MEO	9331	In orbit
	IDCSP 17	1 July 1967	Titan IIIC	45	MEO	9332	In orbit
	IDCSP 18	1 July 1967	Titan IIIC	45	MEO	9333	In orbit
	IDCSP 19/DATS	1 July 1967	Titan IIIC	45	MEO	9334	In orbit
Fifth
	IDCSP 20	13 June 1968	Titan IIIC	45	MEO	9341	In orbit
	IDCSP 21	13 June 1968	Titan IIIC	45	MEO	9342	In orbit
	IDCSP 22	13 June 1968	Titan IIIC	45	MEO	9343	In orbit
	IDCSP 23	13 June 1968	Titan IIIC	45	MEO	9344	In orbit
	IDCSP 24	13 June 1968	Titan IIIC	45	MEO	9345	In orbit
	IDCSP 25	13 June 1968	Titan IIIC	45	MEO	9346	In orbit
	IDCSP 26	13 June 1968	Titan IIIC	45	MEO	9347	In orbit
	IDCSP 27	13 June 1968	Titan IIIC	45	MEO	9348	In orbit
