= Battleship (rocketry) =

Non-functional rocket or rocket stage

In rocketry, 'battleship' was a term used during the design of the Saturn V to refer to a heavy duty rocket stage which was used to test configuration and integration of a launch vehicle.

The term was used in contrast to the boilerplate nickname, which refers to a non-functional mock-up used to test spacecraft.

A battleship is functional, but simpler, cheaper and heavier than the operational version. Thus, it functions but does not achieve the same performance (such as thrust-to-weight ratio) as the operational one. In particular, propellant tanks and major structural components may be constructed of thicker, more rugged materials rather than being carefully thinned to save as much weight as possible. This is done mainly to test the engines operationally and the configuration of the propellant tank passively. The S-IC-T could be considered to be a battleship of the S-IC of the Saturn V.

== See also ==
- Project Highwater
