= Naval Ocean Surveillance System =

Series of signals-intelligence satellites of the U.S. Navy

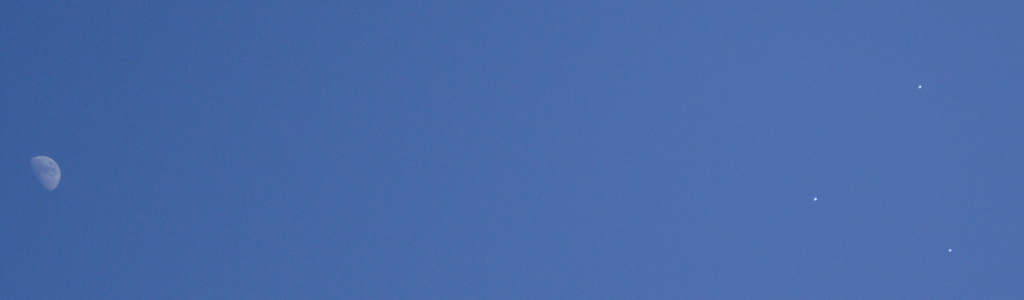
A NOSS satellite trio passes the Moon.

The Naval Ocean Surveillance System (NOSS) is a series of signals-intelligence satellites that have conducted electronic signals intelligence for the U.S. Navy since the early 1970s. The first series of satellites were codenamed "White Cloud" or "PARCAE", while second- and third-generation satellites have used the codenames "Ranger" and "Intruder".

The system is operated by the United States Navy, and its main purpose was tactical geolocation of Soviet Navy assets during the Cold War. NOSS involves satellite clusters operating in low Earth orbit to detect radar and other electronic transmissions from ships at sea and locate them using the time difference of arrival technique.

== Satellites ==
=== First generation NOSS-1 (1976–1987) ===
The first generation of NOSS satellites was developed by the Naval Research Laboratory (NRL) based on the previous generations of electronic listening satellites: Grab (1960–1962) and Poppy (1962–1971). Eight clusters of 3 satellites were launched between 1976 and 1987.

Each launch carried out by an Atlas F, E or H) with a dispenser placed three sub-satellites into orbit. The dispenser is responsible, thanks to its solid propellant engine, for placing the three sub-satellites into their operational orbit of 1,050 × 1,150 km with an inclination of 63°. To be able to track ships, the three satellites maintain a triangular formation with a distance between 30 and 240 km .

Each satellite has on one of its faces a series of antennas intended to collect the signals emitted by ships which are kept constantly turned towards the Earth. The satellite's orientation is maintained by gravity gradient pointed towards the Earth thanks to a boom 10 to 15 meters long.

First generation (Parcae)
Name	ID	Launch date	Launch vehicle	Launch site	Perigee	Apogee	Inclination	Remarks
OPS 6431 SSU-1	1976-038C	30 April 1976	Atlas E/F-MSD	VAFB, SLC-3W	1,092 km	1,128 km	63.5°	Dispenser designated OPS 6431 and catalogued as 1976-038A.
OPS 6431 SSU-2	1976-038D	30 April 1976	Atlas E/F-MSD	VAFB, SLC-3W	1,092 km	1,128 km	63.5°	Dispenser designated OPS 6431 and catalogued as 1976-038A.
OPS 6431 SSU-3	1976-038J	30 April 1976	Atlas E/F-MSD	VAFB, SLC-3W	1,092 km	1,128 km	63.5°	Dispenser designated OPS 6431 and catalogued as 1976-038A.
OPS 8781 SSU-1	1977-112D	8 December 1977	Atlas E/F-MSD	VAFB, SLC-3W	1,054 km	1,169 km	63.4°	Dispenser designated OPS 8781 and catalogued as 1977-112A.
OPS 8781 SSU-2	1977-112E	8 December 1977	Atlas E/F-MSD	VAFB, SLC-3W	1,054 km	1,169 km	63.4°	Dispenser designated OPS 8781 and catalogued as 1977-112A.
OPS 8781 SSU-3	1977-112F	8 December 1977	Atlas E/F-MSD	VAFB, SLC-3W	1,054 km	1,169 km	63.4°	Dispenser designated OPS 8781 and catalogued as 1977-112A.
OPS 7245 SSU-1	1980-019C	3 March 1980	Atlas E/F-MSD	VAFB, SLC-3W	1,035 km	1,150 km	63.0°	Dispenser designated OPS 7245 and catalogued as 1980-019A.
OPS 7245 SSU-2	1980-019D	3 March 1980	Atlas E/F-MSD	VAFB, SLC-3W	1,035 km	1,150 km	63.0°	Dispenser designated OPS 7245 and catalogued as 1980-019A.
OPS 7245 SSU-3	1980-019G	3 March 1980	Atlas E/F-MSD	VAFB, SLC-3W	1,035 km	1,150 km	63.0°	Dispenser designated OPS 7245 and catalogued as 1980-019A.
OPS 3255 SSU-1	N/A	9 December 1980	Atlas E/F-MSD	VAFB, SLC-3W	Failed to orbit			Dispenser designated OPS 3255, loss of control after engine failure, followed by explosion.
OPS 3255 SSU-2	N/A	9 December 1980	Atlas E/F-MSD	VAFB, SLC-3W	Failed to orbit			Dispenser designated OPS 3255, loss of control after engine failure, followed by explosion.
OPS 3255 SSU-3	N/A	9 December 1980	Atlas E/F-MSD	VAFB, SLC-3W	Failed to orbit			Dispenser designated OPS 3255, loss of control after engine failure, followed by explosion.
OPS 0252 SSU-1	1983-008E	9 February 1983	Atlas H-MSD	VAFB, SLC-3E	1,063 km	1,186 km	63.40°	Dispenser designated OPS 0252 and catalogued as 1983-008A.
OPS 0252 SSU-2	1983-008F	9 February 1983	Atlas H-MSD	VAFB, SLC-3E	1,063 km	1,186 km	63.40°	Dispenser designated OPS 0252 and catalogued as 1983-008A.
OPS 0252 SSU-3	1983-008H	9 February 1983	Atlas H-MSD	VAFB, SLC-3E	1,063 km	1,186 km	63.40°	Dispenser designated OPS 0252 and catalogued as 1983-008A.
OPS 6432 SSU-1	1983-056C	9 June 1983	Atlas H-MSD	VAFB, SLC-3E	851 km	1,363 km	63.4°	Dispenser designated OPS 6432 and catalogued as 1983-056A.
OPS 6432 SSU-2	1983-056D	9 June 1983	Atlas H-MSD	VAFB, SLC-3E	851 km	1,363 km	63.4°	Dispenser designated OPS 6432 and catalogued as 1983-056A.
OPS 6432 SSU-3	1983-056G	9 June 1983	Atlas H-MSD	VAFB, SLC-3E	851 km	1,363 km	63.4°	Dispenser designated OPS 6432 and catalogued as 1983-056A.
OPS 8737 SSU-1	1984-012C	5 February 1984	Atlas H-MSD	VAFB, SLC-3E	1,052 km	1,172 km	63.4°	Dispenser designated OPS 8737 and catalogued as 1984-012A.
OPS 8737 SSU-2	1984-012D	5 February 1984	Atlas H-MSD	VAFB, SLC-3E	1,052 km	1,172 km	63.4°	Dispenser designated OPS 8737 and catalogued as 1984-012A.
OPS 8737 SSU-3	1984-012F	5 February 1984	Atlas H-MSD	VAFB, SLC-3E	1,052 km	1,172 km	63.4°	Dispenser designated OPS 8737 and catalogued as 1984-012A.
USA-16	1986-014E	9 February 1986	Atlas H-MSD	VAFB, SLC-3E	1,049 km	1,166 km	63.0°	Dispenser designated USA-15 and catalogued as 1986-014A.
USA-17	1986-014F	9 February 1986	Atlas H-MSD	VAFB, SLC-3E	1,049 km	1,166 km	63.0°	Dispenser designated USA-15 and catalogued as 1986-014A.
USA-18	1986-014H	9 February 1986	Atlas H-MSD	VAFB, SLC-3E	1,049 km	1,166 km	63.0°	Dispenser designated USA-15 and catalogued as 1986-014A.
USA-23	1987-043E	15 May 1987	Atlas H-MSD	VAFB, SLC-3E	1,045 km	1,179 km	62.9°	Dispenser designated USA-22 and catalogued as 1987-043A.
USA-24	1987-043F	15 May 1987	Atlas H-MSD	VAFB, SLC-3E	1,045 km	1,179 km	62.9°	Dispenser designated USA-22 and catalogued as 1987-043A.
USA-26	1987-043H	15 May 1987	Atlas H-MSD	VAFB, SLC-3E	1,045 km	1,179 km	62.9°	Dispenser designated USA-22 and catalogued as 1987-043A.

=== Second generation NOSS-2 (1990–1996) ===
The second generation of NOSS satellites, first launched in 1990, adopted the same configuration as the previous generation. The satellites were launched in clusters of three with a Titan Launch Dispenser (TLD) responsible for positioning them in their operational orbit (1,100 × 1,100 km with an inclination of 63.4°) and adopted a triangular configuration.

Four NOSS-2 cluster launches took place between 1990 and 1996 (one failure in 1993). The satellites were much heavier and had to be launched by a Titan IV rocket.

The dispenser played a secondary role: after ejecting the NOSS satellites, it placed itself in an elliptical orbit (1,100 × 9,000 km) where a dedicated telecommunications module (Satellite Launch Dispenser Communications System or SLDCOM) was used for tactical military telecommunications.

Second generation
Name	ID	Launch date	Launch vehicle	Launch site	Perigee	Apogee	Inclination	Remarks
USA-60	1990-050E	8 June 1990	Titan IV(405)A	CCAFS, LC-41	1,071 km	1,146 km	63.4°	Dispenser designated USA-59 and catalogued as 1990-050A.
USA-61	1990-050F	8 June 1990	Titan IV(405)A	CCAFS, LC-41	1,071 km	1,146 km	63.4°	Dispenser designated USA-59 and catalogued as 1990-050A.
USA-62	1990-050H	8 June 1990	Titan IV(405)A	CCAFS, LC-41	1,071 km	1,146 km	63.4°	Dispenser designated USA-59 and catalogued as 1990-050A.
USA-74	1991-076C	8 November 1991	Titan IV(403)A	VAFB, SLC-4E	1,052 km	1,164 km	63.4°	Dispenser designated USA-72 and catalogued as 1991-076A.
USA-76	1991-076D	8 November 1991	Titan IV(403)A	VAFB, SLC-4E	1,052 km	1,164 km	63.4°	Dispenser designated USA-72 and catalogued as 1991-076A.
USA-77	1991-076E	8 November 1991	Titan IV(403)A	VAFB, SLC-4E	1,052 km	1,164 km	63.4°	Dispenser designated USA-72 and catalogued as 1991-076A.
Unnamed	N/A	2 August 1993	Titan IV(403)A	VAFB, SLC-4E	Failed to orbit			Exploded due to crack in solid rocket motor caused by poor repair.
Unnamed	N/A	2 August 1993	Titan IV(403)A	VAFB, SLC-4E	Failed to orbit			Exploded due to crack in solid rocket motor caused by poor repair.
Unnamed	N/A	2 August 1993	Titan IV(403)A	VAFB, SLC-4E	Failed to orbit			Exploded due to crack in solid rocket motor caused by poor repair.
USA-119	1996-029A	12 May 1996	Titan IV(403)A	VAFB, SLC-4E	1,050 km	1,166 km	63.4°	Dispenser designated USA-122 and catalogued as 1996-029D.
USA-120	1996-029B	12 May 1996	Titan IV(403)A	VAFB, SLC-4E	1,050 km	1,166 km	63.4°	Dispenser designated USA-122 and catalogued as 1996-029D.
USA-121	1996-029C	12 May 1996	Titan IV(403)A	VAFB, SLC-4E	1,050 km	1,166 km	63.4°	Dispenser designated USA-122 and catalogued as 1996-029D.

=== Third generation NOSS-3 (2001–2017) ===
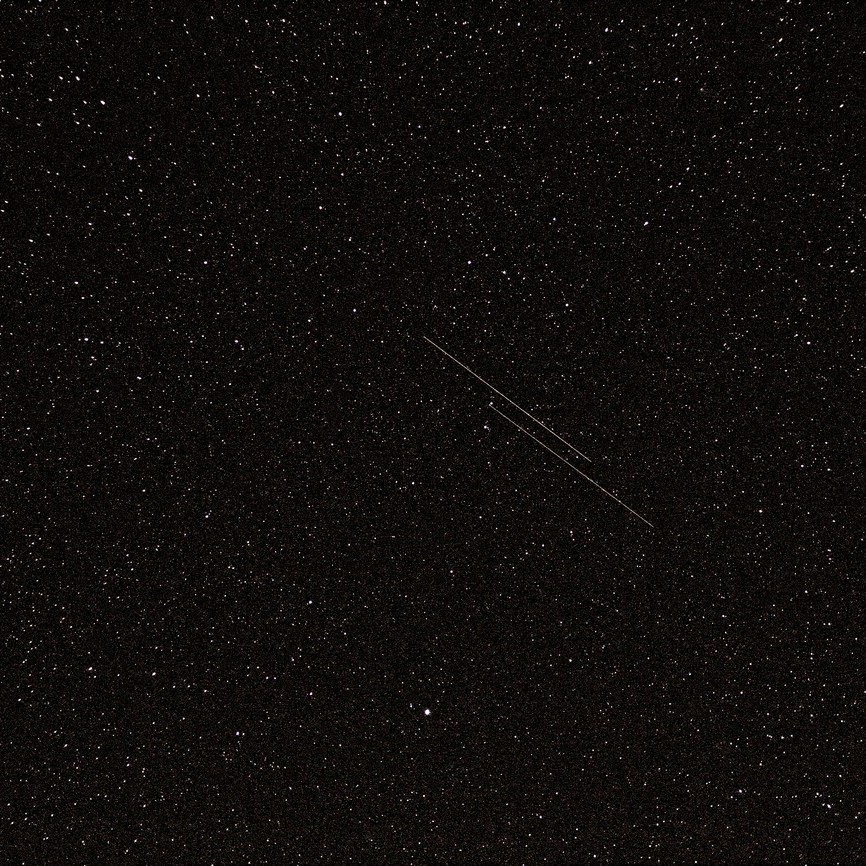
NOSS 3-3 duo passing by Polaris (bright star at the bottom). Movement in this 12.3-seconds exposure is from upper-left to bottom-right; the A object is leading. 6 February 2016, 18:52 (UTC+2), Kyiv.

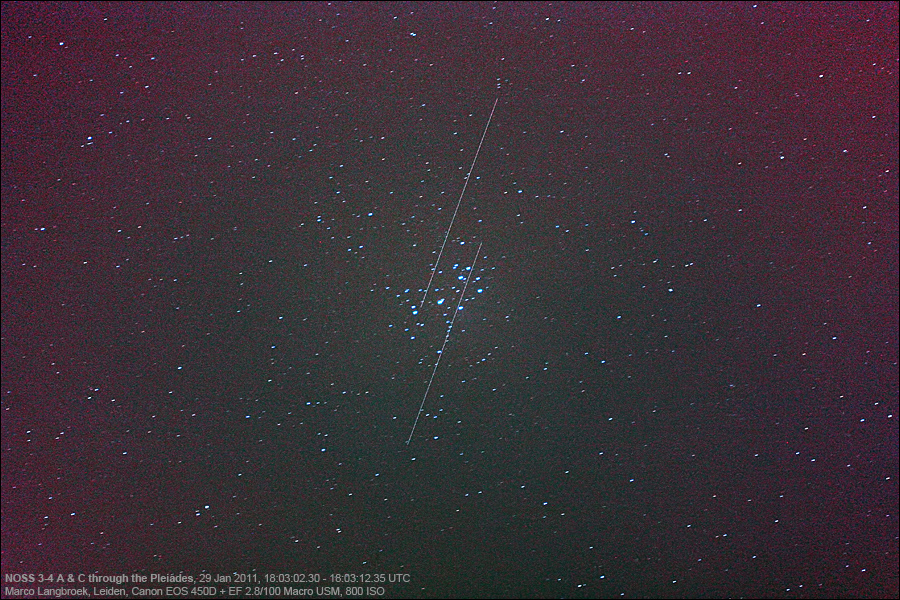
The NOSS 3-4 duo (2007-027A and C) crossing through the Pleiades. Movement in this 10-second exposure is from top to bottom, the A object is leading.

The third generation was deployed after 2001. Unlike previous generations, the satellites are launched and operate in pairs and don't require a dispenser. The combined mass of a satellites pair is 6,500 kg. The orbit is identical to previous generations: 1,100 × 1,100 km with an inclination of 64°.

Eight pairs of satellites were launched between 2001 and 2017. The launchers used were Atlas II, Atlas III and Atlas V.

Third generation (Intruder)
Name	ID	Launch date	Launch vehicle	Launch site	NROL designation	Perigee	Apogee	Inclination	Remarks
USA-160	2001-040A	8 September 2001	Atlas IIAS	VAFB, SLC-3E	NROL-13	1,100 km	1,100 km	63.0°	
Unnamed*	2001-040C	8 September 2001	Atlas IIAS	VAFB, SLC-3E	NROL-13	1,100 km	1,100 km	63.0°	
USA-173	2003-054A	2 December 2003	Atlas IIAS	VAFB, SLC-3E	NROL-18	1,013 km	1,200 km	63.4°	
Unnamed*	2003-054C	2 December 2003	Atlas IIAS	VAFB, SLC-3E	NROL-18	1,013 km	1,200 km	63.4°	
USA-181	2005-004A	3 February 2005	Atlas IIIB	CCAFS, SLC-36B	NROL-23	1,011 km	1,209 km	63.4°	
Unnamed*	2005-004C	3 February 2005	Atlas IIIB	CCAFS, SLC-36B	NROL-23	1,011 km	1,209 km	63.4°	
USA-194	2007-027A	15 June 2007	Atlas V 401	CCAFS, SLC-41	NROL-30	1,053 km	1,163 km	63.4°	Launched into lower orbit than planned, spacecraft corrected under own power, at expense of operational life.
Unnamed*	2007-027C	15 June 2007	Atlas V 401	CCAFS, SLC-41	NROL-30	1,053 km	1,163 km	63.4°	Launched into lower orbit than planned, spacecraft corrected under own power, at expense of operational life.
USA-229	2011-014A	15 April 2011	Atlas V 411	VAFB, SLC-3E	NROL-34	1,015 km	1,207 km	63.46°	
Unnamed*	2011-014B	15 April 2011	Atlas V 411	VAFB, SLC-3E	NROL-34	1,015 km	1,207 km	63.46°	
USA-238	2012-048A	13 September 2012	Atlas V 401	VAFB, SLC-3E	NROL-36	1,056 km	1,158 km	63.4°	
Unnamed*	2012-048P	13 September 2012	Atlas V 401	VAFB, SLC-3E	NROL-36	1,056 km	1,158 km	63.4°	
USA-264	2015-058A	8 October 2015	Atlas V 401	VAFB, SLC-3E	NROL-55	1,013 km	1,201 km	63.4°	
Unnamed*	2015-058R	8 October 2015	Atlas V 401	VAFB, SLC-3E	NROL-55	1,013 km	1,201 km	63.4°	
USA-274	2017-011A	1 March 2017	Atlas V 401	VAFB, SLC-3E	NROL-79	1,010 km	1,204 km	63.4°	
Unnamed*	2017-011B	1 March 2017	Atlas V 401	VAFB, SLC-3E	NROL-79	1,010 km	1,204 km	63.4°	

Note: * One satellite from each third generation pair is officially catalogued as debris.

=== Fourth generation NOSS-4 (2022–) ===
The fourth generation of NOSS satellites seems to consist of single-satellite launches, as no secondary payload has been detected in any of the launches of the fourth generation to date. This would suggest an improved iteration of those satellites capable of relying on a single unit to perform their maritime tracking tasks via radio transmission detection.

Fourth generation (Intruder F/O)
Name	ID	Launch date	Launch vehicle	Launch site	NROL designation	Perigee	Apogee	Inclination	Remarks
USA-327	2022-040A	17 April 2022	Falcon 9 Block 5	VAFB, SLC-4E	NROL-85	1,100 km	1,100 km	63.4°	Launched.
USA-498	2025-060A	24 March 2025	Falcon 9 Block 5	CCAFS, SLC-40	NROL-69	1,100 km	1,100 km	63.4°	Launched.
USA-570		10 December 2025	Falcon 9 Block 5	CCAFS, SLC-40	NROL-77	1,100 km	1,100 km		Launched.
USA-619		30 July 2026	Falcon 9 Block 5	CCAFS, SLC-40	NROL-95	1,100 km	1,100 km		Launched.

== Cost ==
The costs of the NOSS satellites (excluding costs for the launch vehicle), which were destroyed in a Titan IV launch failure in 1993, were US$800 million (inflation adjusted US$ 1.8 billion in 2025).

== See also ==
- Poppy (satellite)
- Yaogan
- CERES (satellite)
