= Titan IIIB =

Model of Titan III launch vehicle

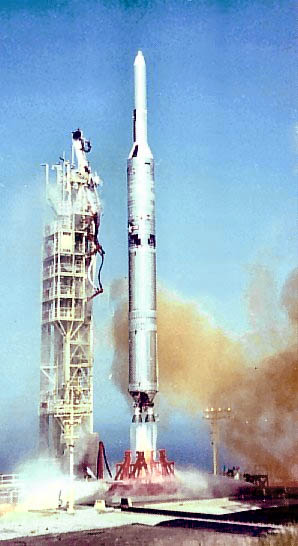
- Titan-3B Agena-D launching the KH-8 5 reconnaissance satellite from Vandenberg AFB, CA. (USAF)
- Function: Medium launch vehicle
- Manufacturer: Martin
- Country of origin: United States

Size
- Height: 45 m (148 ft)
- Diameter: 3.05 m (10.0 ft)
- Mass: 156,540 kg (345,110 lb)
- Stages: 3

Capacity

Payload to LEO
- Mass: 3,300 kg (7,300 lb) (23B)

Associated rockets
- Family: Titan

Launch history
- Status: Retired
- Launch sites: SLC-4W, Vandenberg AFB
- Total launches: 68
- Success(es): 62
- Failure: 4
- Partial failure: 2
- First flight: 29 July 1966
- Last flight: 12 February 1987

First stage (Titan 23B/33B)
- Powered by: 2 LR87-AJ-5
- Maximum thrust: 1,913 kN (430,000 lb_{f})
- Burn time: 147 seconds
- Propellant: N_{2}O_{4} / Aerozine 50

Second stage
- Powered by: 1 LR91-11
- Maximum thrust: 445 kN (100,000 lb_{f})
- Burn time: 205 seconds
- Propellant: N_{2}O_{4} / Aerozine 50

Third stage – Agena D
- Powered by: 1 Bell XLR81-BA-9
- Maximum thrust: 71.7 kN (16,100 lb_{f})
- Burn time: 240 seconds
- Propellant: IRFNA/UDMH

Titan IIIB was the collective name for a number of derivatives of the Titan II ICBM and Titan III launch vehicle, modified by the addition of an Agena upper stage. It consisted of five separate rockets. The Titan-3B Agena-D was a basic Titan IIIA with an Agena D upper stage. The Titan 23B was a basic Titan III with an Agena upper stage, and the Titan 24B was the same concept, but using the slightly enlarged Titan IIIM rocket as the base. The Titan 33B was a Titan 23B with the Agena (which had a smaller diameter than the Titan) enclosed in an enlarged fairing, in order to allow larger payloads to be launched. The final member of the Titan IIIB family was the Titan 34B which was a Titan 24B with the larger fairing used on the Titan 33B.

== Features ==
Part of the Titan rocket family, the Titan 23B space launch vehicle was a three-stage liquid fueled booster, designed to provide a small-to-medium weight class capability. It was able to lift approximately 3,000 kg (6,600 lb) into a polar low-Earth circular orbit. The first stage consisted of a ground ignited Aerojet LR-87 liquid propellant rocket, while the second stage consisted of an LR91 liquid propellant rocket. The third stage was an Agena D XLR81-BA-9 liquid propellant rocket.

Various models of this Titan/Agena D rocket were called, "Titan-3B Agena-D", "Titan 23B", "Titan 24B", "Titan 33B" and "Titan 34B".

== Background ==
The Titan rocket family was established in October 1955, when the Air Force awarded The Martin Company a contract to build an intercontinental ballistic missile (ICBM). It became known as the Titan I, the nation's first two-stage ICBM and first underground silo-based ICBM. More than 140 Titan II ICBMs, once the vanguard of America's strategic deterrent force, were built. Titan IIs also were flown in NASA's Gemini crewed space program in the mid-1960s. The Titan 23B is a derivative of the Titan II vehicle with an Agena D upper stage added.

The Titan IIIB family emerged when the new KH-8 (Gambit Mark 3) photo reconnaissance satellite was being developed as the successor to the KH-7 Gambit Mark 1/2 which began flying in 1963. It was decided to switch to the Titan family over the Atlas used for KH-7 because it had substantially more lift capability and also its conventional two-stage design and hypergolic propellants made for a simpler and more reliable launch vehicle than the quirky Atlas. The KH-8 was double the size of its predecessor but still well below the Titan's lift capability.

While the KH-8 was the original raison d'être for the Titan IIIB's existence, as well as its primary payload, the booster was also used for Jumpseat SIGINT satellites and military comsats. It also lived up to its promise of greater reliability than the Thor and Atlas, with only a few failures over its run.

Primary function: Launch vehicle used to lift medium class satellites into space:

- Builder: The Martin Company
- Launch site: Vandenberg AFB, Calif.
- First stage: Length: 70 ft (21 m)
- Diameter: 10 feet (3.05 m)
- Engine thrust: 474,000 lbf (2,110 kN) vacuum
- Weight: 258,000 pounds (117,000 kg) Fueled
  - Empty weight: 10,500 pounds (4,800 kg)
- Second stage: Length: 24 ft (7.3 m)
- Diameter: 10 ft (3.0 m)
- Engine Thrust: 100,000 lbf (440 kN) vacuum
- Weight: 64,000 pounds (29,000 kg) Fueled
  - Empty weight: 6,100 pounds (2,800 kg)
- Third stage: Length: 24.8 ft (7.6 m)
- Diameter: 5 ft (1.5 m)
- Engine thrust: 16,000 lbf (71 kN) vacuum
- Weight: 7,160 kg (15,790 lb) – fueled
  - Empty Weight: 2,300 pounds (1,000 kg)
- Guidance: Radio
- Subcontractor: GE
- Payload fairing: Diameter: 5 ft (1.5 m)
- Length: 20 to 25 ft (6.1 to 7.6 m)
- Skin and Stringer Construction – Tri-Sector Design
- Subcontractor: Boeing
- Date deployed: July 1966

== Titan-3B Agena-D ==
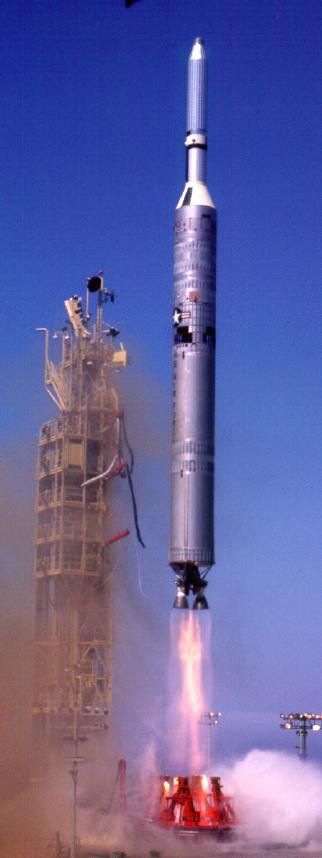
Titan-3B Agena D

Titan-3B Agena-D used the same core and second stage as the Titan-IIIA, but added an Agena D upper stage. Twenty-two flights took place from SLC-4W at Vandenberg AFB between 1966 and 1969, all launching KH-8 satellites.

Configuration:

- First stage: 2 × LR-87-AJ9
- Second stage: LR-91-AJ9
- Third stage: Agena-D

== Titan 23B ==
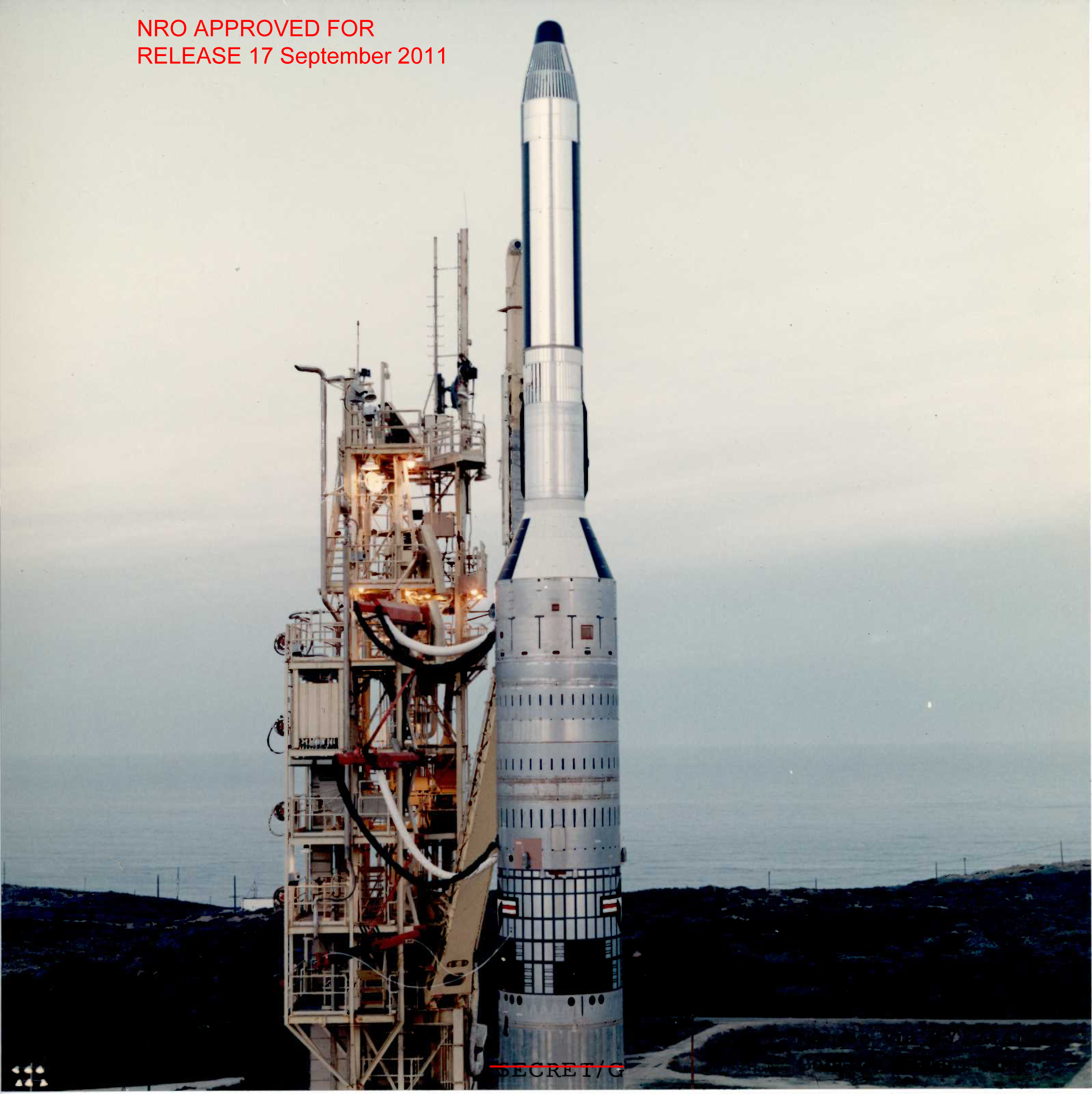
Titan 23B

Titan 23B used the basic Titan-IIIA core (with an updated first and second stage engines) with an Agena D upper stage, though without the all-inertial guidance system, malfunction detection equipment, and redundant systems required for man-rating the 3A. The Titan 23B was launched from SLC-4W at Vandenberg AFB. Its main payload was the GAMBIT (KH-8 reconnaissance) satellites, in nine flights from 1969 through 1971.

Configuration:

- First stage: 2 × LR-87-AJ11
- Second stage: LR-91-AJ11
- Third stage: Agena-D

== Titan 24B ==
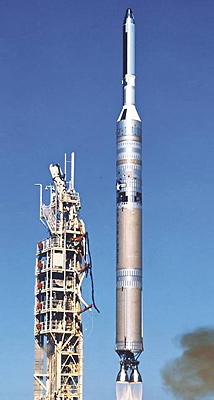
Titan 24B

The Titan 24B differed from the Titan 23B in that the Titan IIIM core with extended propellant tanks was used in place of the original Titan II core. The payload remained attached to the Agena stage. Twenty-three flights took place from SLC-4W at Vandenberg AFB between 1971 and 1984, with two failures.

Configuration:

- First stage: 2 × LR-87-AJ11, extended tank
- Second stage: LR-91-AJ11
- Third stage: Agena-D

== Titan 33B ==
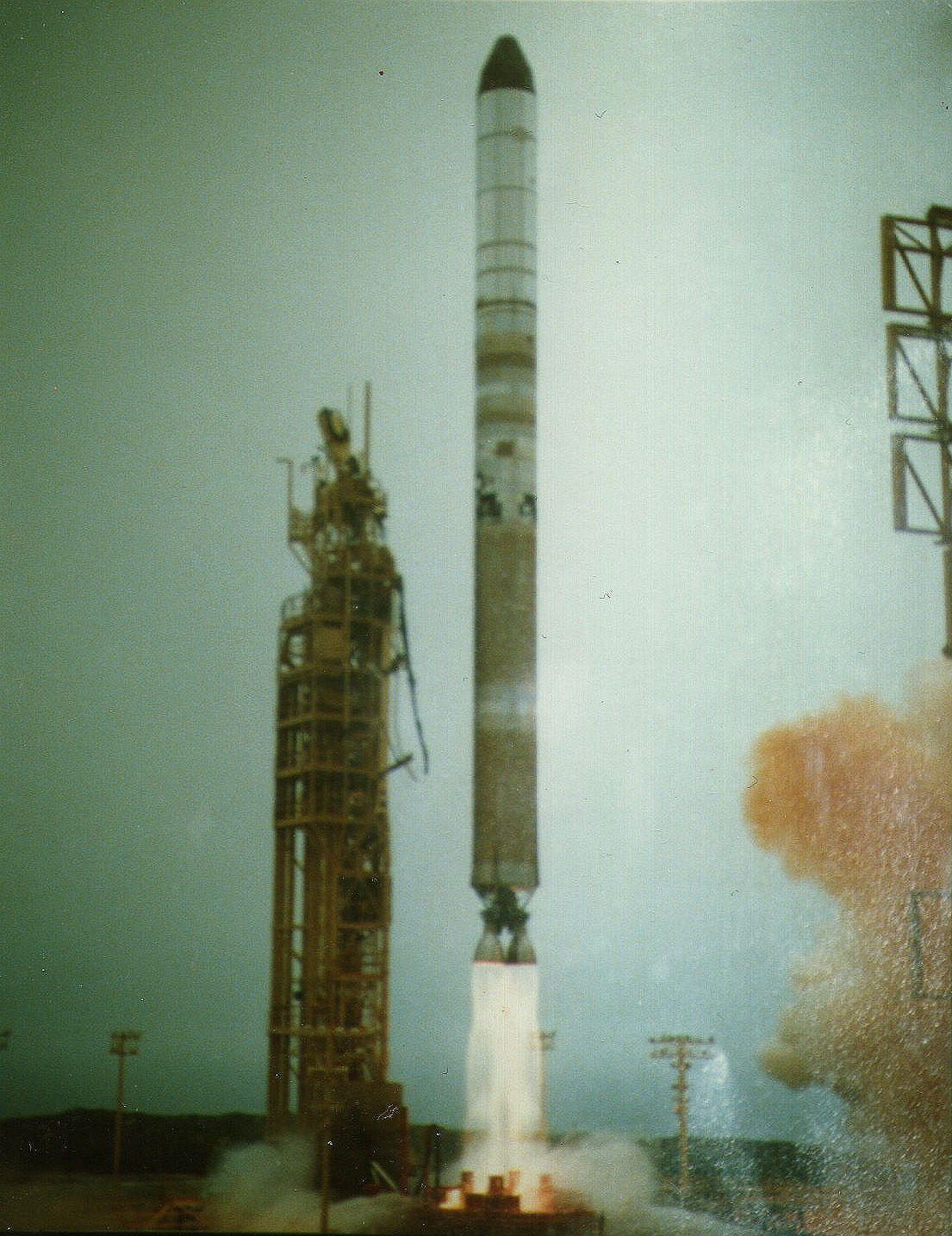
Titan 33B

The Titan 33B was a Titan 23B with the entire Agena and payload completely enclosed in a shroud. It flew only three times from SLC-4W at Vandenberg AFB between 1971 and 1973 with one failure, being used to launch Jumpseat satellites.

Configuration:

- First stage: 2 × LR-87-AJ11
- Second stage: LR-91-AJ11
- Third stage: Agena-D, larger fairing

== Titan 34B ==
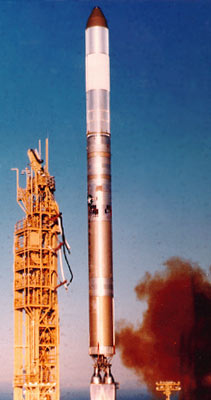
Titan 34B

The Titan 34B was a Titan 24B, modified by the addition of the larger fairing used on the Titan 33B. Eleven flights took place from SLC-4W at Vandenberg AFB between 1975 and 1987.

Configuration:

- First stage: 2 × LR-87-AJ11, extended tank
- Second stage: LR-91-AJ11
- Third stage: Agena-D, larger fairing

== Failures ==
Titan IIIB rockets suffered four outright failures, and two partial failures. The first failure occurred on 26 April 1967 during the launch of a Gambit 3 satellite when the second stage suffered a sudden thrust decay which left it unable to achieve orbital velocity, sending the Agena and GAMBIT into the Pacific Ocean some 400 miles (644 km) downrange. It was not possible to determine the cause of the malfunction with certainty, but a fuel line obstruction was believed to be the most likely explanation. Martin-Marietta had no answers except to suggest implementing better quality control measures during assembly of the Titan vehicles. The next launch, on 20 June 1967 was a partial failure; due to a problem with the protective skirt on the second stage, a lower-than-planned orbit was achieved. On 24 October 1969 OPS 8455 was placed into a higher-than-planned orbit by another 23B due to an engine failing to cut off after completing its planned burn, however the payload was able to correct its own orbit.

On 16 February 1972, a Titan 33B failed to achieve orbit carrying a Jumpseat satellite. Another failure occurred later the same year, when on 20 May a Titan 24B malfunctioned during the launch of KH-8 #35. The Agena suffered a failure of a pneumatic regulator during ascent and reentered the atmosphere. Although it had been assumed debris would land near South Africa, pieces turned up in faraway Great Britain a few months later. The launch of KH-8 #39 on 26 June 1973 also failed to orbit when the Agena had a fuel valve failure, preventing engine start. A launch of a Jumpseat satellite on 24 April 1981 was a partial failure when the Agena failed to separate.

== See also ==
- Titan (rocket family)
- KH-8 Gambit 3 reconnaissance satellite.
