= Transfer Orbit Stage =

Single-stage solid-fueled booster rocket

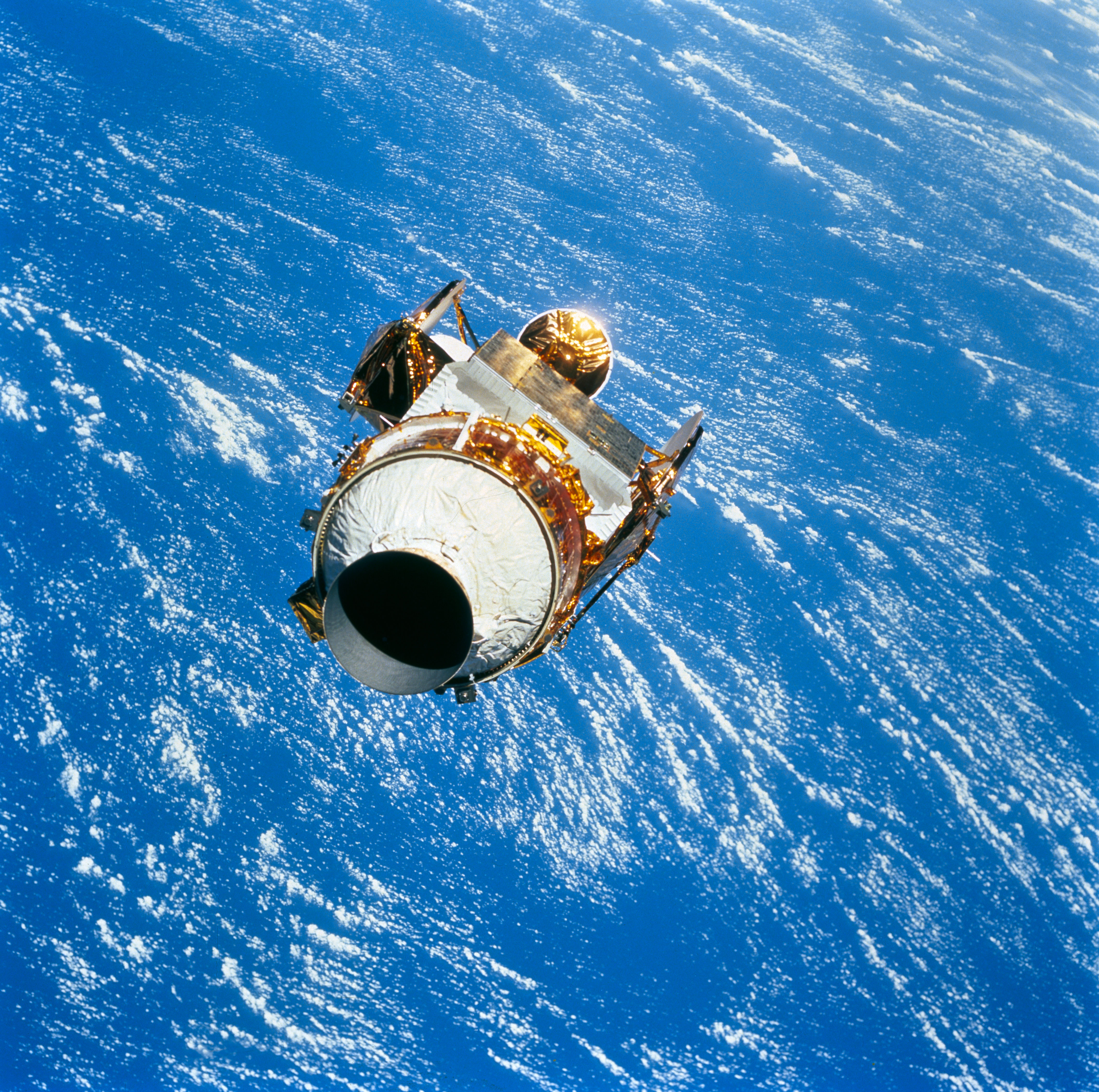
TOS with ACTS, seen from STS-51

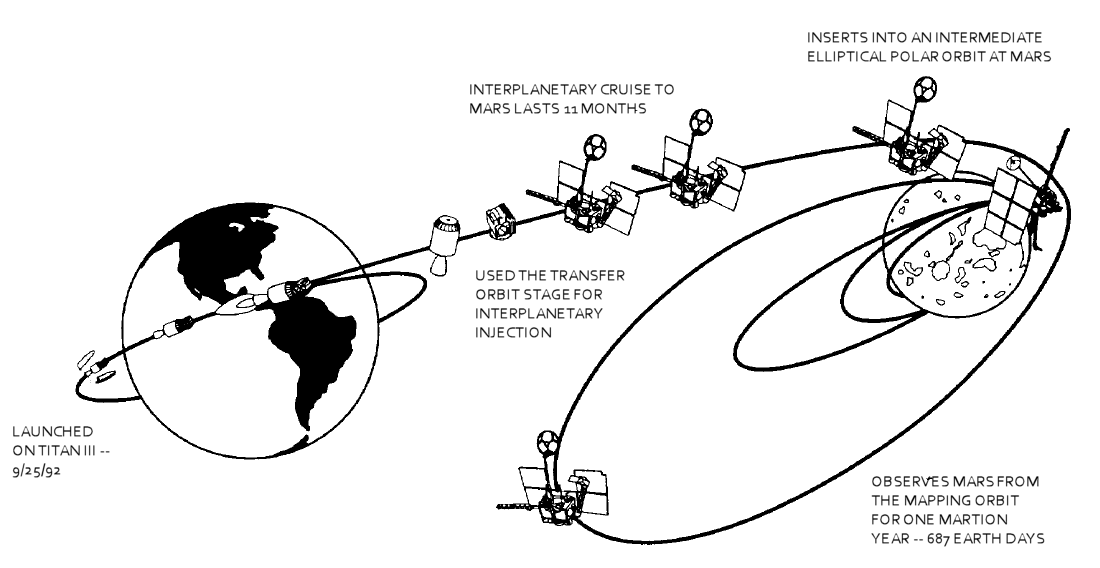
The planned trajectory of Mars Observer in this diagram also illustrates the purpose of the Transfer Orbit Stage. After the Commercial Titan III had transported on its upper stage the TOS and satellite into low Earth orbit, the fairing separated and the Transfer Orbit Stage accelerated the satellite in the direction of Mars.

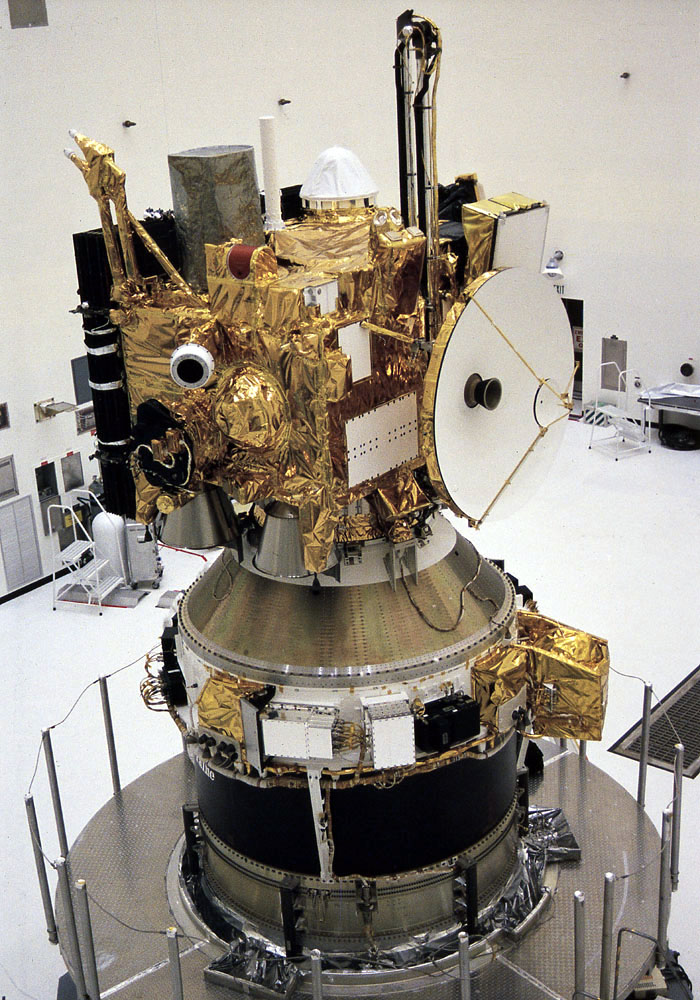
The preparation of Mars Observer and the Transfer Orbit Stage (TOS) before their integration with the upper stage of the Commercial Titan III

The Transfer Orbit Stage (TOS) was an upper stage developed by Martin Marietta for Orbital Sciences Corporation during the late 1980s and early 1990s. The TOS was designed to be a lower-cost alternative to Inertial Upper Stage (IUS) and Centaur G upper stages. The TOS was designed to be deployed by the Titan 34D, Commercial Titan III and Space Shuttle.

The main propulsion system of the Transfer Orbit Stage was an Orbus 21 solid rocket motor, similar to the one used in the first stage of IUS. Attitude control was provided by hydrazine thrusters. The inertial guidance system used a ring laser gyroscope produced by Honeywell. Its control system employed a digital optimal, time-scheduled control algorithm to provide stability whilst the Orbus 21 was burning, while a phase-plane controller was used to manage its reaction-control system.

Only two Transfer Orbit Stages were launched. The first was launched on 25 September 1992, aboard a Commercial Titan III with the Mars Observer spacecraft bound for Mars. Despite a successful launch, the Mars Observer spacecraft later malfunctioned. The second use of a TOS was the deployment of the Advanced Communications Technology Satellite from Space Shuttle Discovery on mission STS-51. This was also successful.

The Transfer Orbit Stage was designed to separate from the Space Shuttle via pyrotechnic devices enclosed in a frangible metal joint known as a Super*Zip. On STS-51, the primary and backup pyrotechnic devices inside the Super*Zip were erroneously fired simultaneously, resulting in minor damage to both the TOS, and the Shuttle's payload bay lining. However, the ACTS satellite deployed successfully and functioned normally on orbit. The Shuttle landed safely despite the anomaly.
