= ACTS Gigabit Satellite Network =

Prototype communications system

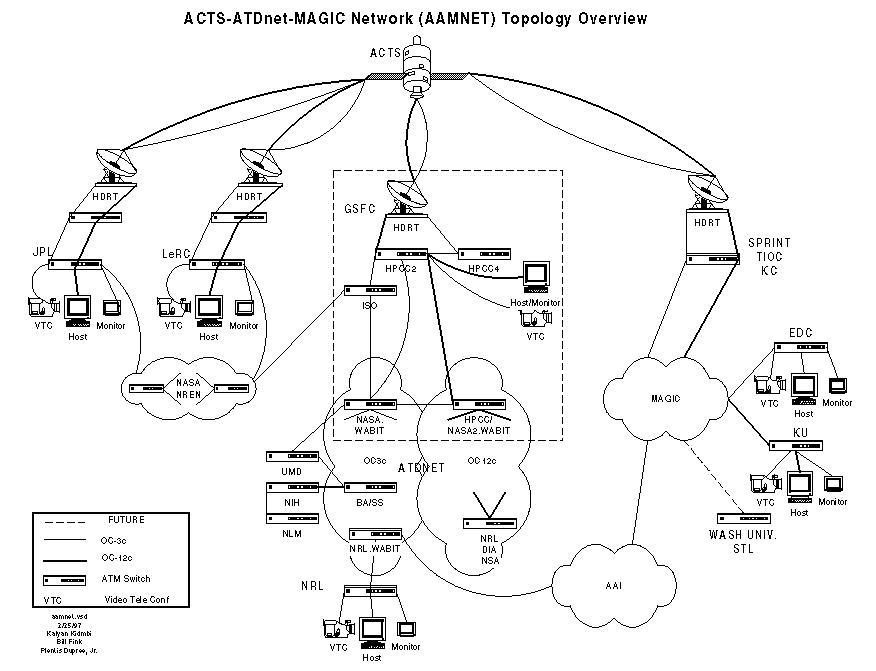
Diagram of the ACTS Gigabit Satellite Network within a larger context

The ACTS Gigabit Satellite Network was a pioneering, high-speed communications satellite network in the years 1993-2004, created as a prototype system to explore high-speed networking of digital endpoints. The system was jointly sponsored by NASA and ARPA, implemented by BBN Technologies and Motorola, and was inducted into the Space Technology Hall of Fame in April 1997.

The Advanced Communications Technology Satellite (ACTS) network was designed to provide fiber-compatible SONET service to remote nodes and networks through a wideband satellite system, and provided long-haul, point-to-point and point-to-multipoint full-duplex SONET services, at rates up to 622 Mbit/s, over NASA's Advanced Communication Technology Satellite (ACTS).

The Advanced Communications Technology Satellite itself, built and operated by Lockheed Martin, was launched on STS-51 on September 12, 1993, by the Space Shuttle Discovery, and occupied a geostationary orbit at 100° west longitude. It was the first communication satellite to operate in the 20–30 GHz frequency band (K_{a} band), with 30 GHz uplink and 20 GHz downlink signals. The satellite incorporated advanced on-board switching and multiple dynamically-hopping spot-beam antennas for selected areas of the United States including Hawaii. Up to 3 uplink and 3 downlink antenna beams could be active simultaneously.

The ACTS network ground terminals were transportable Gigabit Earth Stations (GES) with fiber-optic SONET interfaces (OC-3 and OC-12), which also supported the Asynchronous Transfer Mode (ATM) protocol suite. The network control and management functions are distributed in the various Gigabit Earth Stations, with the operator's interface being centralized in a Network Management Terminal (NMT), which could be collocated at a GES, or anywhere in the Internet.

The system was operational and used for experiments for 127 months, instead of the originally planned 24–48 months. In all, 53 terminals were built and used by more than 100 experimenters to test ACTS abilities. In Nov. 1997 a record data rate of 520 Mbit/s TCP/IP throughput was achieved using ATM between several ground stations via ACTS. On May 31, 2000 the ACTS experiments program officially came to a close, but the system continued to support experiments until it was deactivated on April 28, 2004.
