= William F. Readdy =

American test pilot, astronaut and manager (born 1952)

William Readdy
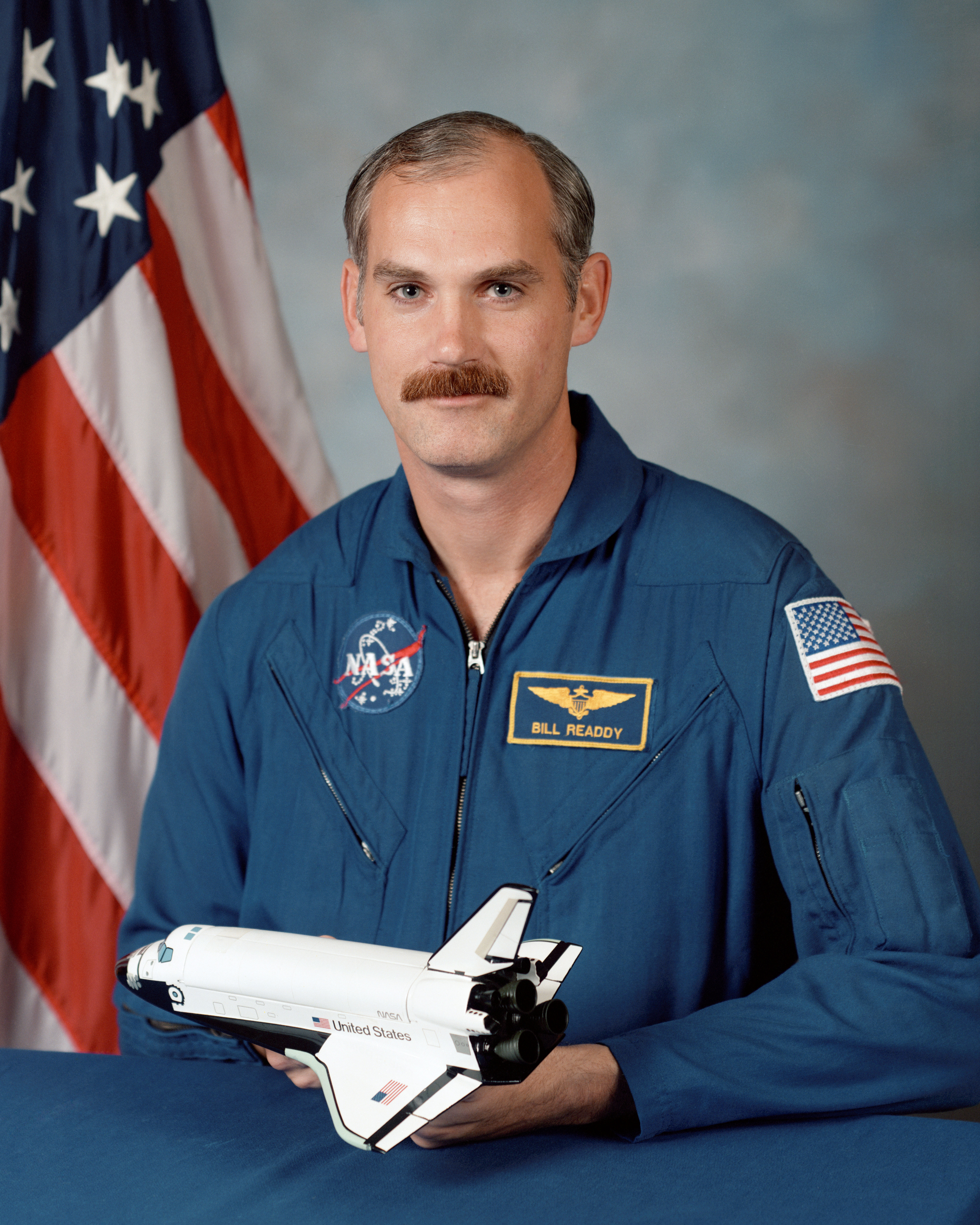
- Born: William Francis Readdy; January 24, 1952 (age 74); Quonset Point, Rhode Island, U.S.
- Education: United States Naval Academy (BS)
- Space career

NASA astronaut
- Rank: Captain, USN
- Time in space: 28d 0h 44m
- Selection: NASA Group 12 (1987)
- Missions: STS-42; STS-51; STS-79
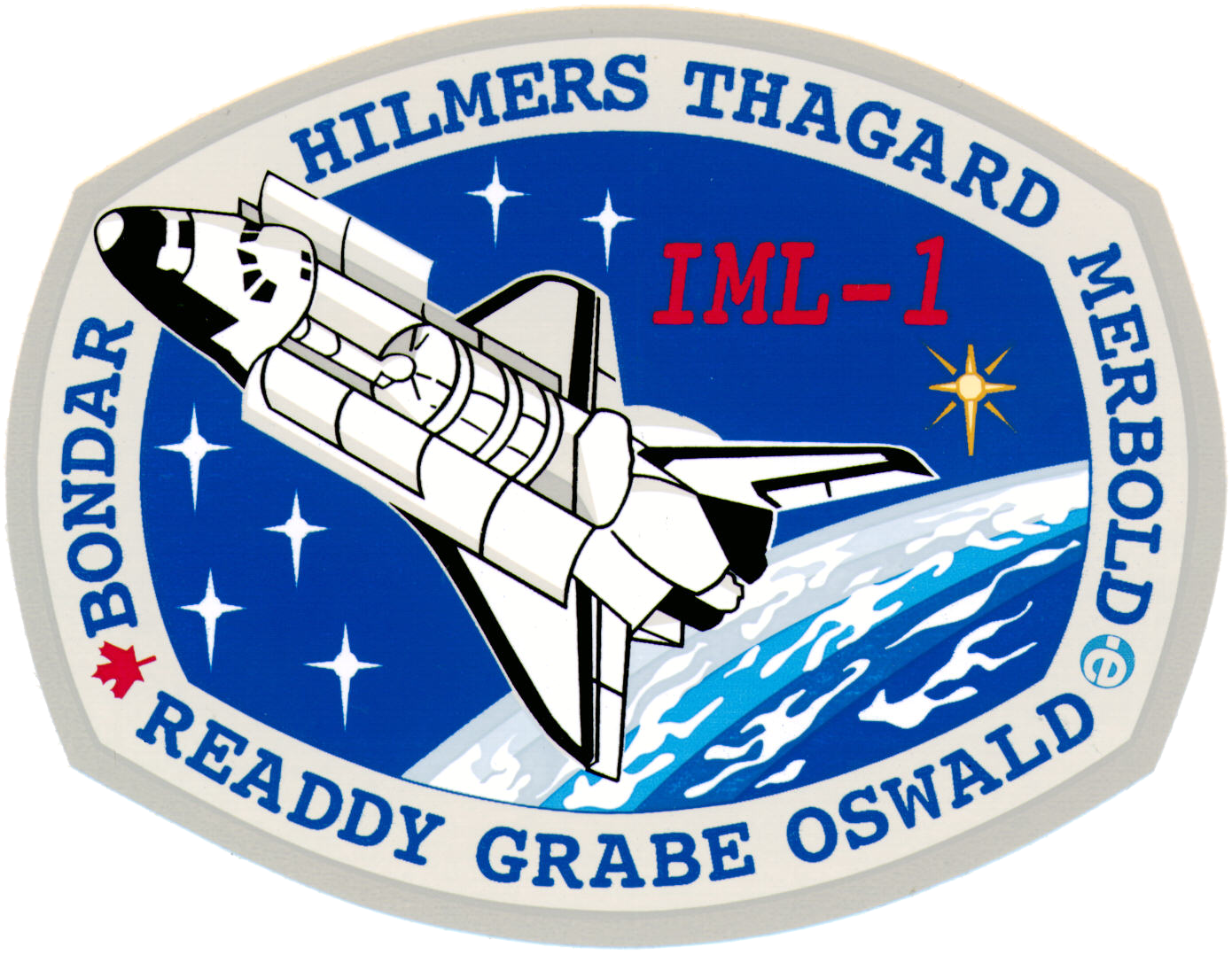
- Mission insignia

William Francis Readdy is a former associate administrator of the Office of Space Flight, at NASA Headquarters. He is also a veteran pilot astronaut of three space flights: STS-42, STS-51, and STS-79.

== Personal life ==
He was born January 24, 1952, in Quonset Point, Rhode Island, and is married to Colleen Nevius. They have two sons and a daughter.

He graduated from McLean High School, McLean, Virginia, in 1970 and received a Bachelor of Science degree in aerospace engineering (with honors) from the United States Naval Academy in 1974. He's a distinguished graduate of the United States Naval Test Pilot School 1980. Readdy is a Fellow of the Society of Experimental Test Pilots, the Explorers Club, and the Royal Astronautical Society and is an Associate Fellow of the AIAA. He also belongs to the Association of Space Explorers.

== Experience ==
Readdy graduated from Annapolis in 1974, and earned his wings as a Naval Aviator. Following fleet training in the A-6 Intruder at NAS Oceana, Virginia, he joined Attack Squadron Eighty-five aboard the aircraft carrier USS Forrestal deployed to the North Atlantic and Mediterranean from 1976 until 1980. Upon completion of the Naval Test Pilot School, he served as project test pilot on a variety of programs at Strike Aircraft Test Directorate. Following a tour as a test pilot instructor, he reported in 1984 to USS Coral Sea, on Caribbean and Mediterranean deployments. In 1986 Readdy transferred into the Naval Reserve to join NASA and served as an instructor pilot and unit commander until his naval retirement in August 2000. He has logged 7,000 flying hours in over 60 types of fixed wing and helicopters and over 550 carrier landings.

Readdy joined NASA's Johnson Space Center in October 1986 as a research pilot at Ellington Field, Houston, Texas, where he served as program manager for the highly modified Boeing 747 Shuttle Carrier Aircraft. He was selected as an astronaut in the 1987 Group. He served in numerous support roles including: Training Officer; Safety Officer; Operations Development Branch Chief; NASA Director of Operations, Star City, Russia; Stafford Task Force; and the first manager of Space Shuttle Program Development charged with upgrading the Space Shuttle.

Readdy is a veteran pilot astronaut with three space flights, STS-42 (January 22–30, 1992), STS-51 (September 12–22, 1993) and, most recently, STS-79 (September 16–26, 1996). Readdy has logged over 672 hours in space.

Readdy then served as Associate Administrator, NASA HQ Office of Space Flight that has oversight for the Marshall, Kennedy, Stennis and Johnson Space Centers as well as programmatic oversight for International Space Station, Space Shuttle, Space Communications and Space Launch Vehicles.

Readdy retired from NASA after 19 years of service on October 15, 2005.

== Post-NASA career ==
Readdy served on the board of directors of the Challenger Center for Space Science Education as Treasurer. In 2007, he was appointed chairman of the board of Challenger Center. Readdy is also currently a member of the board of directors of Astrobotic Technology, a Carnegie Mellon University spinoff company that is competing for the Google Lunar X Prize. In July 2018, Readdy was appointed to the Firefly Aerospace Advisory Board.

== Special honors ==
Recipient of the Legion of Merit, the Distinguished Flying Cross, the NASA Distinguished Service Medal, two NASA Outstanding Leadership Medals, two NASA Exceptional Service Medals, three NASA Space Flight Medals, the Meritorious Service Medal, the Navy Commendation Medal, Navy Achievement Medal, Navy Expeditionary Medal, two National Defense Service Medals, the Armed Forces Expeditionary Medal, Armed Forces Reserve Medal, and various unit and service awards. U.S. Naval Test Pilot School Instructor of the Year (1984). NASA Space Flight Safety Award. Federation Aeronautique Internationale awards include: the Kamarov Diploma (STS-51), the De la Vaulx Medal (STS-79) and a World Record Certificate (STS-79).
