= Planetary Observer program =

Cancelled NASA space exploration program

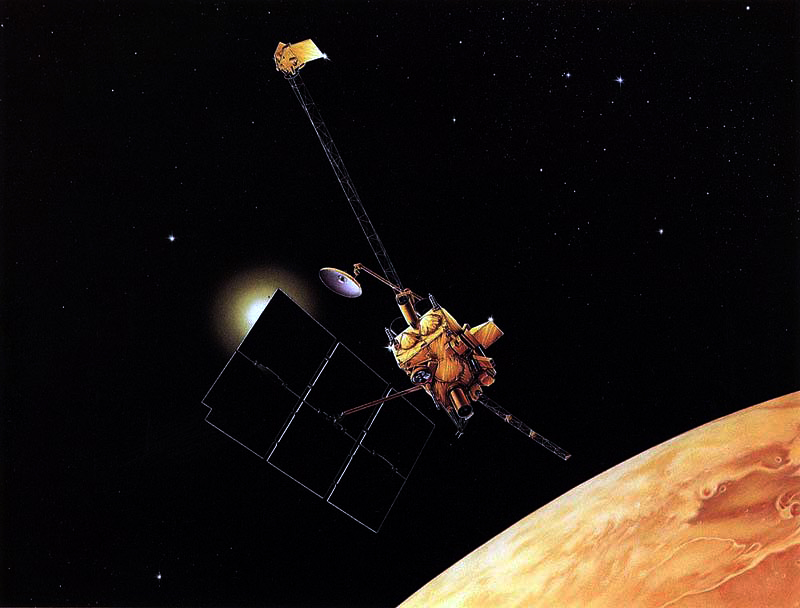
Mars Observer, a Planetary Observer class spacecraft.

The Planetary Observer program is a cancelled space exploration program designed by NASA to provide cheaper planetary orbiters by using Earth-orbiting satellite components and technology, using solar panels for power, and a common spacecraft bus platform for all Planetary Observer-class probes. Only one spacecraft of this class was eventually constructed—the Mars Observer.

== History ==
After the flagship multibillion-dollar missions of the 1970s, in the 1980s NASA was looking for a new, more affordable direction for the 1990s and beyond. Two projects were conceived by NASA's Solar System Exploration Committee in 1983, the Planetary Observer program and Mariner Mark II. The Observer program, starting with Mars Observer, was envisioned as a series of low-cost missions to the inner Solar System, based on commercial Earth satellites. The Mariner Mark II, on the other hand, was to be a series of large spacecraft for the exploration of the outer Solar System.

The first Planetary Observer spacecraft to be approved was Mars Observer, in 1985. Lunar Observer (LO), proposed for a 1997 launch, would have been sent into a long-term lunar orbit at 60 miles above the Moon's poles. The Mercury Observer (MO) was also proposed for a 1997 launch. However, congressionally imposed reductions to FY 1992-93 funding requirements forced NASA to terminate the Planetary Observer program, with just Mars Observer funded.

=== Mars Observer ===
Mars Observer was a robotic spacecraft designed to study the geoscience and climate of Mars. The first of the proposed Observer series of planetary missions, it was launched by NASA on September 25, 1992. Three days before Mars Observer was scheduled to enter the orbit of Mars, contact with the spacecraft was lost. Attempts to re-establish communication with the spacecraft were unsuccessful.

A few photographs were indeed taken, and these were the bulk of data collected.

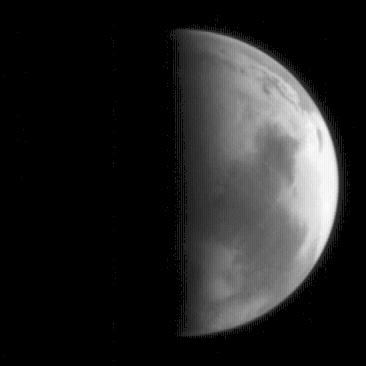
First image of Mars taken by MOC on July 27, 1993.

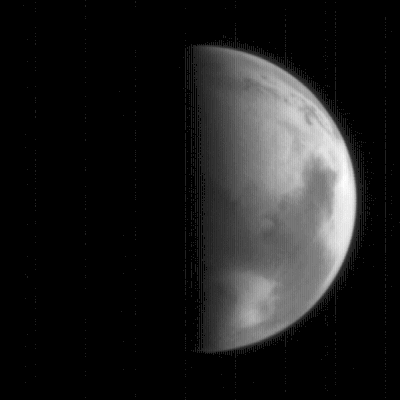
Second MOC image of Mars, acquired one hour after the first.

One of few wide-angle images by Mars Observer that were in color.

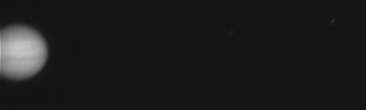
Jupiter as imaged by MOC en route to Mars.

=== Lunar Observer ===
The Lunar Observer program was started with an estimated budget of US$500–700 million. The proposed orbit was 70 km (43 mi) above the surface. The Lunar Observer spacecraft garnered some attention from the Soviet Union, and there was a suggestion that they might cooperate with NASA to field some instruments for it.

Lunar Observer was proposed for FY1991 at US$188 million by President George H.W. Bush.
