= Mars Observer =

Failed NASA orbiter mission to Mars (1992–1993)

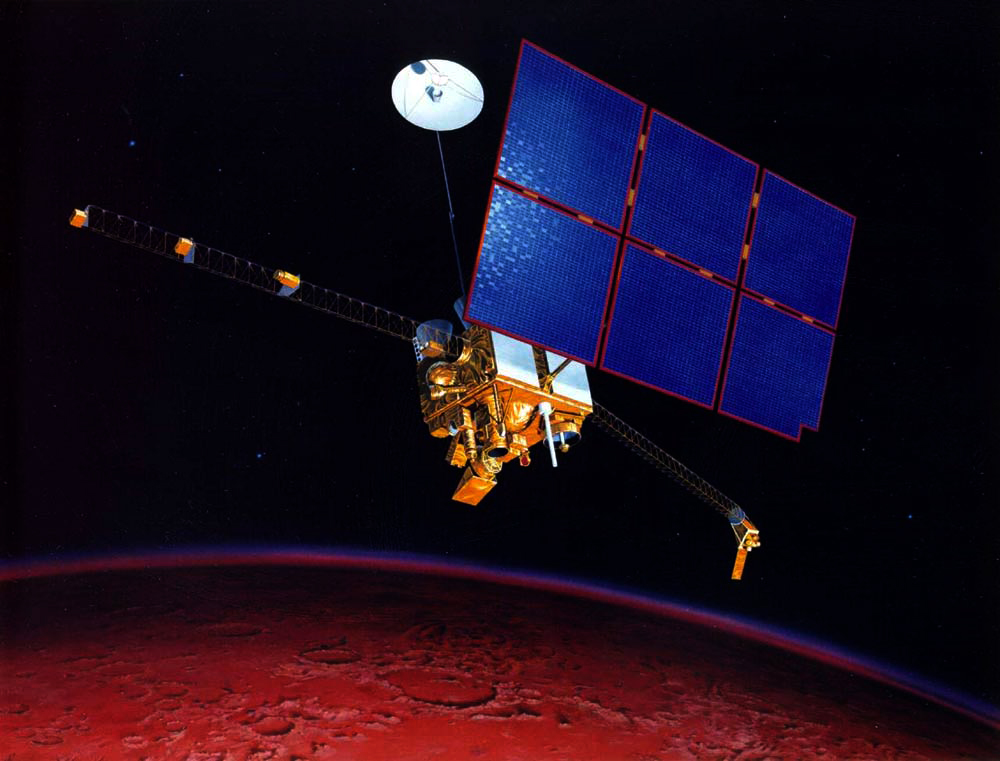
- Artist rendering of Mars Observer in orbit around Mars
- Names: Mars Geoscience Climatology Orbiter
- Mission type: Mars orbiter
- Operator: NASA / JPL
- COSPAR ID: 1992-063A
- SATCAT no.: 22136
- Website: science.nasa.gov
- Mission duration: 330 days Mission failure

Spacecraft properties
- Bus: Mars Observer bus (AS-4000-TIROS/DMSP hybrid)
- Manufacturer: General Electric; Astro Space
- Launch mass: 1,018 kg (2,244 lb)
- Power: 1,147 watts

Start of mission
- Launch date: September 25, 1992, 17:05:01 UTC
- Rocket: Commercial Titan III/TOS
- Launch site: Cape Canaveral LC-40
- Contractor: Martin Marietta

End of mission
- Last contact: August 21, 1993, 01:00 UTC

Orbital parameters
- Reference system: Areocentric
- Semi-major axis: 3,766.159 km (2,340.183 mi)
- Eccentricity: 0.004049
- Inclination: 92.869°
- Epoch: December 6, 1993; Planned

Flyby of Mars (failed insertion)
- Closest approach: August 24, 1993

Mars Observer was an American robotic space probe launched by NASA on September 25, 1992, to study the surface, atmosphere, climate and magnetic field of Mars. The spacecraft was developed and managed by the Jet Propulsion Laboratory.

The project originated with a 1984 proposal for a new Mars mission, originally titled the Mars Geoscience Climatology Orbiter. As the first and ultimately only mission in the Planetary Observer program, its design was based on earlier Earth-orbiting satellites, including the TIROS and DMSP series. Seven scientific instruments were included.

On August 21, 1993, during the interplanetary cruise phase, communication with Mars Observer was lost, three days prior to its scheduled orbital insertion around Mars. Attempts to re-establish communications with the spacecraft were unsuccessful. Investigators concluded that the likely cause of the failure was a rupture of the fuel pressurization tank in the spacecraft's propulsion system. Several instruments designed for Mars Observer, including the Mars Orbiter Camera, were successfully flown on subsequent missions, beginning with Mars Global Surveyor in 1996.

== Mission background ==
=== History ===
In October 1984, NASA approved a new mission to Mars, considered high priority by the Solar System Exploration Committee. The original name of the mission was the Mars Geoscience Climatology Orbiter, emphasizing the scientific goals of geology, geophysics and climatology. The Martian orbiter was planned to expand on the information already gathered by the Viking program. Preliminary mission goals expected the probe to provide planetary magnetic field data, detection of certain spectral line signatures of minerals on the surface, images of the surface at 1 meter/pixel and global elevation data. The Jet Propulsion Laboratory managed the project for NASA, and was responsible for mission design, acquisition of science instruments, and direction of flight operations.

Mars Observer was originally planned to be launched in 1990 by a Space Shuttle orbiter. The possibility for an expendable rocket to be used was also suggested, if the spacecraft was designed to meet certain constraints. On March 12, 1987, the mission was rescheduled for launch in 1992, with NASA citing budget concerns over the cost of the launch vehicle. Other missions that had been backlogged after the Space Shuttle Challenger disaster, including Galileo, Magellan, and Ulysses, were given priority. Along with a launch delay, budget overruns necessitated the elimination of two instruments to meet the 1992 planned launch: a mapping spectrometer was removed for programmatic reasons, and a laser altimeter was substituted for the original, more complex radar altimeter. As the development matured, the primary science objectives were finalized as:

- Determine the global elemental and mineralogical character of the surface material.
- Define globally the topography and gravitational field.
- Establish the nature of the Martian magnetic field.
- Determine the temporal and spatial distribution, abundance, sources, and sinks of volatiles and dust over a seasonal cycle.
- Explore the structure and circulation of the atmosphere.

The program's total cost was estimated at $813 million.

=== Spacecraft design ===
The Mars Observer spacecraft had a mass of 1,018 kilograms (2,244 lb). Its bus measured 1.1 meters tall, 2.2 meters wide, and 1.6 meters deep. The spacecraft was based on previous satellite designs that were originally intended and developed to orbit Earth. The RCA AS-4000 Ku-band satellite design was used extensively for the spacecraft bus, propulsion, thermal protection, and solar array. RCA TIROS and DMSP Block 50-2 satellite designs were also utilized in implementing the Attitude and Articulation Control System (AACS), command and data handling subsystem, and power subsystem, into Mars Observer. Other elements such as the bipropellant components and high-gain antenna were designed specifically for the mission.

==== Attitude control and propulsion ====
The spacecraft was three-axis stabilized with four reaction wheels and twenty-four thrusters with 1,346 kilograms of propellant. The propulsion system used a high thrust, monomethyl hydrazine/nitrogen tetroxide bipropellant system for larger maneuvers and a lower thrust hydrazine monopropellant system for minor orbital corrections during the mission. Of the bipropellant thrusters, four located on the aft provided 490 newtons of thrust for course corrections, control of the spacecraft during the Mars orbital insertion maneuver and large orbit corrections during the mission; another four, located on along the sides of the spacecraft, provided 22 newtons for controlling roll maneuvers. Of the hydrazine thrusters, eight provided 4.5 newtons to control orbit trim maneuvers; another eight provided 0.9 newtons for offsetting, or "desaturating", the reaction wheels. To determine the orientation of the spacecraft, a horizon sensor, a 6-slit star scanner, and five Sun sensors were included.

==== Communications ====
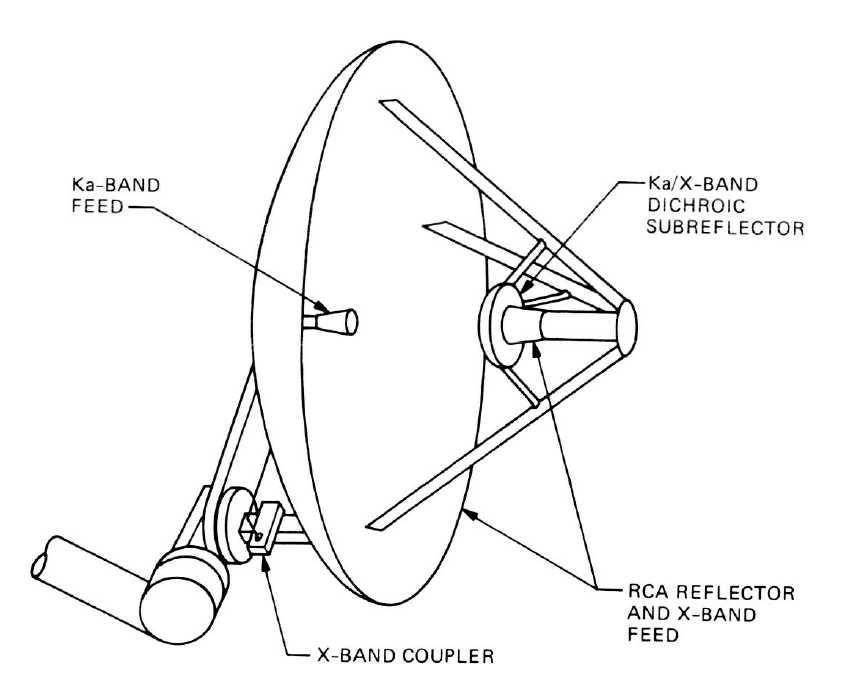
Proposed X/Ka band antenna (1986)

For telecommunications, the spacecraft included a two-axis gimbaled 1.5 meter, parabolic high-gain antenna, mounted to a 6 meter boom to communicate with the Deep Space Network across the X-band using two GFP NASA X-band transponders (NXTs) and two GFP command detector units (CDUs). An assembly of six low-gain antennas, and a single medium-gain antenna were also included, to be used during the cruise phase while the high-gain antenna remained stowed, and for contingency measures should communications through the high-gain antenna become restricted. When broadcasting to the Deep Space Network, a maximum of 10.66 kilobytes/second could be achieved while the spacecraft could receive commands at a maximum bandwidth of 62.5 bytes per second.

There was also a research payload, the Mars Observer Ka-Band Link Experiment (KABLE), designed to measure performance for possible future missions at Ka-band. It was very low power, intended only for measurements and not operational use.

==== Power ====
Power was supplied to the spacecraft through a six-panel solar array, measuring 7.0 meters wide and 3.7 meters tall, which would provide an average of 1,147 watts when in orbit. To power the spacecraft while occluded from the Sun, two 42 A·h nickel-cadmium batteries were included; the batteries would recharge as the solar array received sunlight.

==== Computer ====
The computing system on the spacecraft was a retooling of the system used on the TIROS and DMSP satellites. The semiautonomous system was able to store up to 2,000 commands in the included 64 kilobytes of RAM, and execute them at a maximum rate of 12.5 commands/second; commands could also provide sufficient autonomous operation of the spacecraft for up to sixty days. To record data, two digital tape recorders (DTR) manufactured by Odetics were included, each of which were capable of storing up to 187.5 megabytes for later playback to the Deep Space Network.

==== Scientific instruments ====
Mars Observer Camera (MOC)
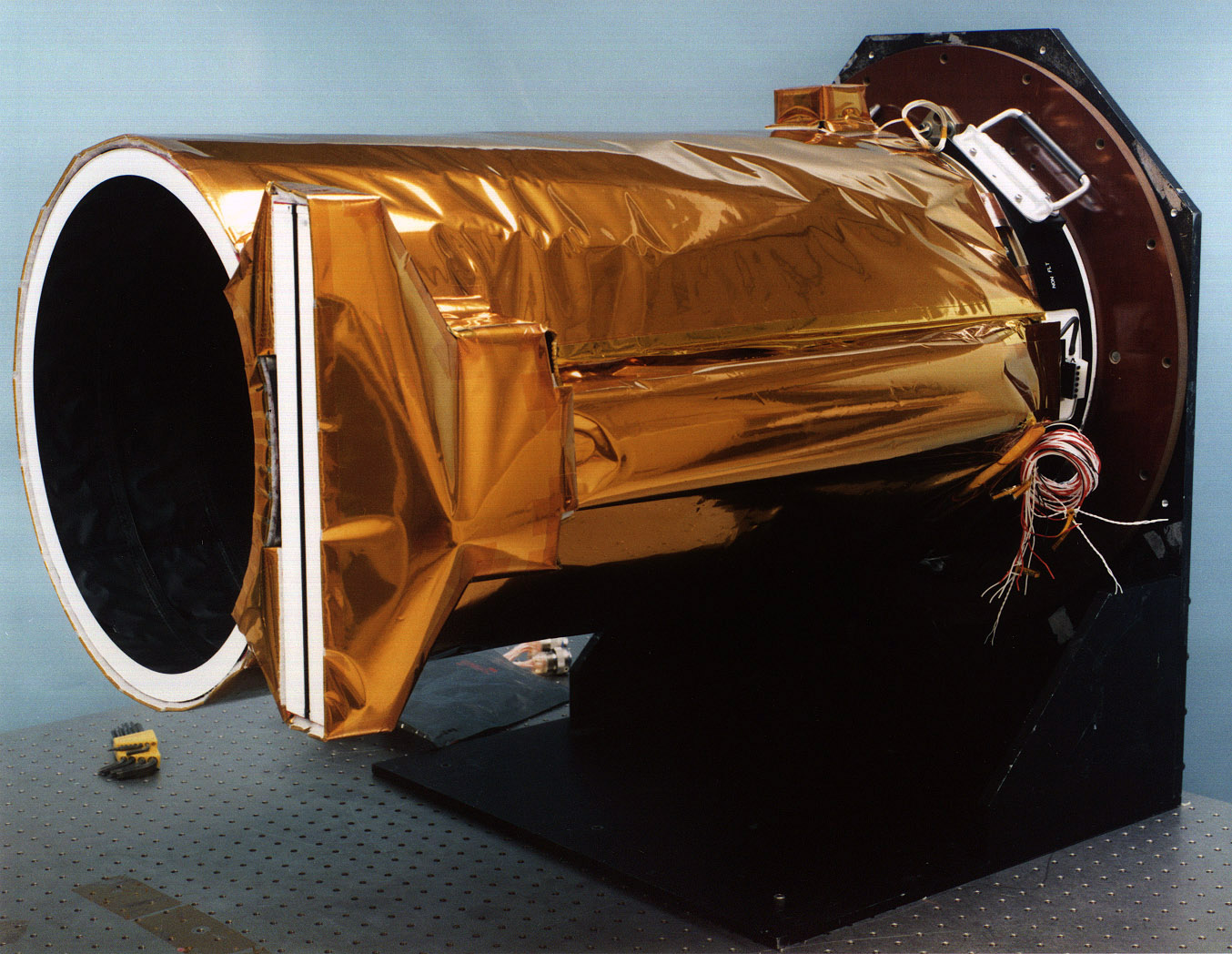
-see diagram

Objectives
- Obtain global synoptic views of the Martian atmosphere and surface to study meteorological, climatological, and related surface changes.
- Monitor surface and atmosphere features at moderate resolution for changes on time scales of hours, days, weeks, months and years.
- Systematically examine local areas at extremely high spatial resolution in order to quantify surface/atmosphere interactions and geological processes.

Consists of narrow-angle and wide-angle telescopic cameras to study the meteorology/climatology and geoscience of Mars.

- Principal investigator: Michael Malin / Arizona State University (website)
- reincorporated on Mars Global Surveyor

Mars Observer Laser Altimeter (MOLA)
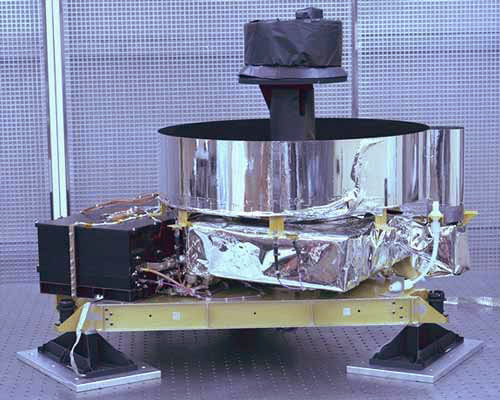
-see diagram

Objectives
- Provide topographic height measurements with a vertical resolution better than 0.5% of the elevation change within the footprint.
- Provide RMS slope information over the footprint.
- Provide surface brightness temperatures at 13.6 GHz with a precision of better than 2.5K.
- Provide well sampled radar return wave forms for precise range corrections and the characterization of surface properties.

A laser altimeter used to define the topography of Mars.

- Principal investigator: David Smith / NASA Goddard Space Flight Center
- reincorporated on Mars Global Surveyor

Thermal Emission Spectrometer (TES)
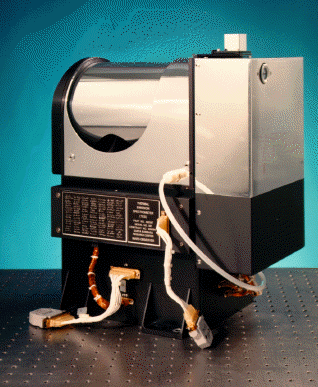
-see diagram

Objectives
- Determine and map the composition of surface minerals, rocks and ice.
- Study the composition, particle size, and spatial and tempora distribution of atmospheric dust.
- Locate water-ice and carbon dioxide condensate clouds and determine their temperature, height and condensate abundance.
- Study the growth, retreat and total energy balance of the polar cap deposits.
- Measure the thermophysical properties of the Martian surface (thermal inertia, albedo) used to derive surface particle size and rock abundance.
- Determine atmospheric temperature, pressure, water vapor, and ozone profiles, and seasonal pressure variations.

Uses three sensors (Michelson interferometer, solar reflectance sensor, broadband radiance sensor) to measure thermal infrared emissions to map the mineral content of surface rocks, frosts and the composition of clouds.

- Principal investigator: Philip Christensen / Arizona State University
- reincorporated on Mars Global Surveyor

Pressure Modulator Infrared Radiometer (PMIRR)
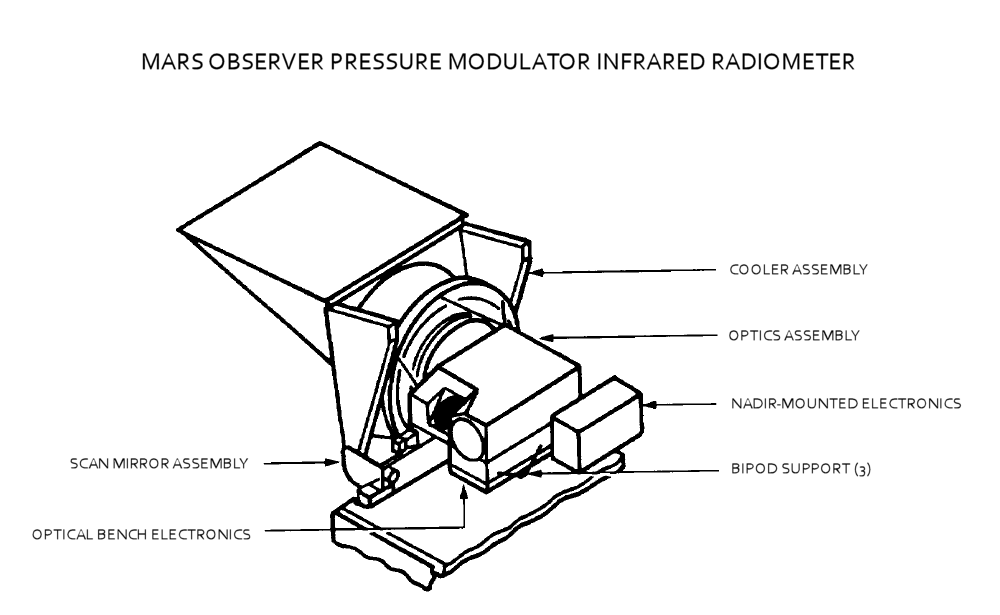

Objectives
- Map the three-dimensional and time-varying thermal structure of the atmosphere from the surface to 80 km altitude.
- Map the atmospheric dust loading and its global, vertical and temporal variation.
- Map the seasonal and spatial variation of the vertical distribution of atmospheric water vapor to an altitude of at least 35 km.
- Distinguish between atmospheric condensates and map their spatial and temporal variation.
- Map the seasonal and spatial variability of atmospheric pressure.
- Monitor the polar radiation balance.

Uses narrow-band radiometric channels and two pressure modulation cells to measure atmospheric and surface emissions in the thermal infrared and a visible channel to measure dust particles and condensates in the atmosphere and on the surface at varying longitudes and seasons.

- Principal investigator: Daniel McCleese / JPL
- reincorporated on Mars Climate Orbiter and then further developed and flown on Mars Reconnaissance Orbiter

Gamma Ray Spectrometer (GRS)
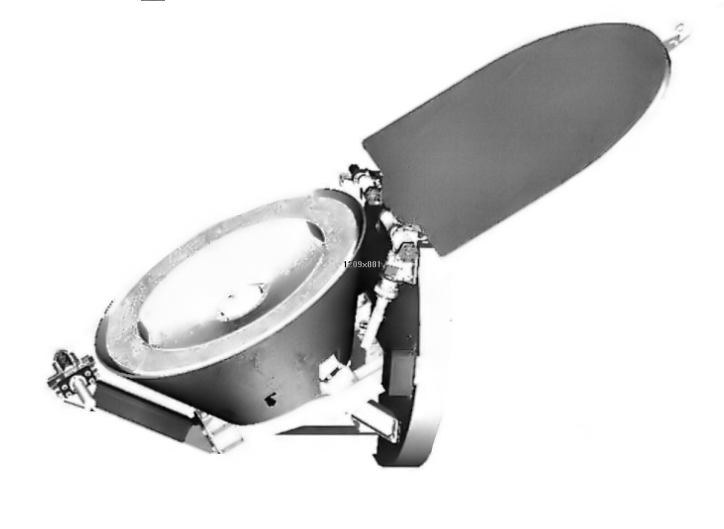
-see diagram

Objectives
- Determine the elemental composition of the surface of Mars with a spatial resolution of a few hundred kilometers through measurements of incident gamma-rays and albedo neutrons (H, 0, Mg, Al, Si, S, Cl, K, Fe, Th, U).
- Determine hydrogen depth dependence in the top tens of centimeters.
- Determine the atmospheric column density.
- Determine the arrival time and spectra of gamma-ray bursts.

Records the spectrum of gamma rays and neutrons emitted by the radioactive decay of elements contained in the Martian surface.

- Principal investigator: William Boynton / University of Arizona / NASA Goddard Space Flight Center (HEASARC website)
- reincorporated on 2001 Mars Odyssey

Magnetometer and Electron Reflectometer (MAG/ER)
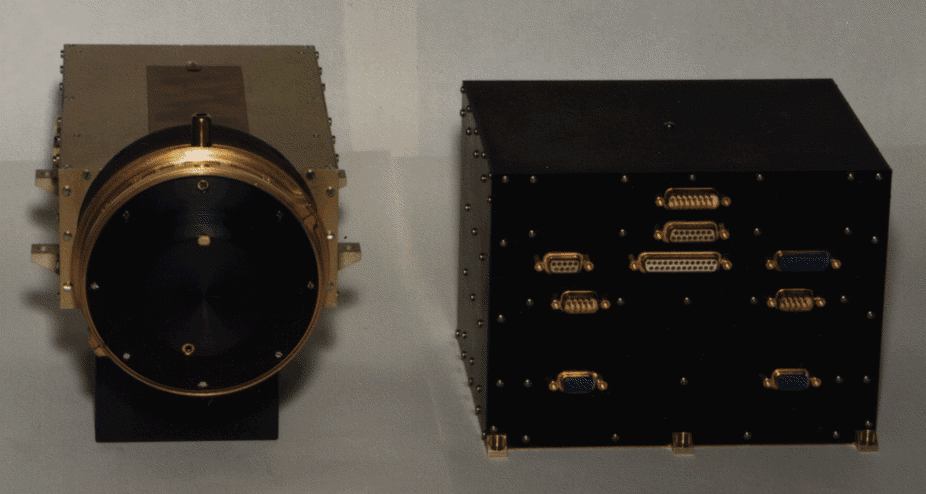

Objectives
- Establish the nature of the magnetic field of Mars.
- Develop models for its representation, which take into account the internal sources of magnetism and the effects of the interaction with the solar wind.
- Map the Martian crustal remanlint field using the fluxgate sensors and extend these in-situ measurements with the remote capability of the electron-reflectometer sensor.
- Characterize the solar wind/Mars plasma interaction.
- Remotely sense the Martian ionosphere.

Uses the components of the on-board telecommunications system and the stations of the Deep Space Network to collect data on the nature of the magnetic field and interactions the field may have with solar wind.

- Principal investigator: Mario Acuna / NASA Goddard Space Flight Center
- reincorporated on Mars Global Surveyor

Radio Science experiment (RS)
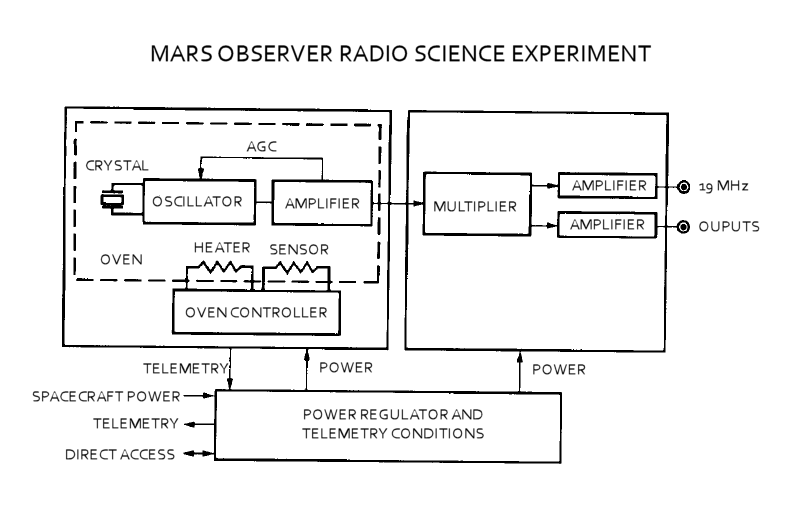

Objectives
Atmosphere
- Determine profiles of refractive index, number density, temperature, and pressure at the natural experimental resolution (approx. 200 m) for the lowest few scale heights at high latitudes in both hemispheres on a daily basis.
- Monitor both short term and seasonal variation in atmospheric stratification.
- Characterize the thermal response of the atmosphere to dust loading.
- Explore the thermal structure of the boundary layer at high vertical resolution (approx. 10 m).
- Determine the height and peak plasma density of the daytime ionosphere.
- Characterize the small scale structure of the atmosphere and ionosphere.
Gravity
- Develop a global, high-resolution model for the gravitational field.
- Determine both local and broad scale density structure and stress state of the Martian crust and upper mantle.
- Detect and measure temporal changes in low degree harmonics of the gravitational field.

Collects data on the gravity field and the Martian atmospheric structure with a special emphasis on temporal changes near the polar regions.

- Principal investigator: G. Tyler / Stanford University
- reincorporated on Mars Global Surveyor

Mars Balloon Relay (MBR)

Planned as augmentation to return data from the penetrators and surface stations of the Russian Mars '94 mission and from penetrators, surface stations, a rover, and a balloon from the Mars '96 mission.

- Principal investigator: Jacques Blamont / Centre National de la Recherche Scientifique
- reincorporated on Mars Global Surveyor

Images of the spacecraft
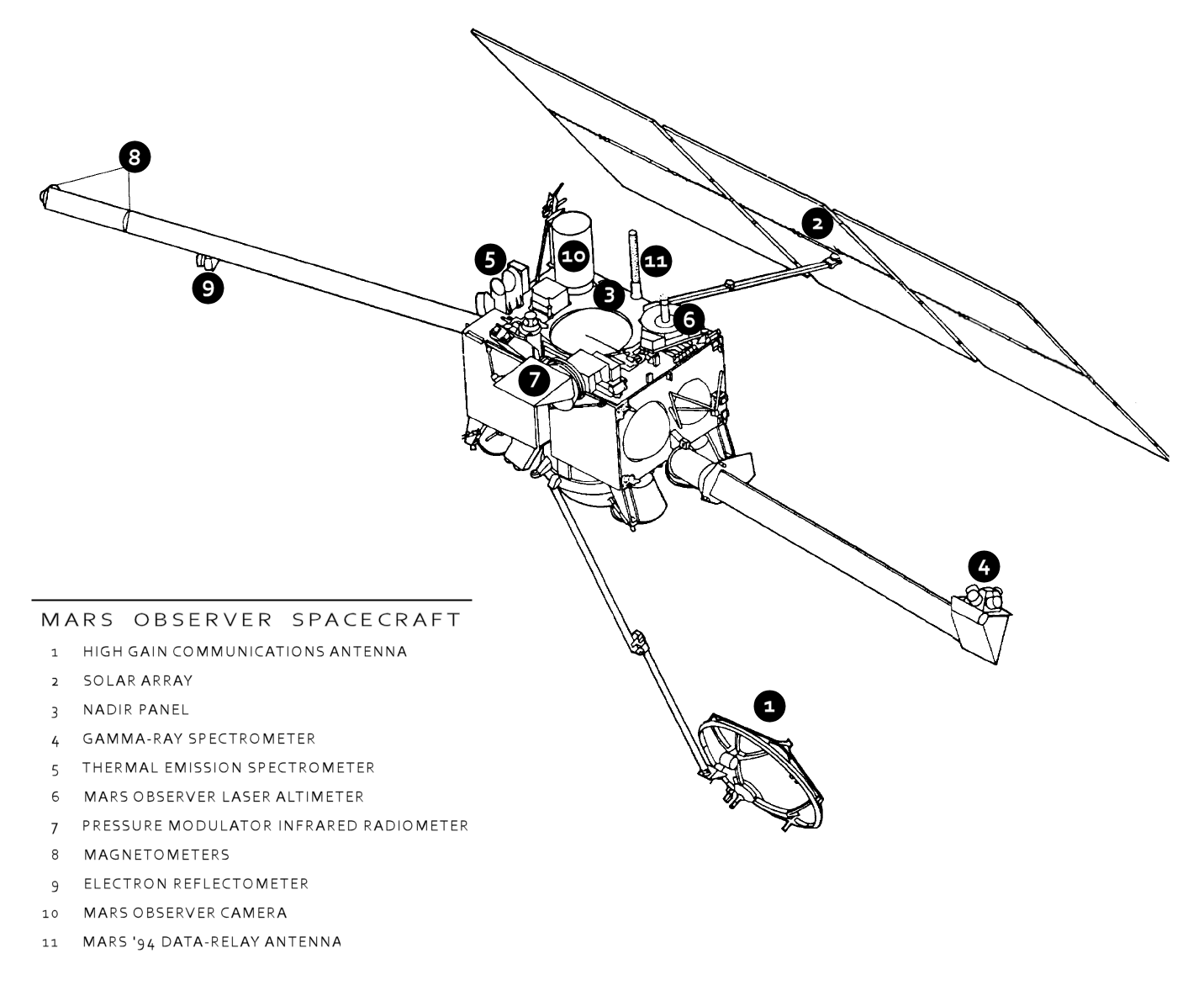
Labeled diagram of Mars Observer.

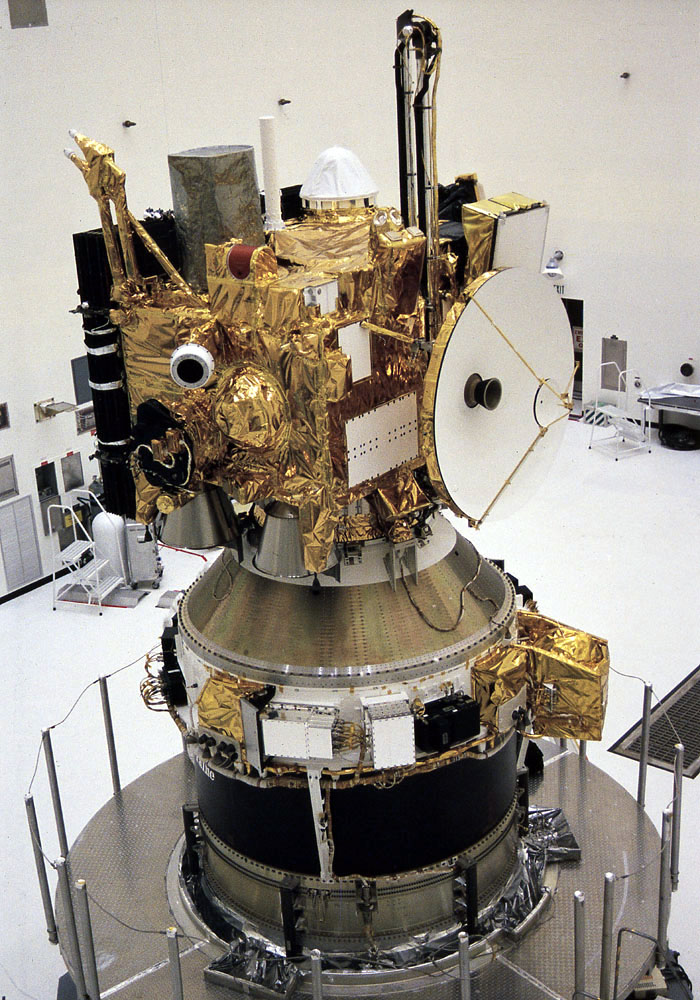
Mars Observer in the Payload Hazardous Servicing Facility.

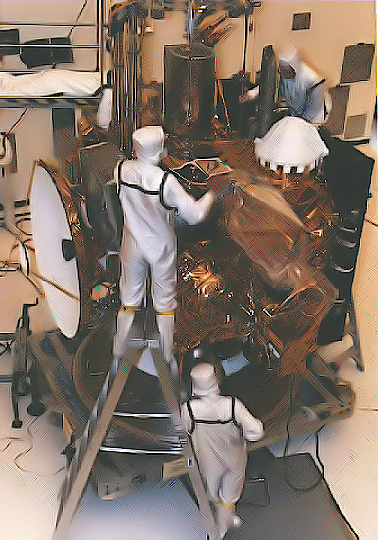
Technician assembling the Mars Observer space probe.

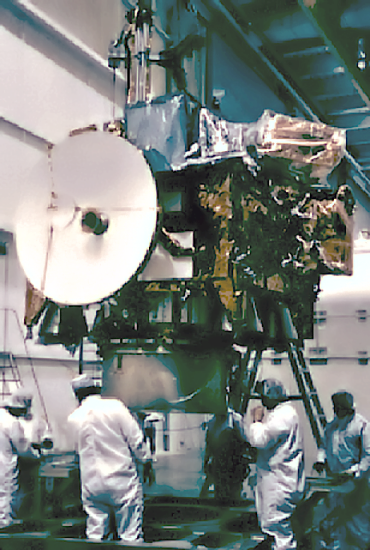
Mars Observer in the clean room.

== Mission profile ==
Timeline of operations

Date
Event

1992-09-25
Spacecraft launched at 17:05:01 UTC
1993-08-21
Communication with spacecraft lost at 01:00 UTC.
1993-08-24

Begin Mars orbital insertion maneuvers
Time	Event
1993-08-24	Mars Orbit Insertion maneuver
1993-09-04	Elliptical Change Maneuver-1
1993-09-04	Elliptical Change Maneuver-2
1993-09-16	Elliptical Change Maneuver-3
1993-10-17	Transfer to Low Orbit maneuver-1
1993-10-18	Transfer to Low Orbit maneuver-2

1993-09-27
Mission declared a loss. No further attempts to contact.
1993-12-17
Begin mapping phase

See the anticipated timeline for the Mars Observer mission.
Items in red were unrealized events.

=== Preparations for launch ===
On August 25, 1992, particulate contamination was found within the spacecraft. After a full inspection, a cleaning was determined necessary and was performed on August 29. The suspected cause of the contamination were measures taken to protect the spacecraft prior to the landfall of Hurricane Andrew which struck the coast of Florida on August 24.

=== Launch and trajectory ===
Mars Observer was launched on September 25, 1992, at 17:05:01 UTC by the National Aeronautics and Space Administration from Space Launch Complex 40 at the Cape Canaveral Air Force Station in Florida, aboard a Commercial Titan III CT-4 launch vehicle. The complete burn sequence lasted for 34 minutes after a solid propellant Transfer Orbit Stage placed the spacecraft into an 11-month, Mars transfer trajectory, at a final speed of 5.28 km/s with respect to Mars.

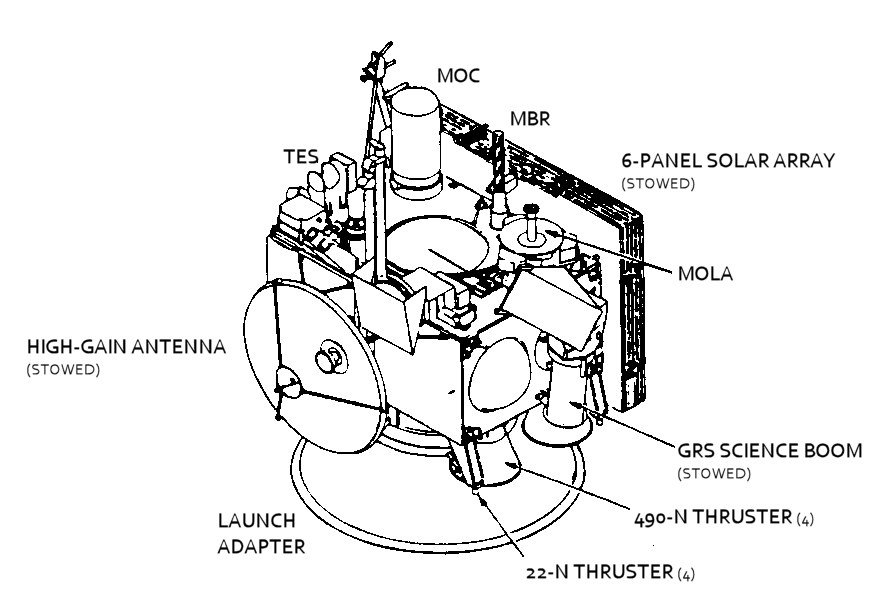
Diagram of Mars Observer in launch configuration.

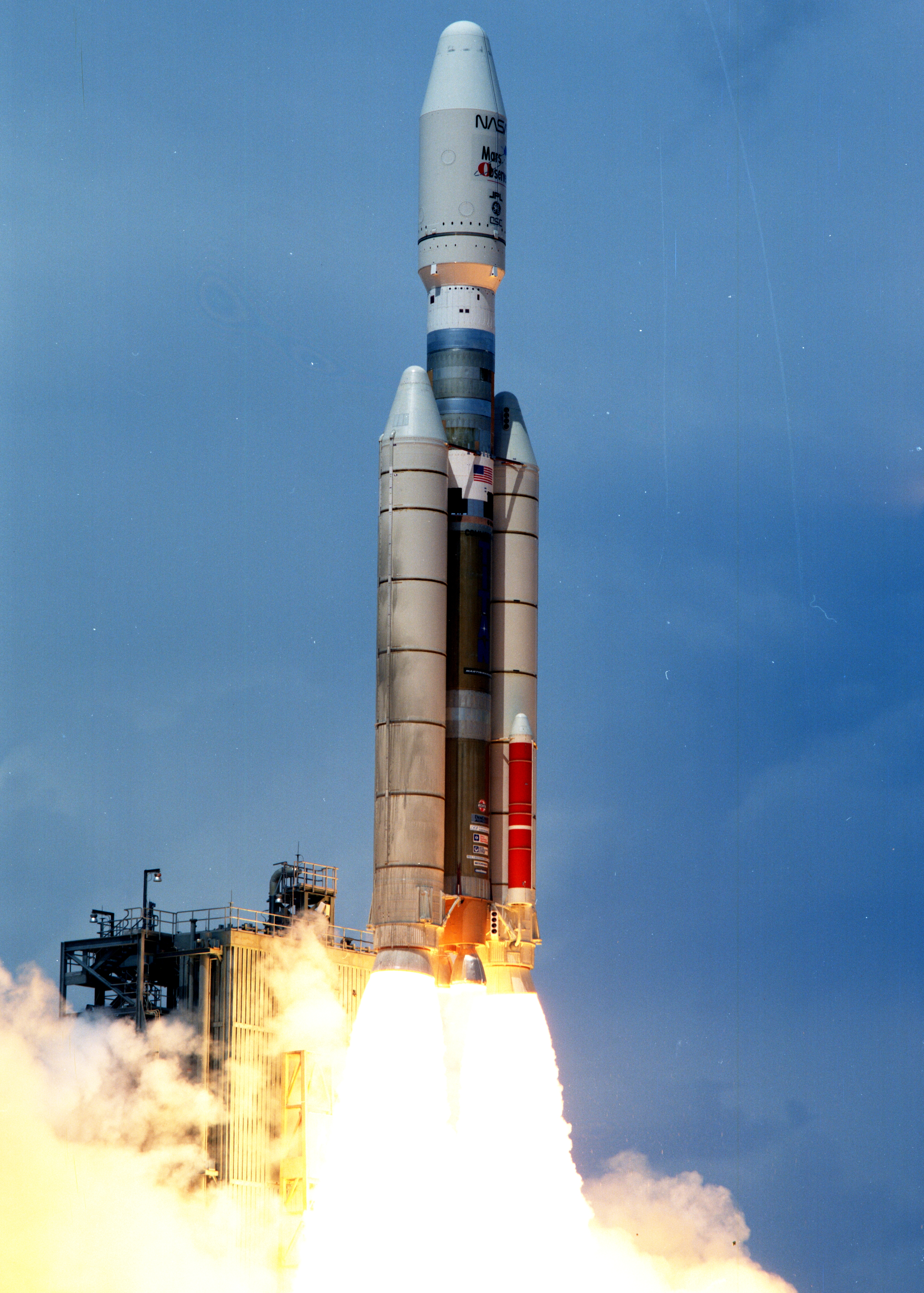
Titan III vehicle launching the Mars Observer spacecraft.

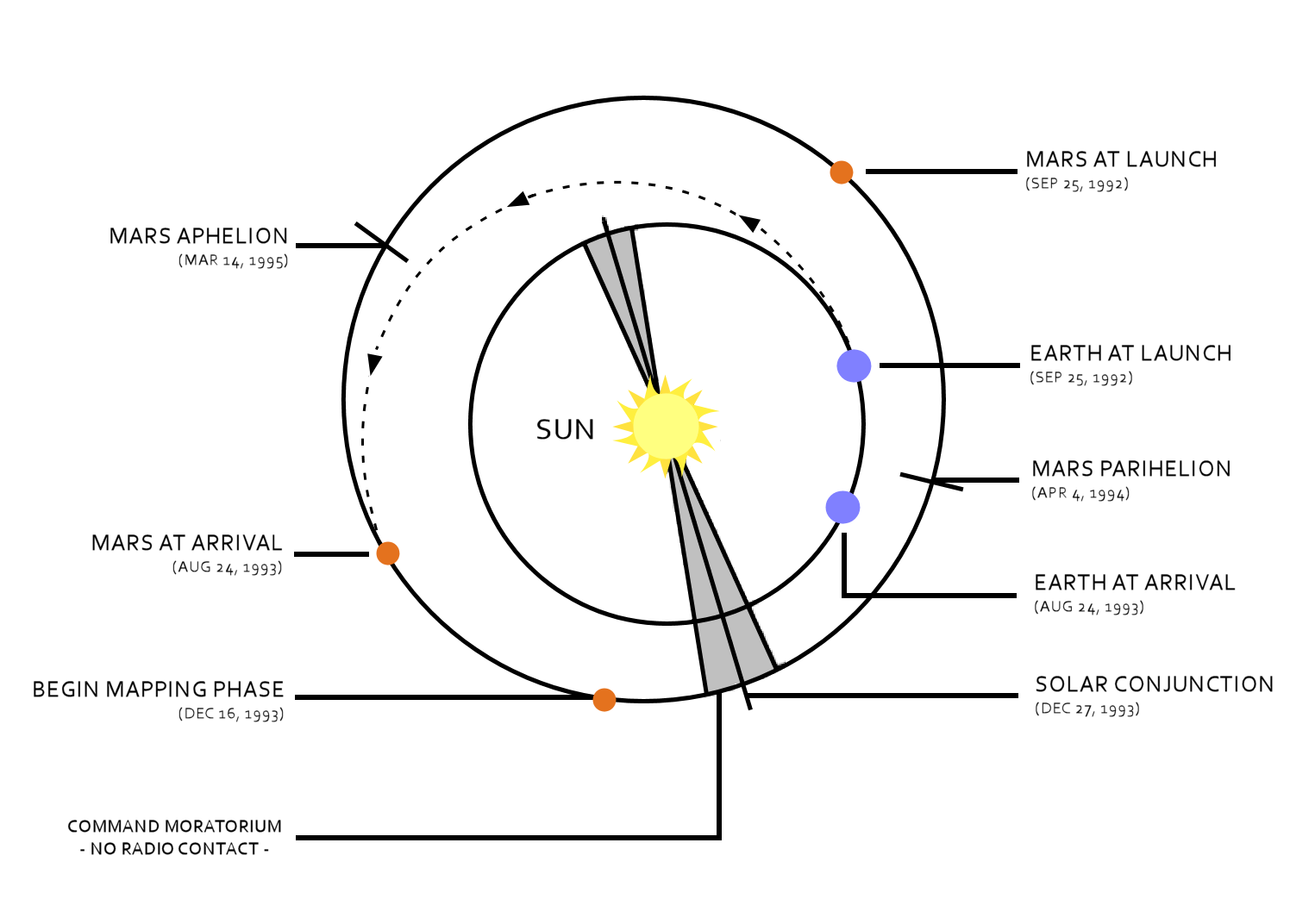
Diagram of the interplanetary trajectory of Mars Observer.

=== Encounter with Mars ===
Mars Observer was scheduled to perform an orbital insertion maneuver on August 24, 1993, but contact with the spacecraft was lost on August 21, 1993. The likely reason for the spacecraft failure was the leakage of fuel and oxidizer vapors through the improperly designed PTFE check valve to the common pressurization system. During interplanetary cruise, the vapor mix had accumulated in feed lines and pressurant lines, resulting in explosion and their rupture after the engine was restarted for routine course correction. Although none of the primary objectives were achieved, the mission provided interplanetary cruise phase data, collected up to the date of last contact. This data would be useful for subsequent missions to Mars. Science instruments originally developed for Mars Observer were placed on four subsequent spacecraft to complete the mission objectives: Mars Global Surveyor launched in 1996, Mars Climate Orbiter launched in 1998, 2001 Mars Odyssey launched in 2001, and Mars Reconnaissance Orbiter launched in 2005.

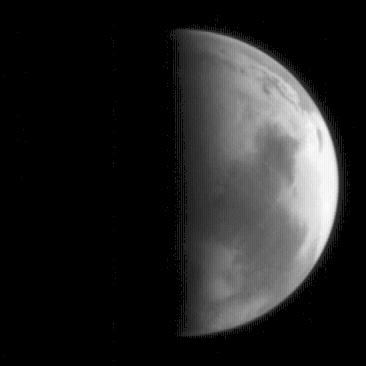
First image of Mars taken by MOC on July 27, 1993.

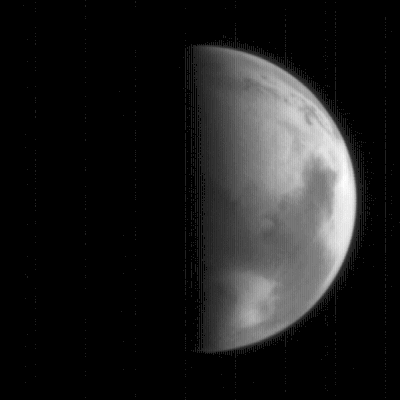
Second MOC image of Mars, acquired one hour after the first.

One of few wide-angle images by Mars Observer that were in color.

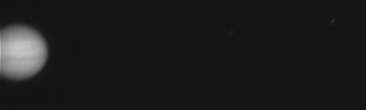
Jupiter as imaged by MOC en route to Mars.

==== Intended operations ====
JPL video outlining mission objectives

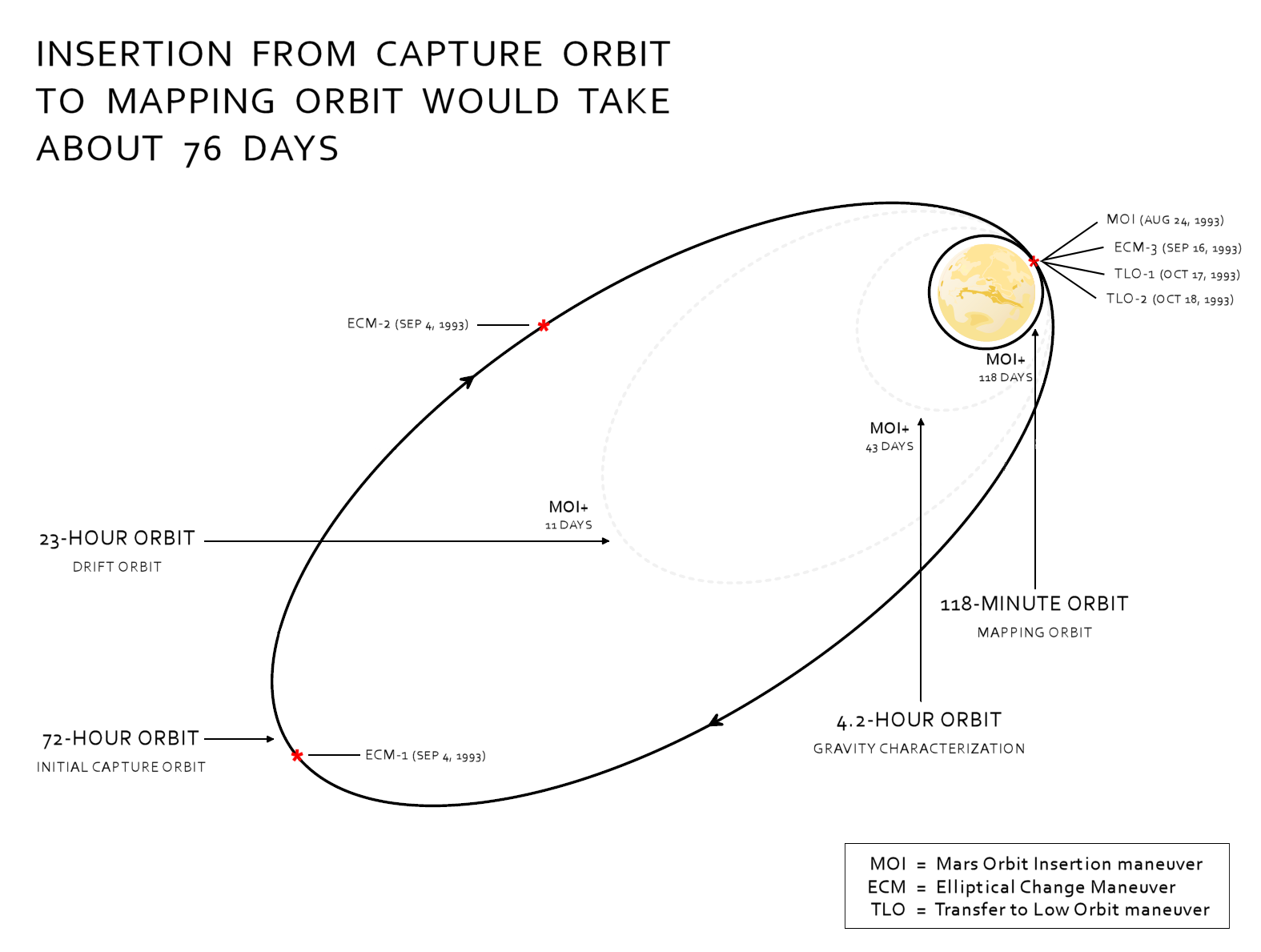
Diagram of the orbit insertion

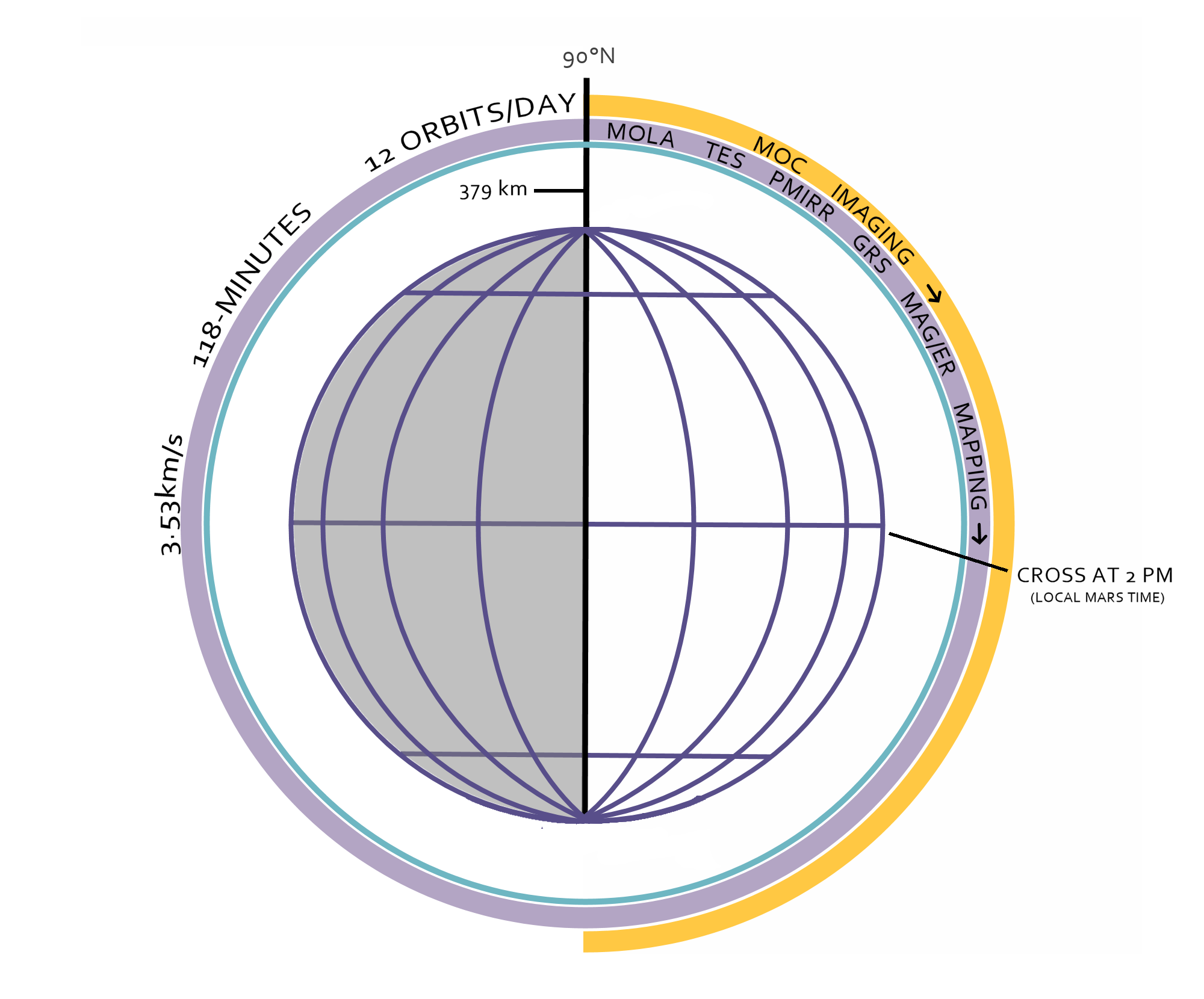
Diagram of the mapping cycle

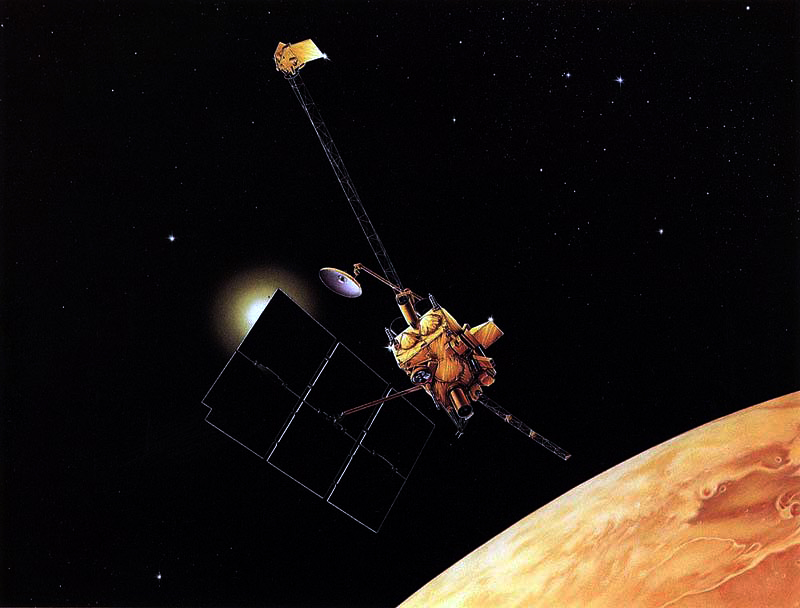
Artistic depiction

The complement of instruments on Mars Observer would have provided a large amount of information about Mars.

On August 24, 1993, Mars Observer would turn 180 degrees and ignite the bipropellant thrusters to slow the spacecraft, entering into a highly elliptical orbit. Over the next three months, subsequent "transfer to lower orbit" (TLO) maneuvers would be performed as the spacecraft reached periapsis, eventually resulting in an approximately circular, 118-minute orbit around Mars.

The primary mission was to begin on November 23, 1993, collecting data during one Martian year (approximately 687 Earth days). The first global map was expected to be completed on December 16, followed by solar conjunction beginning on December 20, and lasting for nineteen days, ending on January 3, 1994; during this time, mission operations would be suspended as radio contact would not be possible.

Orbiting Mars at an approximate speed of 3.4 km/s, the spacecraft would travel around Mars in a north-to-south polar orbit. As the spacecraft circled the planet, horizon sensors would indicate the orientation of the spacecraft while the reaction wheels would maintain the orientation of the instruments towards Mars. The chosen orbit was also Sun-synchronous, allowing the daylit side of Mars to always be captured during the mid-afternoon of each Martian sol. While some instruments could provide a real-time data link when Earth was in view of the spacecraft, data would also be recorded to the digital tape recorders and played back to Earth each day. Over 75 gigabytes of scientific data was expected to be yielded during the primary mission, much more than any previous mission to Mars. The end of the operable life for the spacecraft was expected to be limited by the supply of propellant and the condition of the batteries.

== Communications loss ==
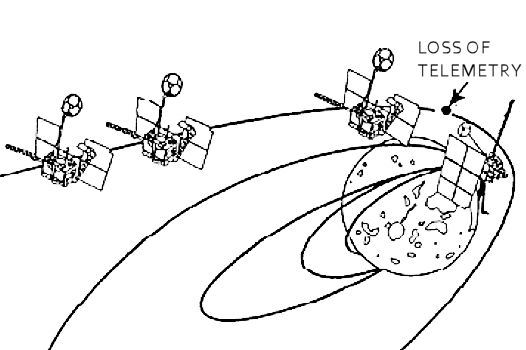
Loss of telemetry

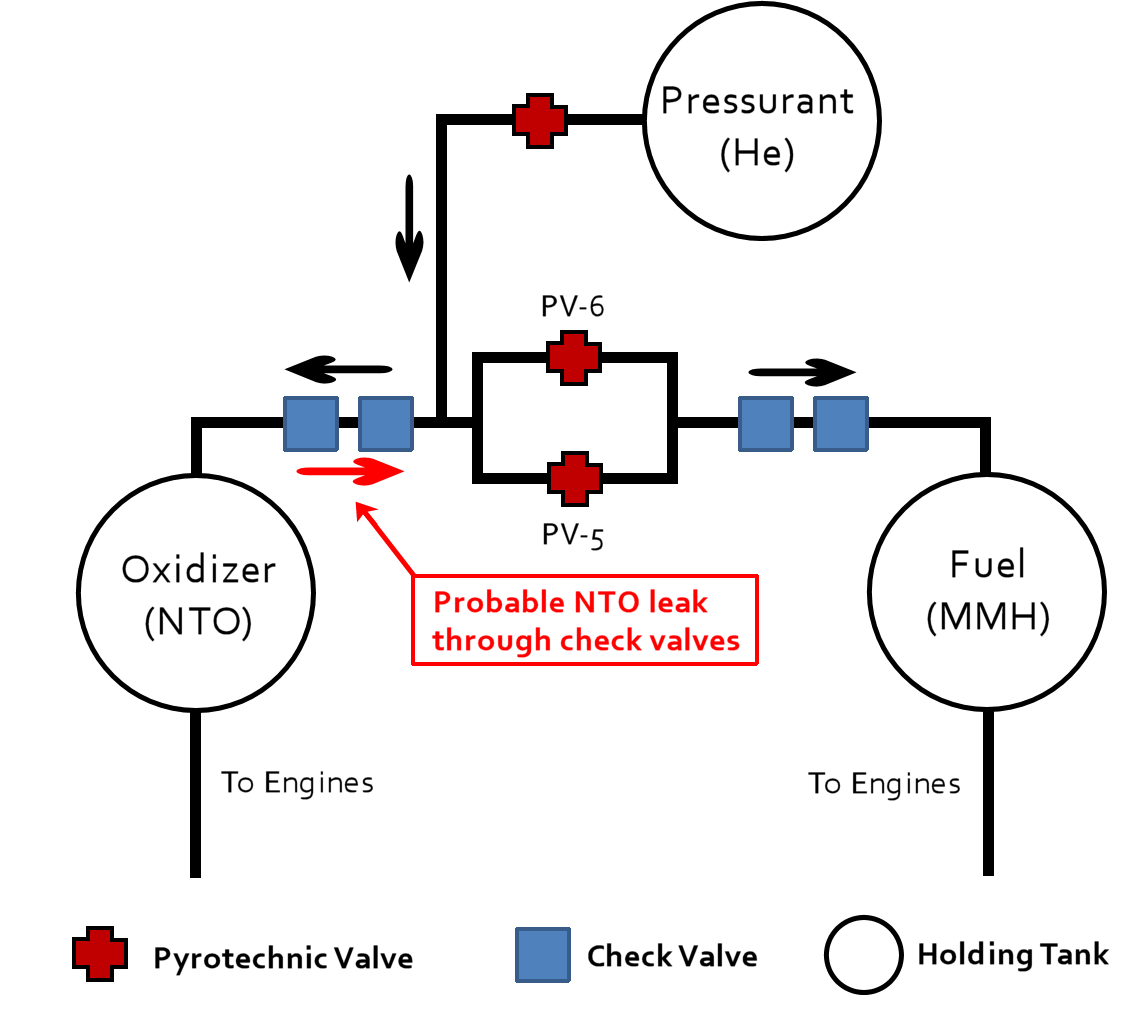
Suspected failure

Investigators believe oxidizer leaked through check valves and mixed with fuel when pyro-valves 5 and 6 were opened.

On August 21, 1993, at 01:00 UTC, three days prior to the scheduled Mars orbital insertion, there was an "inexplicable" loss of contact with Mars Observer. New commands were sent every 20 minutes in the hopes that the spacecraft had drifted off course and could regain contact. However, the attempt was unsuccessful. It is unknown whether the spacecraft was able to follow its automatic programming and go into Mars orbit or if it flew by Mars and is now in a heliocentric orbit.

On January 4, 1994, an independent investigation board from the Naval Research Laboratory announced their findings: the most probable cause in the loss of communication was a rupture of the fuel pressurization tank in the spacecraft's propulsion system. It is believed that hypergolic fuel may have leaked past valves in the system during the cruise to Mars, allowing the fuel and oxidizer to combine prematurely before reaching the combustion chamber. The leaking fuel and gas probably resulted in a high spin rate, causing the spacecraft to enter into "contingency mode"; this interrupted the stored command sequence and did not turn the transmitter on. A NASA investigation board further suggested that too much reliance may have been placed on spacecraft hardware that had been designed for fundamentally different operations than required of the Mars Observer mission.

Quoted from the report
Because the telemetry transmitted from the Observer had been commanded off and subsequent efforts to locate or communicate with the spacecraft failed, the board was unable to find conclusive evidence pointing to a particular event that caused the loss of the Observer.

However, after conducting extensive analyses, the board reported that the most probable cause of the loss of communications with the spacecraft on August 21, 1993, was a rupture of the fuel (monomethyl hydrazine (MMH)) pressurization side of the spacecraft's propulsion system, resulting in a pressurized leak of both helium gas and liquid MMH under the spacecraft's thermal blanket. The gas and liquid would most likely have leaked out from under the blanket in an unsymmetrical manner, resulting in a net spin rate. This high spin rate would cause the spacecraft to enter into the "contingency mode," which interrupted the stored command sequence and thus, did not turn the transmitter on.

Additionally, this high spin rate precluded proper orientation of the solar arrays, resulting in discharge of the batteries. However, the spin effect may be academic, because the released MMH would have likely damaged critical electrical circuits within the spacecraft.

The board's study concluded that the propulsion system failure most probably was caused by the inadvertent mixing and the reaction of nitrogen tetroxide (NTO) and MMH within titanium pressurization tubing, during the helium pressurization of the propellant tanks. This reaction caused the tubing to rupture, resulting in helium and MMH being released from the tubing, thus forcing the spacecraft into a catastrophic spin and also damaging critical electrical circuits.

== Aftermath ==
Following the failure of Mars Observer, NASA undertook several organizational reforms, implementing new policies to avoid over-reliance on heritage spacecraft systems and revising project management protocol. Furthermore, the Mars Exploration Program was established in 1993 to provide a long-term, comprehensive program for the exploration of Mars, with goals focused on identifying the location of water, and preparing for crewed missions to Mars.

== See also ==
- Exploration of Mars
- List of missions to Mars
- Planetary Observer program
- Space exploration
- Unmanned space missions
