= Commercial Titan III =

American expendable launch system

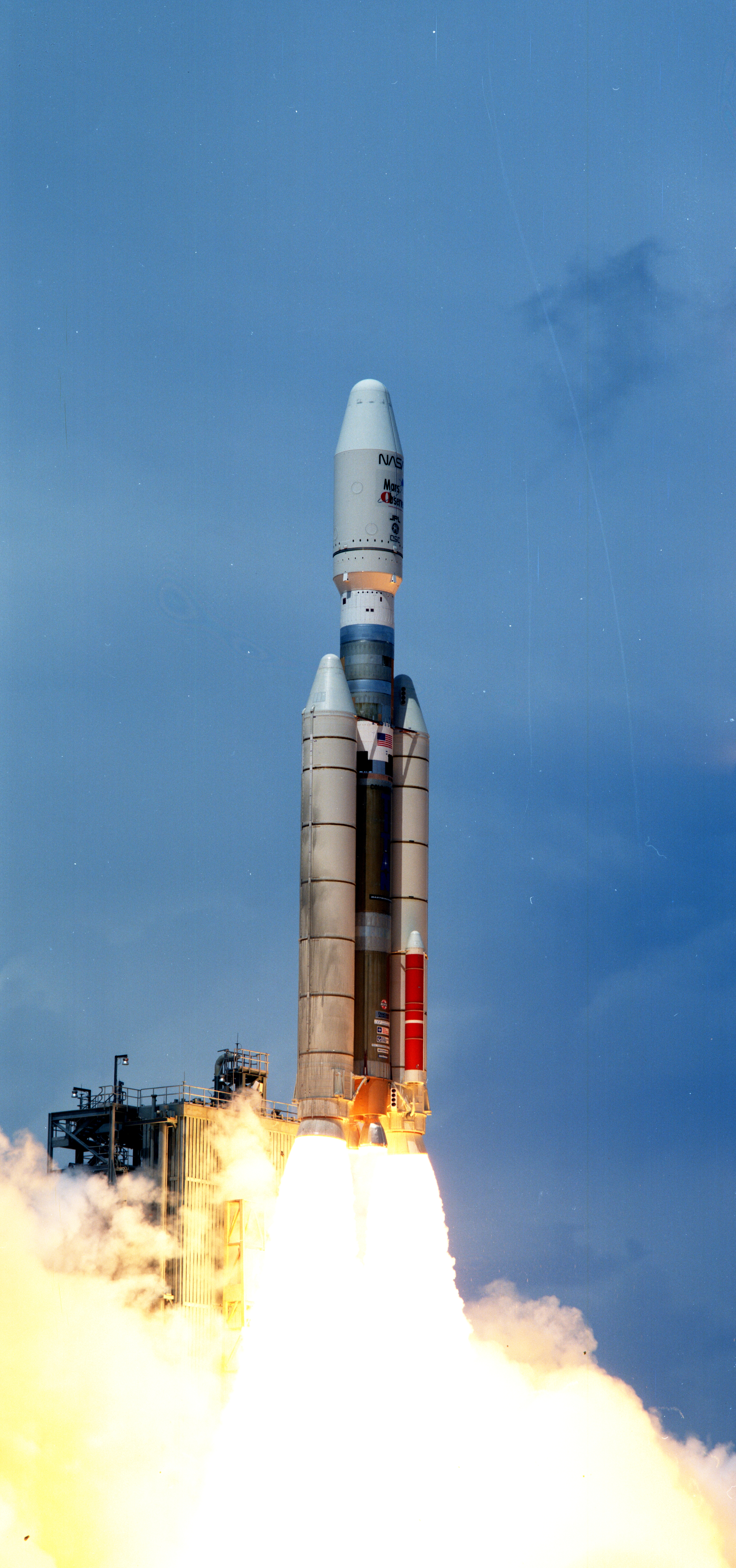
- Launch of the last CT-3 with Mars Observer
- Function: Medium carrier rocket
- Manufacturer: Martin Marietta
- Country of origin: United States

Size
- Height: 47.3 m
- Width: 9.2 m
- Mass: 680,000 kg
- Stages: UA1206 (2); Titan 3B-1; Titan 3B-2

Associated rockets
- Family: Titan

Launch history
- Status: Retired
- Launch sites: LC-40, CCAFS
- Total launches: 4
- Success(es): 3
- Partial failure: 1
- First flight: 1 January 1990
- Last flight: 25 September 1992
- Carries passengers or cargo: Mars Observer

The Commercial Titan III, also known as CT-3 or CT-III, was an American expendable launch system, developed by Martin Marietta during the late 1980s and flown four times during the early 1990s. It was derived from the Titan 34D, and was originally proposed as a medium-lift expendable launch system for the US Air Force, who selected the Delta II instead. Development was continued as a commercial launch system, and the first rocket flew in 1990. Due to higher costs than contemporary rockets such as the Ariane 4, orders were not forthcoming, and the CT-3 was retired in 1992.

The Commercial Titan III differed from the Titan 34D in that it had a stretched second stage, and a larger payload fairing to accommodate dual satellite payloads.

All four launches occurred from LC-40 at Cape Canaveral Air Force Station. The first carried two communications satellites, Skynet 4A and JCSAT-2, and was launched at 00:07 UTC on 1 January 1990, which was 19:07 local time on 31 December 1989. The launch received the International Designator 1990-001, using the UTC date.

The second launch occurred on 14 March, and carried the Intelsat 603 satellite. The rocket's second stage failed to separate, and the payload could only be released from the rocket by means of jettisoning its kick motor. It was later visited by Space Shuttle Endeavour, on mission STS-49. Astronauts attached a new kick motor, which raised the satellite into a geosynchronous transfer orbit, as had originally been planned.

The third launch, on 23 June, carried Intelsat 604, and was successful. There was no Commercial Titan III launch in 1991, due to maintenance work at Launch Complex 40.

The final flight of the Commercial Titan III occurred on 25 September 1992, and placed NASA's Mars Observer spacecraft into heliocentric orbit, by means of a Transfer Orbit Stage.

== Launch history ==
Date/Time (UTC)	S/N	Payload	Outcome	Remarks
1 January 1990; 00:07	CT-1	Skynet 4A; JCSAT-2	Success	
14 March 1990; 11:52	CT-2	Intelsat 603	Partial failure	Second stage failed to separate from kick motor, spacecraft later reboosted by Space Shuttle Endeavour on mission STS-49.
23 June 1990; 11:19	CT-3	Intelsat 604	Success	
25 September 1992; 17:05	CT-4	Mars Observer	Success	Launch was a success, used Transfer Orbit Stage for boosting to heliocentric orbit. However, probe failed prior to reaching Mars.
