= Intelsat 604 =

Geostationary communications satellite

Coordinates: 0°N 55°W

- Mission type: Communication
- Operator: Intelsat
- COSPAR ID: 1990-056A
- SATCAT no.: 20667
- Mission duration: 13 years (planned); 16 years (achieved)

Spacecraft properties
- Bus: HS-389
- Manufacturer: Hughes
- Launch mass: 4,215 kilograms (9,292 lb)

Start of mission
- Launch date: 23 June 1990, 11:19 UTC
- Rocket: CT-III/Orbus-21S CT-3
- Launch site: Cape Canaveral LC-40
- Contractor: Martin Marietta

End of mission
- Disposal: Decommissioned
- Deactivated: 6 April 2006

Orbital parameters
- Reference system: Geocentric
- Regime: Geostationary
- Perigee altitude: 35,692 kilometres (22,178 mi)
- Apogee altitude: 35,887 kilometres (22,299 mi)
- Inclination: 0.3 degrees
- Period: 1436.24 minutes
- Epoch: 26 July 1990

Intelsat 604, previously named Intelsat VI F-4, was a communications satellite operated by Intelsat. Launched in 1990, it was the third of five Intelsat VI satellites to be launched. The Intelsat VI series was constructed by Hughes Aircraft, based on the HS-389 satellite bus.

Intelsat 604 was launched at 11:19 UTC on 23 June 1990, atop a Commercial Titan III carrier rocket, flight number CT-3, with an Orbus-21S upper stage. The launch took place from Launch Complex 40 at Cape Canaveral Air Force Station, and successfully placed Intelsat 604 into a geosynchronous transfer orbit. The satellite raised itself into its final geostationary orbit using two liquid-fuelled R-4D-12 engines, with the satellite arriving in geostationary orbit on 28 June 1990.

Intelsat 604 initially operated in a geostationary orbit with a perigee of 35,692 kilometres (22,178 mi), an apogee of 35,887 kilometres (22,299 mi), and 0.3 degrees of inclination, however over time this became more inclined. The satellite carried 38 IEEE C band and ten IEEE K_{u} band transponders, and had a design life of 13 years and a mass of 4,215 kilograms (9,292 lb).

Following its arrival in geostationary orbit, Intelsat 604 was deployed at a longitude of 38 degrees west. It was moved to 27.5 degrees west in January 1991, where it operated until February 1992. From October 1992 to March 2002, it was operated at 60 degrees east. After leaving this position, it was positioned at 157 degrees east from August 2002 to September 2005. Its final deployment was from February to March 2006, at 177.85 degrees. The satellite was decommissioned on 6 April 2006 after it had been moved to a graveyard orbit.
