= STS-51 =

1993 American crewed spaceflight

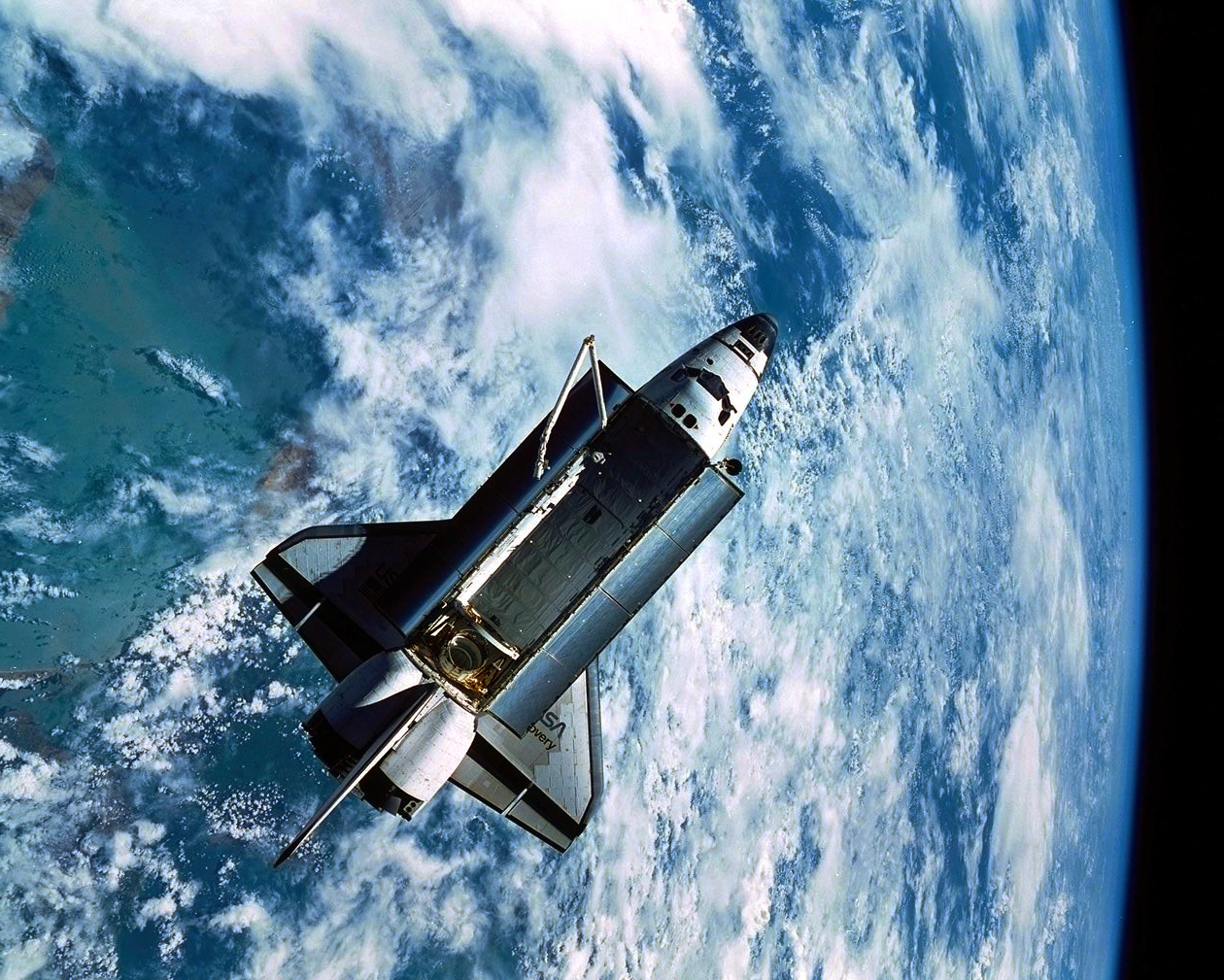
- IMAX photography of Discovery in orbit, viewed from the free-flying SPAS-ORFEUS astronomy platform
- Names: Space Transportation System-51
- Mission type: Advanced Communications Technology Satellite (ACTS) satellite deployment Astronomy
- Operator: NASA
- COSPAR ID: 1993-058A
- SATCAT no.: 22795
- Mission duration: 9 days, 20 hours, 11 minutes, 6 seconds (achieved)
- Distance travelled: 6,608,628 km (4,106,411 mi)
- Orbits completed: 157

Spacecraft properties
- Spacecraft: Space Shuttle Discovery
- Landing mass: 92,371 kg (203,643 lb)
- Payload mass: 18,947 kg (41,771 lb)

Crew
- Crew size: 5
- Members: Frank L. Culbertson Jr.; William F. Readdy; James H. Newman; Daniel W. Bursch; Carl E. Walz

Start of mission
- Launch date: September 12, 1993, 11:45:00 UTC
- Launch site: Kennedy, LC-39B
- Contractor: Rockwell International

End of mission
- Landing date: September 22, 1993, 07:56:06 UTC
- Landing site: Kennedy, SLF Runway 15

Orbital parameters
- Reference system: Geocentric orbit
- Regime: Low Earth orbit
- Perigee altitude: 300 km (190 mi)
- Apogee altitude: 308 km (191 mi)
- Inclination: 28.45°
- Period: 90.60 minutes

Instruments
- Air Force Maui Optical Site (AMOS); Airborne Support Equipment (ASE); Auroral Photography Experiment (APE-B); Chromosome and Plant Cell Division in Space (CHROMEX); Commercial Protein Crystal Growth (CPCG); High Resolution Shuttle Glow Spectroscopy (HRSGS-A); Interstellar Medium Absorption Profile Spectrograph (IMAPS); Investigation into Polymer Membrane Processing (IPMP); Limited Duration space environment Candidate materials Exposure (LDCE); Radiation Monitoring Equipment (RME-III)
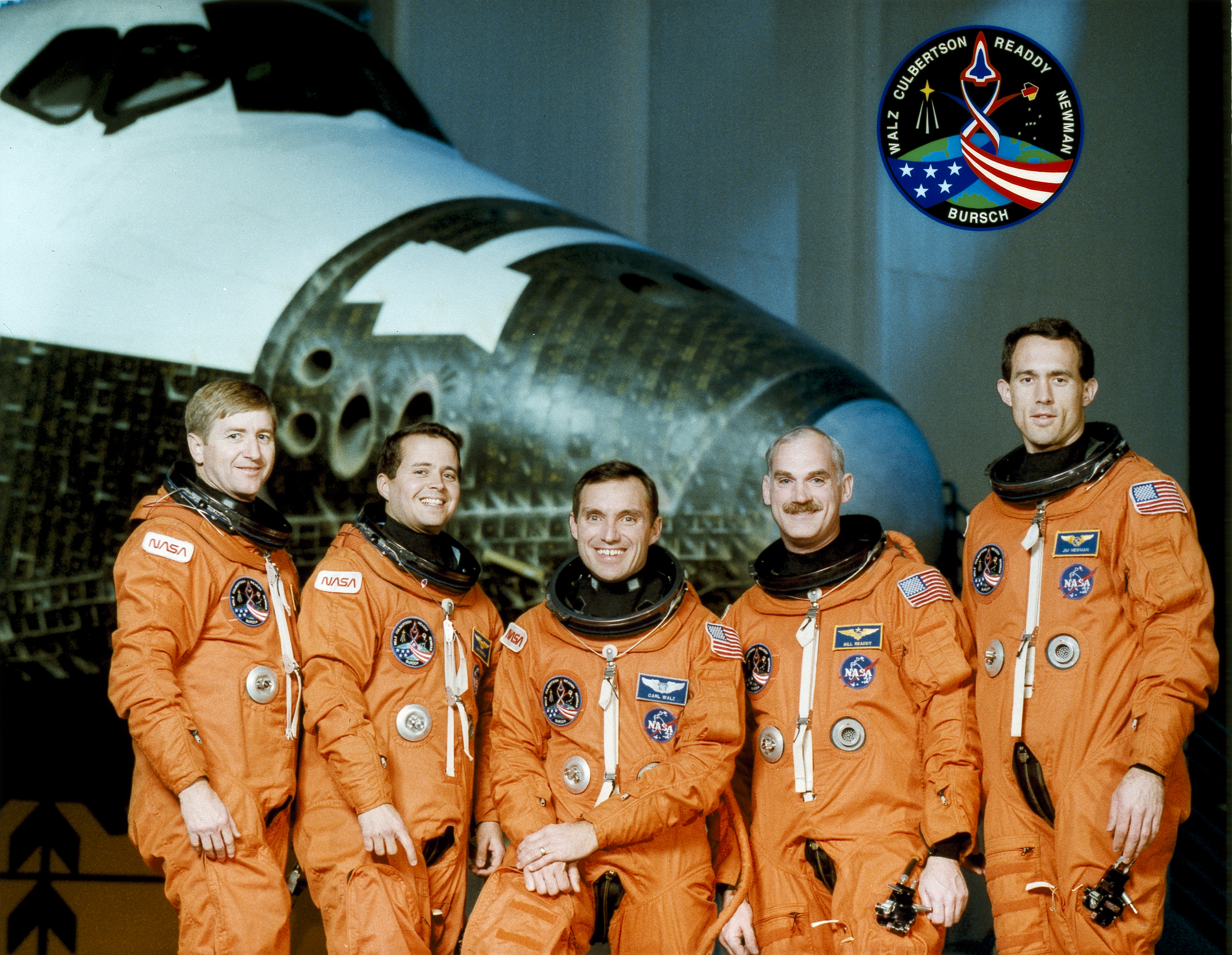
- STS-51 mission patch From left: Culbertson, Bursch, Walz, Readdy and Newman Space Shuttle program

STS-51 was a NASA Space Shuttle Discovery mission that launched the Advanced Communications Technology Satellite (ACTS) in September 1993. Discovery's 17th flight also featured the deployment and retrieval of the SPAS-ORFEUS satellite and its IMAX camera, which captured spectacular footage of Discovery in space. A spacewalk was also performed during the mission to evaluate tools and techniques for the STS-61 Hubble Space Telescope (HST) servicing mission later that year. STS-51 was the first shuttle mission to fly a Global Positioning System (GPS) receiver, a Trimble TANS Quadrex. It was mounted in an overhead window where limited field of view (FoV) and signal attenuation from the glass severely impacted receiver performance. Full triple-redundant 3-string GPS would not happen until 14 years later with STS-118 in 2007.

== Crew ==
Position	Astronaut
Commander	Frank L. Culbertson Jr. Second spaceflight
Pilot	William F. Readdy; Second spaceflight
Mission Specialist 1	James H. Newman; First spaceflight
Mission Specialist 2 Flight Engineer	Daniel W. Bursch; First spaceflight
Mission Specialist 3	Carl E. Walz; First spaceflight

=== Crew seat assignments ===
Seat	Launch	Landing	Seats 1–4 are on the flight deck. Seats 5–7 are on the mid-deck.
1	Culbertson		Seats 1–4 are on the flight deck. Seats 5–7 are on the mid-deck.
2	Readdy		Seats 1–4 are on the flight deck. Seats 5–7 are on the mid-deck.
3	Newman	Walz	Seats 1–4 are on the flight deck. Seats 5–7 are on the mid-deck.
4	Bursch		Seats 1–4 are on the flight deck. Seats 5–7 are on the mid-deck.
5	Walz	Newman	Seats 1–4 are on the flight deck. Seats 5–7 are on the mid-deck.
6	Unused		Seats 1–4 are on the flight deck. Seats 5–7 are on the mid-deck.
7	Unused		Seats 1–4 are on the flight deck. Seats 5–7 are on the mid-deck.

== Launch Preparations ==
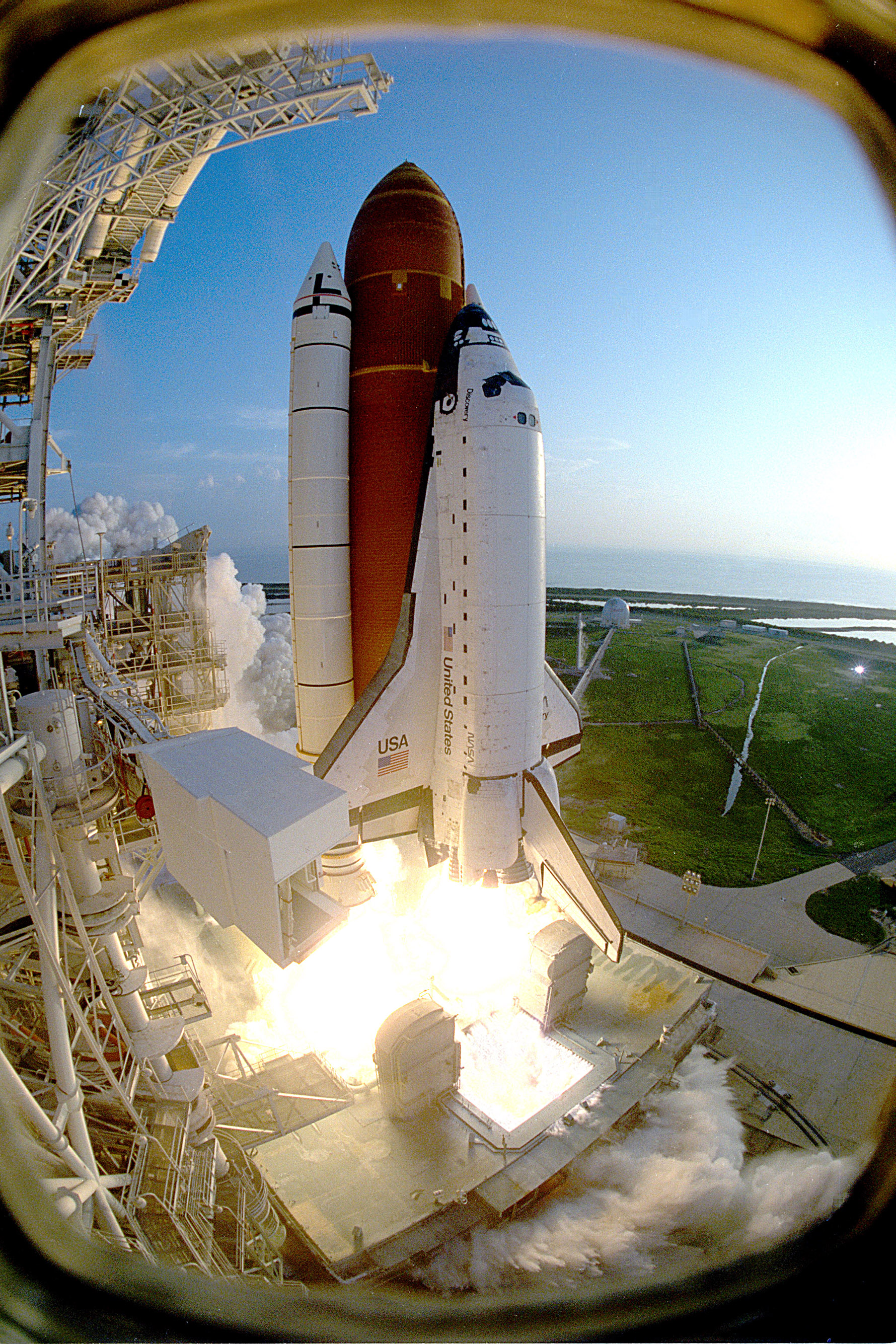
Launch as seen from the RSS.

STS-51 was notable for having been scrubbed three times on the launchpad, each time after the crew had boarded the spacecraft:

Attempt	Planned	Result	Turnaround	Reason	Decision point	Weather go (%)	Notes
1	17 Jul 1993, 9:22:00 am	Scrubbed	—	Technical	17 Jul 1993, 8:55 am (T−00:20:00 hold)		The launch was scrubbed on the pad due to a flaw in the pyrotechnic initiator controller that triggers the release of the solid rocket boosters from the mobile launcher platform.
2	24 Jul 1993, 9:27:00 am	Scrubbed	7 days 0 hours 5 minutes	Technical	24 Jul 1993, 9:26 am (T−00:00:19)		Problems with a hydraulic power unit in one of the solid rocket boosters caused another scrub on the pad. Because of the Perseids meteor shower, the next launch window did not open until the second week of August 1993.
3	12 Aug 1993, 9:12:35 am	Scrubbed	18 days 23 hours 46 minutes	Technical	12 Aug 1993, 9:12 am (T−00:00:03)		Countdown clock was held at T−5 minutes due to a communication problem. The count reached the T−3 second mark, at which point the Space Shuttle Main Engines (SSMEs) had ignited. A shutdown was then triggered by faulty fuel flow sensors in one of the SSMEs.
4	12 Sep 1993, 7:45:00 am	Success	30 days 22 hours 32 minutes				

== Advanced Communications Technology Satellite (ACTS) ==
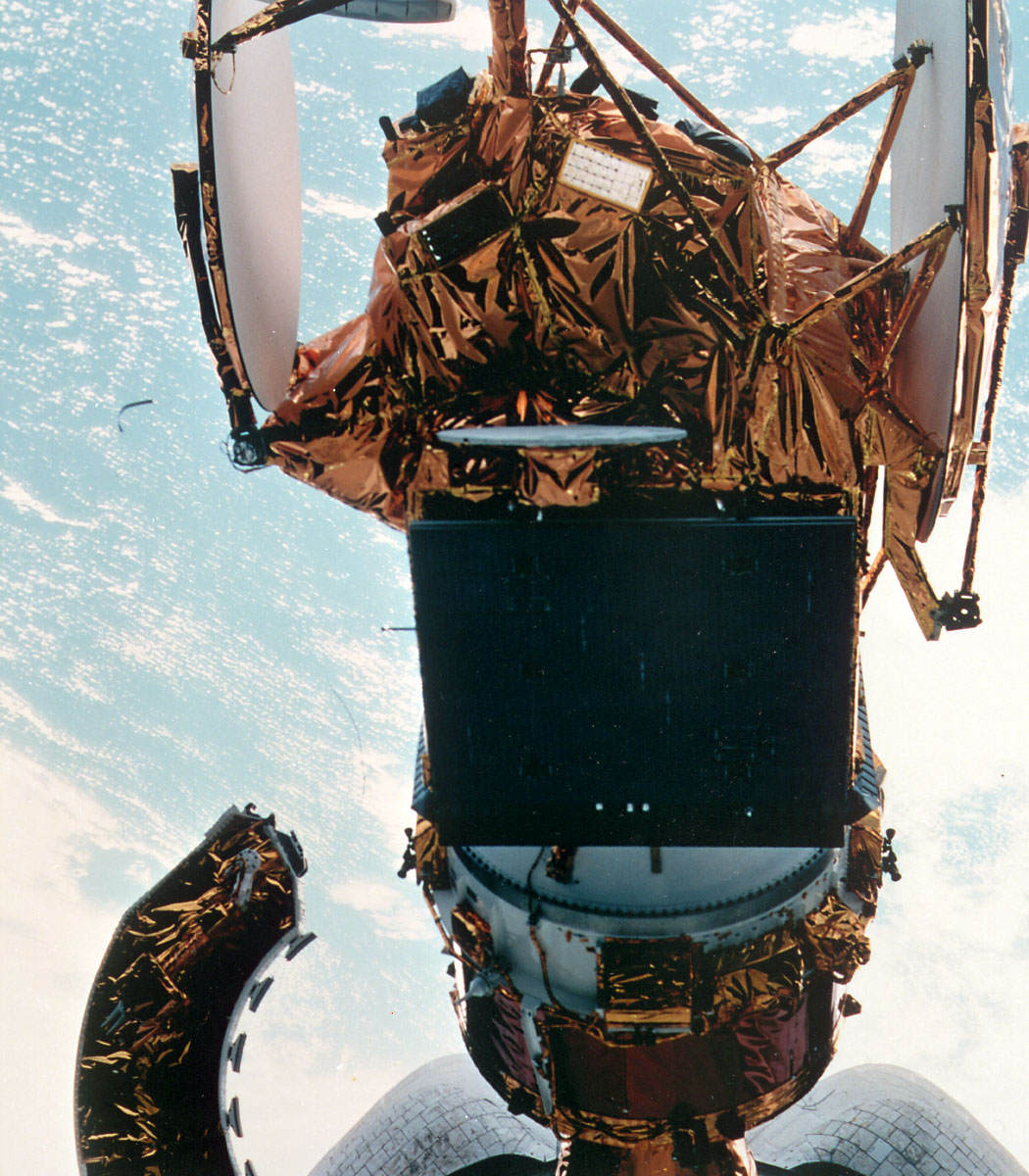
ACTS deployment

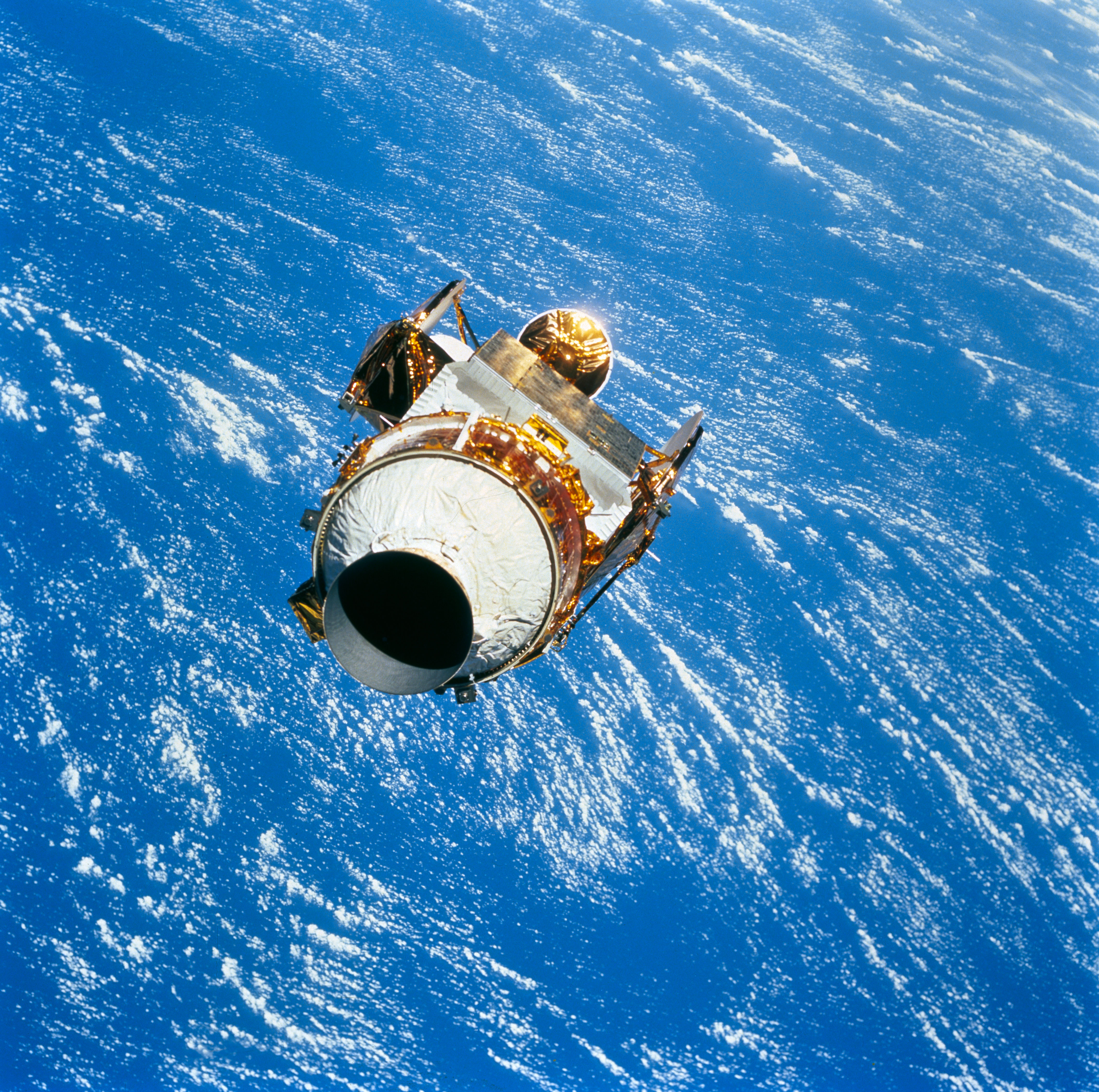
ACTS heads for geostationary orbit

The Advanced Communications Technology Satellite (ACTS) was built by Lockheed Martin Astro Space for NASA in East Windsor, NJ. The satellite was deployed on flight day 1 and served as a test bed for advanced experimental communications satellite concepts and technology. Its Transfer Orbit Stage (TOS) upper stage fired on time 45 minutes after deployment and boosted the satellite to geosynchronous orbit on the first day of the mission.

The first attempt to deploy ACTS was delayed by the crew when two-way communications were lost with Mission Control Center (MCC) about 30 minutes before the deploy time. Flight controllers could receive telemetry and voice communications from Discovery, however the crew could not receive communications from the ground. The crew waived the 2:43 p.m. CDT deploy when they did not receive a "go" from MCC as called for in preflight plans made for just such an occurrence. After the waive off of deploy, the crew changed the shuttle's S-Band communications system to a lower frequency and restored two-way communications with the ground. The two-way communications had been lost for a total of about 45 minutes. After consulting the crew, flight controllers began immediately planning for the second, and ultimately successful deploy.

During the deployment on September 12, 1993, two Super*Zip explosive cords in the Airborne Support Equipment cradle (ASE) designed to release the spacecraft, one primary and the other a backup, simultaneously detonated. This caused minor tears in two dozen insulation blankets mounted on the bulkhead between the payload bay and the AFT near the #3 APU. The ASE ring holding the TOS was damaged as well, and ejected debris was visible as the stack moved away from the orbiter.

The Advanced Communications Technology Satellite (ACTS), a significant activity of the NASA Space Communications Program, provided for the development and flight test of high-risk advanced communications satellite technology. Using multiple spot beam antennas and advanced on-board switching and processing systems, ACTS pioneered new initiatives in communications satellite technology. NASA Glenn Research Center was responsible for the development, management, and operation of ACTS as part of a long legacy of experimental communications satellites.

After fulfilling its original mission as a key part of the ACTS Gigabit Satellite Network, the spacecraft continued operations through a partnership between the space agency and a nonprofit consortium. It was shut down April 28, 2004, after funding dried up. The satellite was put into a flat spin with its solar array edges facing the Sun, which should theoretically prevent it from ever being restarted. The spacecraft was moved to its final graveyard orbit at 105.2° west longitude – where it poses minimal risk to other satellites – after NASA concluded in 2000 that it probably lacked the fuel to move to a higher graveyard orbit. Nevertheless, ACTS should not re-enter the atmosphere for thousands of years, according to Richard Krawczyk, the ACTS operations manager at Glenn Research Center.

== SPAS-ORFEUS ==
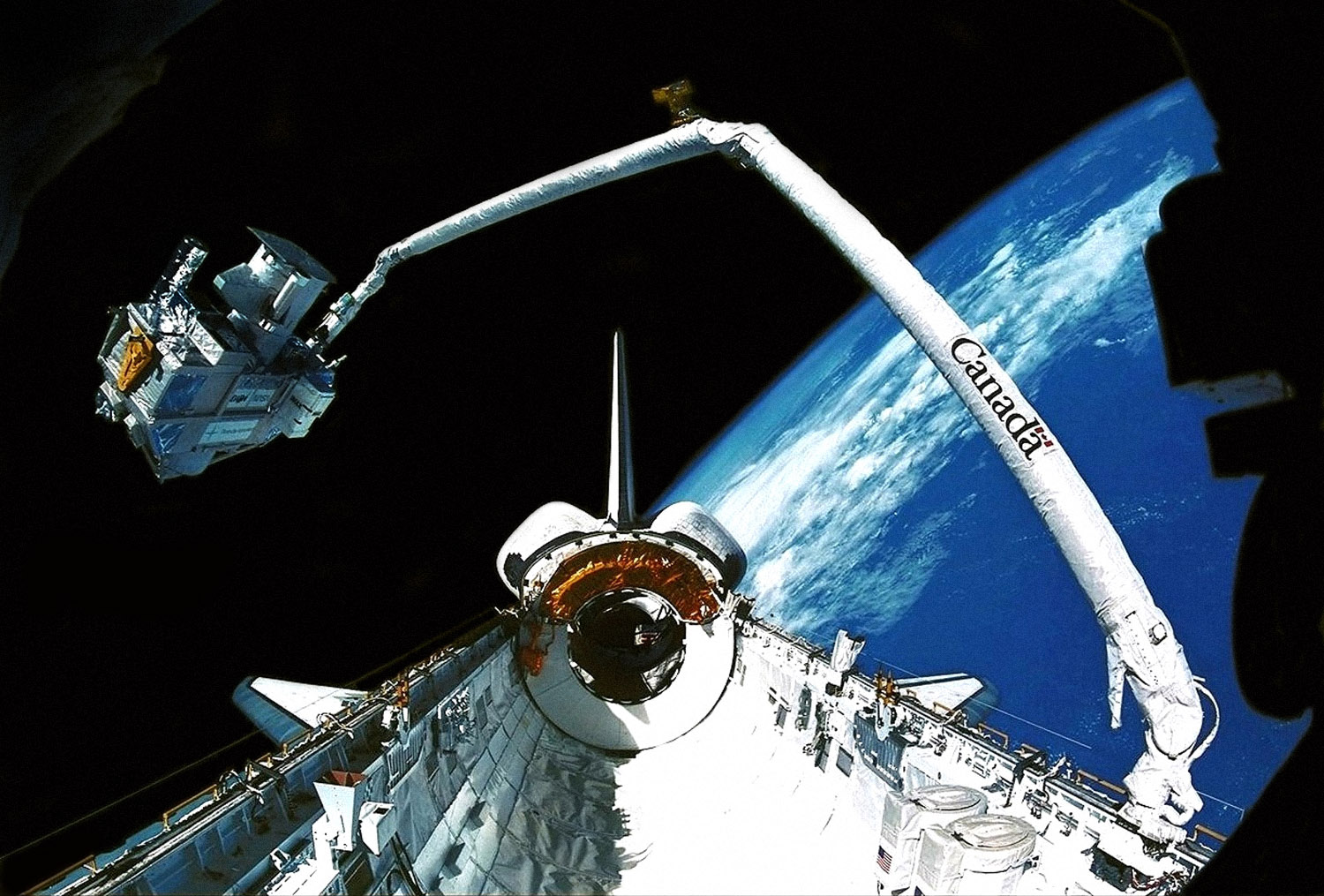
The ORFEUS/SPAS platform is captured by the Canadarm.

Another payload on this mission was the Orbiting Retrievable Far and Extreme Ultraviolet Spectrometer (ORFEUS) telescope mounted on the Shuttle Pallet Satellite (SPAS) payload carrier. ORFEUS was designed to provide information on how stars are born and how they die, while studying gaseous interstellar clouds. Also in the cargo bay was the Limited Duration space environment Candidate materials Exposure (LDCE).

Messerschmitt-Bölkow-Blohm (MBB) began development of the SPAS carrier (flown previously on STS-7, STS-41-B, and STS-39) in 1986 into a free-flying astronomical platform. The DARA/NASA agreement called for four co-operative science missions, with Deutsche Agentur für Raumfahrtangelegenheiten (DARA) providing the satellite, NASA the Shuttle launch and deployment/retrieval services, and the two parties sharing the science instruments. NASA provided the Shuttle free of charge, in return for access to data and the inclusion of U.S. experiments. ORFEUS, the Orbiting Retrievable Far and Extreme Ultraviolet Spectrometer, designed to measure radiation between 400 and 1280 angstroms, was released at 14:06 UTC, on September 13, 1993, and was retrieved at 11:50 UTC, on September 19, 1993. Science contributions came from the University of Tübingen, Sternwarte Heidelberg, University of California, Berkeley and Princeton University (IMPAS). ORFEUS' telescope was fabricated by Kayser-Threde in Germany; France's REOSC provided the 1 m (3 ft 3 in) f/2.5 mirror. The separate 950–1150 Å Interstellar Medium Absorption Profile Spectrograph (IMAPS) added to the observations of hot galactic objects and the interstellar medium at high spectral resolution (240,000). Other payloads were Deutsches Zentrum für Luft- und Raumfahrt (DLR's) Surface Effective Sample Monitor and Canada's IMAX Cargo Bay Camera, which was used to film Discovery in orbit for the IMAX film Destiny in Space. A portion of this footage was also included in Space Station 3D. This was the fourth flight of the SPAS platform, of a total of seven during the space shuttle program. The SPAS-ORFEUS version was reflown on mission STS-80 in 1996.

== Extravehicular activity (EVA) ==
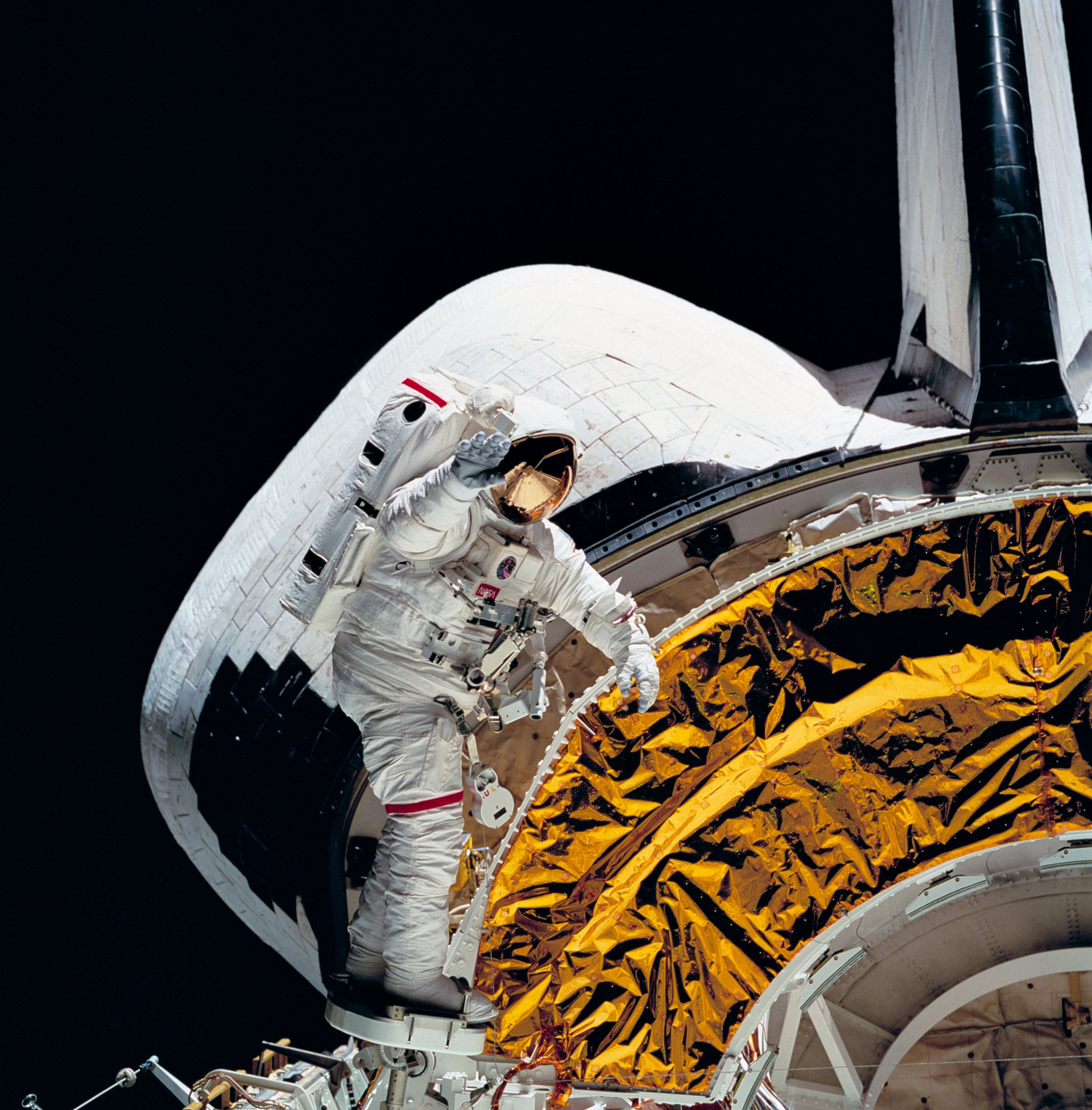
Walz during the EVA.

On September 16, 1993, spacewalkers James H. Newman and Carl E. Walz performed an extravehicular activity (EVA) designed to evaluate tools, tethers and a foot restraint platform. Their findings reassured the designers and planners of the Hubble Space Telescope (HST) servicing flight that their preparations were sound. This was the third and final shuttle mission to include a preparatory EVA in response to the weaknesses in EVA training exposed by the STS-49 mission. The new equipment tested during the extensive spacewalk would later be required for the December 1993 Hubble Space Telescope servicing mission, and was only part of the objectives of the spacewalk, with Newman and Walz fulfilling the other goals as they explained at length to Mission Control Center the differences they perceived between work in orbit and ground training. The two EVA crewmen were ahead of schedule much of the day, and completed more tasks than originally planned. As the two astronauts were cleaning up, a balky tool box lid slowed them down when they had to pry it free and close it for Discovery's trip home. The toolbox lid stretched the spacewalk by about 45 minutes over what had been planned, with Newman and Walz logging a total seven hours, five minutes, and twenty-eight seconds of time outside the vehicle. This was the 112th EVA performed in the history of human spaceflight.

=== Spacewalk ===
- Newman and Walz – EVA 1
- EVA 1 Start: September 16, 1993 – 08:40 UTC
- EVA 1 End: September 16, 1993 – 15:45 UTC
- Duration: 7 hours 5 minutes

== Secondary experiments ==
In-cabin payloads included the Air Force Maui Optical Site (AMOS), the Auroral Photography Experiment (APE-B), the Commercial Protein Crystal Growth (CPCG), Chromosome and Plant Cell Division in Space (CHROMEX), High Resolution Shuttle Glow Spectroscopy (HRSGS-A), IMAX, Investigations into Polymer Membrane Processing (IPMP) and the Radiation Monitoring Equipment (RME-III) experiment. The Investigation into Polymer Membrane Processing (IPMP), is designed to research the mixing of various solvent systems in the absence of convection found on Earth in hopes of controlling the porosity of various polymer membranes. RME measures gamma ray, electron, neutron and proton radiation levels in the crew cabin throughout the flight.

On board, Mission specialist James Newman donned a special visor to perform a medical experiment testing vision in weightlessness as part of investigations into how vision compensates for the inner ear's lack of balance in space. Newman also successfully tested a Global Positioning System receiver flying aboard Discovery as an evaluation of using such equipment to supplement the shuttle's navigation. Also, in a precursor of space station operations, one of Discovery's fuel cells was turned off and restarted.

In another medical evaluation, Commander Frank Culbertson and Mission specialist Daniel Bursch rode a stationary bike on Discovery's lower deck as part of a continuing study of using exercise to counteract the effects of weightlessness on the body. The crew also powered up an experiment that looks at improving membrane filters in weightlessness and checked on another experiment that has been running well studying the effects of microgravity on plant cells.

Astronauts Carl Walz and Jim Newman operated the experiments designed to study the glowing effect, one a spectrometer that records the effect on film in fine detail and another that records the effect on still photographs. The experiments are hoped to provide information about just what types of gases – in addition to atomic oxygen – create the glow. The information on kinds of gases in the extreme reaches of the atmosphere may be coupled with the materials exposure experiment in the cargo bay to assist with the design and construction of future spacecraft.

== Mission insignia ==
The five white stars and one yellow star of the insignia symbolize the flight's numerical designation in the Space Transportation System's mission sequence. The insignia also depicts the triangular SPAS-ORFEUS on the right.

== Documentary ==
The crew of STS-51 were followed by a camera crew from Channel 4 from the United Kingdom from the day they were assigned to the flight and then through their training and, finally, the mission itself. The documentary of this crew is called "Space Shuttle Discovery" and it was narrated by Heather Couper. It was released in 1993.

== See also ==
- List of human spaceflights
- List of Space Shuttle missions
- Outline of space science
- Space Shuttle
