= HGM-25A Titan I =

Early American intercontinental ballistic missile

Titan I
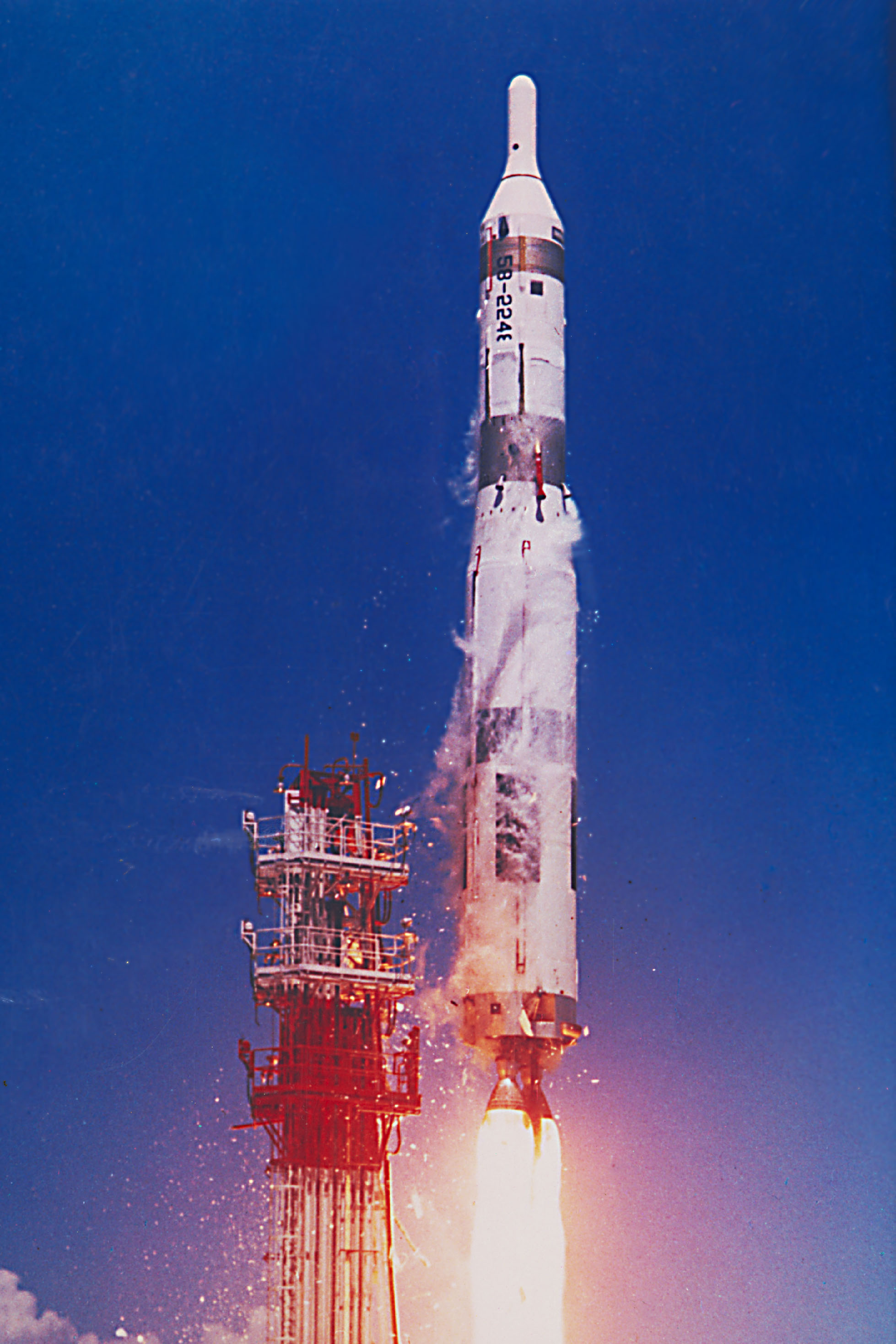
- Launch of a Titan I SM/567.8-90 ICBM from Cape Canaveral, Florida
- Function: ICBM
- Manufacturer: Martin Company
- Country of origin: United States
- Cost per launch: $1.5 million

Size
- Height: 31 m (102 ft)
- Diameter: 3.05 m (10.0 ft)
- Mass: 105,140 kg (231,790 lb)
- Stages: 2

Launch history
- Status: Retired
- Launch sites: Cape Canaveral LC-15, LC-16, LC-19, LC-20; Vandenberg AFB OSTF SLTF LC-395
- Total launches: 70 (suborbital)
- Success(es): 53 (suborbital)
- Failure: 17 (suborbital)
- First flight: 6 February 1959
- Last flight: 5 March 1965

First stage
- Engines: 1 LR87-AJ-3
- Thrust: 1,900 kN (430,000 lb_{f})
- Specific impulse: 290 seconds
- Burn time: 140 seconds
- Propellant: RP-1/LOX

Second stage
- Engines: 1 LR91-AJ-3
- Thrust: 356 kN (80,000 lb_{f})
- Specific impulse: 308 seconds
- Burn time: 155 seconds
- Propellant: RP-1/LOX

The Martin Marietta SM-68A/HGM-25A Titan I was the United States' first multistage intercontinental ballistic missile (ICBM), in use from 1959 until 1962. Though the SM-68A was operational for only three years, it spawned numerous follow-on models that were a part of the U.S. arsenal and space launch capability. The Titan I was unique among the Titan models in that it used liquid oxygen and RP-1 as propellants; all subsequent versions used storable propellants instead.

Originally designed as a backup in case the U.S. Air Force's SM-65 Atlas missile development ran into problems, the Titan was ultimately beaten into service by Atlas. Deployment went ahead anyway to more rapidly increase the number of missiles on alert and because the Titan's missile silo basing was more survivable than Atlas.

The succeeding LGM-25C Titan II served in the U.S. nuclear deterrent until 1987 and had increased capacity and range in addition to the different propellants.

== History ==
By January 1955, the size of nuclear weapons had been shrinking dramatically, allowing the possibility of building a bomb that could be carried by a missile of reasonable size. The Titan I program began on the recommendation of the Scientific Advisory Committee. The committee presented to the United States Air Force (USAF) their findings of the technical feasibility to develop weapons (bombs) and their delivery systems (intercontinental range ballistic missiles) that were completely invulnerable to "surprise" attack.

The reduction in the mass of nuclear warheads allowed full coverage of the entire Sino-Soviet land mass, and the missile control capabilities were also upgraded. The Titan I would be fully independent in controlled flight from launch to the ballistic release of the warhead, which would descend to its target by the combination of gravity and air resistance alone. In May 1955 the Air Materiel Command invited contractors to submit proposals and bids for the two stage Titan I ICBM, formally beginning the program. In September 1955, The Martin Company was declared the contractor for the Titan missile. In early October the Air Force's Western Development Division was ordered to start work. The Titan was developed in parallel with the Atlas (SM-65/HGM-16) ICBM, serving as a backup with potentially greater capabilities and an incentive for the Atlas contractor to work harder. Martin was selected as the contractor due to its proposed organization and method of igniting a liquid fueled engine at high altitude.

The Titan I was initially designated as a bomber aircraft (B-68), but was later designated SM-68 Titan and finally HGM-25A in 1962.

=== Program management ===
The previous strategic missile programs of the Air Force had been administered using the "single prime contractor concept" (later called the weapon system concept). This had resulted in three badly botched programs; the programs of the Snark, Navaho and RASCAL missiles had slipped an average of 5 years and had cost overruns of 300 per cent or more. In response, the Teapot Committee was tasked with evaluating requirements for ballistic missiles and methods of accelerating their development. As a result of the ensuing recommendations, the USAF established the Western Development Division and Brigadier General Bernard Schriever was detailed to command it. Schriever devised an entirely new organization for program management. The Air Force was to act as "prime contractor," the Ramo-Woolridge Corporation was contracted to provide systems engineering and technical direction of all ballistic missiles. The airframe contractor also would assemble the sub-systems provided by other Air Force contractors. At the time, this new organization was very controversial.

The Titan I represented an evolution of technology when compared to the Atlas missile program, but shared many of the Atlas' problems. The liquid oxygen oxidizer could not be stored for long periods of time, increasing the response time as the missile had to be raised out of its silo and loaded with oxidizer before a launch could occur. The main improvements of the Titan I over the first Atlas's deployed were vertical storage in a fully underground silo and an improved fully internal inertial guidance system. Later Atlas E/F models were equipped with what would have been the Titan I's guidance system The Titan I would be deployed with the Bell Labs radio-inertial guidance system.

=== Budgetary problems ===
The Titan, proposed as a fallback in case the Atlas failed, was by December 1956 accepted by some as a "principal ingredient of the national ballistic missile force." At the same time, others pushed for the cancellation of the Titan program almost from the beginning, arguing that it was redundant. Despite counterarguments that the Titan offered greater performance and growth potential than the Atlas as a missile and space launch vehicle, the Titan program was under constant budgetary pressure. In the summer of 1957 budget cuts led Secretary of Defense Wilson to reduce the Titan production rate from the proposed seven per month to two a month, which left the Titan as a research and development program only. However, the Sputnik crisis, which started 5 October 1957, ended any talk of canceling Titan. Priority was restored, and 1958 saw increases in funding and plans for additional Titan squadrons.

=== Flight testing ===
The Titan I flight testing consisted of the first stage only Series I, the cancelled Series II, and Series III with the complete missile.

A total of 62 flight test missiles were constructed in various numbers. The first successful launch was on 5 February 1959 with Titan I A3, and the last test flight was on 29 January 1962 with Titan I M7. Of the missiles produced, 49 launched and two exploded: six A-types (four launched), seven B-types (two launched), six C-types (five launched), ten G-types (seven launched), 22 J-types (22 launched), four V-types (four launched), and seven M-types (seven launched). Missiles were tested and launched in Florida at Cape Canaveral Air Force Station from Launch Complexes LC15, LC16, LC19, and LC20.

The four A-type missile launches with dummy second stages all occurred in 1959 and were carried out on 6 February, 25 February, 3 April, and 4 May. The guidance system and stage separation all performed well, and aerodynamic drag was lower than anticipated. Titan I was the first program to have a new missile succeed on the initial attempt, which left launch crews unprepared for the series of failures that followed. Missile B-4 exploded from a LOX pump failure during a static firing at Martin's Denver test stand in May and assorted other mishaps occurred in the following two months.

Missile B-5 was intended to launch from LC-19 as the first flight article Lot B missile, incorporating most Titan I missile systems but with a dummy warhead. A planned launch on July 31 was scrubbed due to fuel system problems. At about noon on August 5, B-5 was launched. The missile rose about ten feet before the engines shut down and it fell back onto LC-19 in a fiery explosion. Postflight investigation found that the hold-down bolts released prematurely, causing B-5 to lift before full thrust rise had been achieved. A still-attached umbilical sent a shutdown command to the engines. LC-19 was badly damaged and would not be used again for six months.

Further problems occurred over the next several months. Missiles continued to be damaged through careless personnel mistakes and General Osmond Ritland sent Martin an angry letter calling their handling of the Titan program "inexcusable." Ritland's disciplinary blast had little effect for the time being. On December 10, the first attempt was made to launch a Lot C missile, which would be a complete Titan I with all systems and a detachable warhead. Missile C-3 was prepared for launch but much like with B-5, a premature shutdown command was sent due to failure of an umbilical to detach, fortunately the missile had not been released from the pad. The umbilical was quickly repaired but any relief at having avoided near-disaster was short-lived.

At 1:11 PM EST on December 12, Missile C-3 launched from LC-16. The engines started, but the missile almost immediately disappeared in a fireball. The mishap was quickly traced to the Range Safety destruct charges on the first stage inadvertently going off. Martin technicians had moved the activator relay into a vibration-prone area during repair work on the missile and testing confirmed that the shock from the pad hold-down bolts firing was enough to set off the relay. The pad was not as badly damaged as LC-19 had been from the B-5 mishap as C-3 had not actually lifted and it was repaired in only two months.

On 2 February 1960, LC-19 returned to action as Missile B-7A marked the first successful flight of a Titan with a live upper stage—this was a composite missile as B-7's original upper stage was damaged months earlier in an accident and it was replaced with the upper stage from Missile B-6 which had had its first stage damaged in another accident. On 5 February, LC-16 returned to action by hosting Missile C-4. The second attempt at a Lot C Titan failed at T+52 seconds when the guidance compartment collapsed, causing the RVX-3 reentry vehicle to separate. The missile pitched down and the first stage LOX tank ruptured from aerodynamic loads, blowing the stage to pieces. After the first stage destroyed itself, the second stage separated and began engine ignition, sensing that normal staging had taken place. With no attitude control, it began tumbling end-over-end and quickly lost thrust. The stage plummeted into the Atlantic Ocean some 30–40 miles downrange After the successful flight of Missile G-4 on 24 February, Missile C-1's second stage failed to ignite on 8 March due to a stuck valve preventing the gas generator from starting. The last Lot C missile was C-6 which flew successfully on April 28. The Lot G missiles incorporated several design improvements to correct problems encountered on previous Titan launches. On 1 July, the newly opened LC-20 hosted its first launch when Missile J-2, an operational prototype, was flown. Unfortunately, a broken hydraulic line caused the Titan's engines to gimbal hard left almost as soon as the tower was cleared. The missile pitched over and flew onto a near-horizontal plane when Range Safety sent the destruct command at T+11 seconds. The burning remains of the Titan impacted 300 meters from the pad in an enormous fireball. The piece of plumbing responsible for the missile failure was retrieved—it had popped out of its sleeve resulting in loss of first stage hydraulic pressure. The sleeve was not tight enough to hold the hydraulic line in place, and the pressure being imparted into it at liftoff was enough to pop it loose. Examination of other Titan missiles found more defective hydraulic lines, and the Missile J-2 debacle caused a wholesale review of manufacturing processes and improved parts testing.

The next launch at the end of the month (Missile J-4) suffered premature first stage shutdown and landed far short of its planned impact point. Cause of the failure was a LOX valve closing prematurely, which resulted in the rupture of a propellant duct and thrust termination. Missile J-6 on 24 October set a record by flying 6100 miles. The J series resulted in minor changes to alleviate the second stage shutting down prematurely or failing to ignite.

The string of failures during 1959–60 led to complaints from the Air Force that Martin–Marietta weren't taking the Titan project seriously (since it was just a backup to the primary Atlas ICBM program) and displayed an indifferent, careless attitude that resulted in easily avoidable failure modes such as Missile C-3's range safety command destruct system relays being placed in a vibration-prone area.

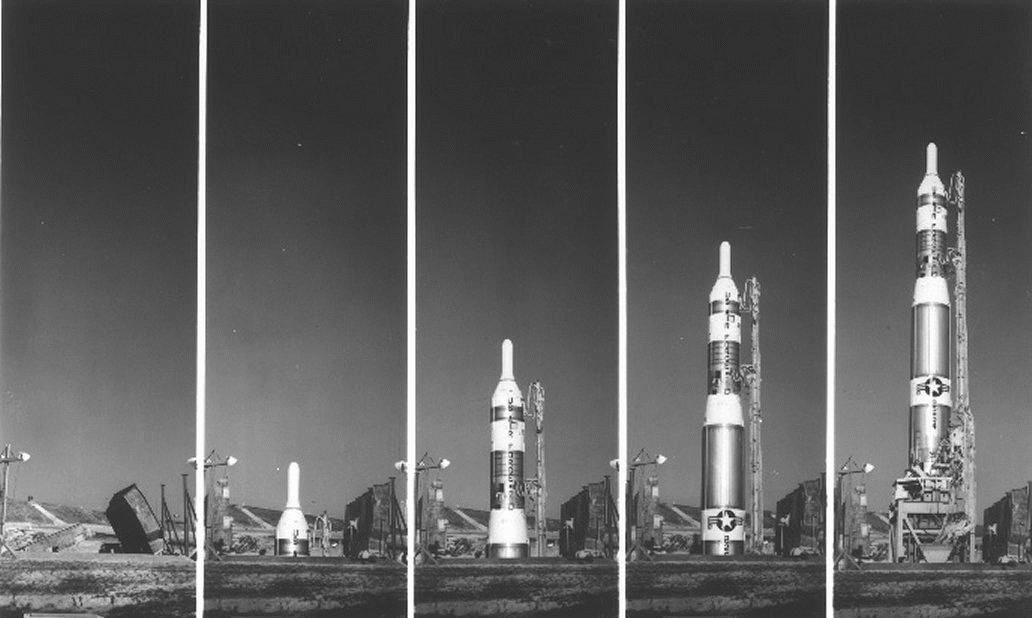
Titan I missile emerges from its silo at Vandenberg Operational System Test Facility in 1960.

In December, Missile V-2 was undergoing a flight readiness test in a silo at Vandenberg Air Force Base, California. The plan was to load the missile with propellant, raise it up to firing position, and then lower it back into the silo. Unfortunately, the silo elevator collapsed, causing the Titan to fall back down and explode. The blast was so violent that it ejected a service tower from inside the silo and launched it some distance into the air before coming back down.

A total of 21 Titan I launches took place during 1961, with five failures. On 20 January 1961, Missile AJ-10 launched from LC-19 at CCAS. The flight ended in failure when an improper disconnect of a pad umbilical caused an electrical short in the second stage. The Titan performed well through the first stage burn, but after second stage separation, the fuel valve to the gas generator failed to open, preventing engine start. Missiles AJ-12 and AJ-15 in March were lost due to turbopump problems. Missile M-1's second stage lost thrust when the hydraulic pump failed. Missile SM-2 experienced early first stage shutdown; although the second stage burn was successful, it had to run to propellant depletion instead of a timed cutoff. The added stress of this operation apparently resulted in a failure of either the gas generator or turbopump, as the vernier solo phase ended prematurely. Missile M-6's second stage failed to start when an electrical relay malfunctioned and reset the ignition timer.

With attention shifting to the Titan II, there were only six Titan I flights during 1962, with one failure, when Missile SM-4 (21 January) experienced an electrical short in the second stage hydraulic actuator, which gimbaled hard left at T+98 seconds. Staging was performed successfully, but the second stage engine failed to start.

Twelve more Titan Is were flown in 1963–65, with the finale being Missile SM-33, flown on 5 March 1965. The only total failure in this last stretch of flights was when Missile V-4 (1 May 1963) suffered a stuck gas generator valve and loss of engine thrust at liftoff. The Titan fell over and exploded on impact with the ground.

Although most of the Titan I's teething problems were worked out by 1961, the missile was already eclipsed not only by the Atlas, but by its own design successor, the Titan II, a bigger, more powerful ICBM with storable hypergolic propellants. The launch pads at Cape Canaveral were quickly converted for the new vehicle. Vandenberg Launch Complex 395 continued to provide for operational test launches. The last Titan I launch was from LC 395A silo A-2 in March 1965. After a brief period as an operational ICBM, it was retired from service in 1965 when Defense Secretary Robert McNamara made the decision to phase out all first generation cryogenically fueled missiles in favor of newer hypergolic and solid-fueled models. While decommissioned Atlas (and later Titan II) missiles were recycled and utilized for space launches, the Titan I inventory was stored and eventually scrapped.

== Characteristics ==
"The Time of the Titan" - official USAF missile development promotional film.

Produced by the Glenn L. Martin Company (which became "The Martin Company" in 1957), Titan I was a two-stage, liquid-fueled ballistic missile with an effective range of 6,101 nautical miles (11,300 km). The first stage delivered 300,000 pounds (1,330 kN) of thrust, the second stage 80,000 pounds (356 kN). The fact that Titan I, like Atlas, burned Rocket Propellant 1 (RP-1) and liquid oxygen (LOX) meant that the oxidizer had to be loaded onto the missile just before launch from an underground storage tank, and the missile raised above ground on the enormous elevator system, exposing the missile for some time before launch. The complexity of the system combined with its relatively slow reaction time – fifteen minutes to load, followed by the time required to raise and launch the first missile. Following the launch of the first missile the other two could reportedly be fired at 7 1/2-minute intervals. Titan I utilized radio-inertial command guidance. The inertial guidance system originally intended for the missile was instead eventually deployed in the Atlas E and F missiles. Less than a year later the Air Force considered deploying the Titan I with an all-inertial guidance system but that change never occurred. (The Atlas series was intended to be the first generation of American ICBMs and Titan II (as opposed to Titan I) was to be the second generation deployed). The Titan 1 was controlled by an autopilot which was informed of the missile's attitude by a rate gyro assembly consisting of 3 gyroscopes. During the first minute or two of the flight a pitch programmer put the missile on the correct path. From that point the AN/GRW-5 guidance radar tracked a transmitter on the missile. The guidance radar fed missile position data to the AN/GSK-1 (Univac Athena) missile guidance computer in the Launch Control Center. The guidance computer used the tracking data to generate instructions which were encoded and transmitted to the missile by the guidance radar. Guidance input/output between the guidance radar and guidance computer occurred 10 times a second. Guidance commands continued for the stage 1 burn, the stage 2 burn and the vernier burn ensuring the missile was on the correct trajectory and terminating the vernier burn at the desired velocity. The last thing the guidance system did was to determine if the missile was on the right trajectory and pre-arm the warhead which then separated from the second stage. In case of the failure of the guidance system at one site, the guidance system at another site could be used to guide the missiles of the site with the failure.

Titan I also was the first true multi-stage (two or more stages) design. The Atlas missile had all three of its main rocket engines ignited at launch (two were jettisoned during flight) due to concerns about igniting rocket engines at high altitude and maintaining combustion stability. Martin, in part, was selected as the contractor because it had "recognized the 'magnitude of the altitude start problem' for the second stage and had a good suggestion for solving it." Titan I's second-stage engines were reliable enough to be ignited at altitude, after separation from the first stage booster. The first stage, besides including heavy fuel tanks and engines, also had launch interface equipment and the launch pad thrust ring with it. When the first stage had finished consuming its propellant, it dropped away, thereby decreasing the mass of the vehicle. Titan I's ability to jettison this mass prior to the ignition of the second stage meant that Titan I had a much greater total range (and a greater range per pound of second-stage fuel) than Atlas, even if the total fuel load of Atlas had been greater. As North American Aviation's Rocketdyne Division was the only manufacturer of large liquid propellent rocket engines the Air Force Western Development Division decided to develop a second source for them. Aerojet-General was selected to design and manufacture the engines for the Titan. Aerojet produced the LR87-AJ-3 (booster) and LR91-AJ-3 (sustainer). George P. Sutton wrote "Aerojet's most successful set of large LPRE was that for the booster and sustainer stages of the versions of the Titan vehicle".

The warhead of the Titan I was an AVCO Mk 4 re-entry vehicle containing a W38 thermonuclear warhead with a yield of 3.75 megatons which was fuzed for either air burst or contact burst. The Mk 4 RV also deployed penetration aids in the form of mylar balloons which replicated the radar signature of the Mk 4 RV.

=== Specifications ===
- Liftoff thrust: 1,296 kN
- Total mass: 105,142 kg
- Core diameter: 3.1 m
- Total length: 31.0 m
- Development cost: $1,643,300,000 in 1960 dollars.
- Flyaway cost: $1,500,000 each, in 1962 dollars.
- Total production missiles built: 163 Titan 1s; 62 R&D Missiles – 49 launched & 101 Strategic Missiles (SMs) – 17 launched.
- Total deployed strategic missiles: 54.
- Titan base cost: $170,000,000 (US$ 1.85B in 2025)

First Stage:

- Gross mass: 76,203 kg
- Empty mass: 4,000 kg
- Thrust (vac): 1,467 kN
- Isp (vac): 290 s (2.84 kN·s/kg)
- Isp (sea level): 256 s (2.51 kN·s/kg)
- Burn time: 138 s
- Diameter: 3.1 m
- Span: 3.1 m
- Length: 16.0 m
- Propellants: liquid oxygen (LOX), kerosene
- Number of engines: two Aerojet LR87-3

Second Stage:

- Gross mass: 28,939 kg
- Empty mass: 1,725 kg
- Thrust (vac):356 kN
- Isp (vac): 308 s (3.02 kN·s/kg)
- Isp (sea level): 210 s (2.06 kN·s/kg)
- Burn time: 225 s
- Diameter: 2.3 m
- Span: 2.3 m
- Length: 9.8 m
- Propellants: liquid oxygen (LOX), kerosene
- Number of engines: one Aerojet LR91-3

=== Athena guidance computer ===
The UNIVAC Athena computer calculated ground commands to transmit to the Titan missile as part of Western Electric's missile guidance system. The Athena was the "first transistorized digital computer to be produced in numbers." It consisted of ten cabinets plus console on a 13.5 by 20 foot (4.1 by 6 m) floor plan. It used radar tracking of the missile to compute Titan flight data to the necessary burn-out point to start a ballistic trajectory toward the target. On-board Titan attitude control rolled the missile to maintain the missile antenna aligned to the ground antenna. Computer commands were transmitted to the missile from a ground transmitter a "quarter mile out" (400 m). Completed in 1957, the Athena weighed 21,000 pounds (11 short tons; 9.5 t).

The Athena computer used a Harvard architecture design with separate data and instruction memories by Seymour Cray at Sperry Rand Corporation and cost about $1,800,000.

Used with the computer were the:

- AN/GSK-1 Computer Set Console (OA-2654)
- Friden, Inc. terminal with paper tape equipment
- "massive motor-generator set with 440 volt 3 phase AC input [that] weighed over 2 tons" at remote locations
- input from one of two large AN/GRW-5 Western Electric radars in silos each with "20 foot (6 m) tall antenna" raised prior to launch and locked to the raised Titan's "missileborne antenna".

The "battleshort" mode ("melt-before-fail") prevented fail-safe circuits such as fuses from deactivating the machine e.g., during a missile launch. The last Athena-controlled launch was a Thor-Agena missile launched in 1972 from Vandenberg Air Force Base in California, the last of over 400 missile flights using the Athena.

== Service history ==
The production of operational missiles began during the final stages of the flight test program. An operational specification SM-2 missile was launched from Vandenberg AFB LC-395-A3 on 21 January 1962, with the M7 missile launched on the last development flight from Cape Canaveral's LC-19 on 29 January 1962. There were 59 XSM-68 Titan Is manufactured I in 7 developmental lots. One hundred and one SM-68 Titan I missiles were produced to equip six squadrons of nine missiles each across Western America. Fifty-four missiles were in silos in total, with one missile as a spare on standby at each squadron, bringing to 60 in service at any one time. Titan was originally planned for a 1 X 10 (one control center with 10 launchers) "soft" site. In mid-1958 it was decided that the American Bosh Arma all-inertial guidance system designed for Titan would, because production was insufficient, be assigned to Atlas and the Titan would switch to radio-inertial guidance. The decision was made to deploy Titan squadrons in a "hardened" 3 X 3 (three sites with one control center and three silos each) to reduce the number of guidance systems required. (Radio-inertial guided Atlas D squadrons were similarly sited).

Although Titan I's two stages gave it true intercontinental range and foreshadowed future multistage rockets, its propellants were dangerous and hard to handle. Cryogenic liquid oxygen oxidizer had to be pumped aboard the missile just before launch, and complex equipment was required to store and move this liquid. In its brief career, a total of six USAF squadrons were equipped with the Titan I missile. Each squadron was deployed in a 3x3 configuration, which meant each squadron controlled a total of nine missiles divided among three launch sites, with the six operational units spread across the western United States in five states: Colorado (with two squadrons, both east of Denver), Idaho, California, Washington, and South Dakota. Each missile complex had three Titan I ICBM missiles ready to launch at any given time.

Map Of HGM-25A Titan I Operational Squadrons
- 568th Strategic Missile Squadron April 1961 – March 1965

Larson AFB, Washington

- 569th Strategic Missile Squadron June 1961 – March 1965

Mountain Home AFB, Idaho

- 724th Strategic Missile Squadron April 1961 – June 1965

Lowry AFB, Colorado

- 725th Strategic Missile Squadron April 1961 – June 1965

Lowry AFB, Colorado

- 850th Strategic Missile Squadron June 1960 – March 1965

Ellsworth AFB, South Dakota

- 851st Strategic Missile Squadron February 1961 – March 1965

Beale AFB, California

=== Silos ===
Weapon System 107A-2 was a weapon system. It encompassed all of the equipment and even the bases for the Titan I strategic missile. The Titan I was first American ICBM designed to be based in underground silos, and it gave USAF managers, contractors and missile crews valuable experience building and working in vast complexes containing everything the missiles and crews needed for operation and survival. The complexes were composed of an entry portal, control center, powerhouse, terminal room, two antenna silos for the ATHENA guidance radar antennas, and three launchers each composed of: three equipment terminals, three propellant terminals, and three missile silos. All connected by an extensive network of tunnels. Both antenna terminals and all three launchers were isolated with double door blast locks the doors of which could not be open at the same time. This was to ensure that if there was an explosion in a missile launcher or the site was under attack, only the exposed antenna and/or missile silo would be damaged.

The launch crew was composed of a missile combat crew commander, missile launch officer (MLO), guidance electronics officer (GEO), ballistic missile analyst technician (BMAT), and two electrical power production technicians (EPPT). There were also a cook and two Air Police. During normal duty hours there was a site commander, site maintenance officer, site chief, job controller/expediter, tool crib operator, power house chief, three pad chiefs, three assistant pad chiefs, another cook and more air police. There could be a number of electricians, plumbers, power production technicians, air conditioning technicians, and other specialist when maintenance was being performed.

These early complexes while safe from a nearby nuclear detonation, however, had certain drawbacks. First, the missiles took about 15 minutes to fuel, and then, one at a time, had to be lifted to the surface on elevators for launching and guidance, which slowed their reaction time. Rapid launching was crucial to avoid possible destruction by incoming missiles. Even though Titan complexes were designed to withstand nearby nuclear blasts, antennas and missiles extended for launch and guidance were quite susceptible to even a relatively distant miss. The missiles sites of a squadron were placed at least 17 (usually 20 to 30) miles apart so that a single nuclear weapon could not take out two sites. The sites also had to be close enough that if a site's guidance system failed it could "handover" its missiles to another site of the squadron.

The distance between the antenna silos and the most distant missile silo was between 1,000 and 1,300 feet (400 m). These were by far the most complex, extensive and expensive missile launch facilities ever deployed by the USAF. Launching a missile required fueling it in its silo, and then raising the launcher and missile out of the silo on an elevator. Before each launch, the guidance radar, which was periodically calibrated by acquiring a special target at a precisely known range and bearing, had to acquire a radio on the missile (missile guidance set AN/DRW-18, AN/DRW-19, AN/DRW-20, AN/DRW-21, or AN/DRW-22). When the missile was launched, the guidance radar tracked the missile and supplied precise velocity range and azimuth data to the guidance computer, which then generated guidance corrections that were transmitted to the missile. Because of this, the complex could only launch and track one missile at a time, although another could be elevated while the first was being guided.

=== Retirement ===
When the storable-fueled Titan II and the solid-fueled Minuteman I were deployed in 1963, the Titan I and Atlas missiles became obsolete. They were retired from service as ICBMs in early 1965.

The final launch from Vandenberg Air Force Base (VAFB) occurred on 5 March 1965. At that time, the disposition of the 101 total production missiles was as follows:

- 17 were test launched from VAFB (September 1961 – March 1965)
- one was destroyed in Beale AFB Site 851-C1 silo explosion 24 May 1962
- 54 were deployed in silos on 20 January 1965
- 29 were in storage at SBAMA

(three at VAFB, one at each of five bases, one at Lowry, and 20 in storage at SBAMA elsewhere)

The 83 surplus missiles remained in inventory at Mira Loma AFS. It did not make economic sense to refurbish them as SM-65 Atlas missiles with similar payload capacities had already been converted to satellite launchers. About 33 were distributed to museums, parks and schools as static displays (see list below). The remaining 50 missiles were scrapped at Mira Loma AFS near San Bernardino, CA; the last was broken up in 1972, in accordance with the SALT-I Treaty of 1 February 1972.

By November 1965 the Air Force Logistics Command had determined that the cost of modifying the widely dispersed sites to support other ballistic missiles was prohibitive, and attempts were made to find new uses. By Spring 1966 a number of possible uses and users had been identified. By 6 May 1966 the Air Force wanted to retain 5 Titan sites and the General Services Administration had earmarked 1 for possible use. The USAF removed equipment it had uses for, the rest was offered to other government agencies. Eventually no sites were retained and all were salvaged. The chosen method was the Service and Salvage contract, which required the contractor to remove the equipment the government wanted before proceeding with scrapping. This accounts for the varied degree of salvage at the sites today. Most are sealed today, with one in Colorado that is easily entered but also very unsafe. One is open for tours.

The 26 ATHENA guidance computers, when declared surplus by the federal government, went to various United States universities. The one at Carnegie was used as an undergraduate project until 1971, when the former electrical engineering undergraduate students (Athena Systems Development Group) orchestrated its donation to the Smithsonian Institution. One remained in use at Vandenberg AFB until it guided a last Thor-Agena launch in May 1972. It had guided over 400 missiles.

On 6 September 1985 Strategic Defense Initiative (AKA "Star Wars" program), a scrapped Titan I Second Stage was used in a Missile Defense test. The MIRACL Near Infrared Laser, at White Sands Missile Range, NM was fired at a stationary Titan I second stage that was fixed to the ground. The second stage burst and was destroyed by the laser blast. The second stage was pressurized with nitrogen gas to 60-psi and did not contain any fuel or oxidizer. A follow-up test 6 days later was conducted on a scrapped Thor IRBM, its remnants reside at the SLC-10 Museum at Vandenberg AFB.

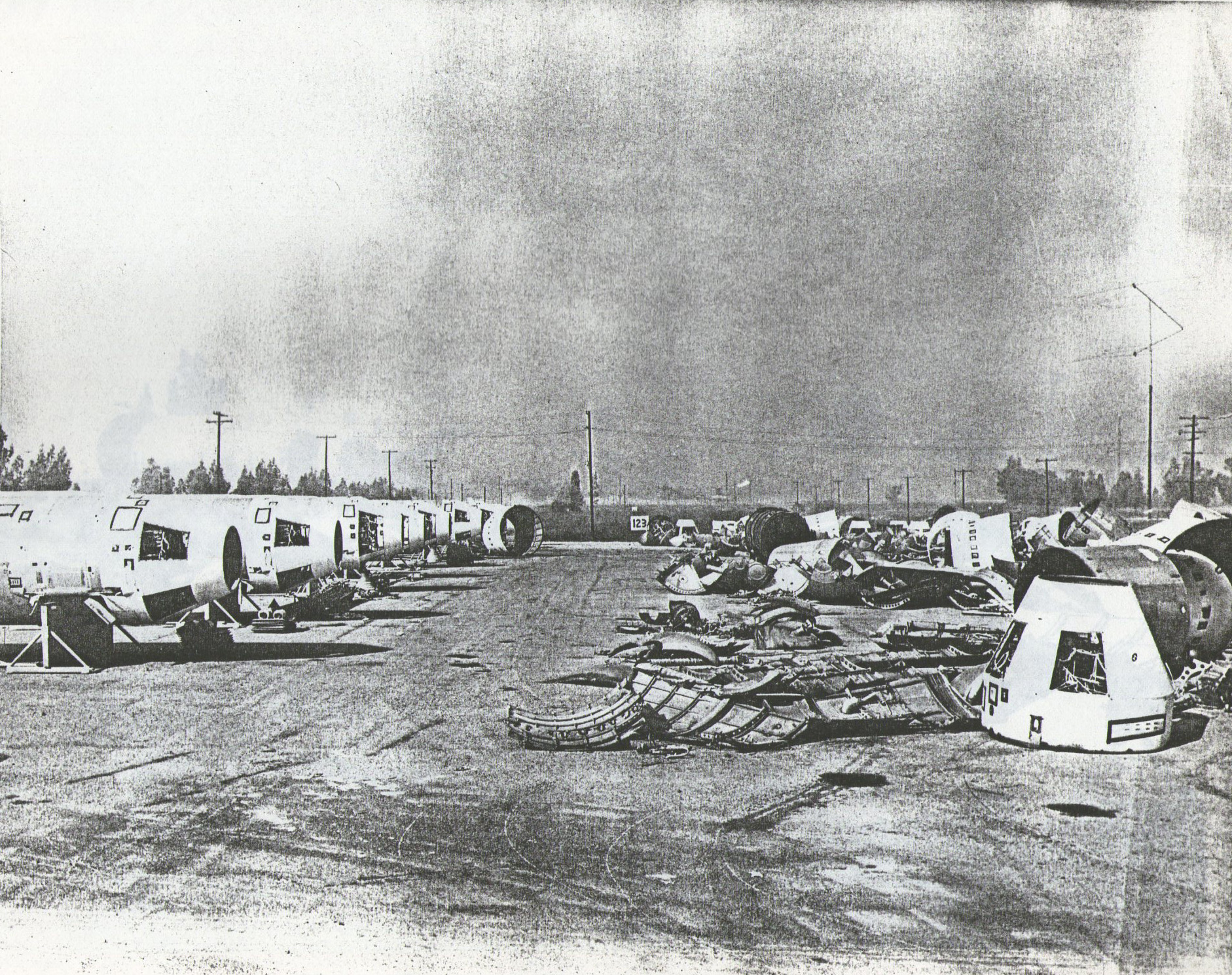
Titan-I ICBM SM vehicles being destroyed at Mira Loma AFS for the SALT-1 Treaty

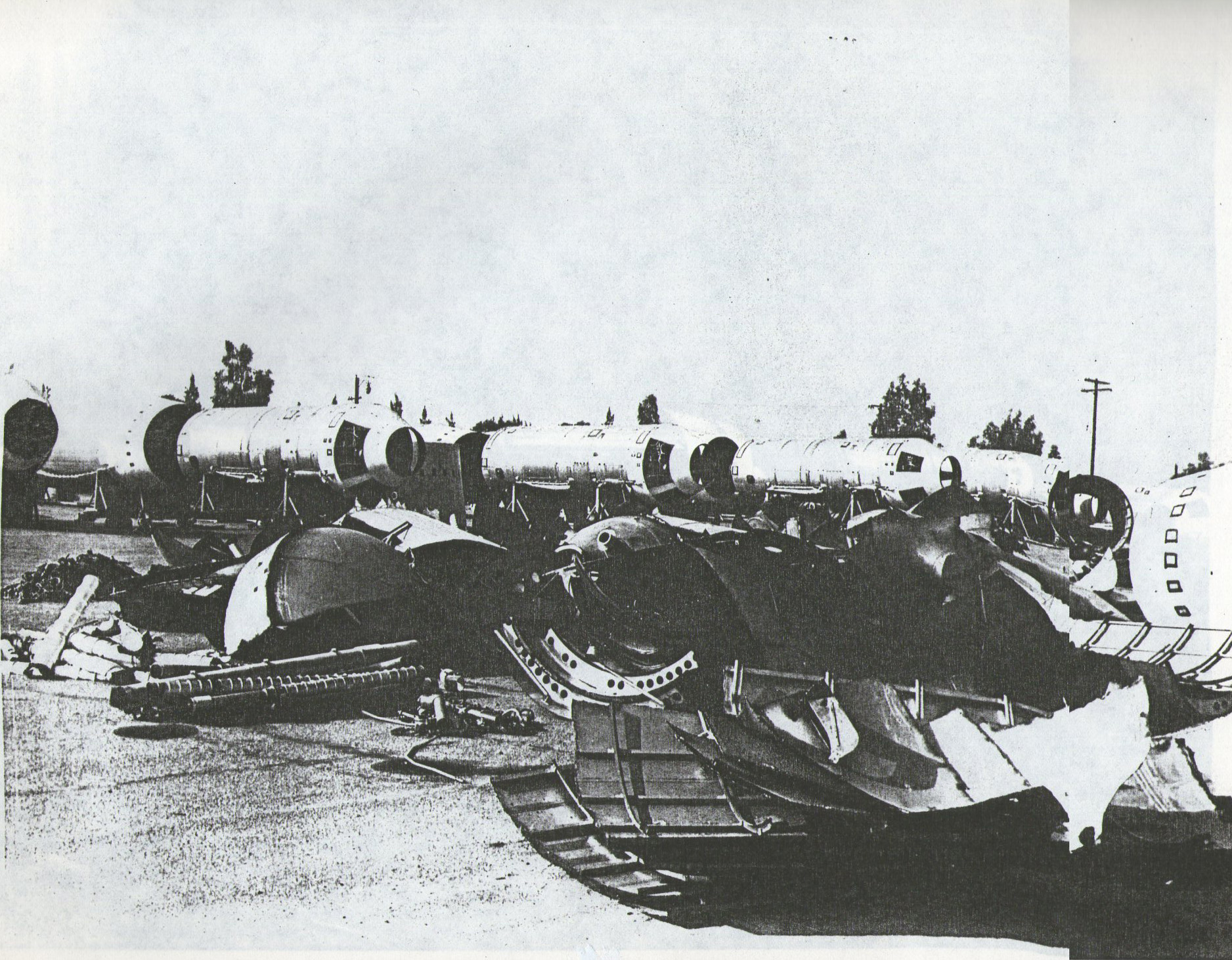
Titan-I ICBM SM vehicles being destroyed at Mira Loma AFS for the SALT-1 Treaty

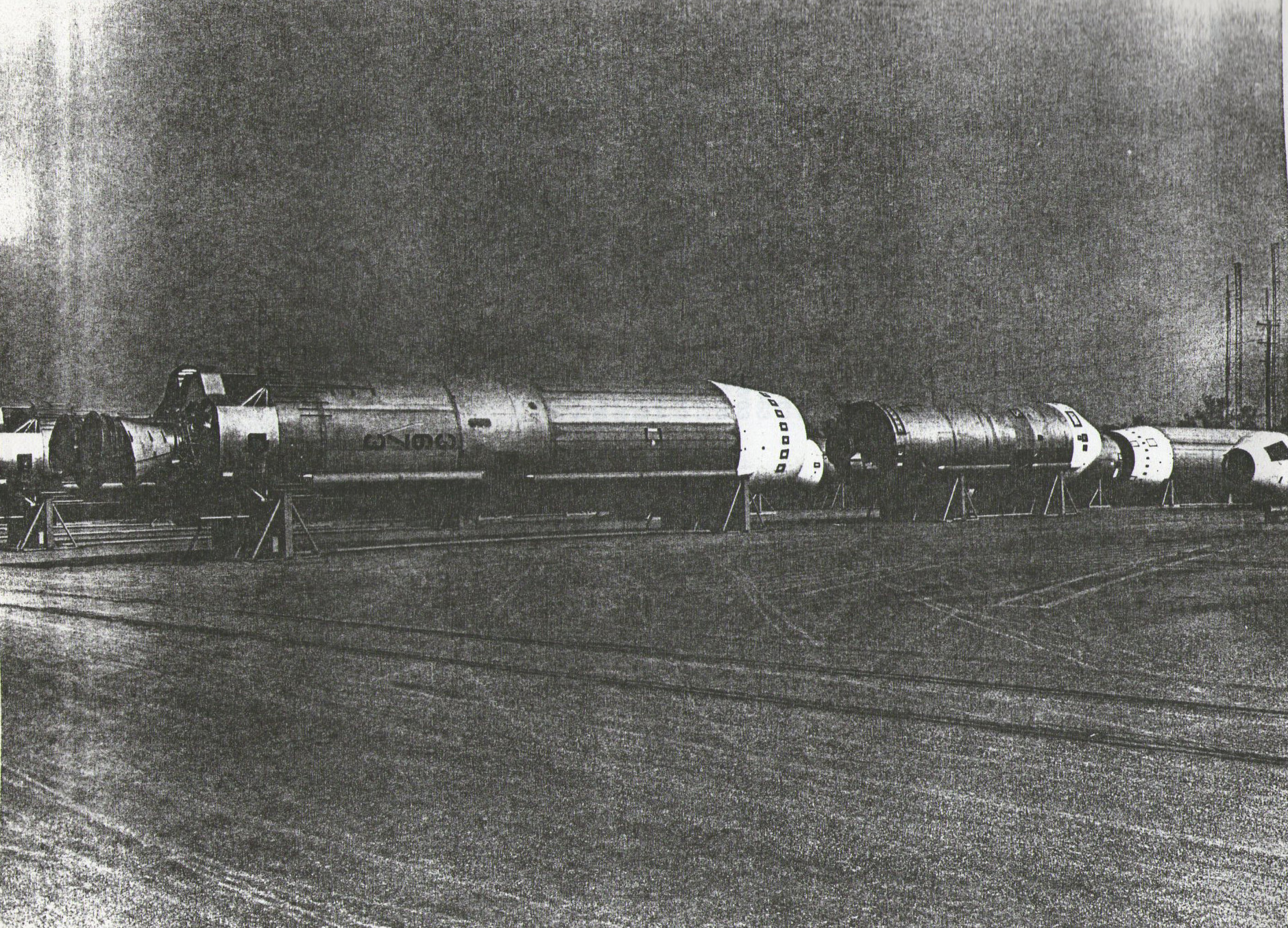
Titan-I ICBM SM vehicles being destroyed at Mira Loma AFS for the SALT-1 Treaty

== Static displays and articles ==
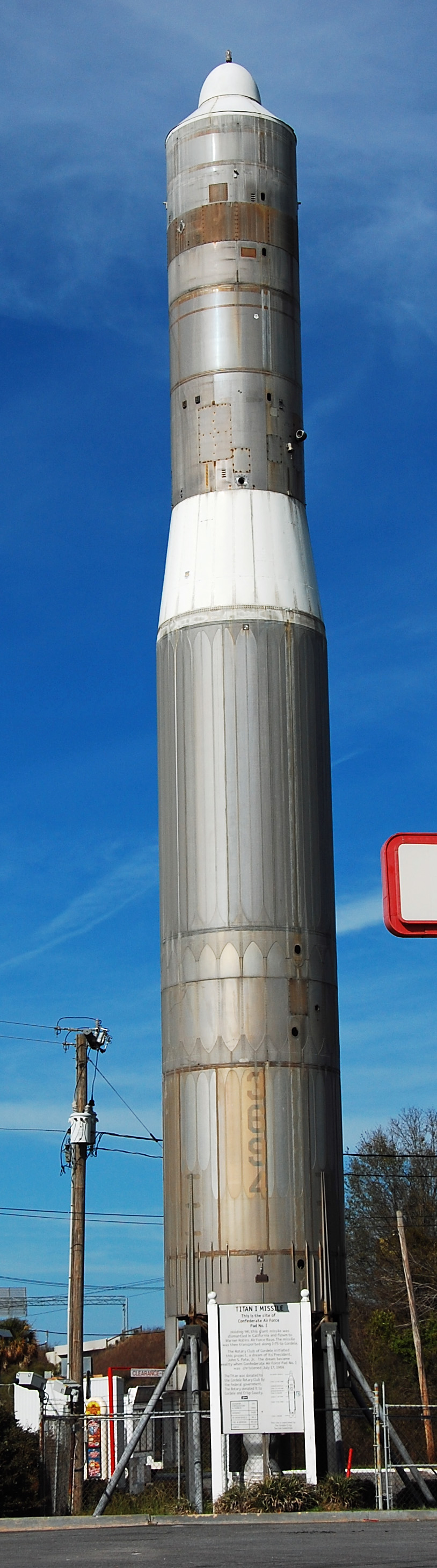
Titan I in Cordele, Georgia, I-75 exit 101

Of the 33 Titan I Strategic Missiles and two (plus five possible) Research and Development Missiles that were not launched, destroyed, or scrapped, several survive today:

- B2 57-2691 Cape Canaveral Air Force Space & Missile Museum, Florida Horizontal
- R&D (57–2743) Colorado State Capitol display 1959 (SN belongs to a Bomarc) Vertical
- R&D G-type Science and Technology Museum, Chicago 21 June 1963 Vertical
- SM-5 60-3650 Lompoc? Horizontal
- SM-49 60-3694 Cordele, Georgia (west side of I-75, exit 101 at U.S. Route 280). Vertical
- SM-53 60-3698 Site 395-C Museum, Vandenberg AFB, Lompoc, Ca. (from March AFB) Horizontal
- SM-54 60-3699 Strategic Air Command & Aerospace Museum, Ashland, Nebraska. Vertical
- SM-61 60-3706 Gotte Park, Kimball, NE (only first stage standing, damaged by winds in '96?) Vertical (damaged by winds 7/94 ?)
- SM-63 60-3708 In storage at Edwards AFB (still there?) Horizontal
- SM-65 61-4492 NASA Ames Research Center, Mountain View, California. Horizontal
- SM-67 61-4494 Titusville High School, Titusville, Florida (on Route US-1) removed, was horizontal
- SM-69 61-4496 (full missile) Discovery Park of America in Union City, Tennessee. It has been restored to correct external appearance and is now vertically displayed on the grounds. Its upper stage engine was also restored and on display.
- SM-70 61-4497 Veterans Home, Quincy, IL Vertical (removed and sent to DMAFB for destruction in May 2010)
- SM-71 61-4498 U.S. Air Force Museum, now AMARC (to go to PIMA Mus.) Horizontal
- SM-72 61-4499 Florence Regional Airport Air and Space Museum, Florence, South Carolina. Horizontal
- SM-73 61-4500 former Holiday Motor Lodge, San Bernardino (now missing?). Horizontal
- SM-79 61-4506 former Oklahoma State Fair Grounds, Oklahoma City, Oklahoma. 1960s Horizontal
- SM-81 61-4508 Kansas Cosmosphere, Hutchinson, Kansas. In storage
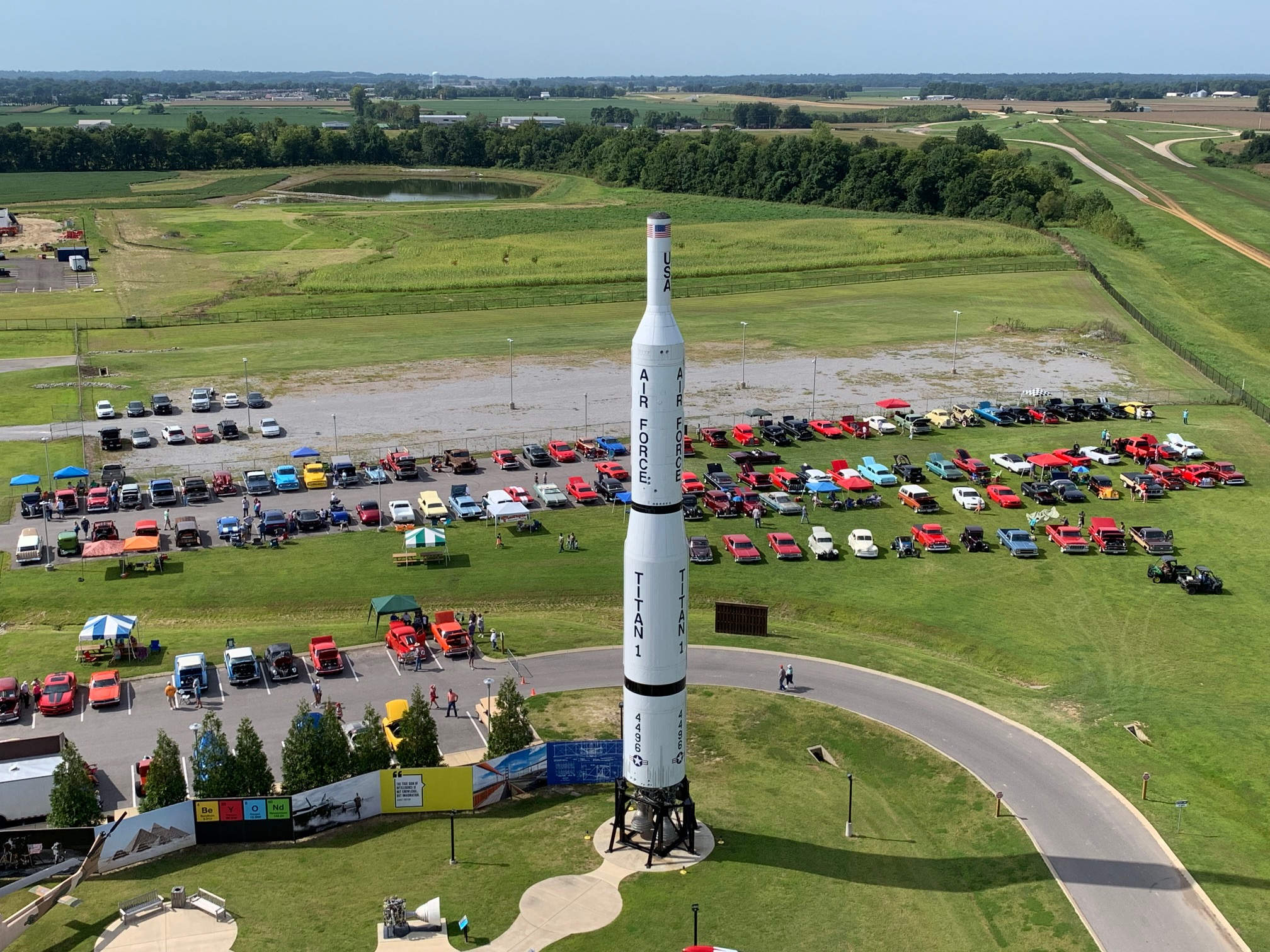
  SM-69 61-4496 at Discovery Park of America in Union City, TN.
- SM-86 61-4513 Beale AFB (not on display, was horizontal, removed 1994) Horizontal
- SM-88 61-4515 (st. 1) Pima Air & Space Museum, outside DM AFB, Tucson, Arizona, now WPAFB Horizontal
- SM-89 61-4516 (st. 2) Pima Air Museum, outside DM AFB, Tucson, Arizona, now WPAFB Horizontal
- SM-92 61-4519 (st. 1) Kansas Cosmosphere, Hutchinson, Kansas. (acq. 11/93 from MCDD) Vertical (st 1 mate to SM-94 st 1)
- SM-93 61-4520 (st. 2) SLC-10 Museum, Vandenberg AFB, Lompoc, Ca. Horizontal (only stage 2)
- SM-94 61-4521 (st. 1) Kansas Cosmosphere, Hutchinson, Kansas. (acq. 6/93 from MCDD) Vertical (st 1 mate to SM-92 st 1)
- SM-96 61-4523 South Dakota Air and Space Museum, Ellsworth AFB, Rapid City, South Dakota. Horizontal
- SM-101 61-4528 Estrella Warbirds Museum, Paso Robles, CA (2nd stage damaged) Horizontal
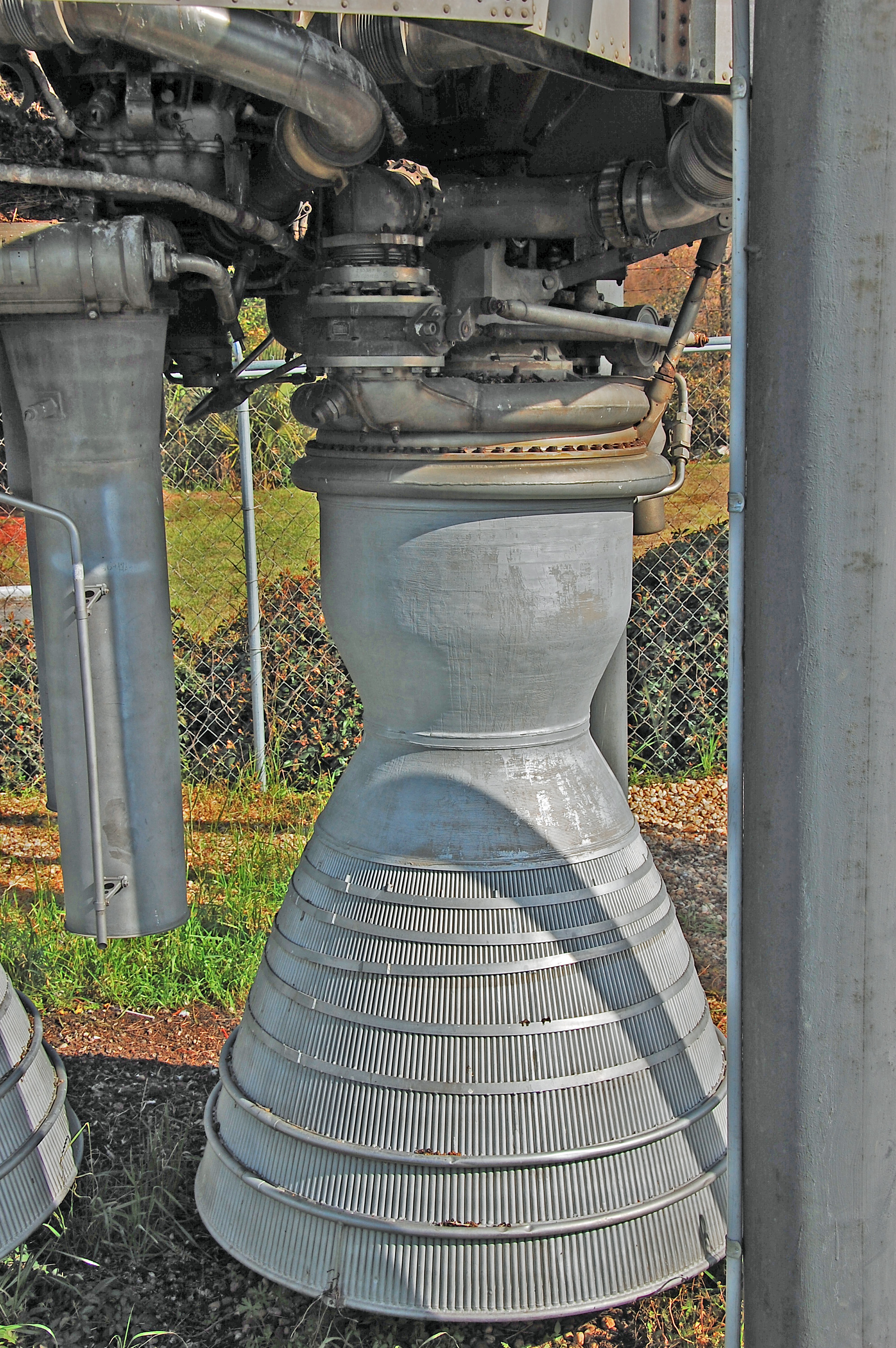
  LR87 engine
- SM-?? (stg. 2 only) former SDI laser test target (whereabouts?)
- SM-?? (stg. 1 only) former Spaceport USA Rocket Garden, Kennedy Space Center, Florida. Vert. (stg 1 mated to stg 1 below)
- SM-?? (stg. 1 only) former Spaceport USA Rocket Garden, Kennedy Space Center, Florida. Vert. (stg 1 mated to stg 1 above)
- SM-?? (stg. 1 only) Science Museum, Bayamon, Puerto Rico Vert. (stg 1 mated to stg 1 below)
- SM-?? (stg. 1 only) Science Museum, Bayamon, Puerto Rico (top half from Bell's Junkyard) Vert. (stg 1 mated to stg 1 above)
- SM-?? (full missile) former Outside main gate of White Sands Missile Range, N.M. false report? Vertical
- SM-?? (full missile) Spacetec CCAFS Horizontal

Note: Two stacked Titan-1 first stages created a perfect illusion of a Titan-2 Missile for museums above.

== Prospective manned flights ==
The Titan I was considered for use as the first missile to put a man in space. Two of the firms responding to an Air Force "Request for Proposal" for "Project 7969," an early USAF project to "Put a Man in Space Soonest (MISS)". Two of the four firms which responded, Martin and Avco, proposed using Titan I as the booster.

== See also ==
- Titan rocket family
- List of Titan launches
- List of military aircraft of the United States
- List of missiles
