= Aerojet LR87 =

American rocket engine family used on Titan missile first stages

LR87
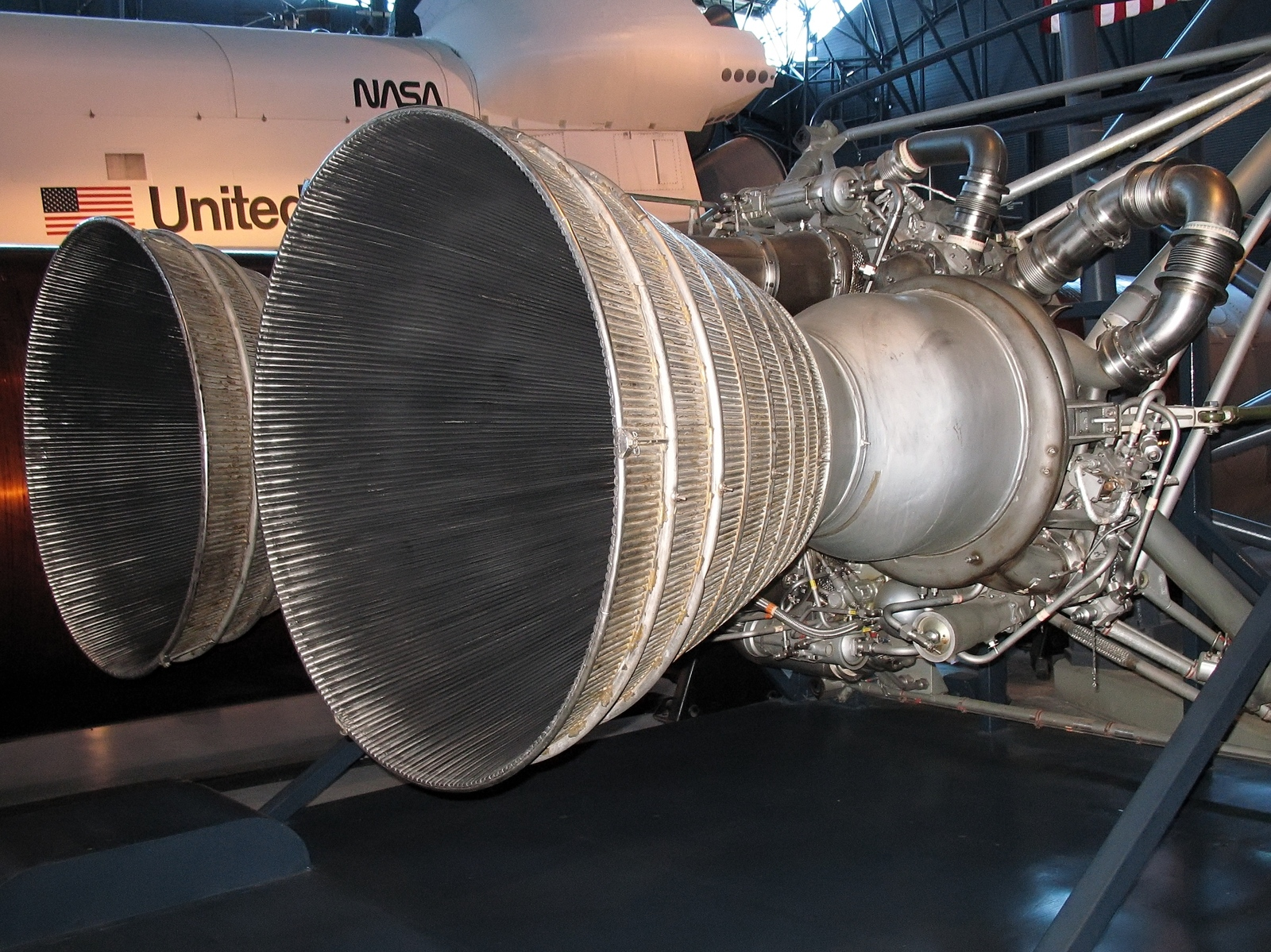
- XLR87 engine
- Country of origin: United States
- First flight: 1959
- Last flight: 2005
- Manufacturer: Aerojet
- Application: Main engine
- Associated LV: Titan
- Successor: D LR-91

Liquid-fuel engine
- Propellant: LR87-3: RP-1 / LOX; LR87-5, LR87-7, LR87-9, LR87-11: Aerozine 50 / N_{2}O_{4}; LR87 LH2: LH_{2} / LOX
- Cycle: Gas-generator

Performance
- Thrust, sea-level: LR87-11: 1,900 kN (430,000 lb_{f})
- Chamber pressure: 40–59 bar (4,000–5,900 kPa)
- Specific impulse, vacuum: 290 s (2.8 km/s)
- Specific impulse, sea-level: 256 s (2.51 km/s)

Dimensions
- Length: 3.13–3.84 m (10.3–12.6 ft); LR87 LH2: 4 m (13 ft)
- Diameter: 1.14 m (3 ft 9 in)
- Dry mass: 839 kg (1,850 lb)

The LR87 is an American liquid-propellant rocket engine that was used on the first stages of Titan intercontinental ballistic missiles and launch vehicles. Composed of twin motors with separate combustion chambers and turbopump machinery, it is considered a single unit and was never flown as a single combustion chamber engine or designed for this. The LR87 first flew in 1959.

The LR87 was developed in the late 1950s by Aerojet. It was the first production rocket engine capable (in its various models) of burning the three most-common liquid rocket propellant combinations: liquid oxygen/RP-1, nitrogen tetroxide (NTO)/Aerozine 50 (a 50:50 mixture by mass of hydrazine and UDMH), and liquid oxygen/liquid hydrogen. The engine operated on an open gas-generator cycle and utilized a regeneratively cooled combustion chamber. For each thrust chamber assembly, a single high-speed turbine drove the lower-speed centrifugal fuel and oxidizer pumps through gearing, a configuration designed for high turbopump efficiency. This lowered fuel use in the gas generator and improved specific impulse. The LR87 served as a template for the LR-91, which was used in the second stage of the Titan missile.

The LR87 was a fixed-thrust engine, which could not be throttled or restarted in flight. The LR87 delivered approximately 1,900 kilonewtons (430,000 pounds) of thrust in its hypergolic configuration. Early LR87 engines used on the Titan I burned RP-1 and liquid oxygen. Because liquid oxygen is cryogenic, it could not be stored in the missile for long periods of time, and had to be loaded before the missile could be launched. For the Titan II, the engine was converted to use Aerozine 50 and nitrogen tetroxide, which are hypergolic and storable at room temperature. This allowed Titan II missiles to be kept fully fueled and ready to launch on short notice.

For the Titan III and IV, which were larger, more capable space launch vehicles, the LR87 was modified further. Thrust and nozzle area ratio were progressively increased, requiring heavier turbopumps, pipes, and other parts.

== Variants ==
=== LR87-3 ===
Used on the Titan I, the LR87-3 burned liquid oxygen and RP-1. Following the retirement of the Titan missile program, these engines saw no further use. The LR87-3 was also operated with NTO/Aerozine 50 and ground tested with LOX/H2 (with a new fuel pump), making it one of very few engines to have been run on three different propellant combinations.

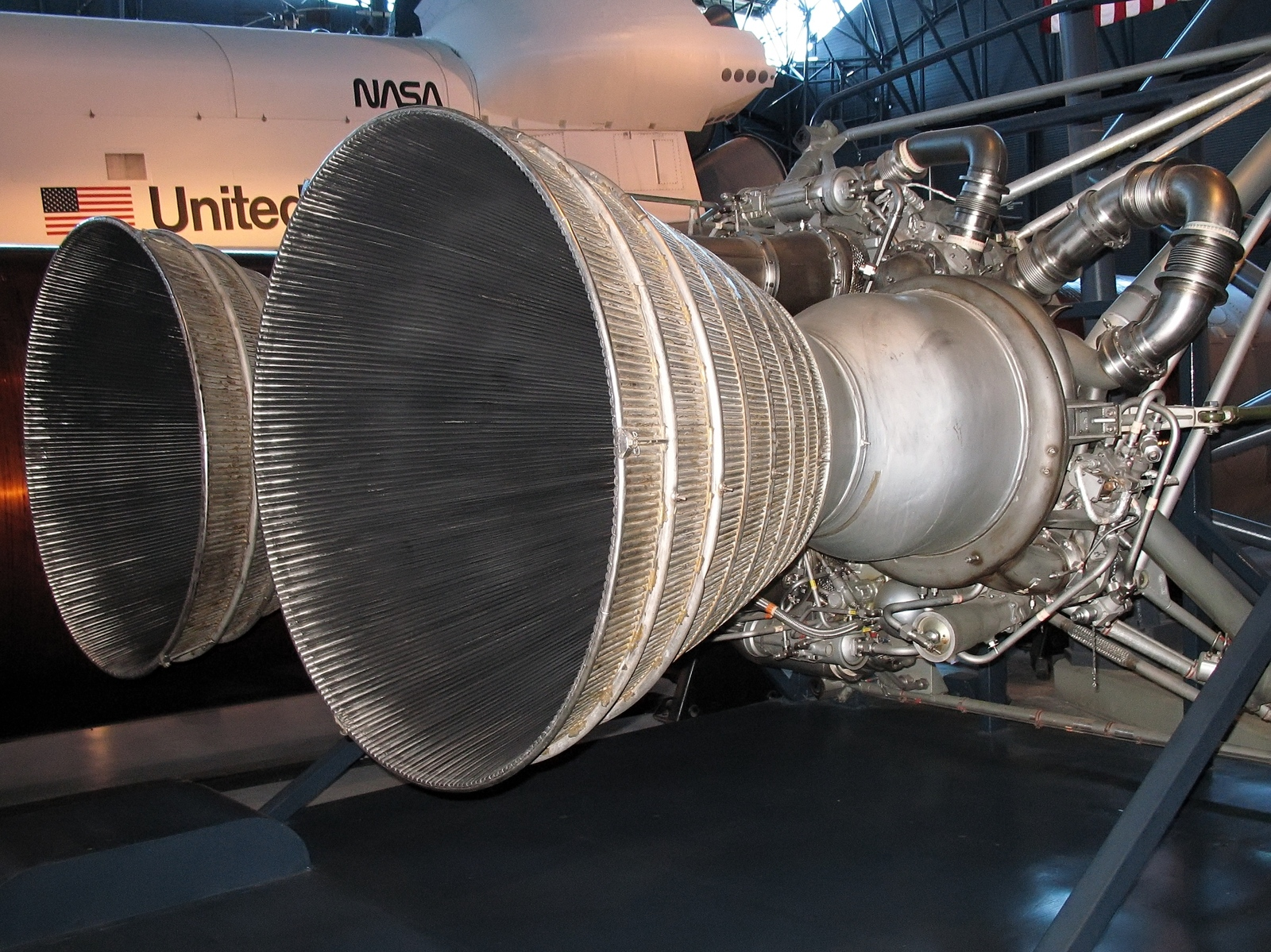
Titan I LR87-3 (Steven F. Udvar-Hazy Center)

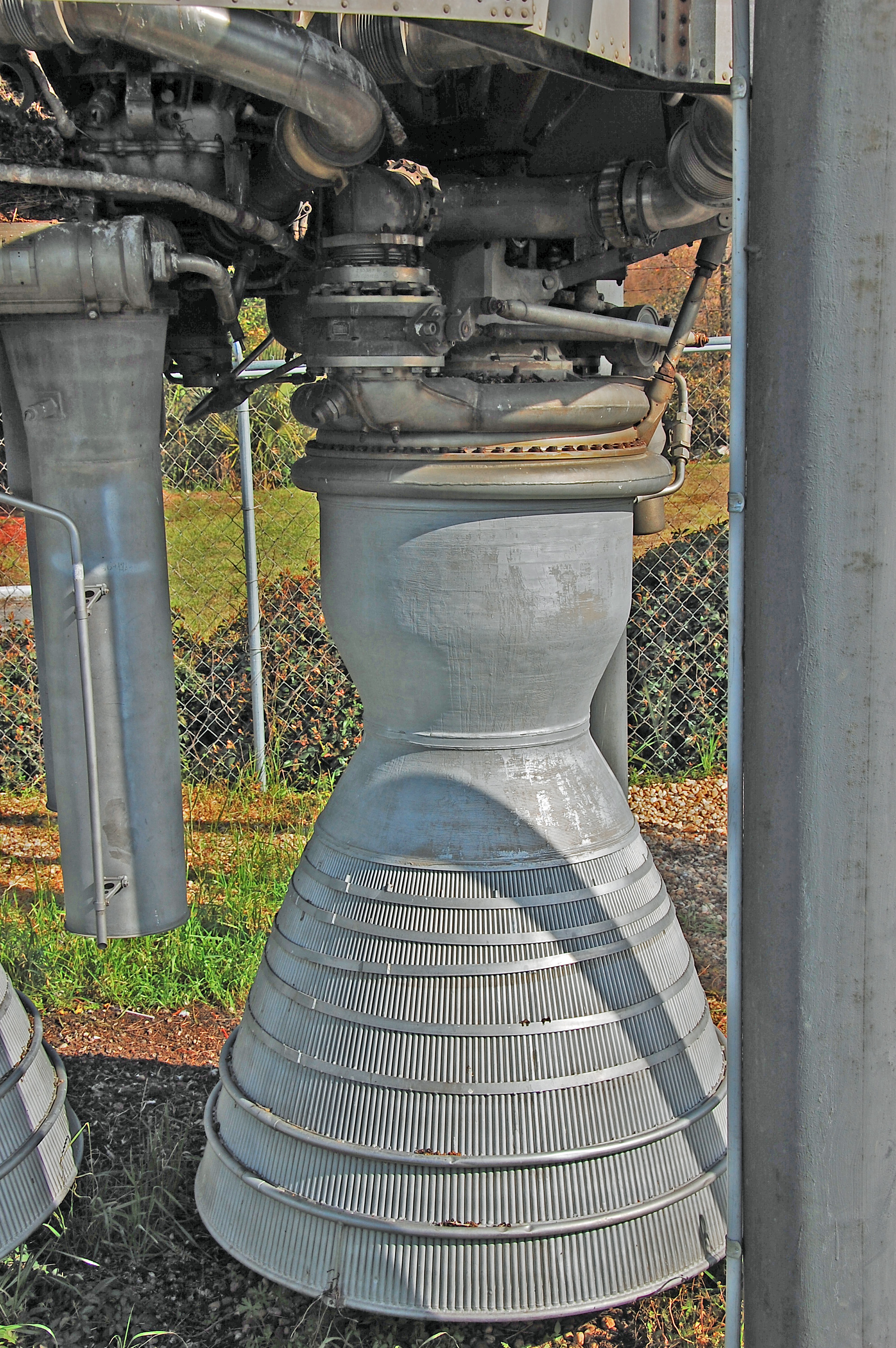
Titan I LR87-3 (Cordele, GA)

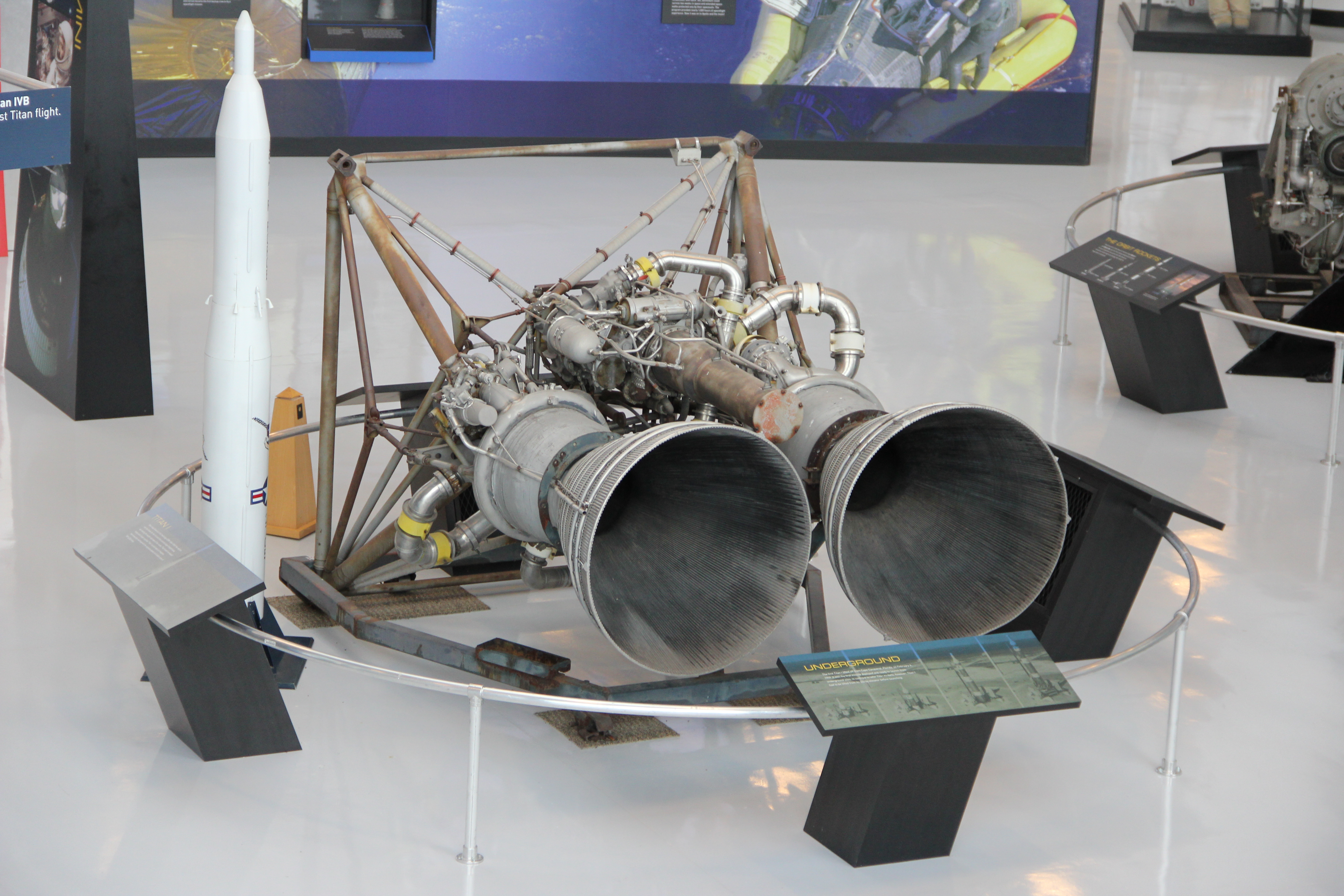
Titan I LR87-3 (Evergreen Aviation & Space Museum)

=== LR87-5 ===
Instead of liquid oxygen and RP-1, the Titan II used nitrogen tetroxide and Aerozine 50. This change was done for storability at the request of the US Air Force. The LR87-5 engine was generally lighter and simpler than its predecessor, partly due to the use of hypergolic propellants, which do not need an independent ignition system. The engines also had simpler controls, solid-propellant cartridges to start the turbopumps, simplified injectors, and autogenous pressurization, replacing the heavy tanks of cold helium gas. Instead, the fuel tank was pressurized with fuel-rich gas-generator exhaust, and the oxidizer tank with NTO evaporated in a heat exchanger using turbine exhaust.

Beginning in 1984, Titan II missiles were decommissioned and became available as launch vehicles. Their engines were modified for this use.

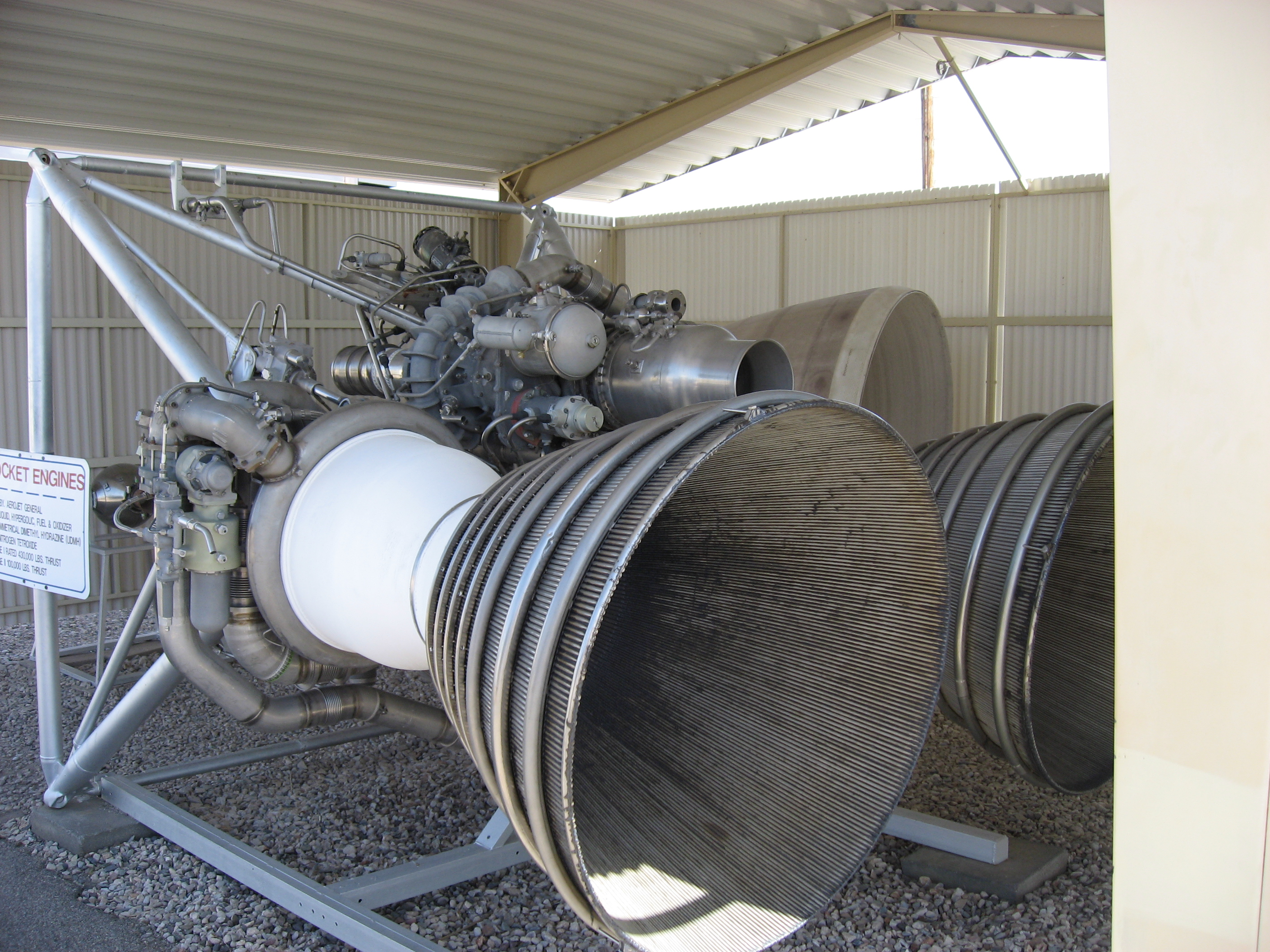
Titan II LR87-5 (Titan Missile Museum)

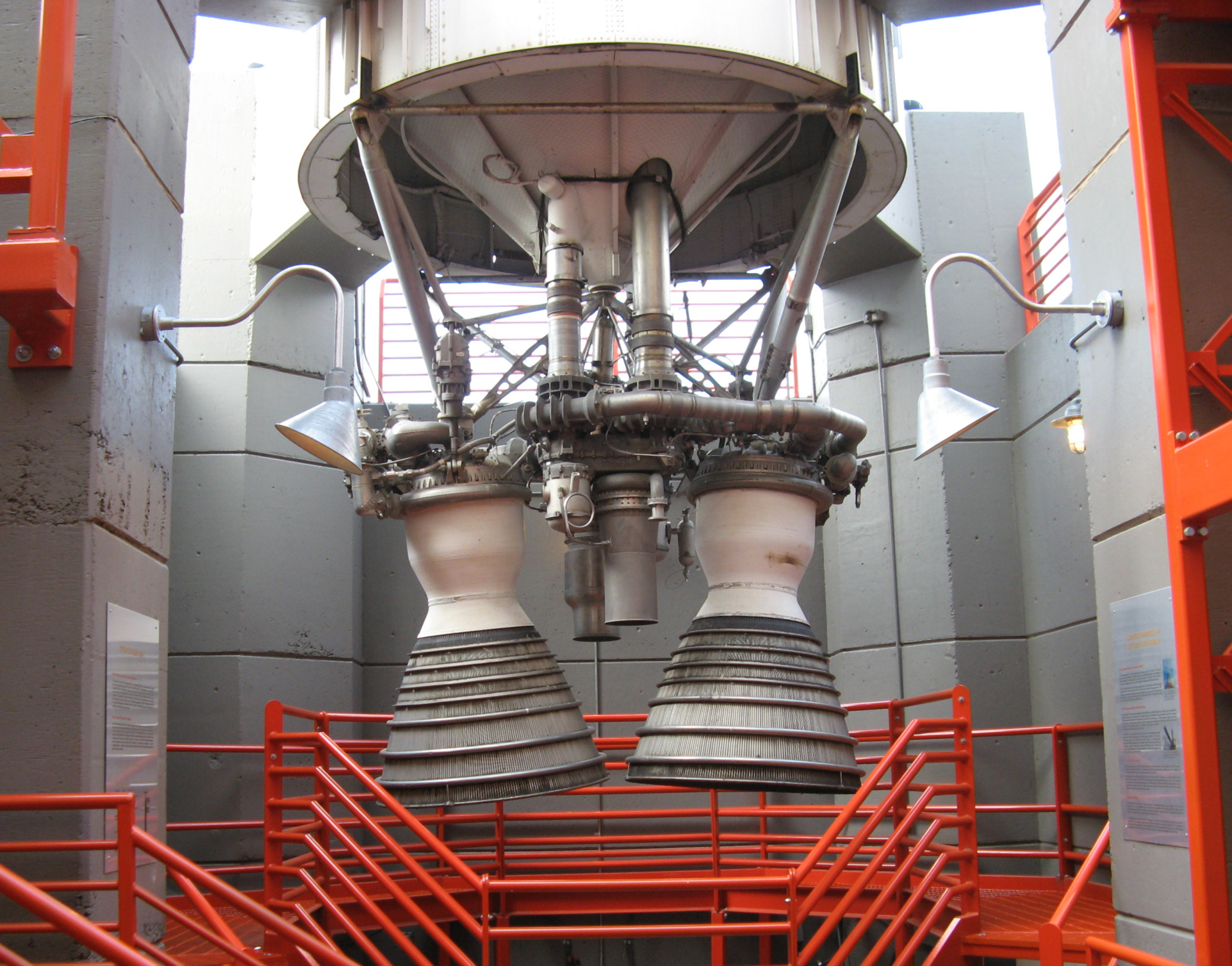
Titan II LR87-5 (Kansas Cosmosphere and Space Center)

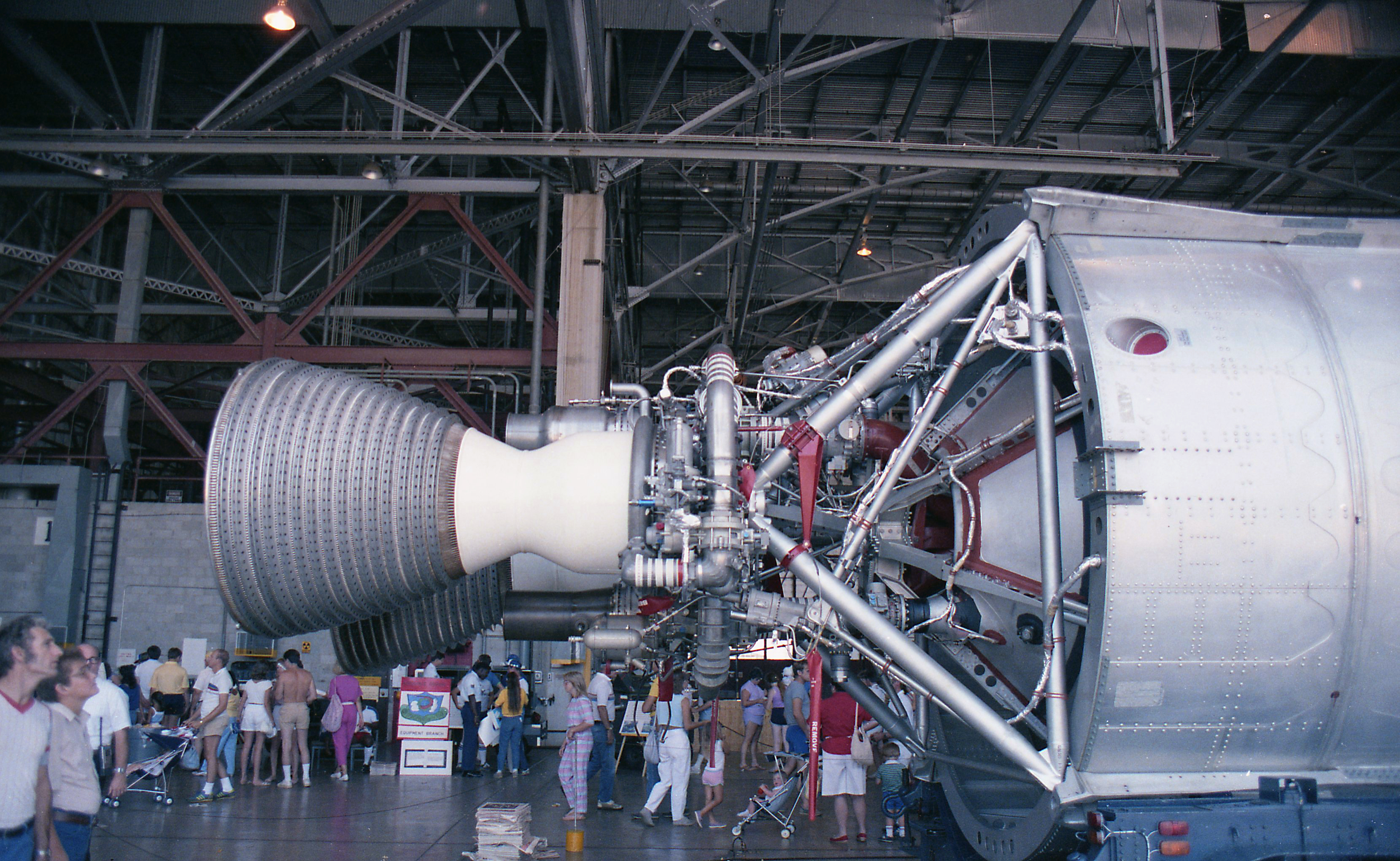
Titan II LR87-5 (LRAFB)

=== LR87-7 ===
The LR87-5 was adapted to the needs of the Gemini program. The LR87-7 had added redundancies and safety features for human-rating certification. The performance was similar to the previous version, only reducing the chamber pressure and nozzle thrust to meet human-rating requirements. This version was only used on the Titan II GLV.

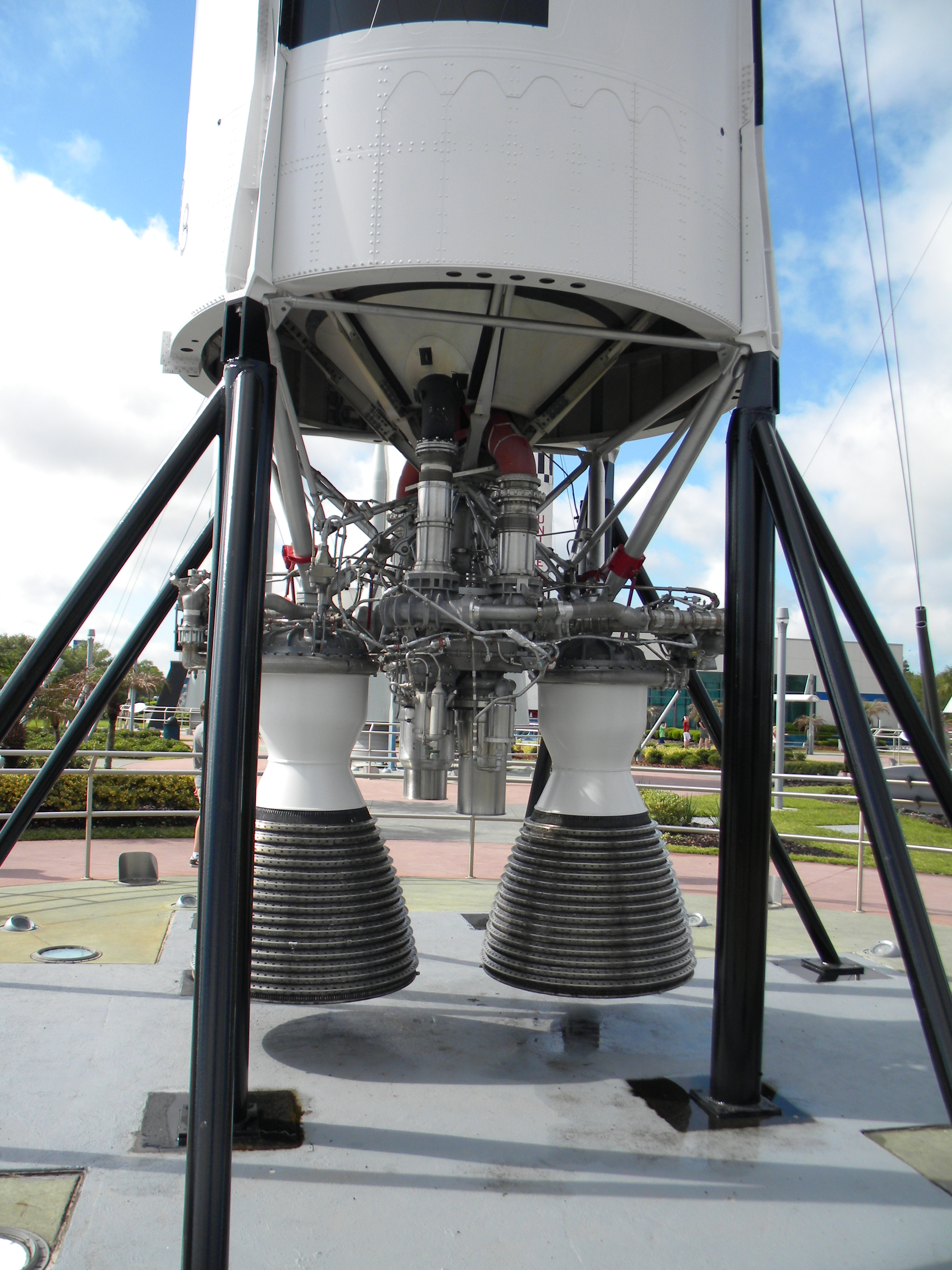
Titan II GLV LR87-7 (Kennedy Space Center)

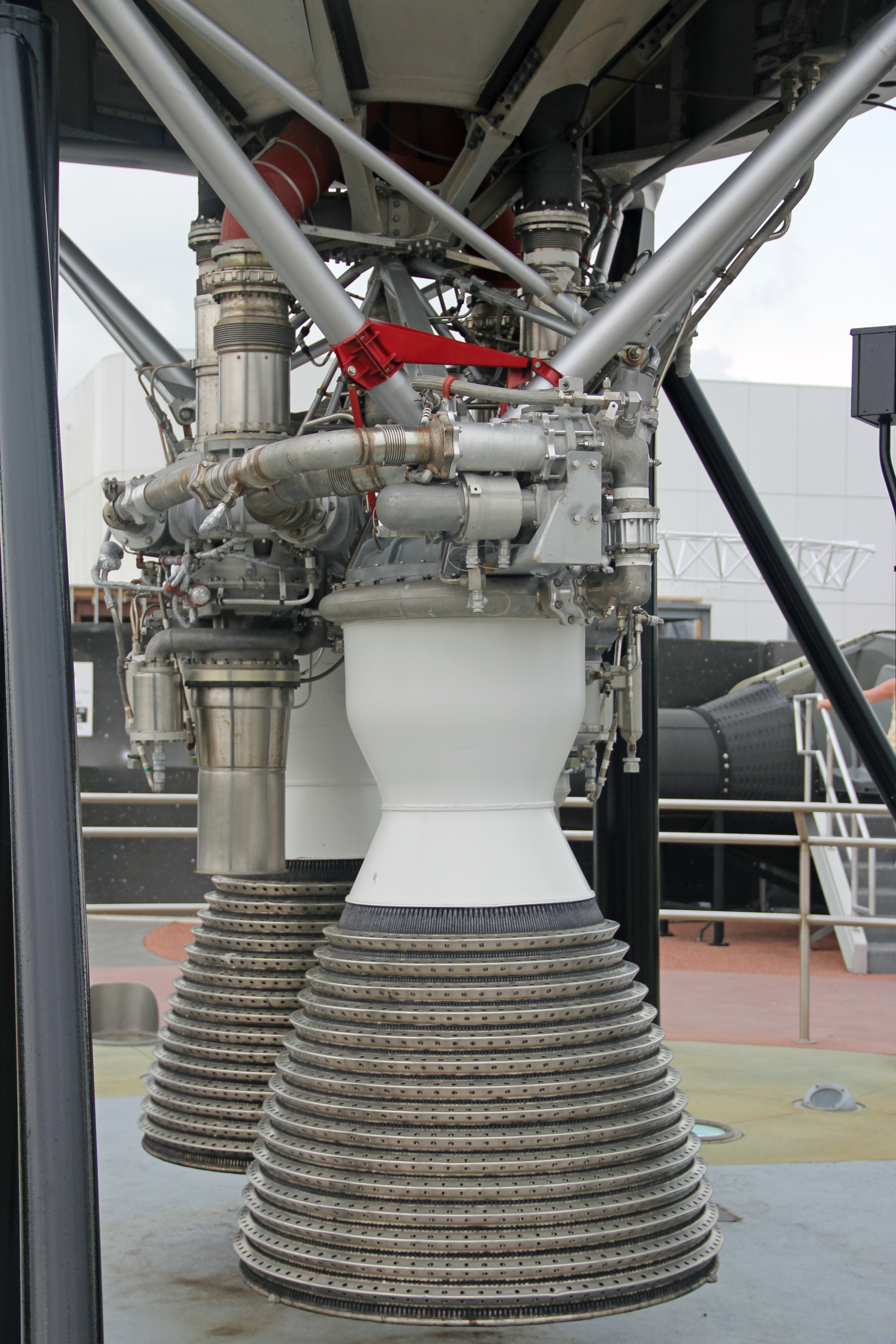
Titan II GLV LR87-7 (Kennedy Space Center)

=== LR87-9 ===
The LR87-9 was first flown in 1966 and used on the Titan IIIA, IIIB, and IIIC.

=== LR87-11/11A ===
The LR87-11 was first flown in 1968 and used on Titan 24B, 34B, IIIBS, IIID, 34D, 34D7, IIIE. It had a higher thrust than previous versions. The LR87-11A was used on the Titan IV A/B.

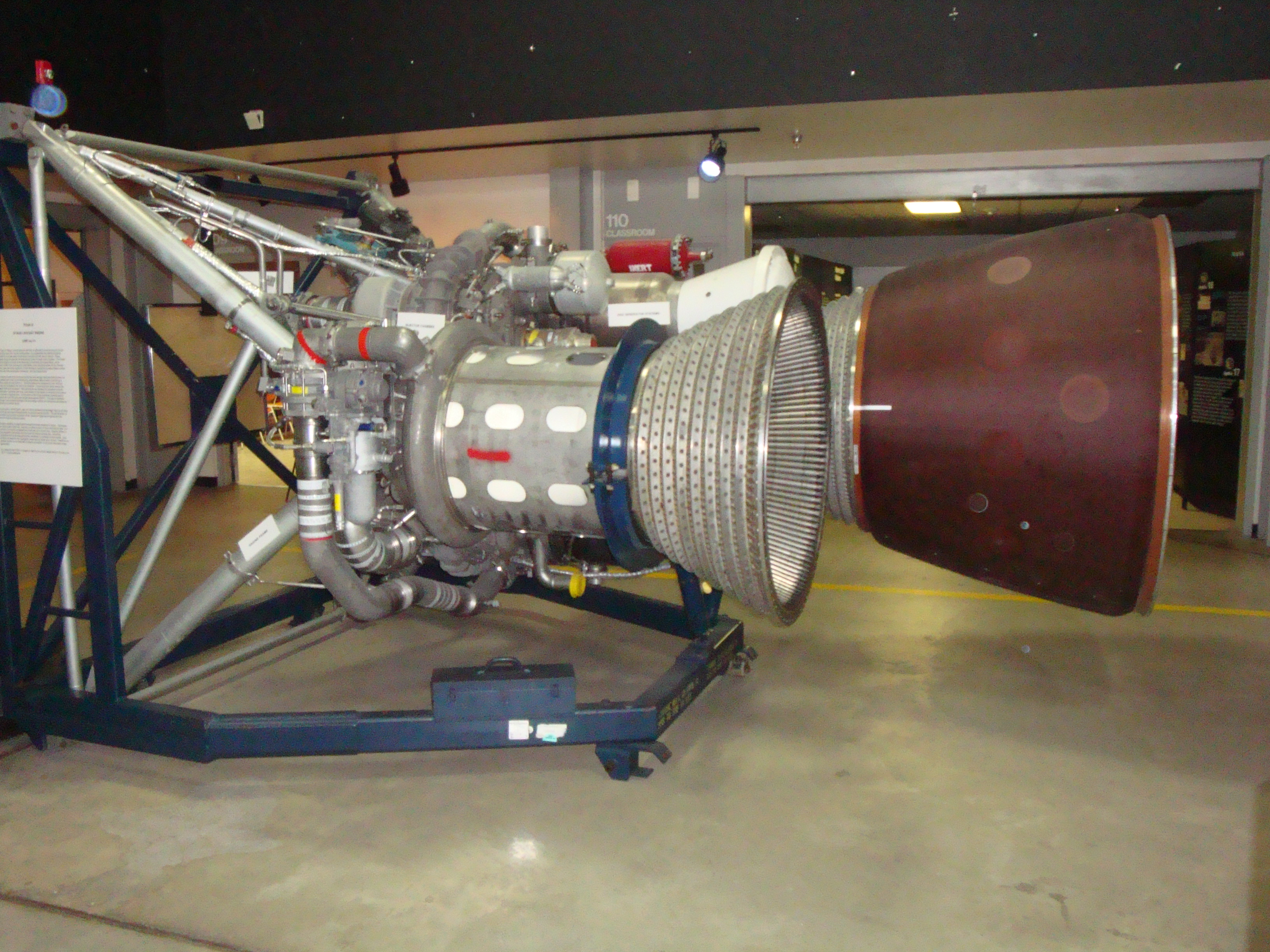
LR-87-11A (Wings Over the Rockies Air and Space Museum)

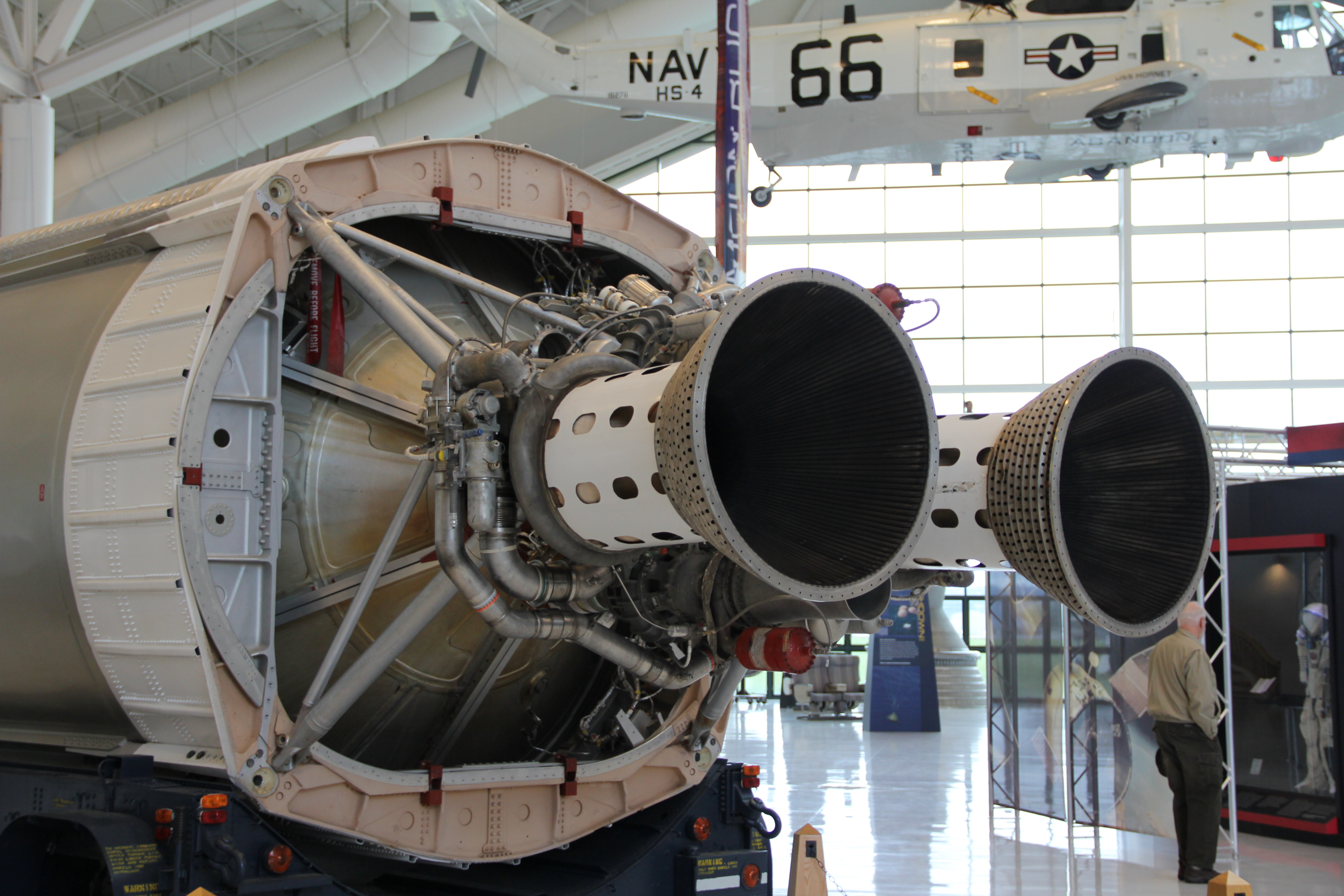
LR-87-11A (Evergreen Aviation & Space Museum)

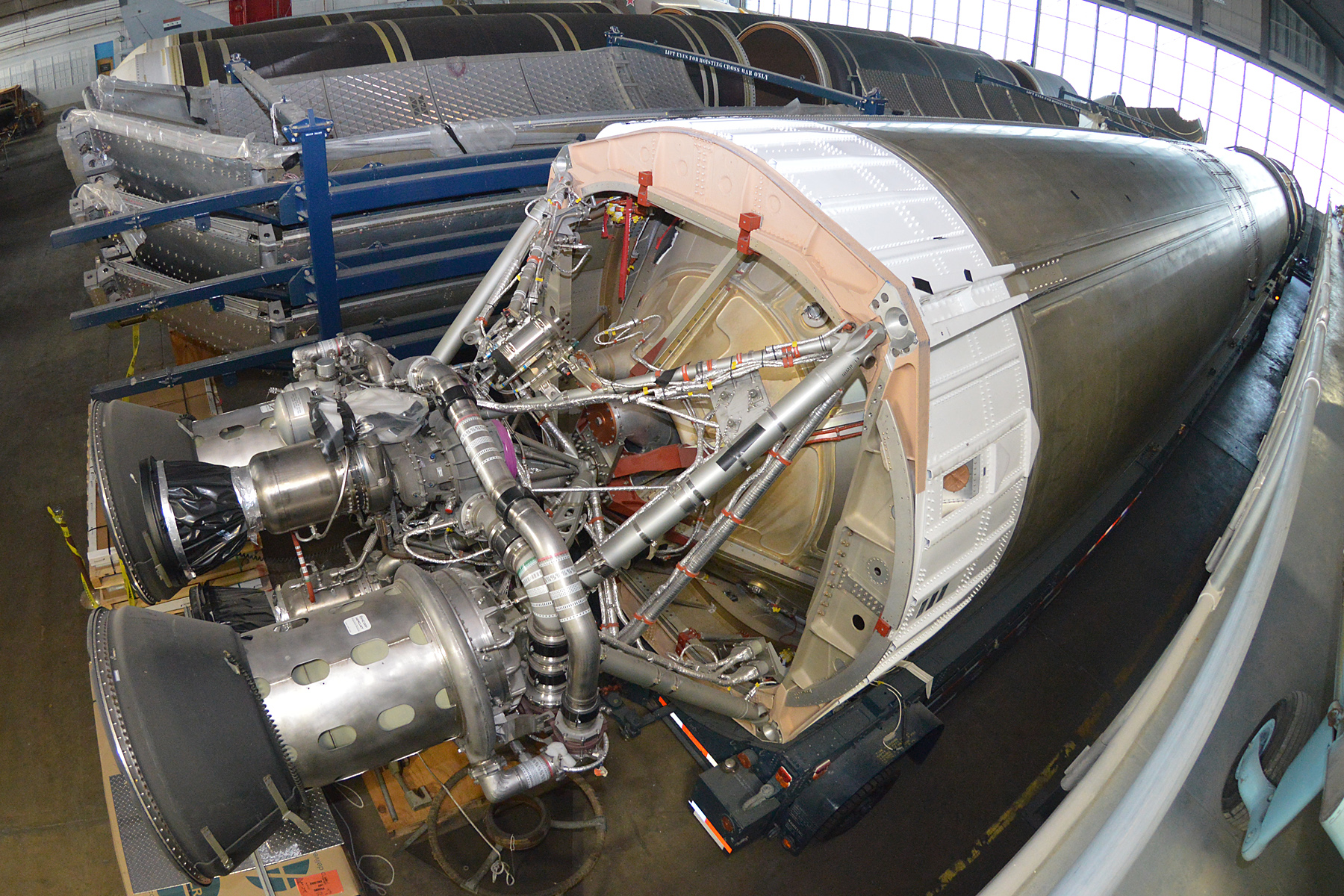
LR-87-11A (National Museum of the United States Air Force)

=== LR87 LH2 ===
The LR87 LH" was an engine modified to burn liquid oxygen and liquid hydrogen. The development coincided with other variants of the late 1950s. Compared to the -3, it had a number of changes associated with the use of lighter and colder liquid hydrogen. The fuel injectors were greatly modified, and the RP-1 pump was replaced with a purpose-designed single-stage hydrogen pump. Developed 1958–1961, a total of 52 static tests were performed without serious issue. Aerojet took part in the selection process for a new engine for the second stage of the Saturn IB and Saturn V. Though LR87 LH2 was the best in 10 out of 11 criteria, NASA selected Rocketdyne's J-2. Lessons learned were used during development of the Aerojet M-1. It was only built with 1 chamber.

=== LR87 / Alumazine ===
The LR87 was also tested with a gelled Dinitrogen Tetroxide / Alumizine fuel. Though the earlier tests with the LR87 were terminated due to combustion instabilities and funding restraints development of gelled fuel and oxidizers continued to produce fuels for engines currently used in space.

== Engine comparison ==
Engine	LR87-3	LR87-5	LR87-7	LR87-9	LR87-11	LR87 LH2
Aerojet Model	AJ23-130	AJ23-132	AJ23-134	AJ23-136	AJ23-139	
Fuel	LOX/Kerosene	N2O4/Aerozine 50	N2O4/Aerozine 50	N2O4/Aerozine 50	N2O4/Aerozine 50	LOX/LH2
First flight	1959	1962 (Note: ICBM; orbital Titan II launch 1968.)	1962	1966	1968	–
Number built	140		212		534	
Thrust, (Note: Per thrust chamber; two are mounted together on each Titan.) V (Note: In vacuum)	733.9 kN	1096.8 kN	1086.1 kN		1218.8 kN	667 kN
I_{SP}, V	290s	297s	296s		302s	
Thrust, SL (Note: At sea level)	647.9 kN	956.5 kN	946.7 kN	956.1 kN	968.4 kN	578 kN
I_{SP}, SL	256s	259s	258s		250s	350 s
Burn time	138s	155s	139s		200s	
Height	3.13m	3.13m	3.13m		3.13m (Note: Height at top of turbopump assembly; 3.84m to top of thrust structure.)	4 m
Diameter	1.53m	1.14m	1.53m		1.14m	1.14 m
Mass	839 kg	739 kg	713 kg		758 kg	700 kg
Chamber pressure	40.00 bar	53.3 atm (54.01 bar)	47.00 bar		58.3 atm (59.07 bar)	
Area ratio	8	8	9		15	8
TWR, V	89.2	151.34	155.33		163.96	97.14
Oxidizer/fuel ratio	1.91	1.93	1.9		1.91	
Coefficient of Thrust, V	1.8453		2.23		3.03	
Coefficient of thrust, SL	1.6453		1.98		2.78	
Propellant flow		750 kg/s			824.7 kg/s	
Source						

== See also ==
- AJ10
- RL10
- Titan (rocket)
- Rocket engine using liquid fuel
